= Art & History Museum =

Public museum in Brussels, Belgium

- Musée Art & Histoire (French); Museum Kunst & Geschiedenis (Dutch)
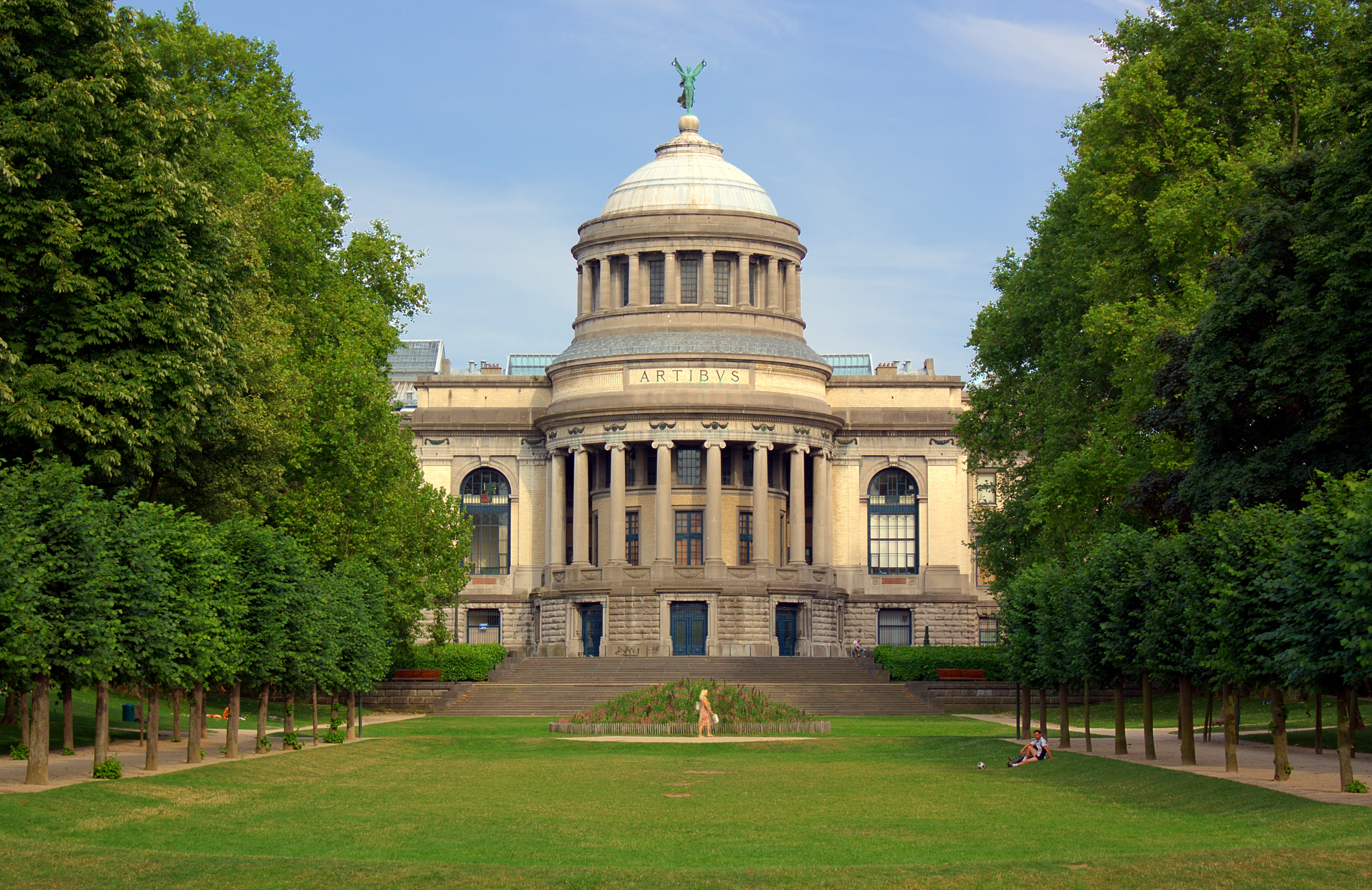
- The Art & History Museum, seen from the Parc du Cinquantenaire/Jubelpark
- Interactive fullscreen map
- Former name: Cinquantenaire Museum
- Location: Parc du Cinquantenaire / Jubelpark 10, 1000 City of Brussels, Brussels-Capital Region, Belgium
- Coordinates: 50°50′21″N 4°23′31″E
- Type: Art, ethnology, history
- Public transit access: Brussels-Schuman; 1 5 Schuman and Merode
- Parking: Museum grounds
- Website: www.artandhistory.museum

The Art & History Museum (French: Musée Art & Histoire; Dutch: Museum Kunst & Geschiedenis) is a public museum of antiquities and ethnographic and decorative arts located at the Parc du Cinquantenaire/Jubelpark in Brussels, Belgium. The museum is one of the constituent parts of the Royal Museums of Art and History (RMAH) and is one of the largest art museums in Europe. It was formerly called the Cinquantenaire Museum (French: Musée du Cinquantenaire; Dutch: Jubelpark Museum) until 2018.

== History ==
The museum's first collections were assembled during the reigns of the Dukes of Burgundy and subsequently the Habsburg archdukes, and were placed in various locations in Brussels, their capital. In 1847, the newly formed Kingdom of Belgium acquired the artworks, which were placed in the Halle Gate in what was known as the Musée royal d'Armures, d'Antiquités et d'Ethnologie ("Royal Museum of Armour, Antiquities and Ethnology").

By 1889, when the space became too small, the collections were relocated to the Parc du Cinquantenaire/Jubelpark (except for the armour and weapons, which remained in the old location). The Cinquantenaire was an army parade ground until the 1880 National Exhibition, when the large iron, glass and steel Cinquantenaire Palace was built with a military museum in the north wing.

During the interwar period, the collections grew considerably due to Belgian scientific expeditions around the world, most notably to Apamea (Syria), to Egypt by the Egyptologist Jean Capart, and to Easter Island in 1936, or by excavations in archaeological sites across Belgium. Many wealthy Belgians also donated artworks to the museum. In the mid-20th century, a new wing was built in the west of the building to house the classical antiquity collections.

The museum was called the Cinquantenaire Museum (French: Musée du Cinquantenaire, Dutch: Jubelpark Museum) until 2018, when it was renamed the Art & History Museum (French: Musée Art & Histoire, Dutch: Museum Kunst & Geschiedenis).

== Collection ==
The Art & History Museum's collections are divided into four parts:

- National archaeology
- Classical antiquity
- Non-European civilisations
- European decorative arts

=== National archaeology ===
The museum has a large collection of national archaeological artefacts dating from prehistoric times, the Gallo-Roman period, to the Merovingian period (c. 751 AD).

==== Prehistory ====
The Prehistory room presents the vestiges of cultures and civilisations in what is now Belgium from the Paleolithic to the Iron Age. Tools, vases and jewellery are placed in context via models and reconstructions that depict daily life in ancient times.

==== Gallo-Roman Belgium ====
The conquest of Gaul by Caesar (c. 58–50 BC) marked the beginning of a new era for Belgium. The development of craftsmanship is confirmed by the richness and diversity of artefacts dating from that period: ceramic dishes, fibulae, bronze figurines, as well as glass, bronze and silver containers, the most refined examples of which come from rich funerary furniture. The reconstructions of a Roman villa façade, a heating system, and even a painted wall decor, embody the Gallo-Roman culture.

==== Merovingian civilisation ====
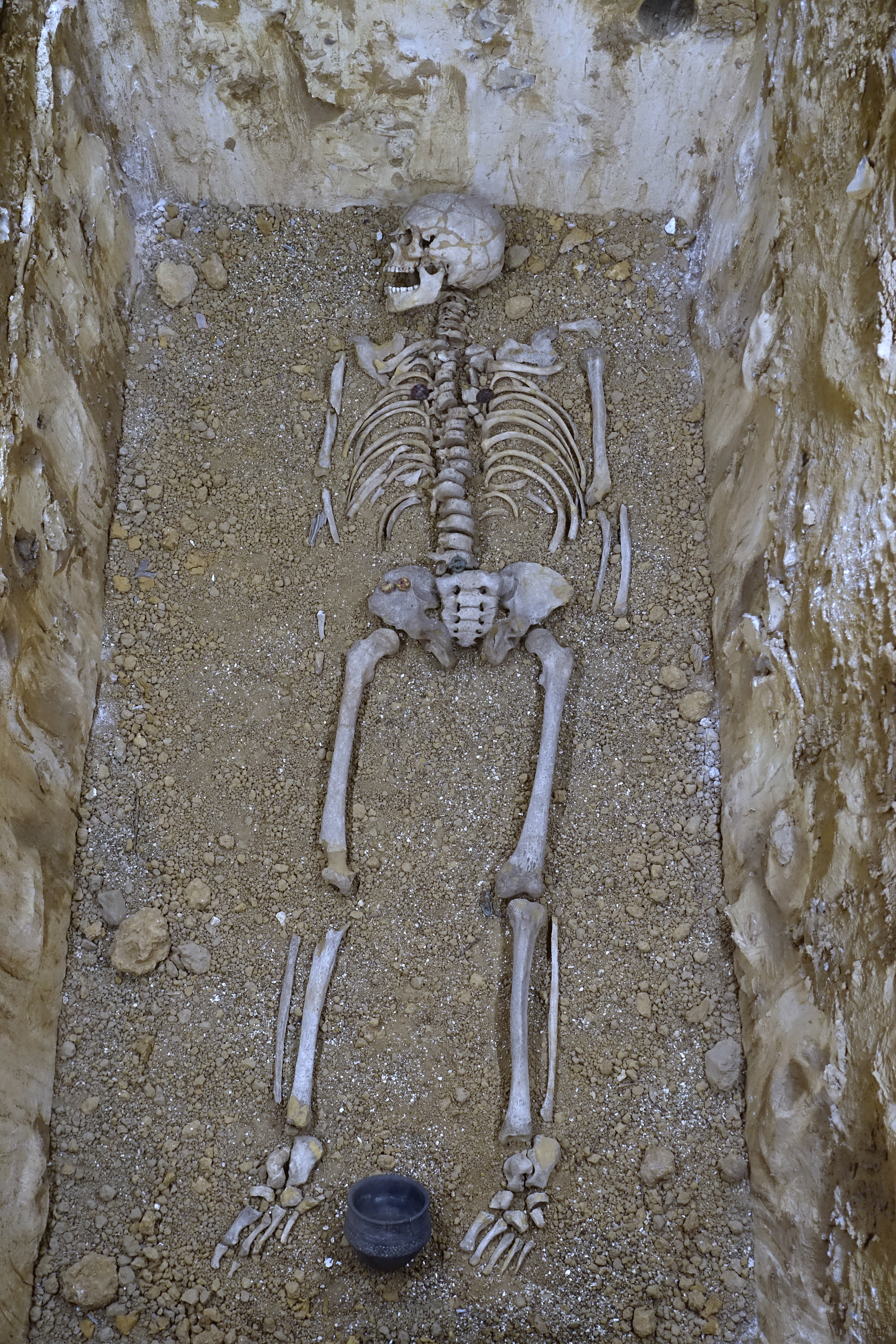
Merovingian tomb with funerary items, mid 6th century AD

The Merovingian civilisation is known to us mainly through the worship of the dead. In this context, eight tombs are reconstructed in the room presenting this period. Grave goods are arranged in themed display cases where visitors can view jewellery, belt buckles and other fibulae.

=== Classical antiquity ===
The museum's collection houses early art from the ancient Middle-Eastern, Egyptian, Greek and Roman civilisations.

==== Middle East ====
The Middle East, one of the cradles of civilisation, is presented through reliefs, jewellery and many earthen objects dating from prehistoric times to the dawn of the Islamic period (c. 610 AD). The cylinder-seals, personal seals and Luristan bronzes make up some of the highlights of the collection.

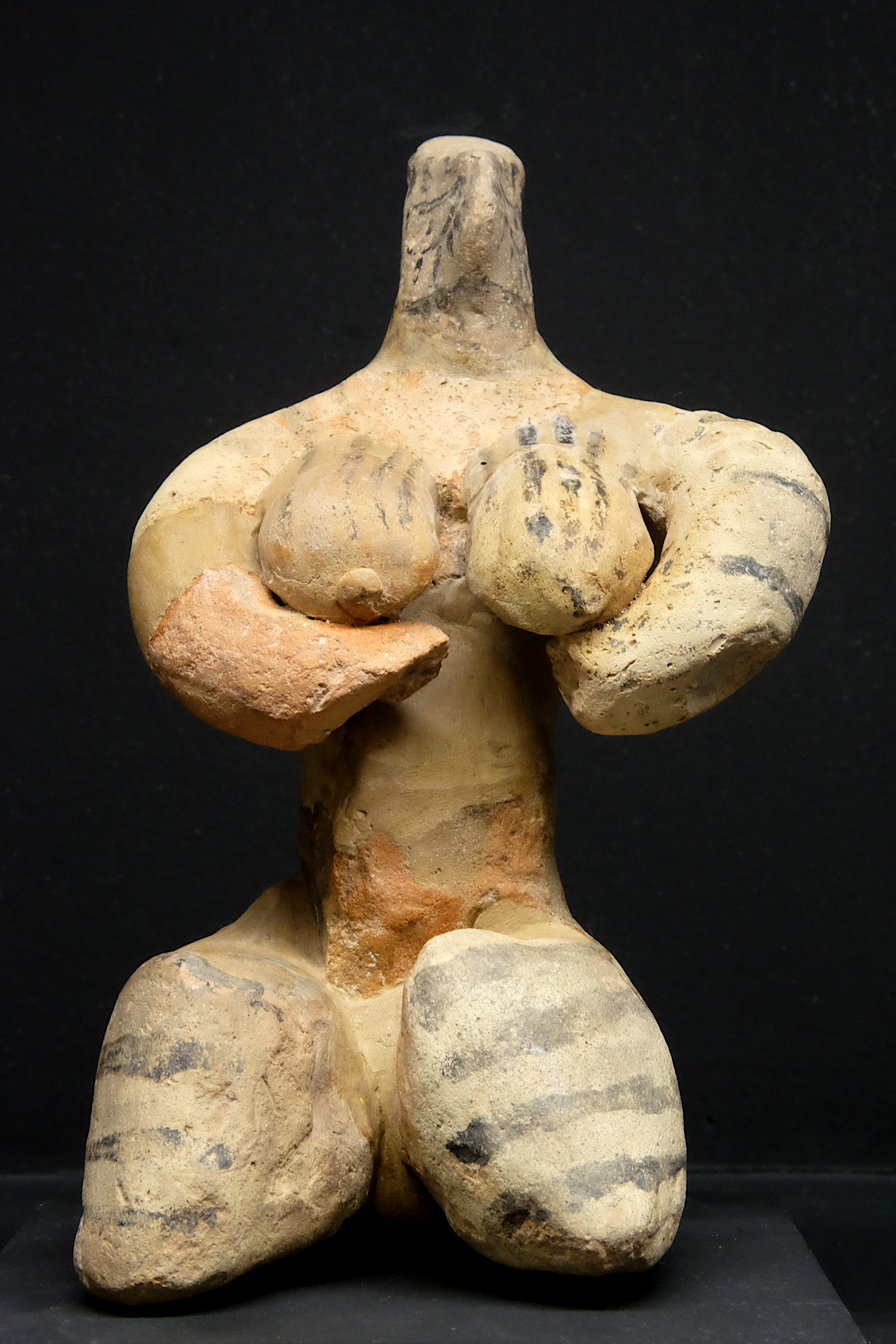
Female figurine, Halaf period, northern Syria, c. 5500 BC

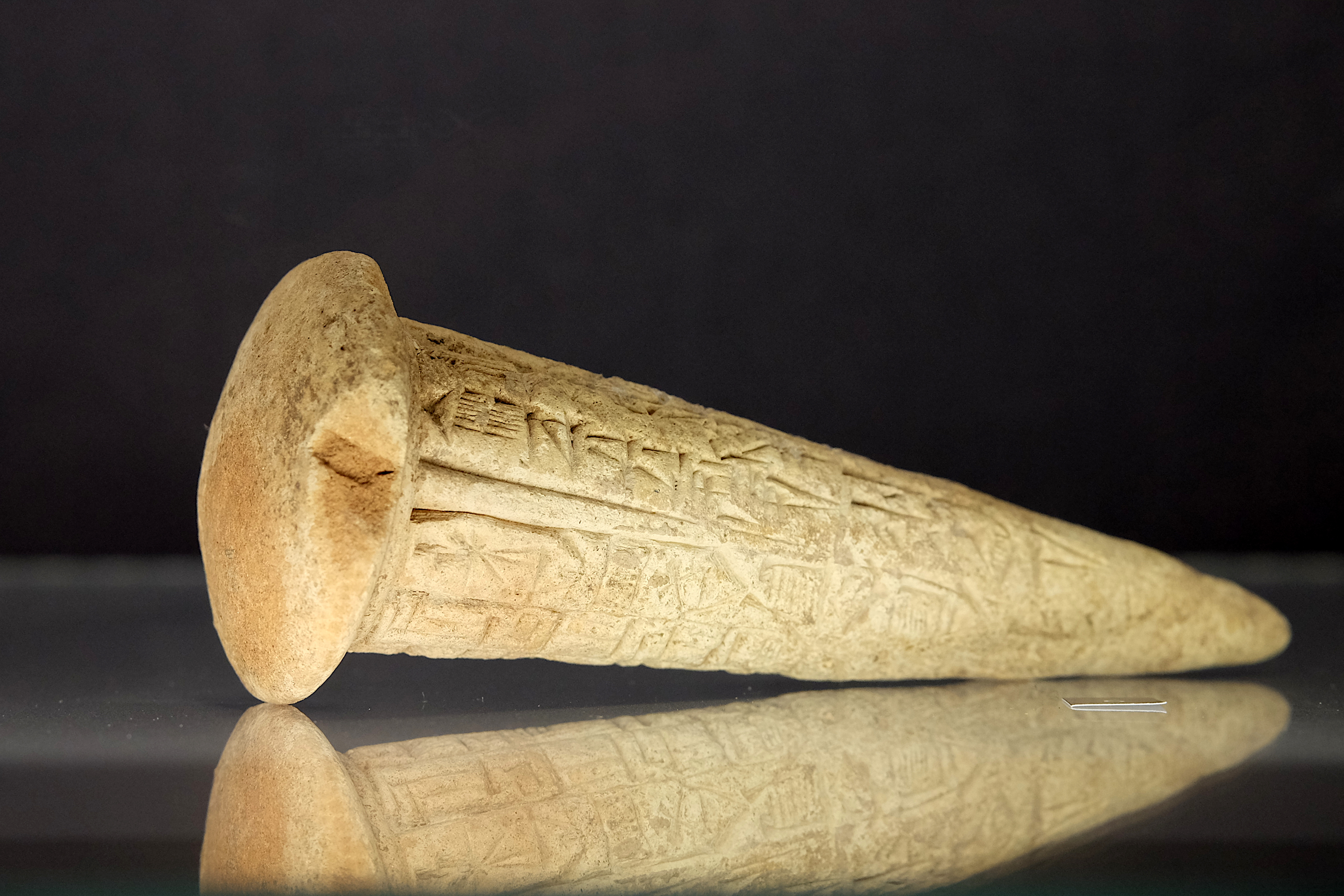
Foundation nail of the temple of Ningirsu, Girsu (Iraq), c. 2144–2124 BC

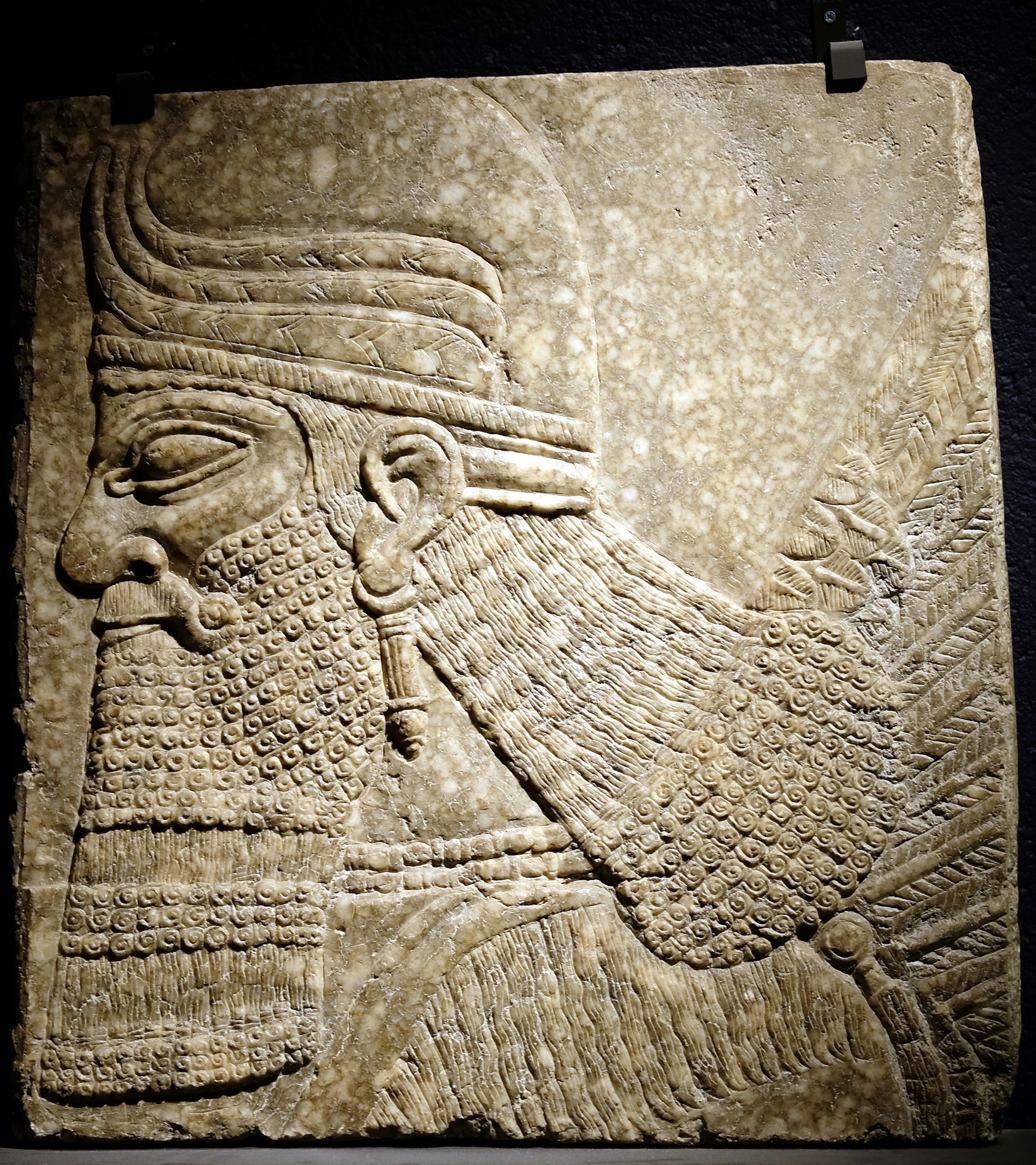
Winged genius head relief from the palace of Ashurnasirpal II, Nimrud (Iraq), c. 883–859 BC

==== Egypt ====
The Egyptian collection comprises more than 11,000 pieces, offering a wide view of Egyptian art, from its origins to the Christian era. The most striking works are the Lady of Brussels, the relief of Queen Tiyi (c. 1398–1338 BC), and the colossal head of a pharaoh from the Ptolemaic era (c. 323–30 BC). A mastaba, mummies and their sarcophagi illustrate the funeral customs of the ancient Egyptians.

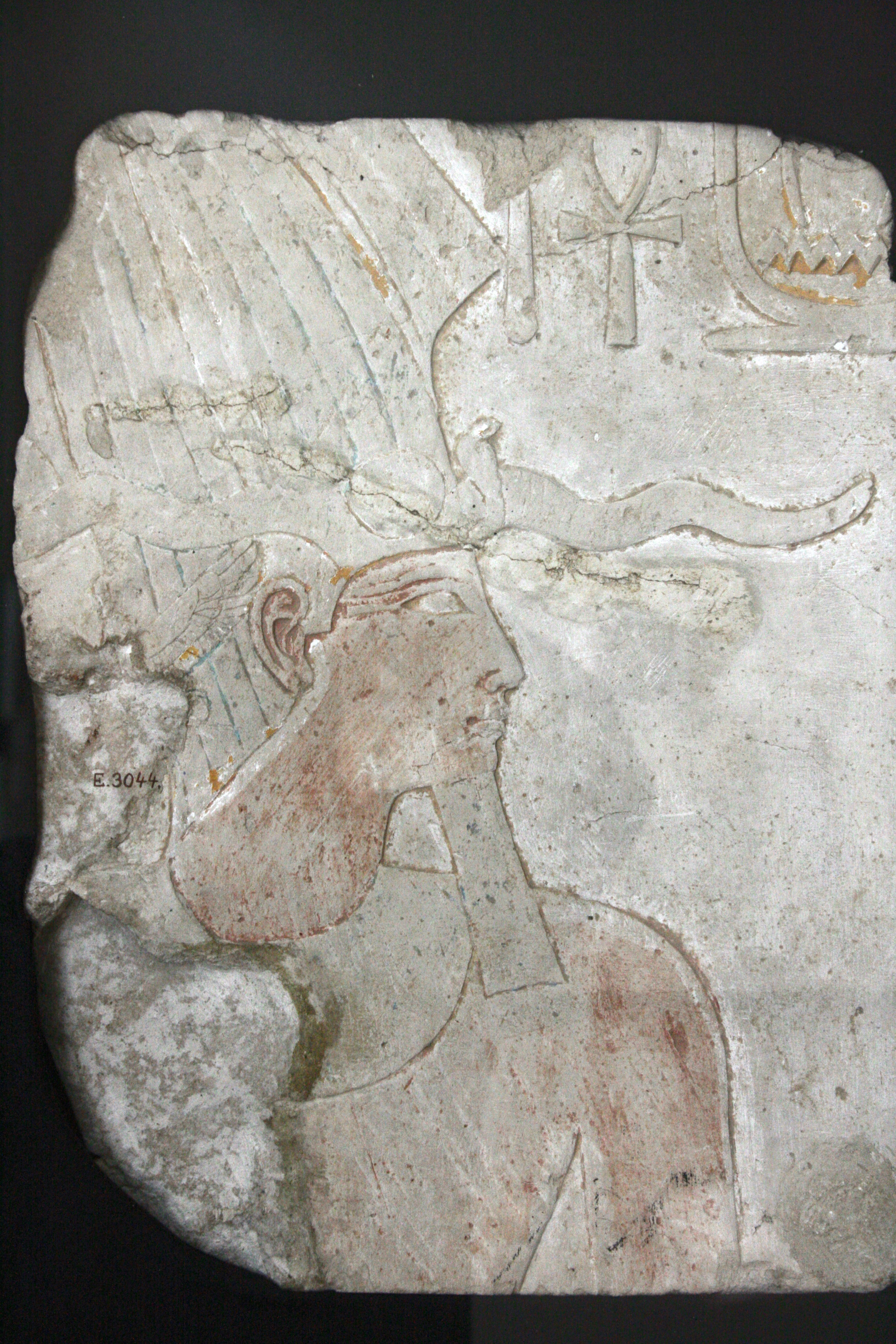
Queen Hatshepsut or Khnum, Egypt, c. 1480 BC

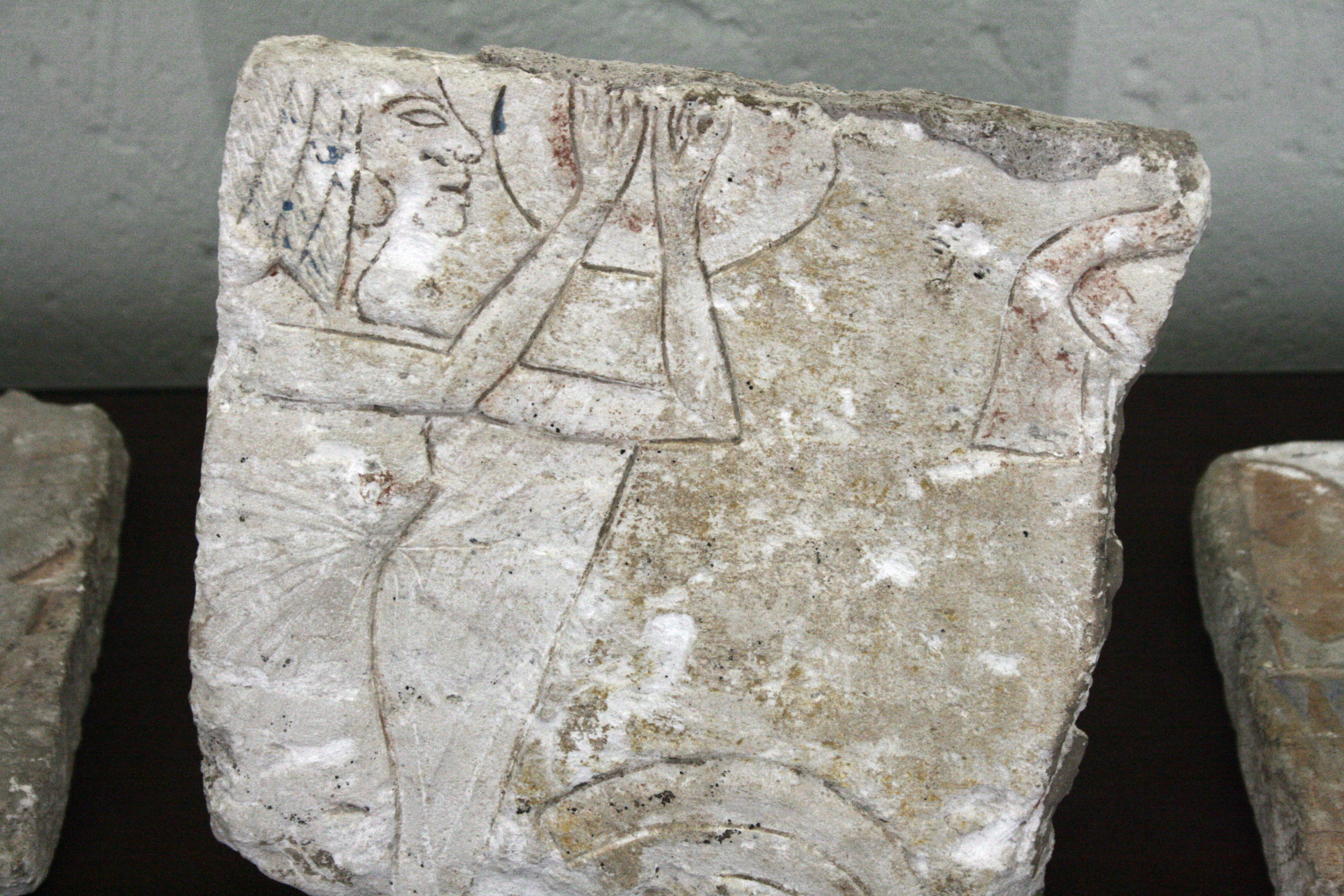
Akhenaten's daughter, Amarna period, Egypt, c. 1360 BC

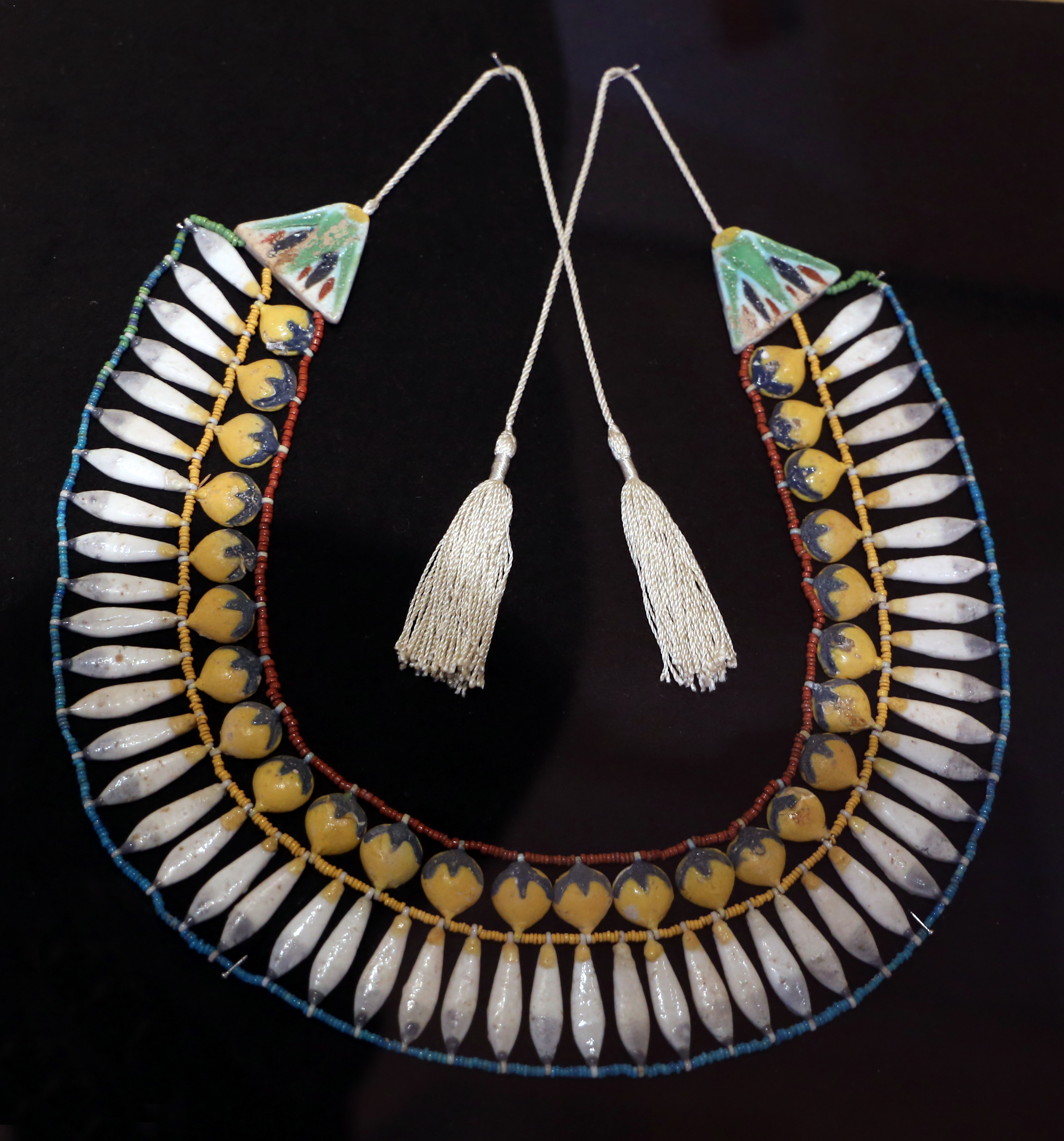
Glass and faience necklace, 18th dynasty, Egypt, c. 1325 BC

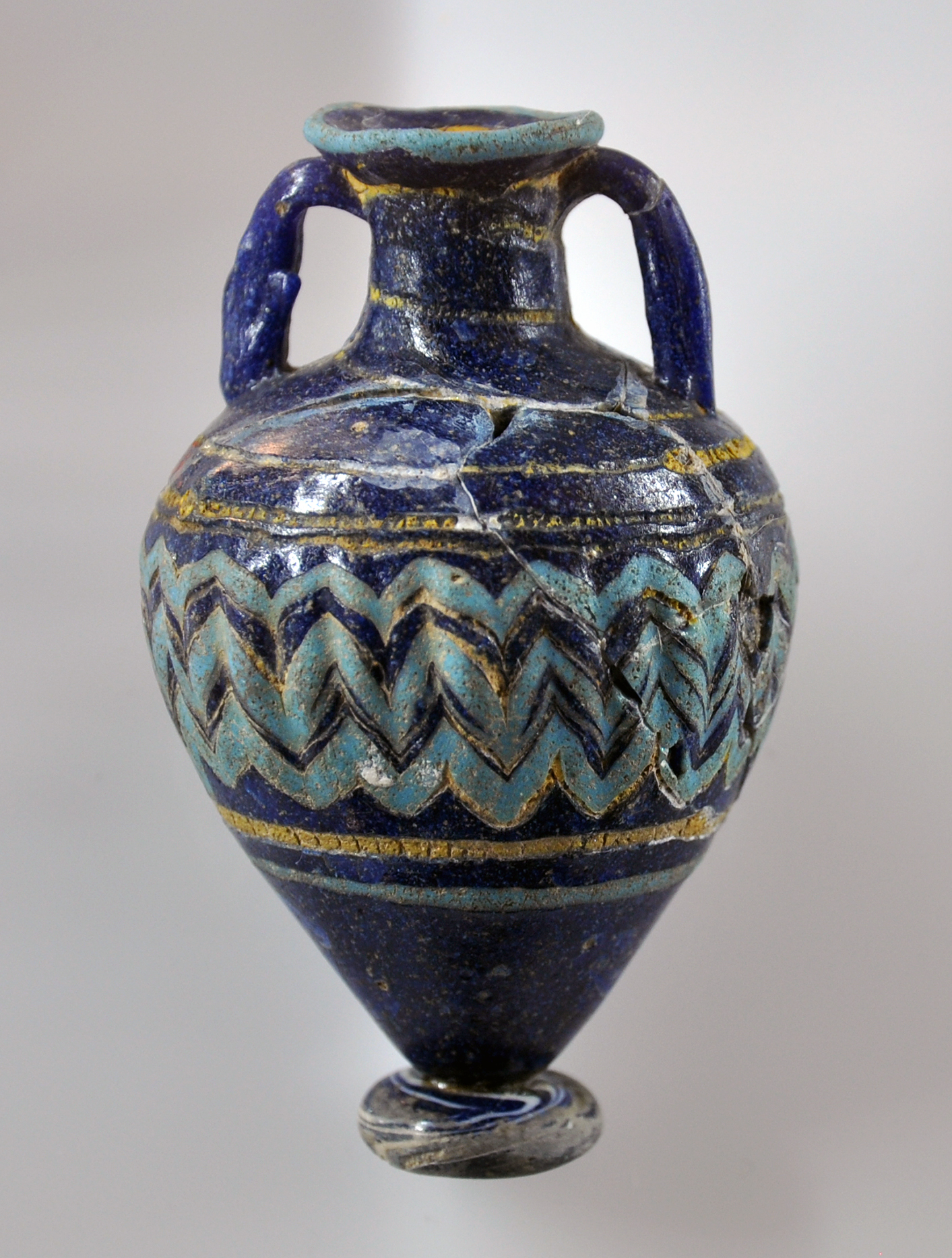
Glass vial, Egypt, c. 3rd–6th century AD

==== Greece ====
The collection of vases is the highlight of the Greek section. The forms, styles, decorations, and workshops are presented in all their diversity, from the Bronze Age to the Hellenistic period (c. 323–31 BC).

==== Rome ====
The Roman collections revolve around a few important works, namely Etruscan mirrors, as well as marble busts from the Imperial period. Many important and impressive remains from Apamea, Syria, including part of the Great Colonnade and outstanding mosaic floors are on view, such as a hunting scene from the palace of the governor of the province of Syria Secunda. A bronze statue of Emperor Septimius Severus is found in the Apamea hall. The Roman collection also includes a large-scale model of the city of Rome during the 4th century AD by the French architect Paul Bigot.

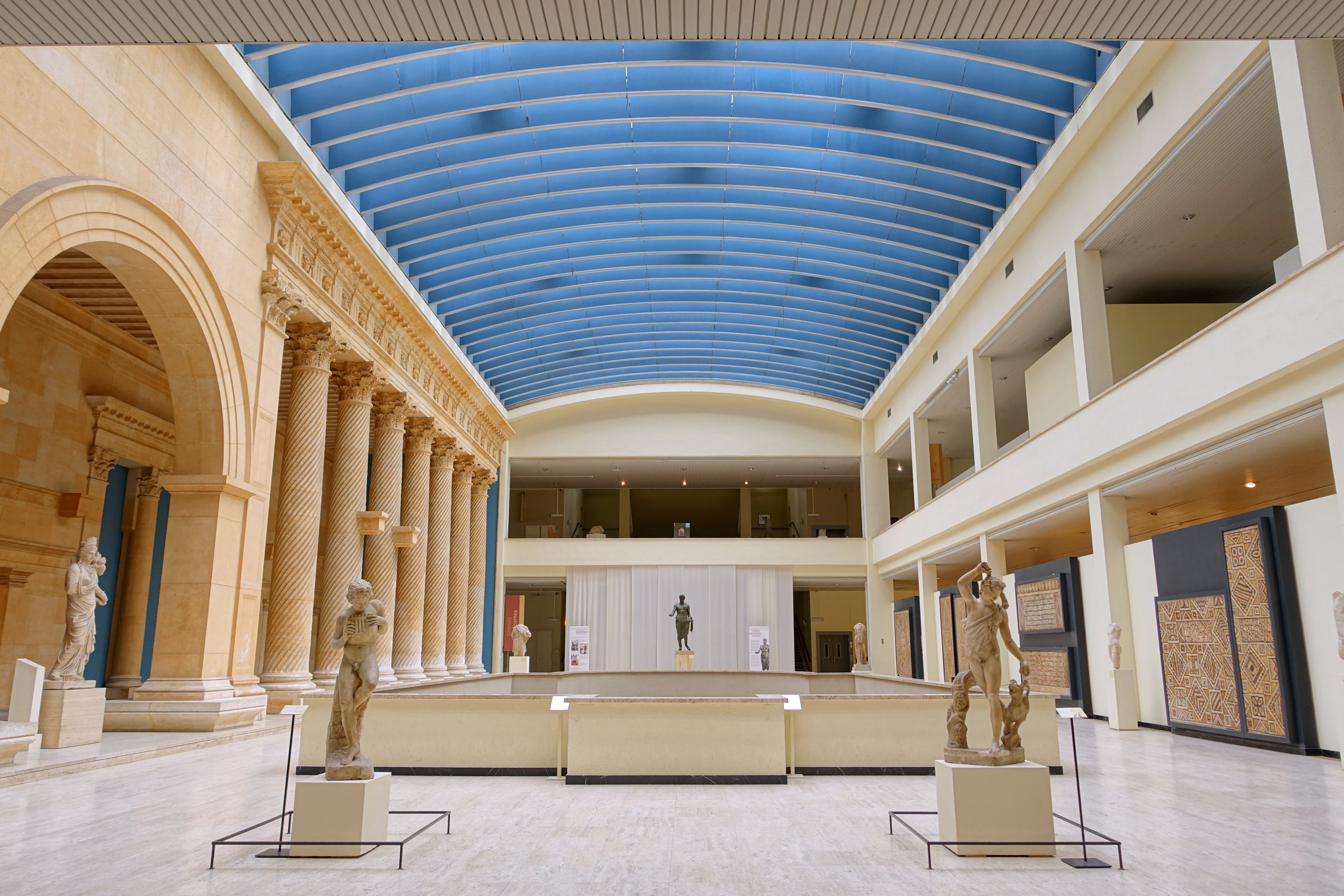
View of the classical antiquity collection

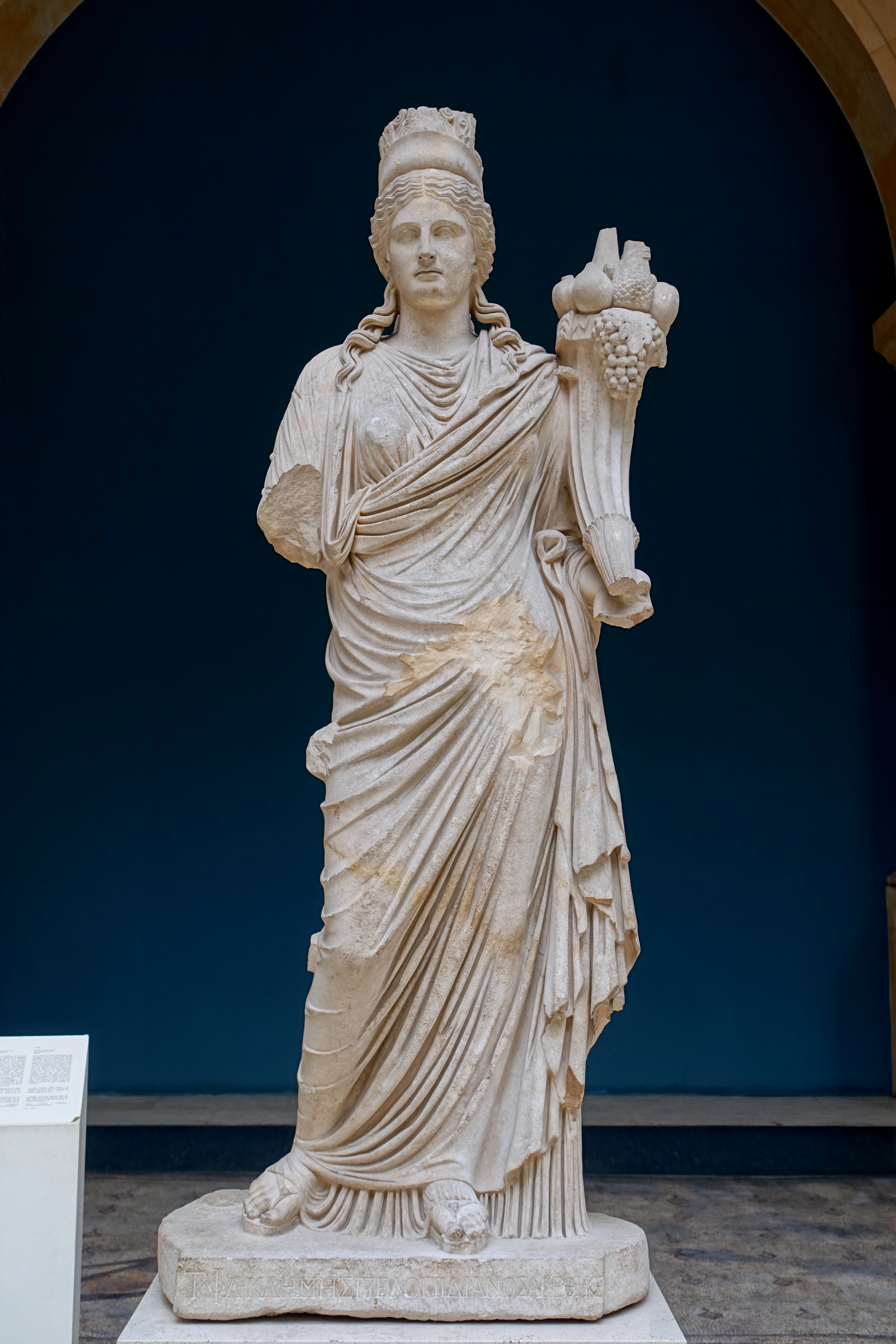
Marble sculpture of Tyche, first half of the 2nd century AD, unknown provenance

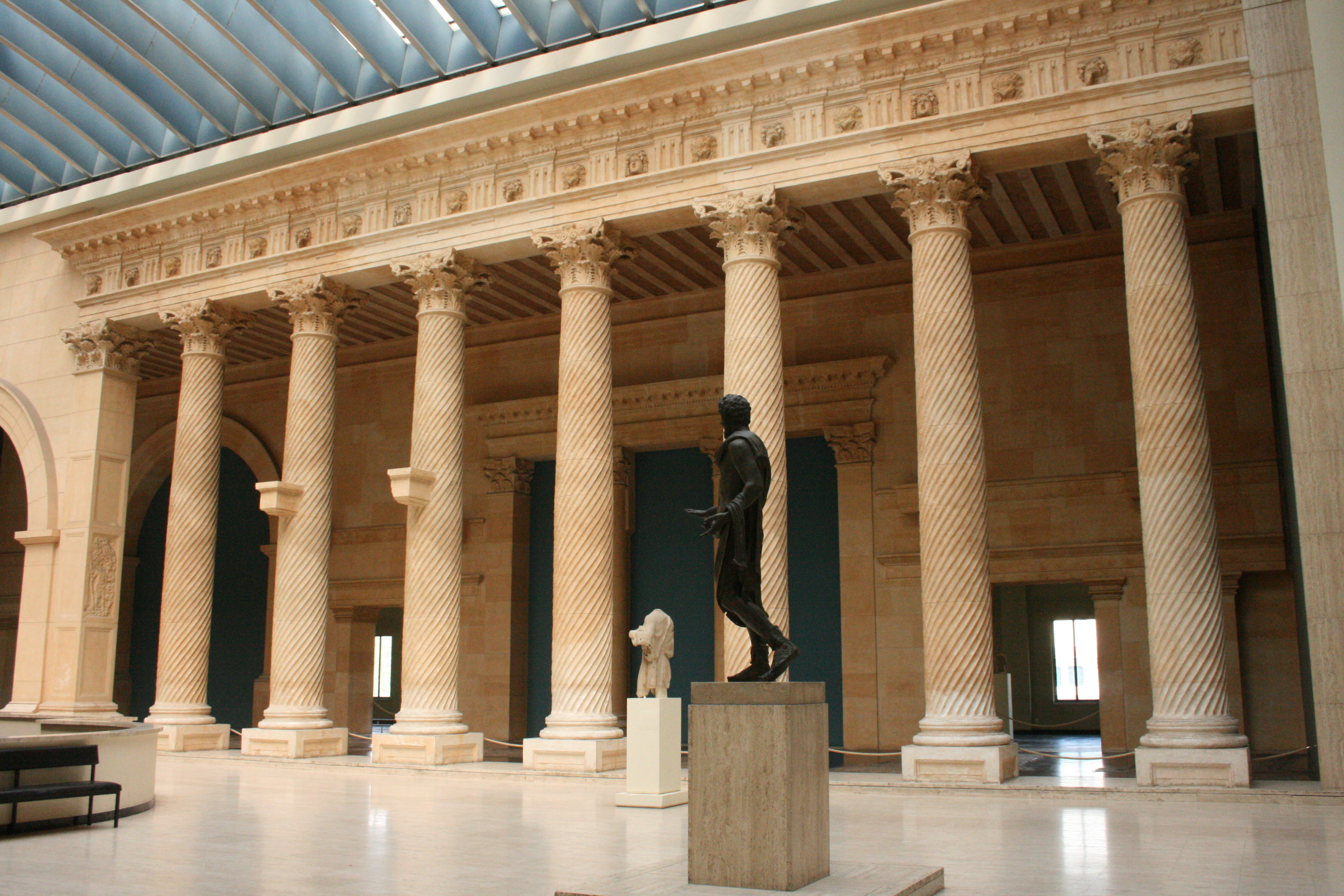
Great Colonnade from Apamea (Syria) with statue of Septimius Severus in front

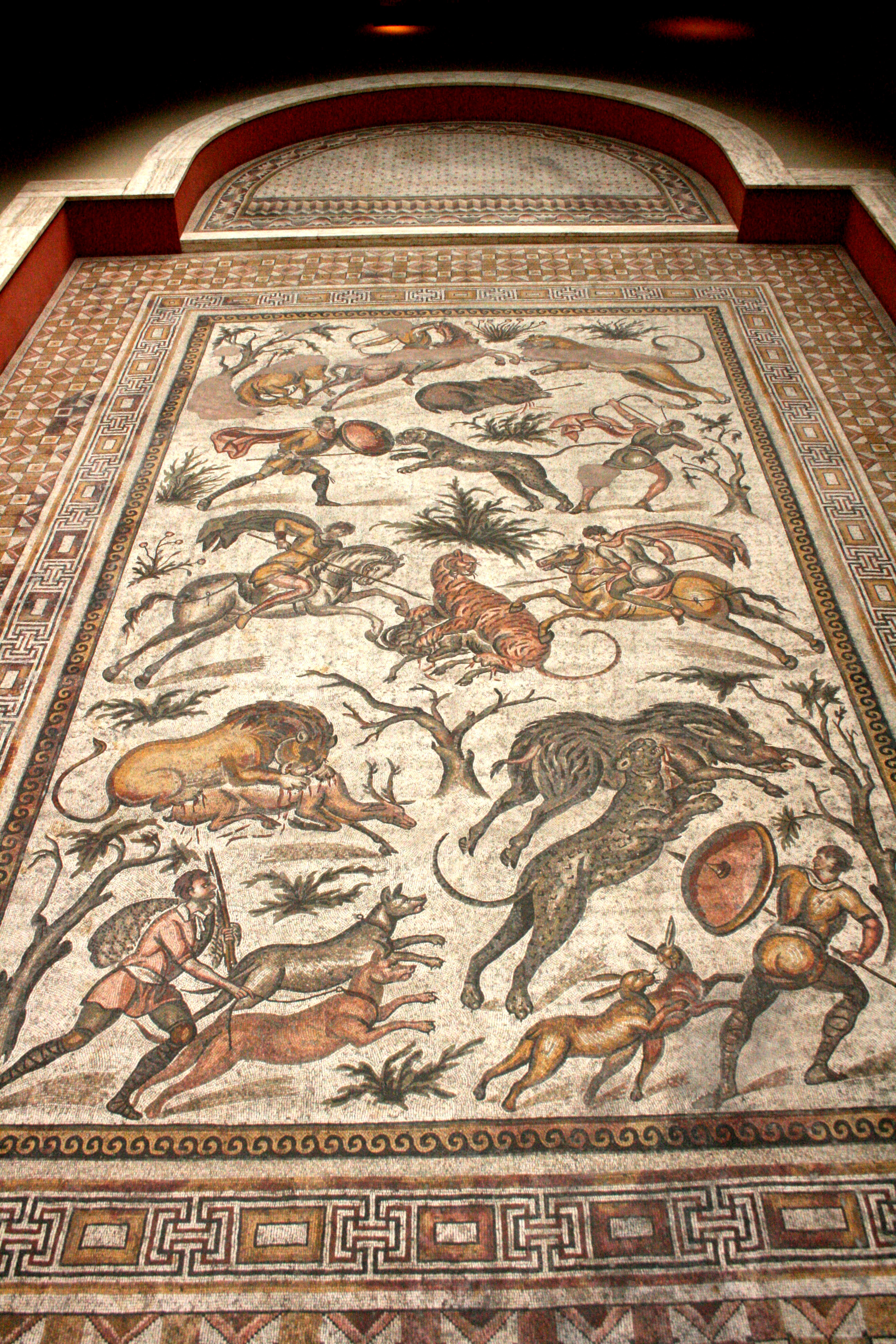
Roman mosaic from Apamea depicting a hunting scene, 5th century AD

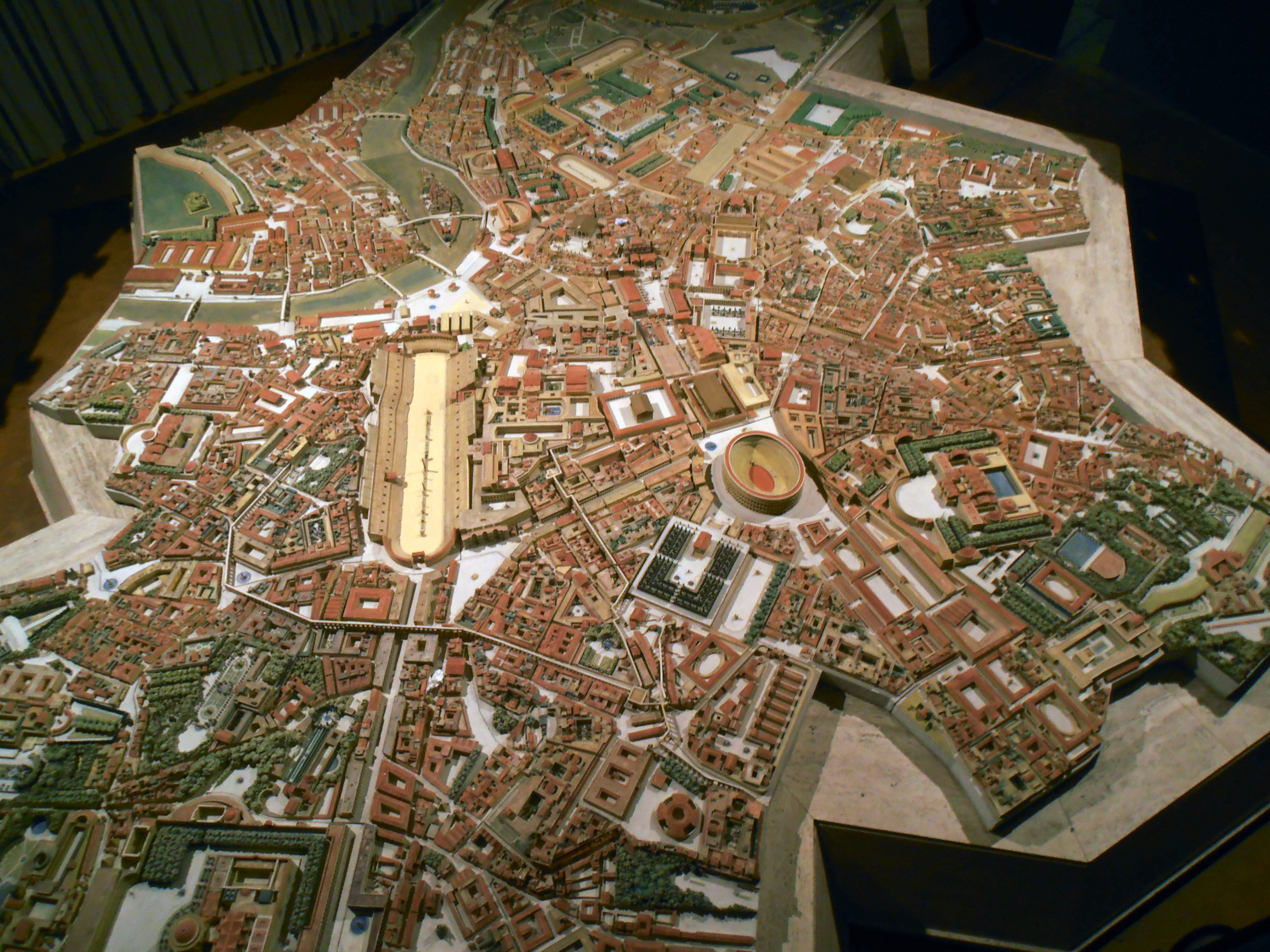
Model of Rome by Paul Bigot, 20th century

==== Byzantine and Oriental Christian arts ====
The Byzantine and Christian arts of the East are represented by icons, an episcopal chair, silks, Coptic textiles and ceramics from both Byzantium and Greece, as well as Eastern Europe, the Near East, Russia, Egypt, and Ethiopia.

=== Non-European civilisations ===
This section showcases the important collections of artefacts from Asian countries, such as China, Japan, Korea, Southeast Asia, as well as the Americas (showing pre-Columbian civilisations and contemporary societies), Oceania (particularly Easter Island) and the Islamic world.

==== Islamic art ====
The diversity of peoples and cultures that make up the Islamic world is reflected in works from Spain (Al-Andalus), North Africa, the Near and Middle East, and India. These testimonies, among which textiles and ceramics are the best represented artistic disciplines, span from the 8th to the 20th centuries.

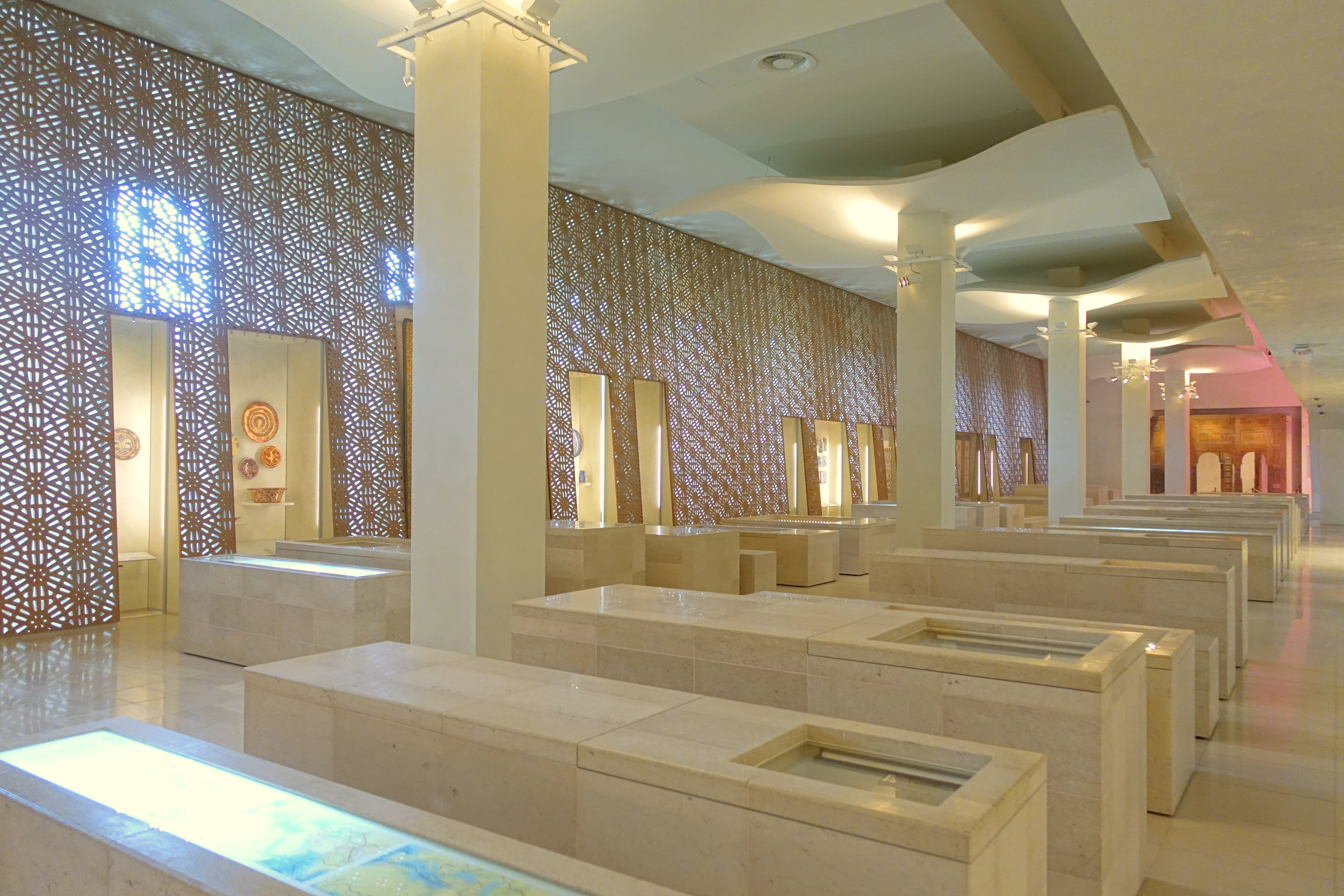
View of the Islamic art collection

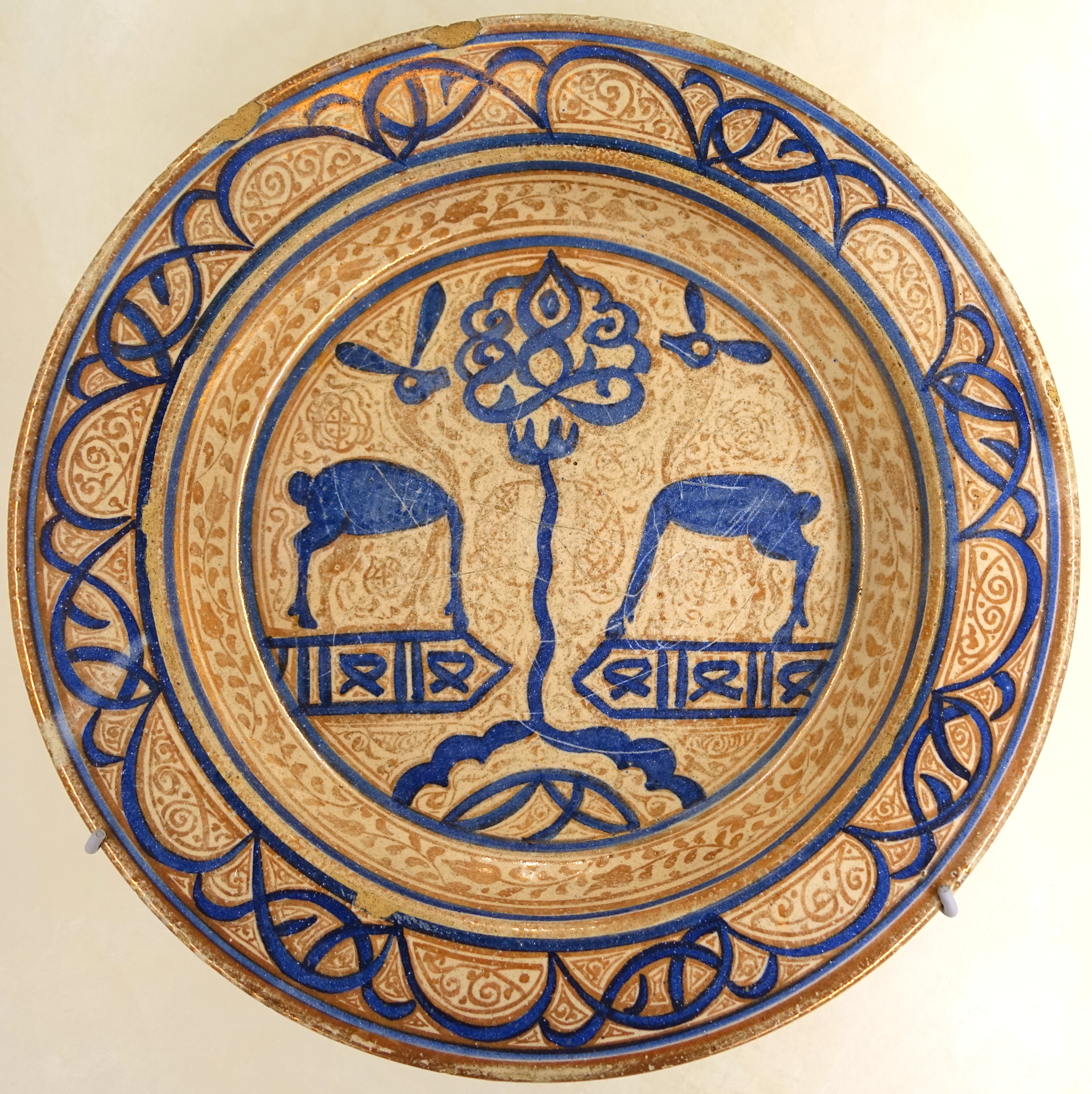
Glazed ceramic plate, Hispano-Moresque ware, Valencia (Spain), first half of the 15th century

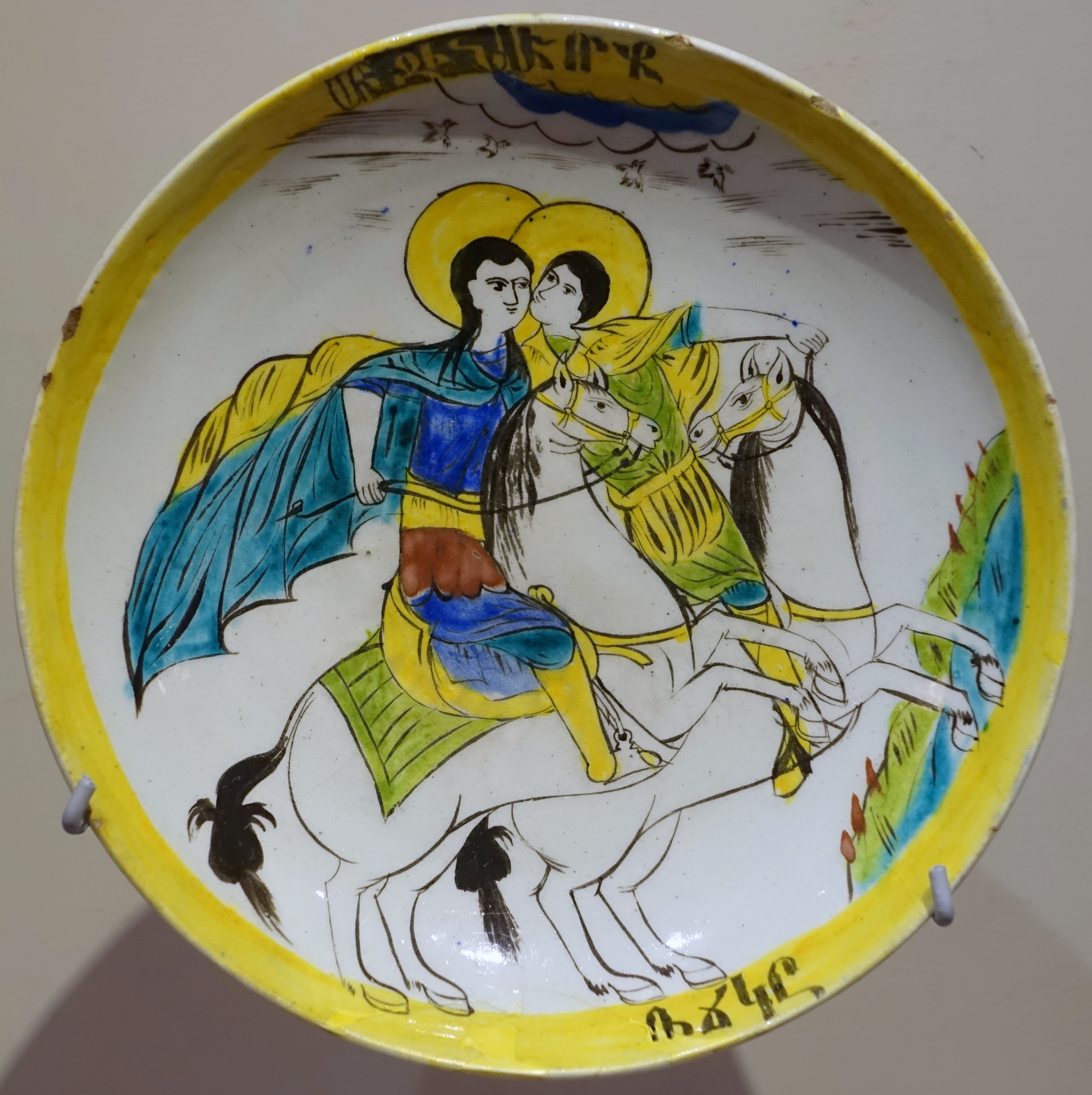
Holy knights glazed ceramic plate, Kütahya (Turkey), c. 1718–1719

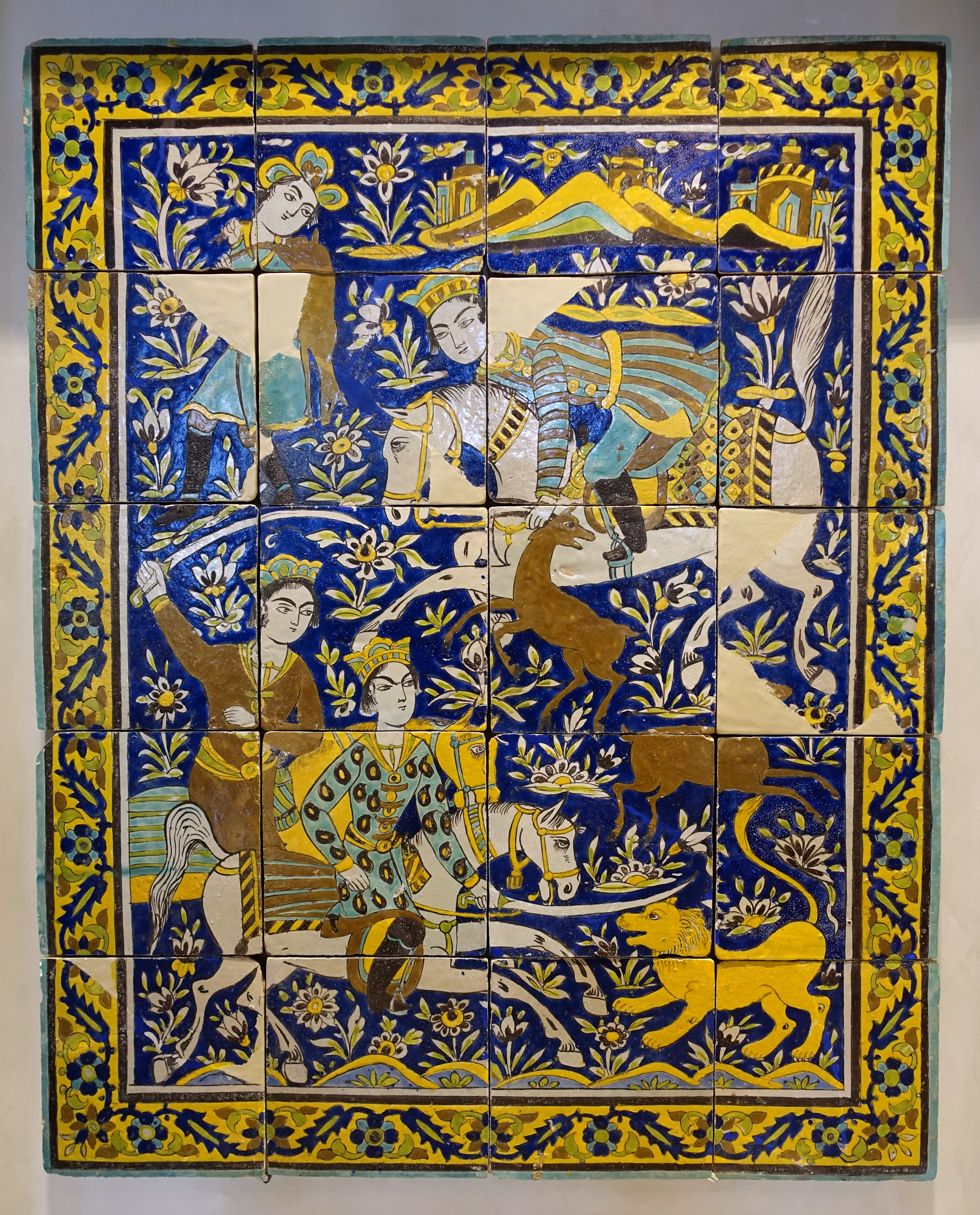
Glazed ceramic tile panel with hunting scene, Iran, c. 18th–19th century

==== Asia ====
Works from China, Korea, India and Southeast Asia allow visitors to discover the secular and religious world of this vast continent with diverse cultures and religions. Vietnamese ceramics, Tibetan paintings, Khmer sculptures, Laos drums, delicate Chinese jades and an Indonesian puppet theatre are some examples.

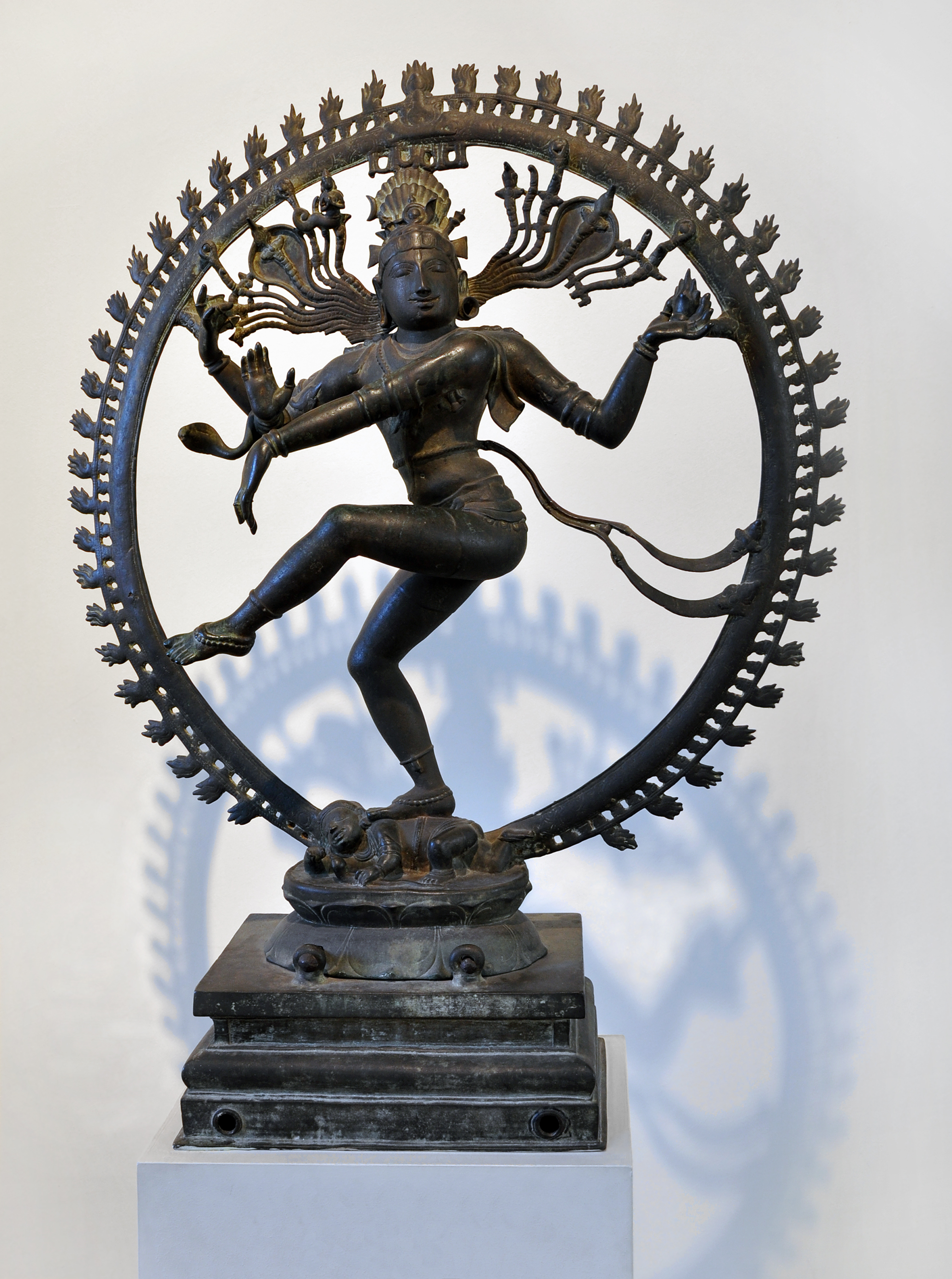
Bronze Shiva Nataraja sculpture, Chola style, from Tanjore (southern India), 13th century

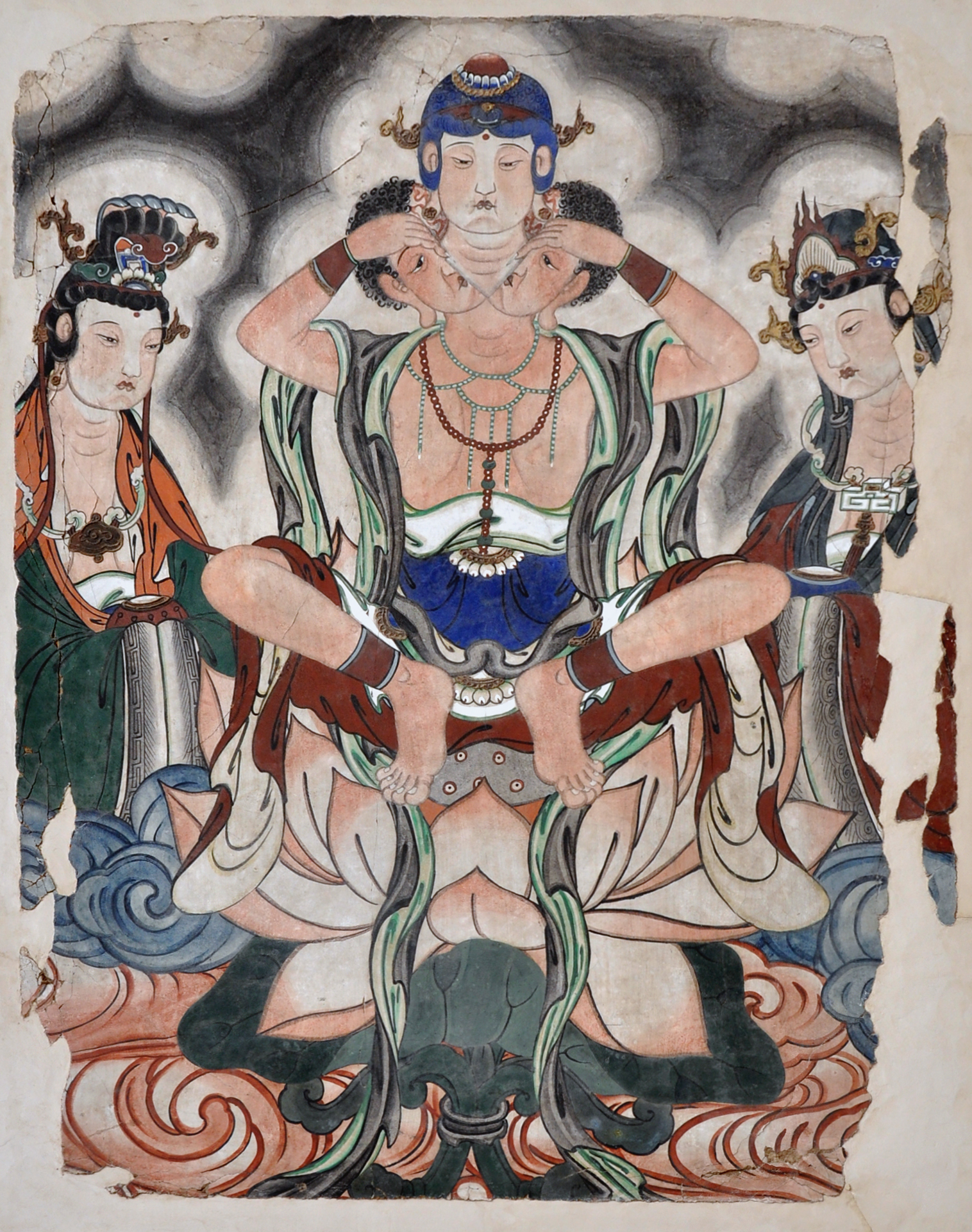
The metamorphosis of the monk Baozhi temple wall painting, Shanxi or Hebei (northern China), 17th century

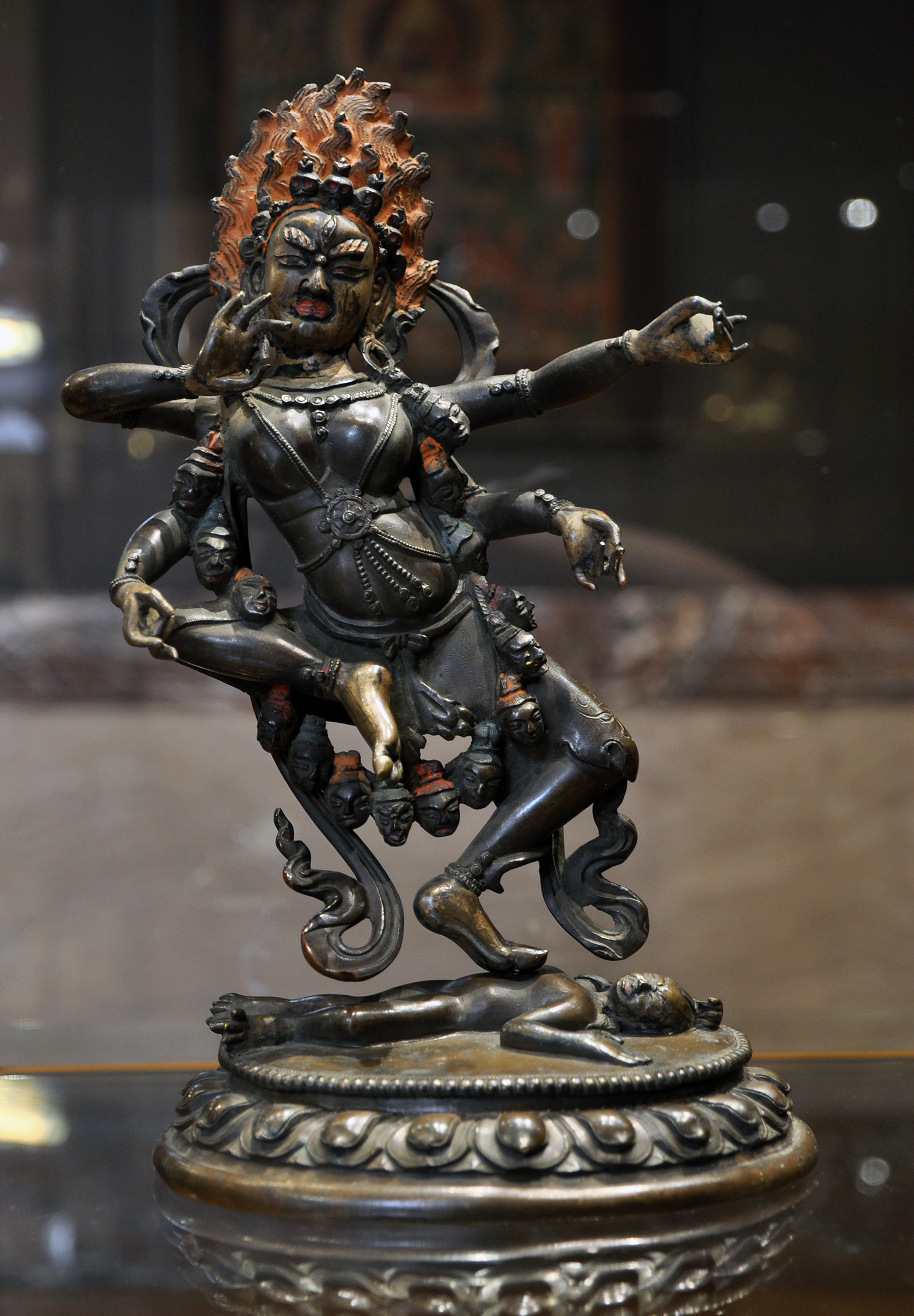
Fierce goddess bronze statuette, Tibet (China)

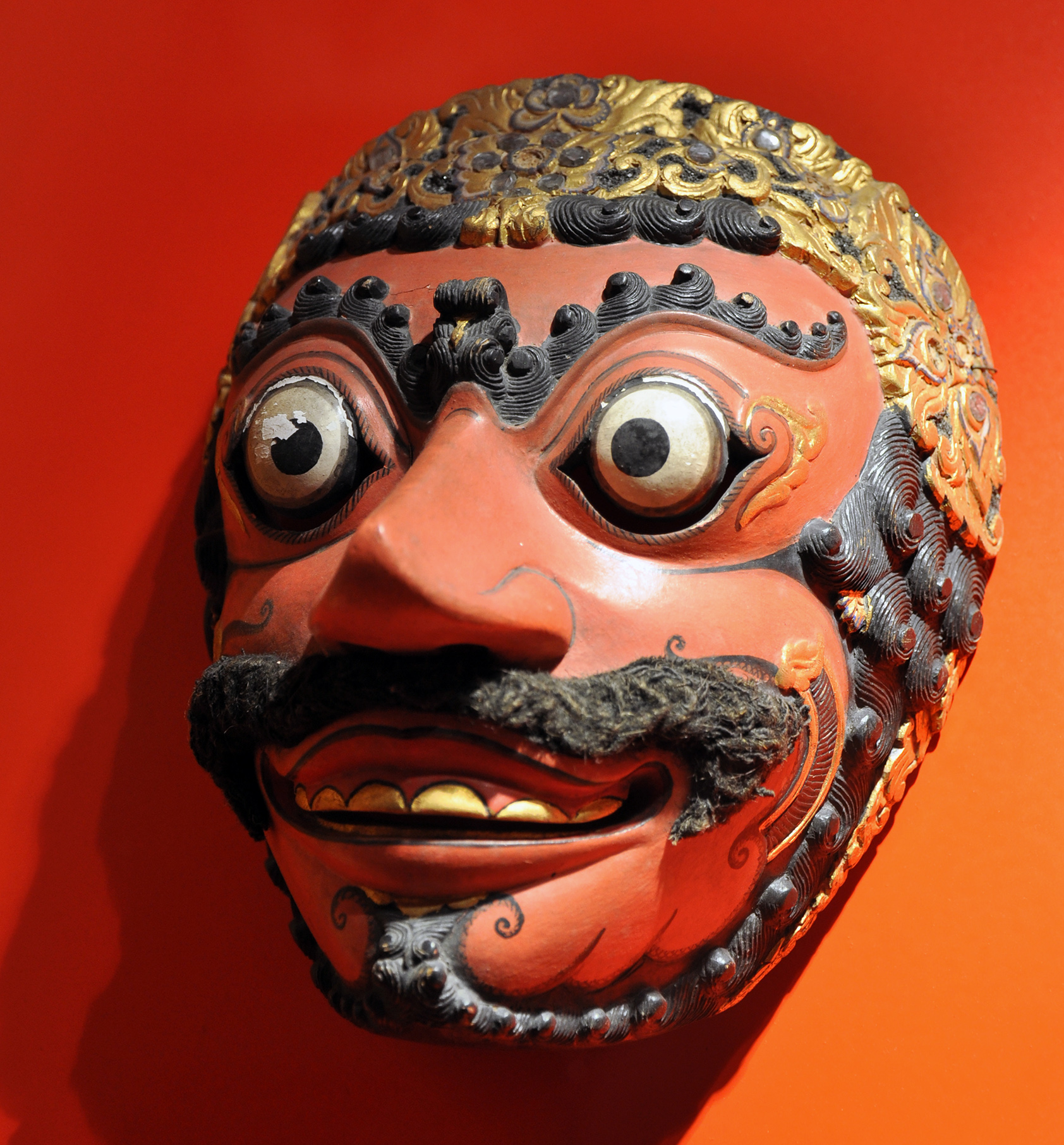
Theatre mask (Wayang Topeng), Java (Indonesia), possibly 19th century

==== Polynesia and Micronesia ====
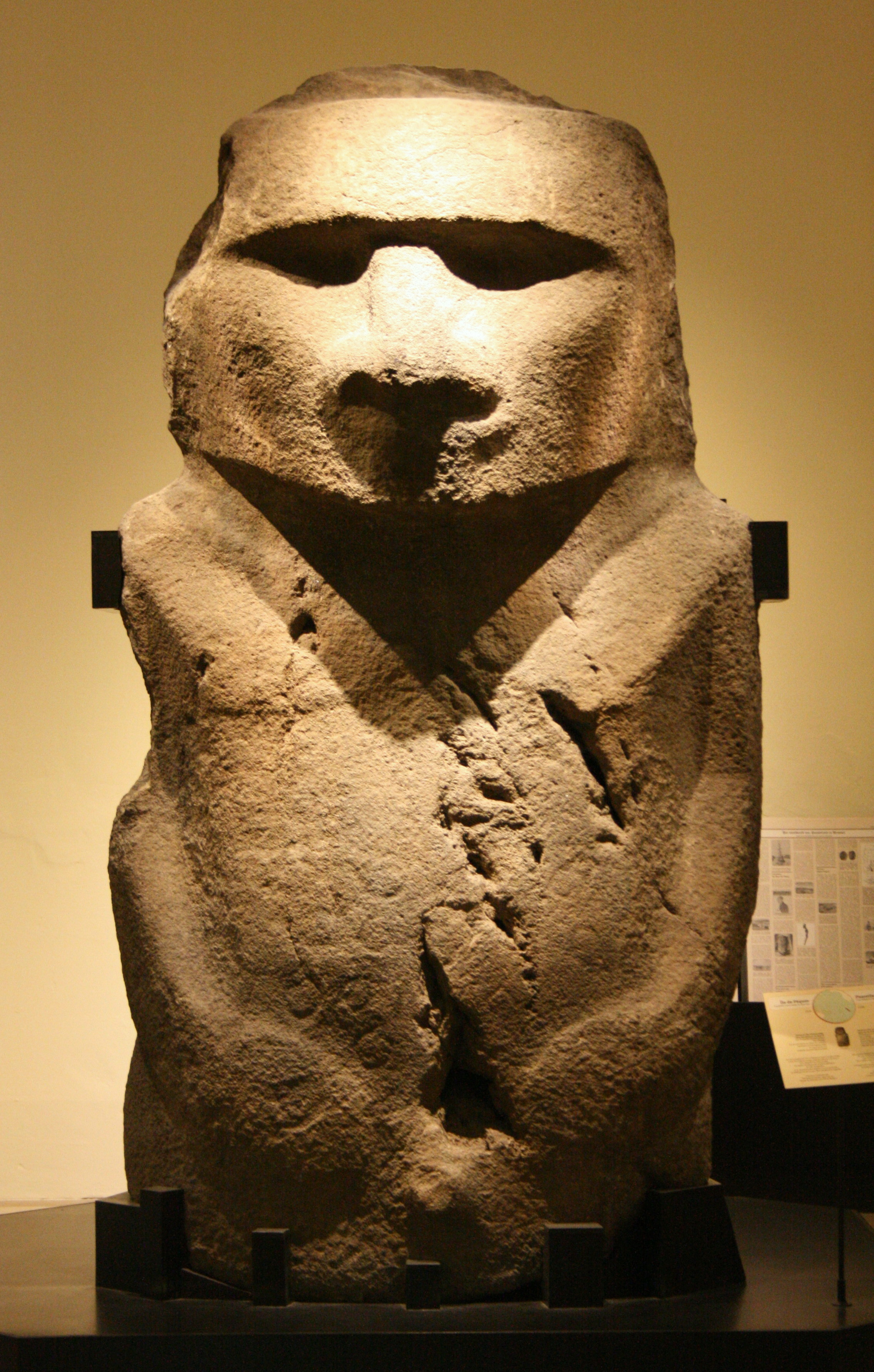
Statue of Pou Hakanononga, the tuna fishing god, Easter Island, late 13th century

The collections devoted to Polynesia and Micronesia bring together archaeological and ethnographic objects evoking daily life, weaving, the work of bark, stone, wood and bone. One of the centrepieces is undoubtedly the colossal sculpture of Pou Hakanononga, the god of tuna, brought back from Easter Island in 1935 by the Belgian training ship Mercator.

==== America ====
The museum holds the largest collection of Ancient American artefacts in Europe. Through 4,000 years of history, from 2000 BC to the present day, statuettes, painted vases, and jewellery revive the Inca, Mayan and Aztec civilisations. The ethnographic collections also make it possible to discover the feathered art of the native people of Amazonia (such as the Moctezuma coat) and the first nations of North America, represented in particular by the impressive totem pole that welcomes visitors who enter these rooms.

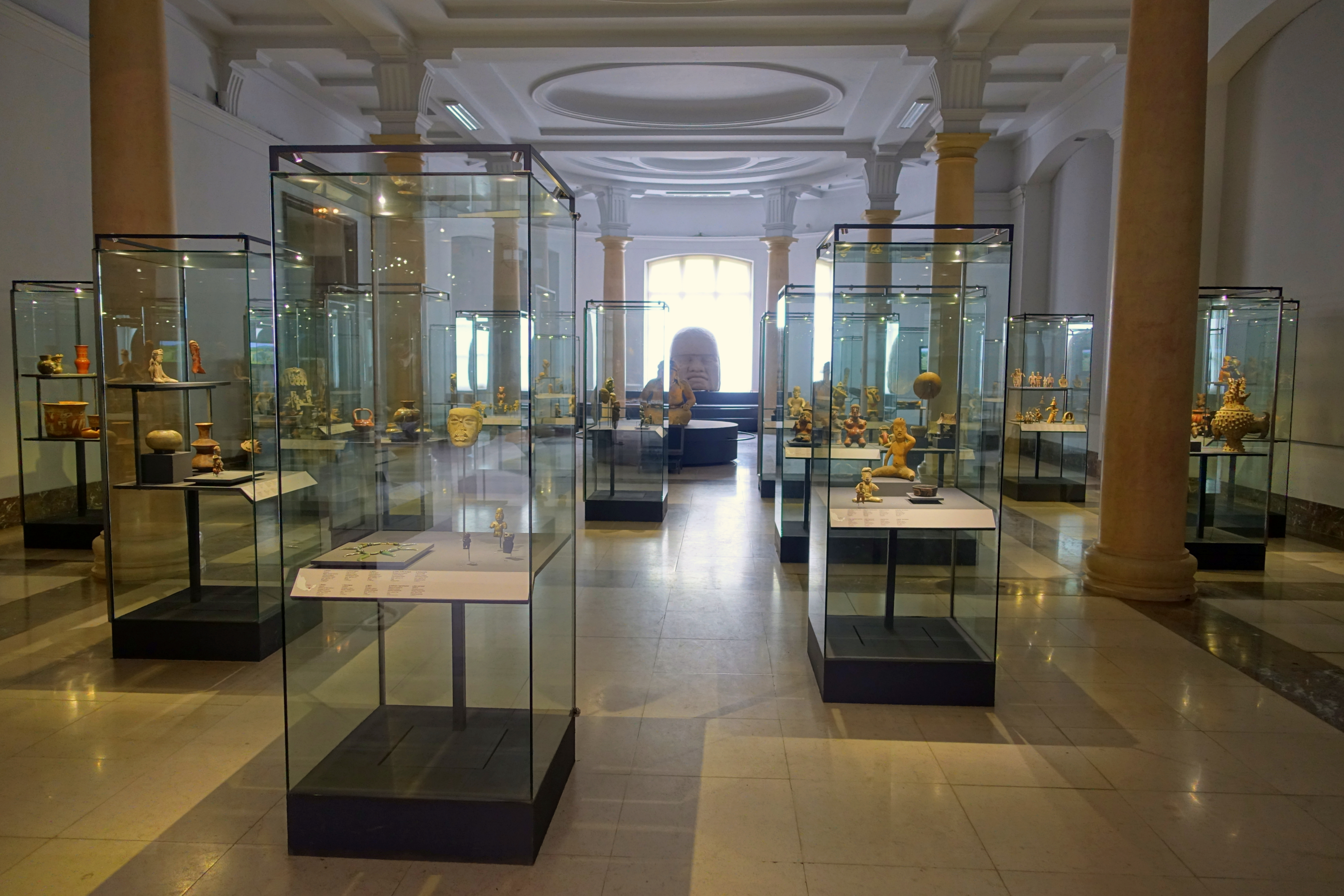
View of the American collection

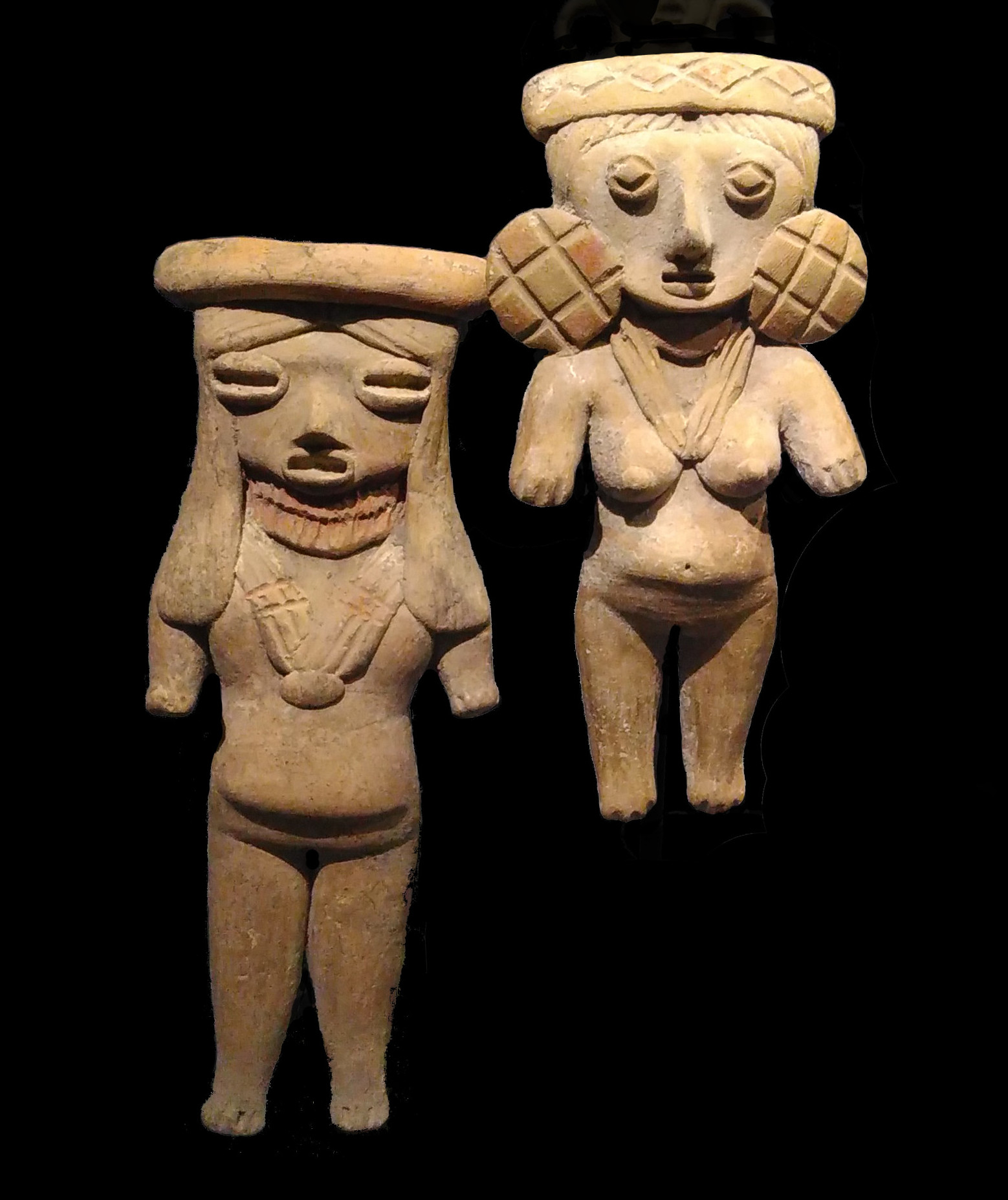
Pretty Ladies pre-classic clay figurines, Chupicuaro culture, Guanajuato (Mexico), c. 400–100 BC

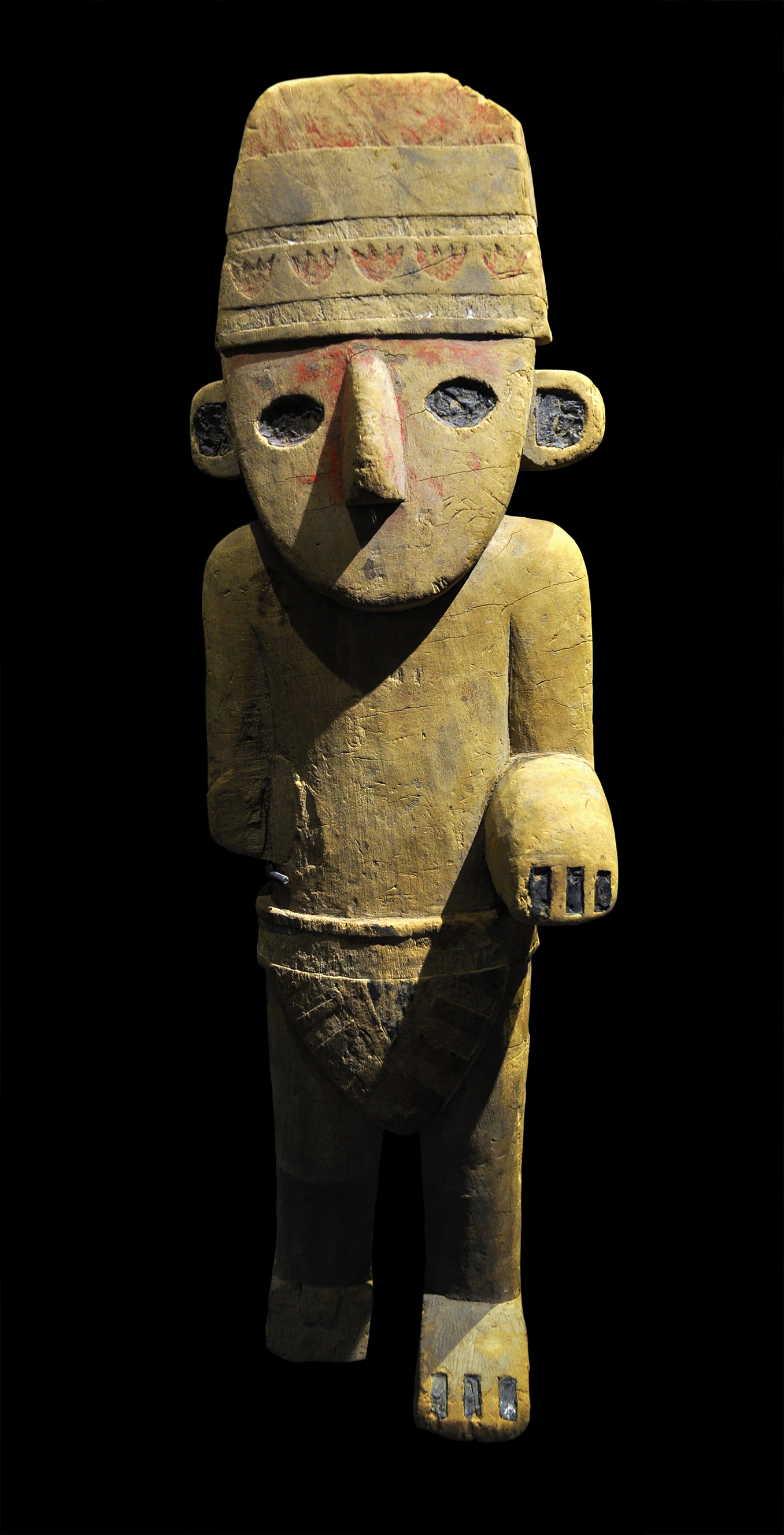
Offerings bearer wooden sculpture, Chimú culture, northern Peru, c. 1100–1470

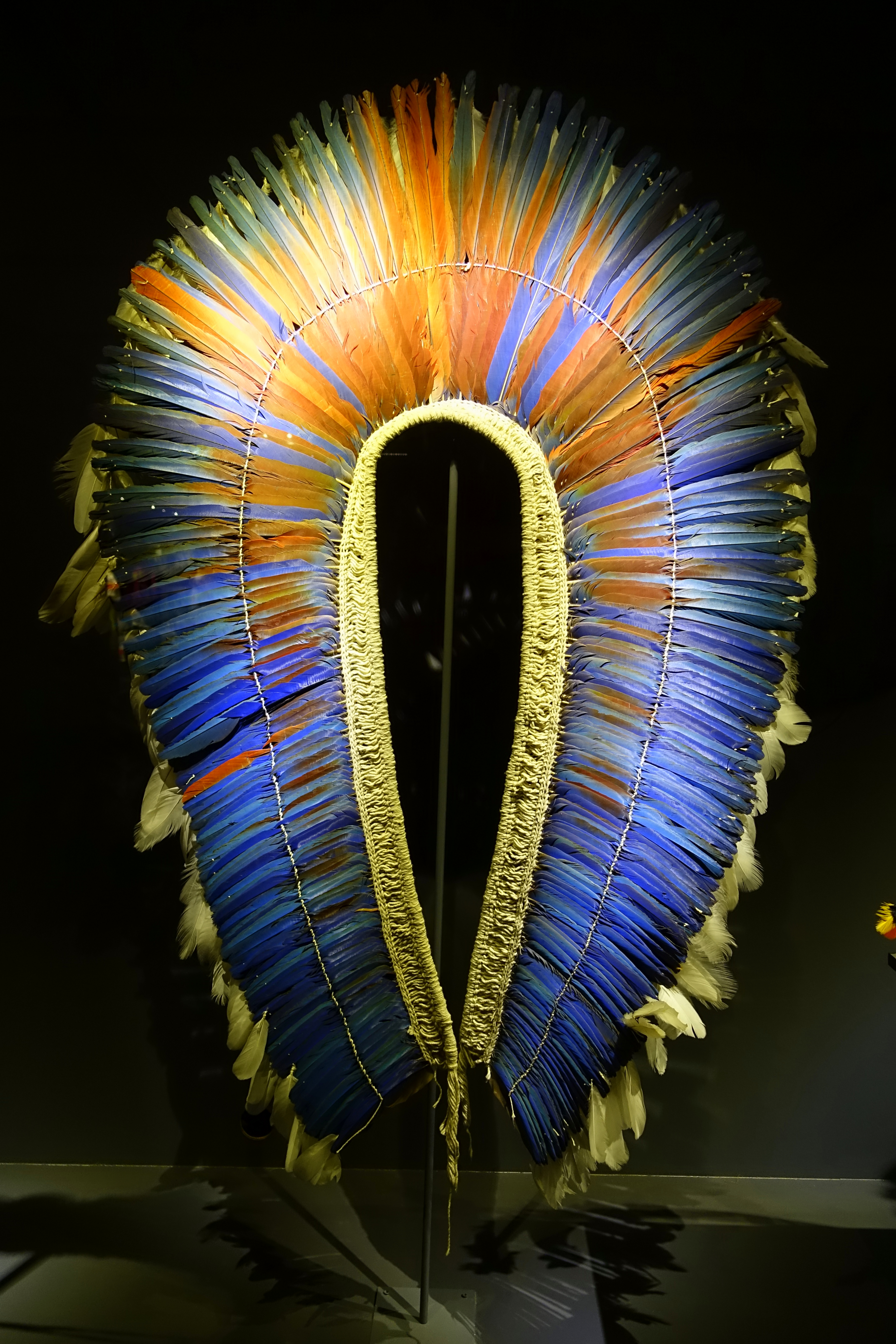
Headdress, Kayapo culture, Pará or Mata Grosso (Brazil), 20th century

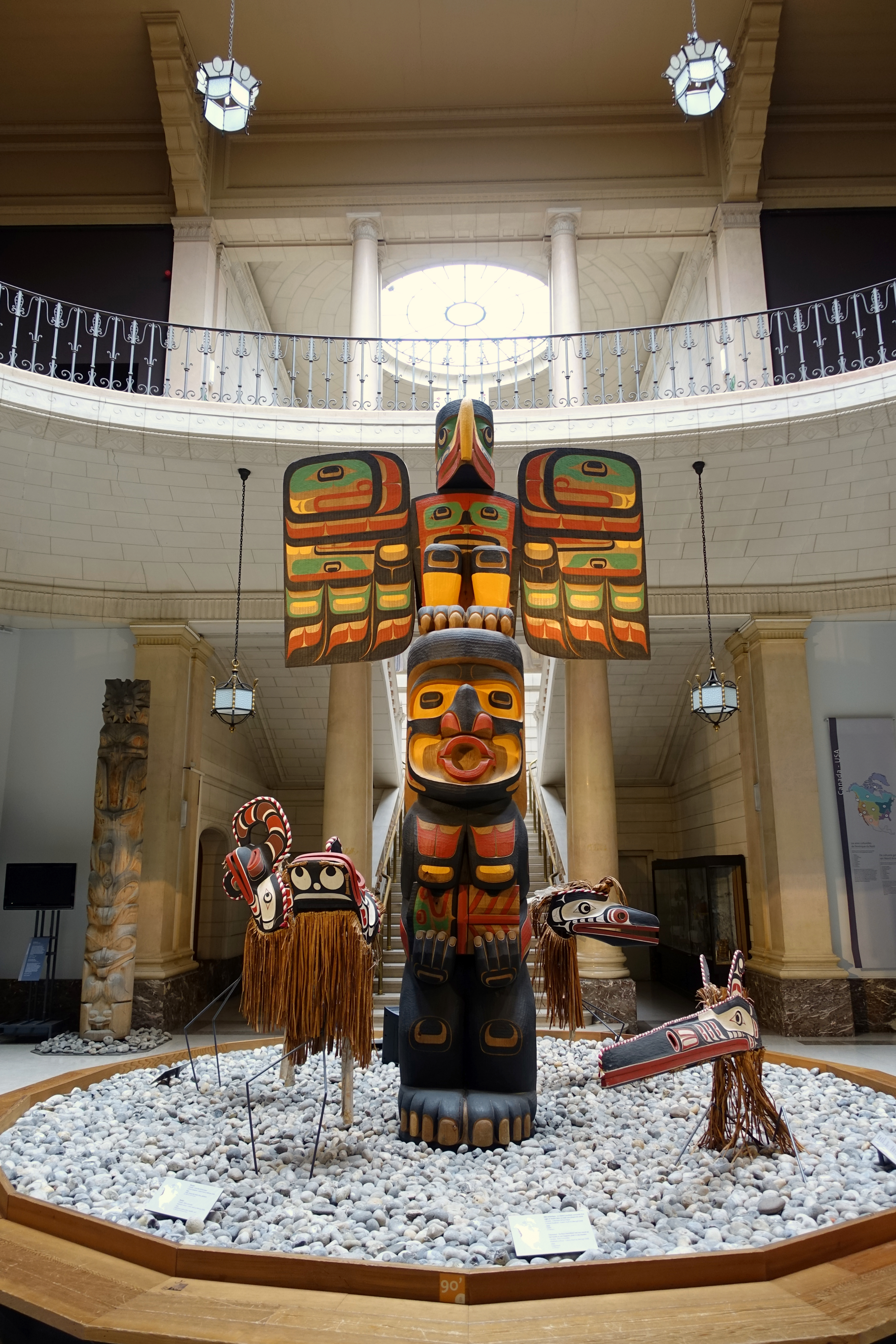
Native American totem pole

=== European decorative arts ===
This section is dedicated to the fine arts from the Middle Ages to the 20th century, showing sculptures, furniture, ceramics, metals, and glassware. There is an important and large department of textiles, including Flemish tapestries, costumes and dress, as well as needle lace and bobbin lace (parts from the royal collection). Horse-drawn vehicles, as well as photographic and cinematographic equipment, are also on display.

==== The Treasure room and Mosan art ====
The panorama of industrial arts opens with Mosan masterpieces of goldsmithery, presented in the Treasure room with the atmosphere of a medieval crypt. In the access corridor, stained glass windows and textiles from the same period are exposed.

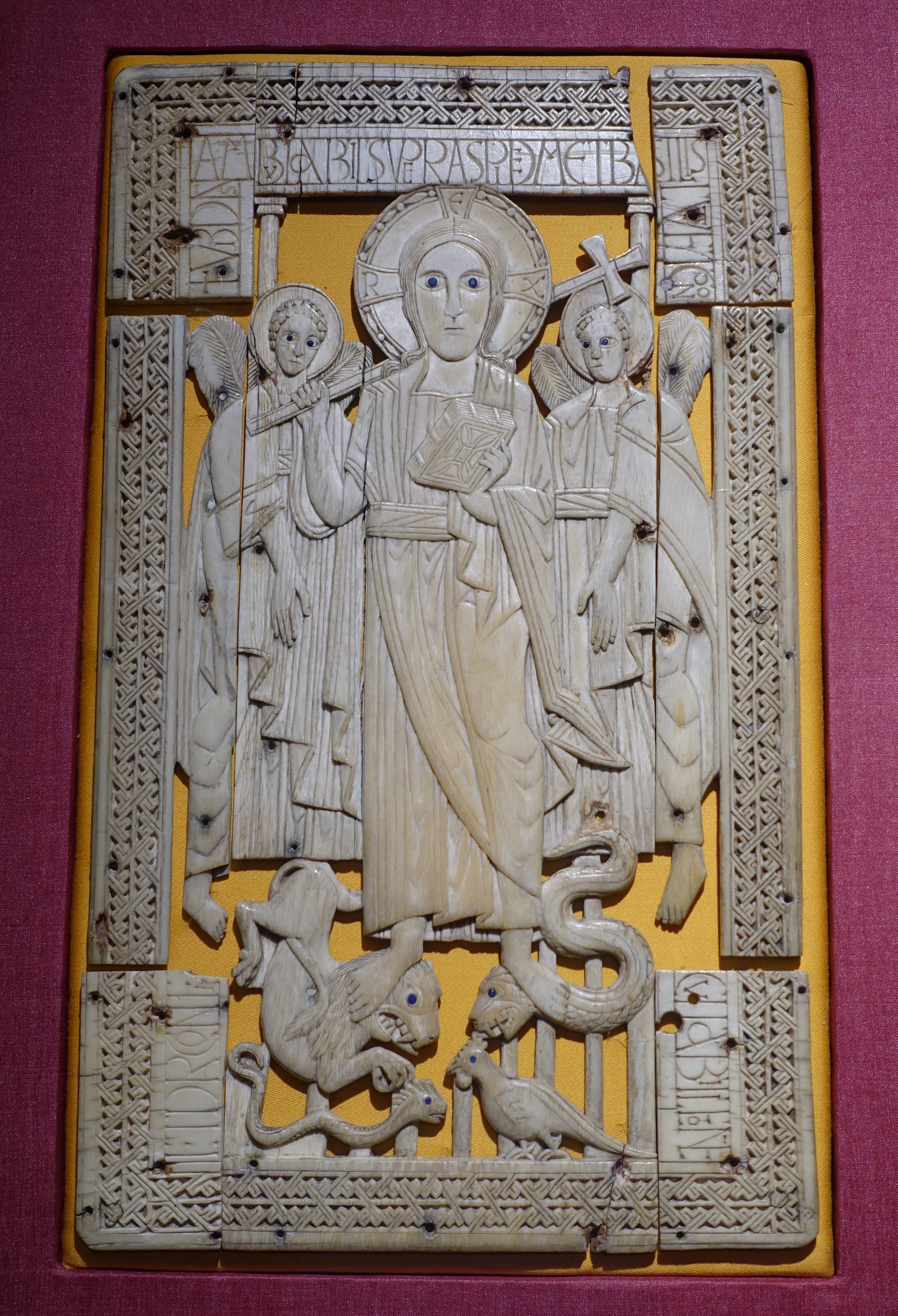
Ivory plaque with blue glass from Genoelselderen (Belgium), late 8th century

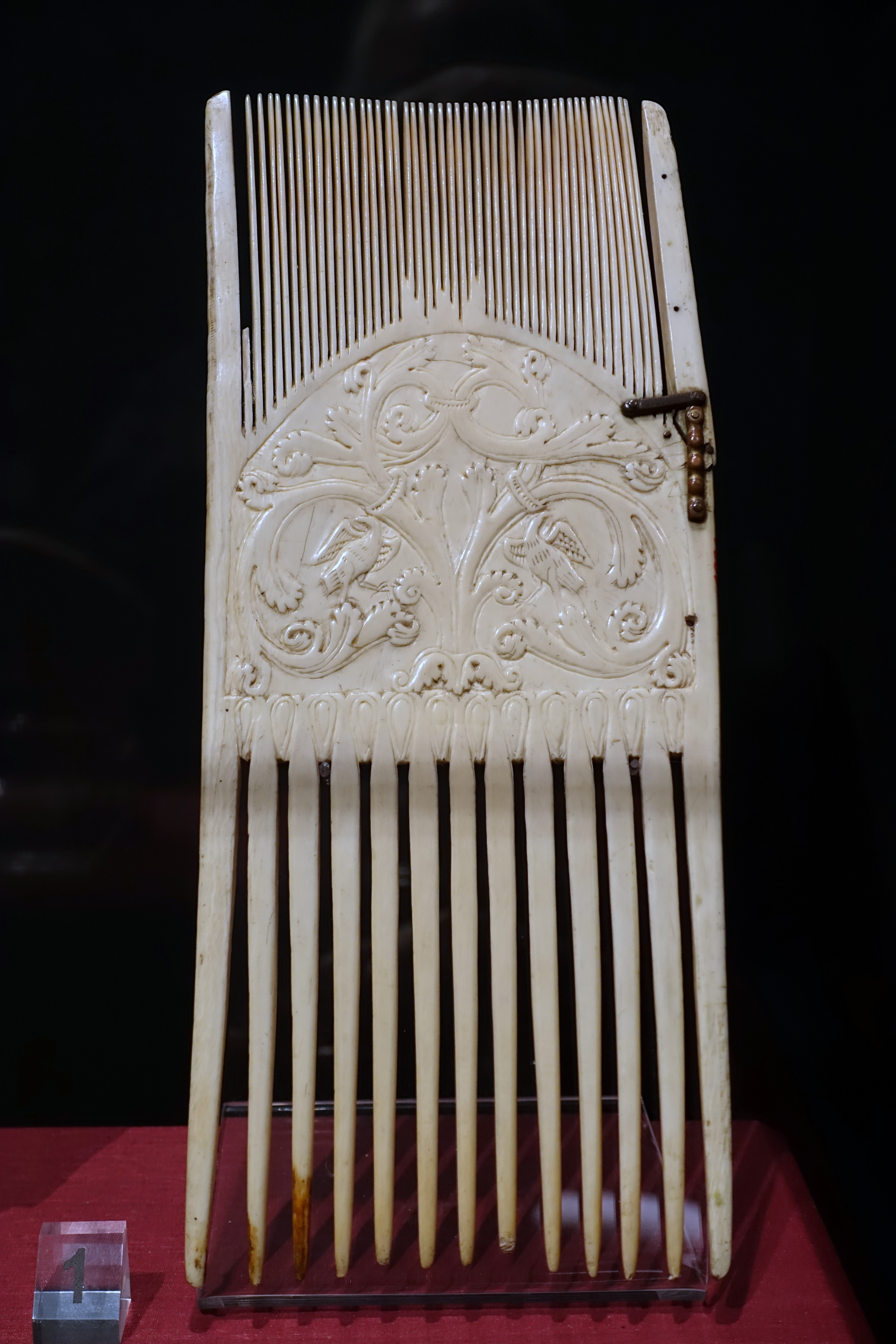
Ivory liturgical comb from the former Abbaye of Saint-Remacle in Stavelot (Belgium), 10th century

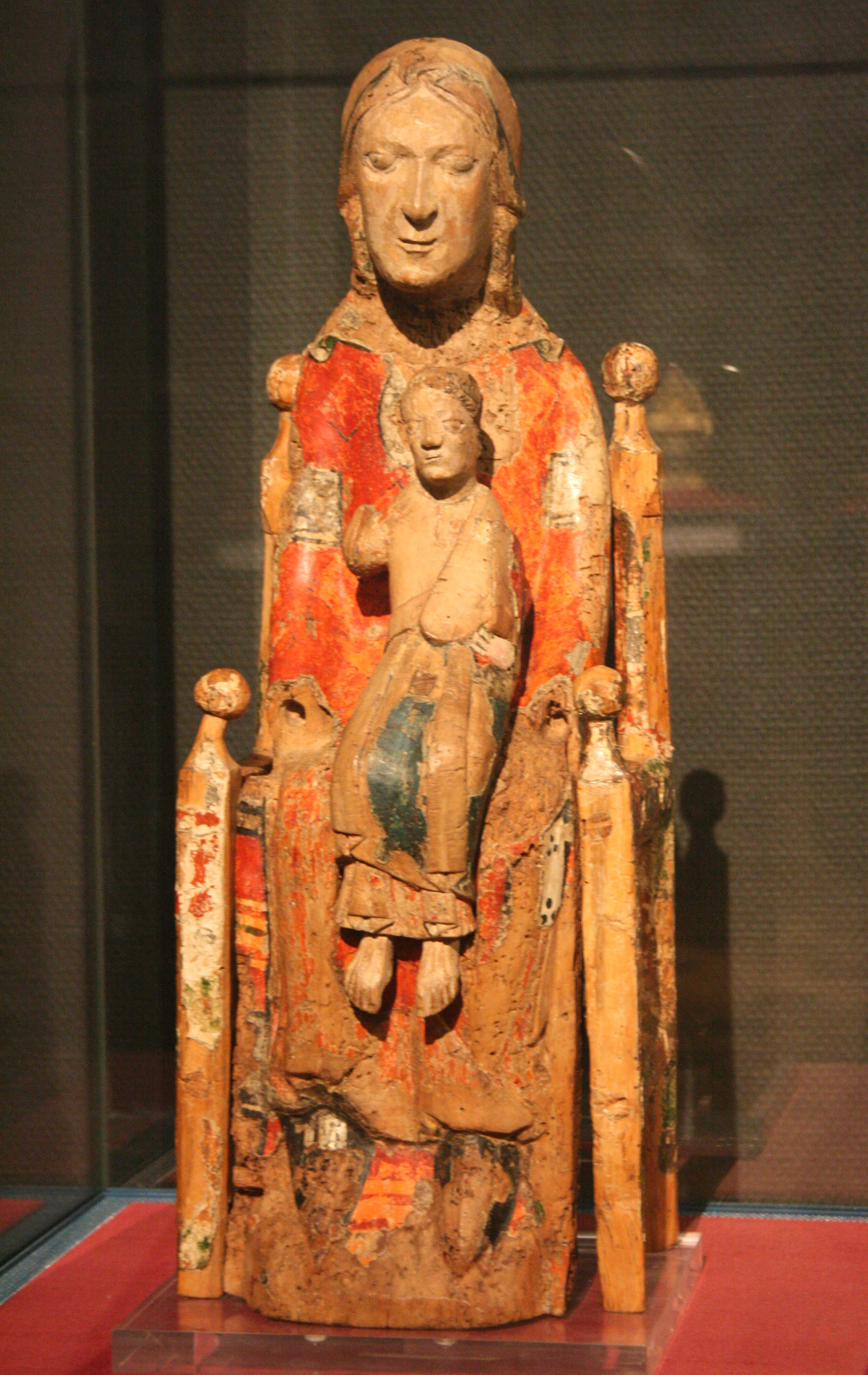
Virgin and child, Mosan art, 11th century

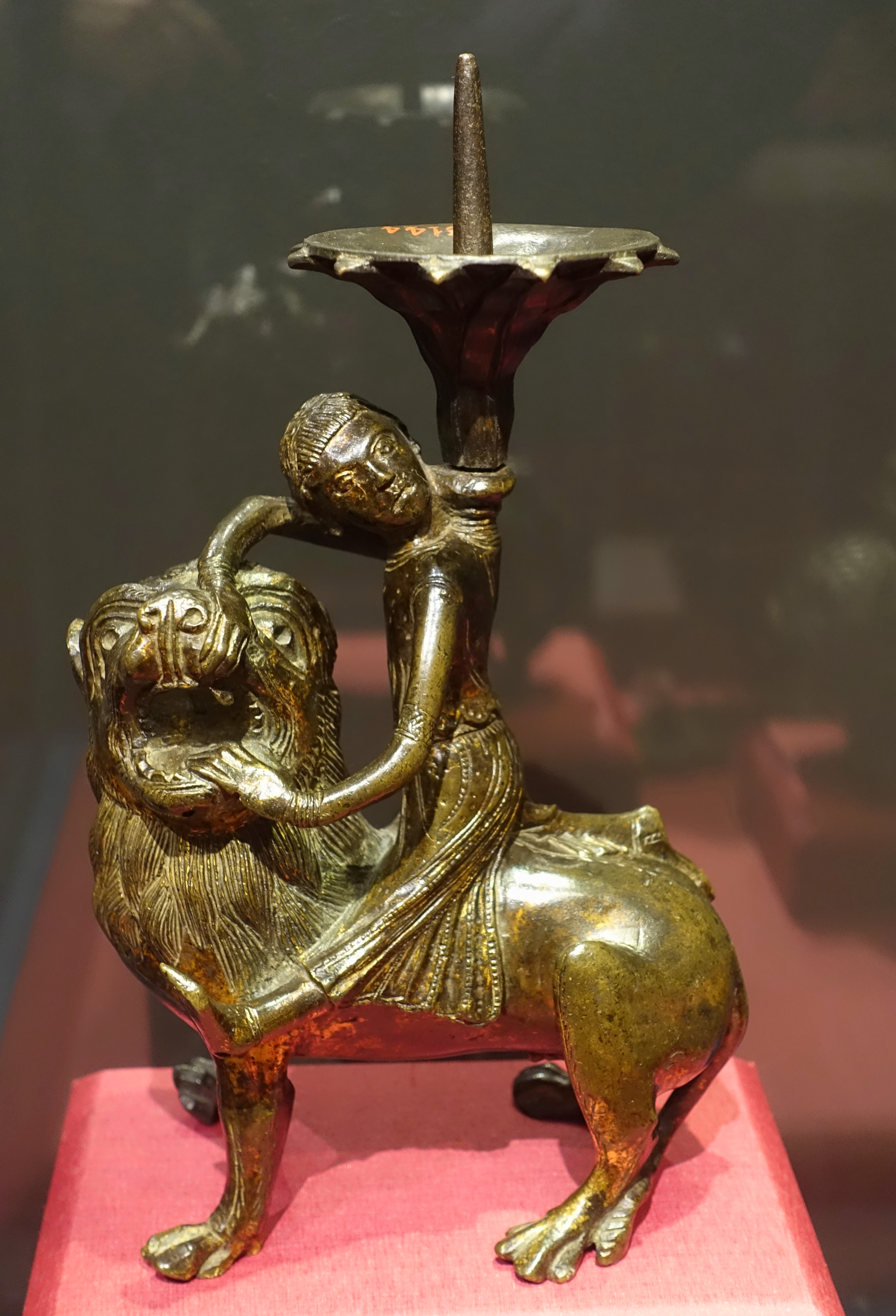
Gilt copper candlestick of Samson with lion, probably from Dinant (Belgium), c. 1200–1250

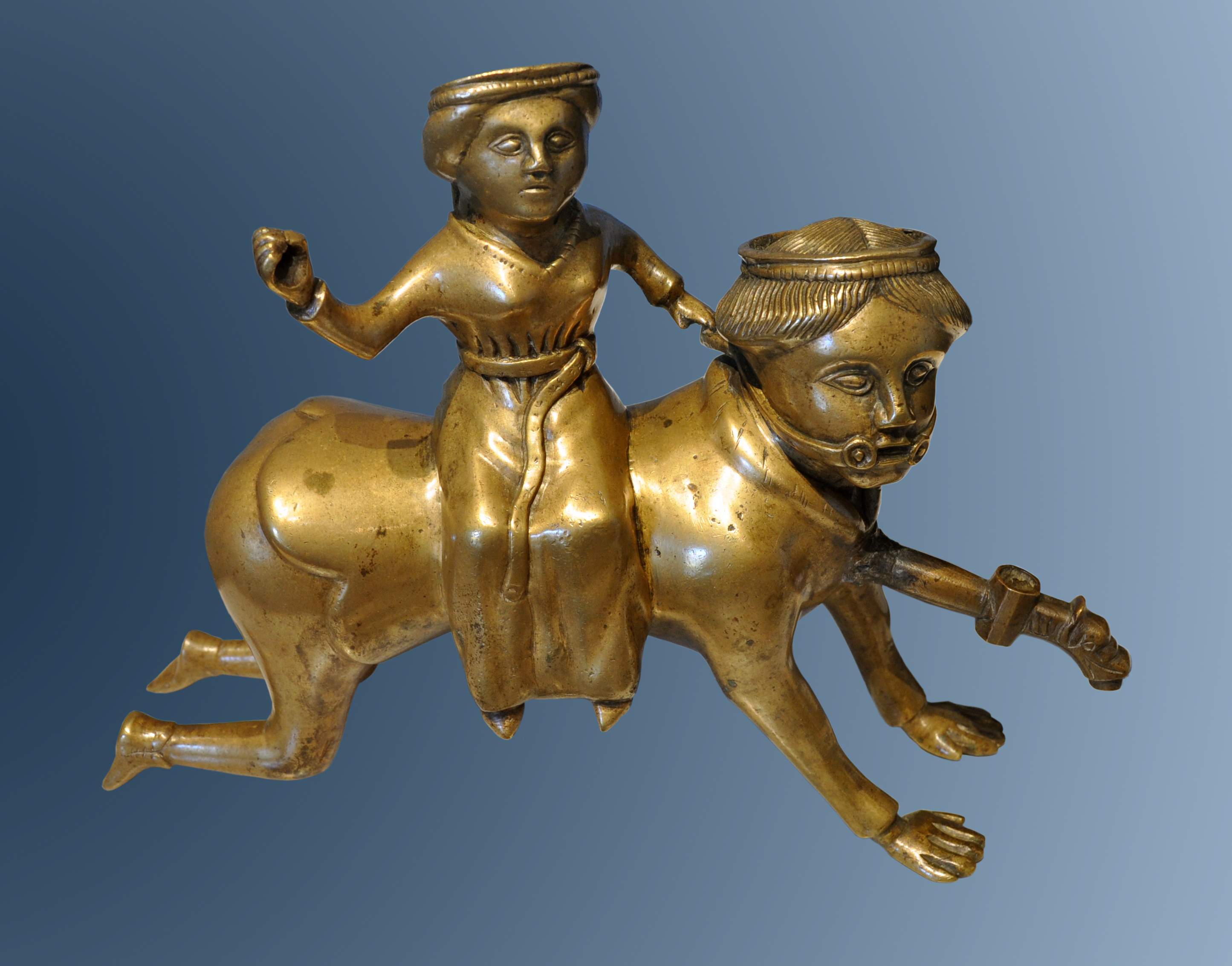
Aquamanile in the form of Phyllis and Aristotle, perhaps Mosan region, c. 1400–1450

==== From the Gothic period to the Baroque period ====
A circuit around the Gothic cloister then leads visitors from the 13th to the 17th centuries, the golden age of the Southern Netherlands. In addition to sculptures, stained glass, ceramics, silverware, altarpieces and tapestries from the 15th and 16th centuries constitute a notable collection recognised for its size and quality.

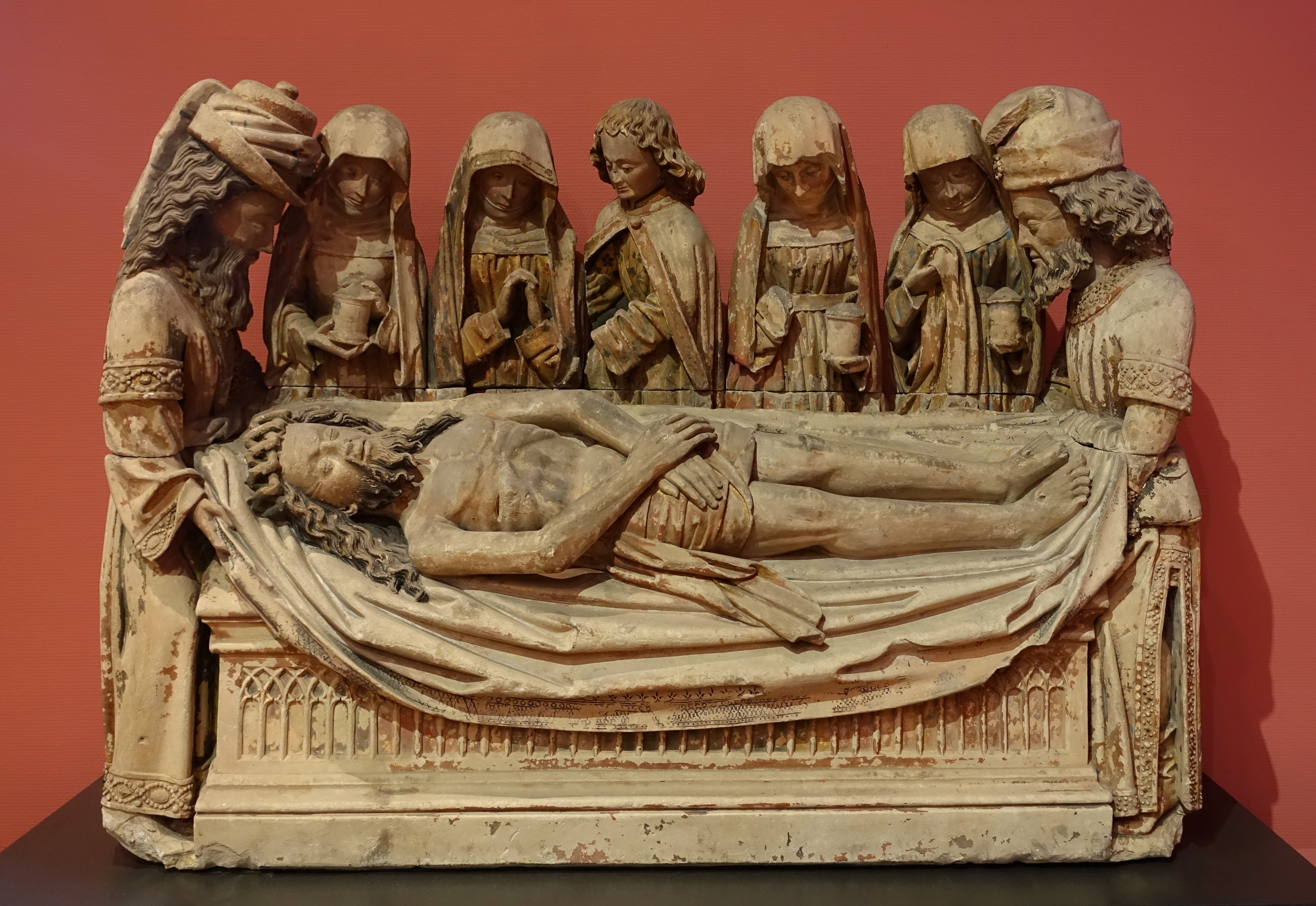
Entombment of Christ, from Hautrage, Hainaut (Belgium), c. 1502–1505

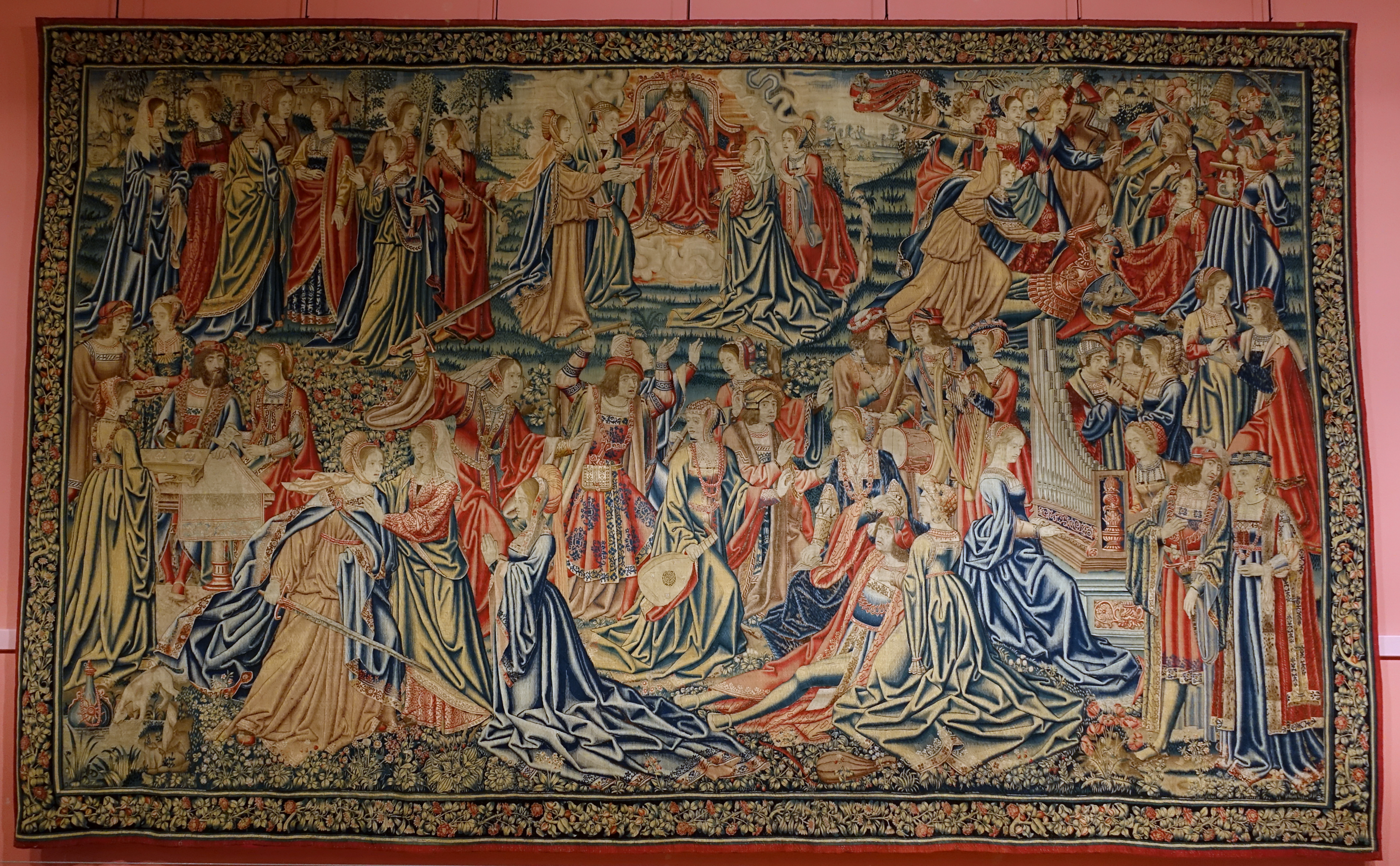
Judgment of Paradise tapestry, Brussels, c. 1519

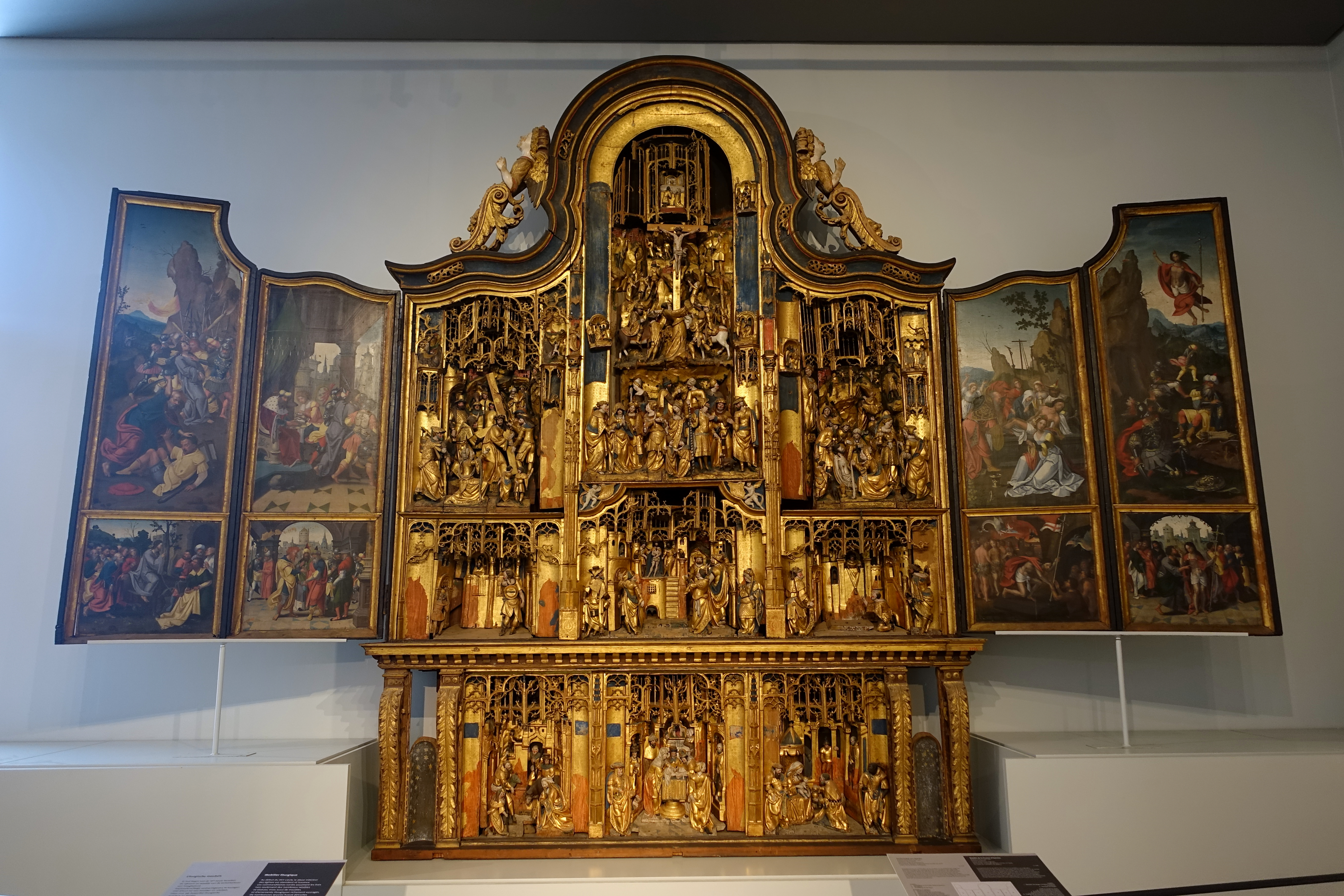
Altar with Passion scenes, from Oplinter, Flemish Brabant (Belgium), c. 1530–1540

==== From the Baroque period to the 20th century ====
Works dating from the 17th to the 20th centuries attest to the growing importance of secular art. Examples include the collection of Antwerp cabinets, the music room, and furniture from Liège. The highlight of this set is the reconstruction of the store designed by Victor Horta for Wolfers silversmiths, which serves as a backdrop for a selection of Art Nouveau and Art Deco works. In the Cinquantenaire Park, a small pavilion is associated with these collections. Designed by Horta, it houses the bas-relief of The Human Passions, sculpted by Jef Lambeaux.

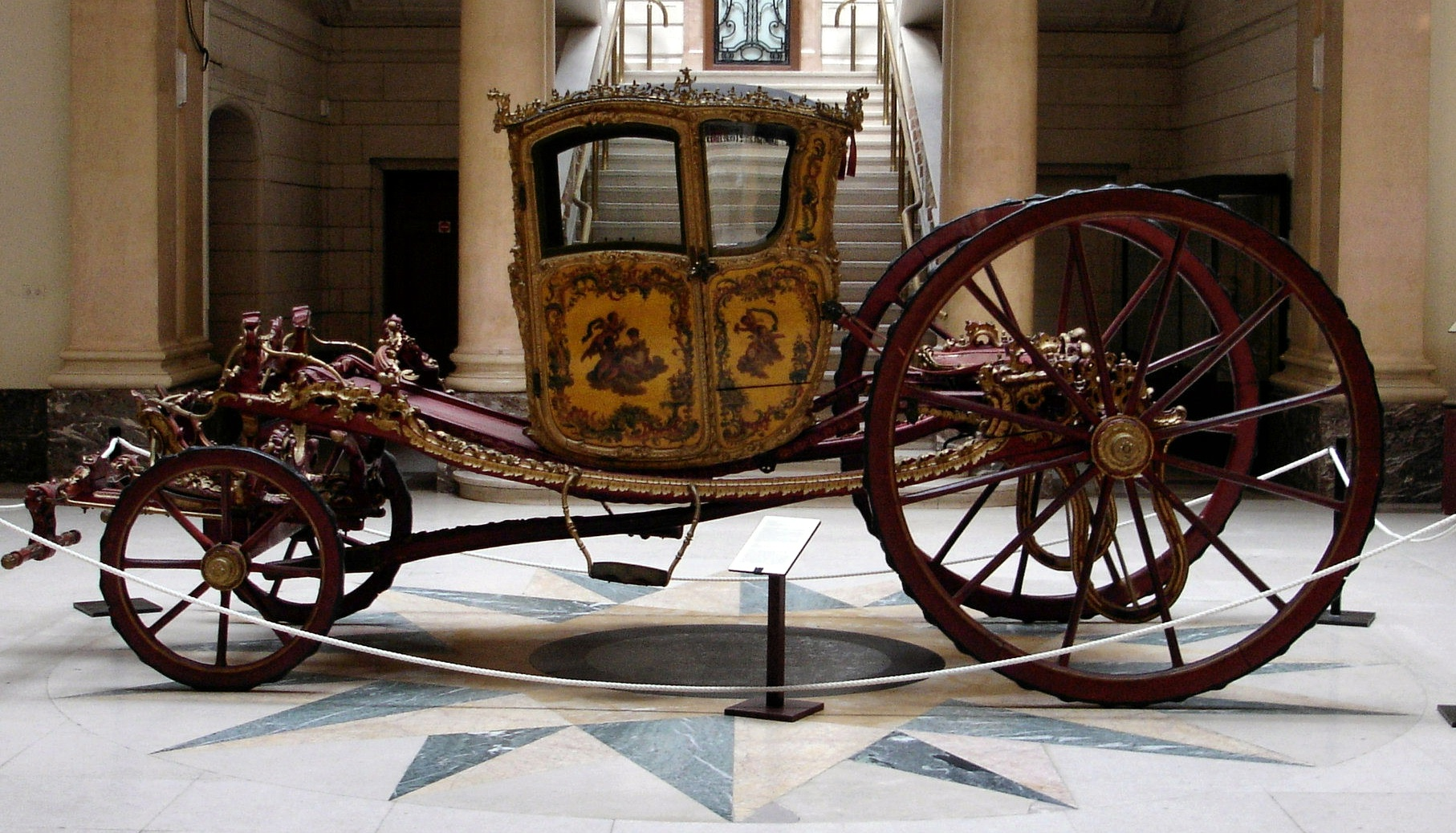
Carriage, 18th century

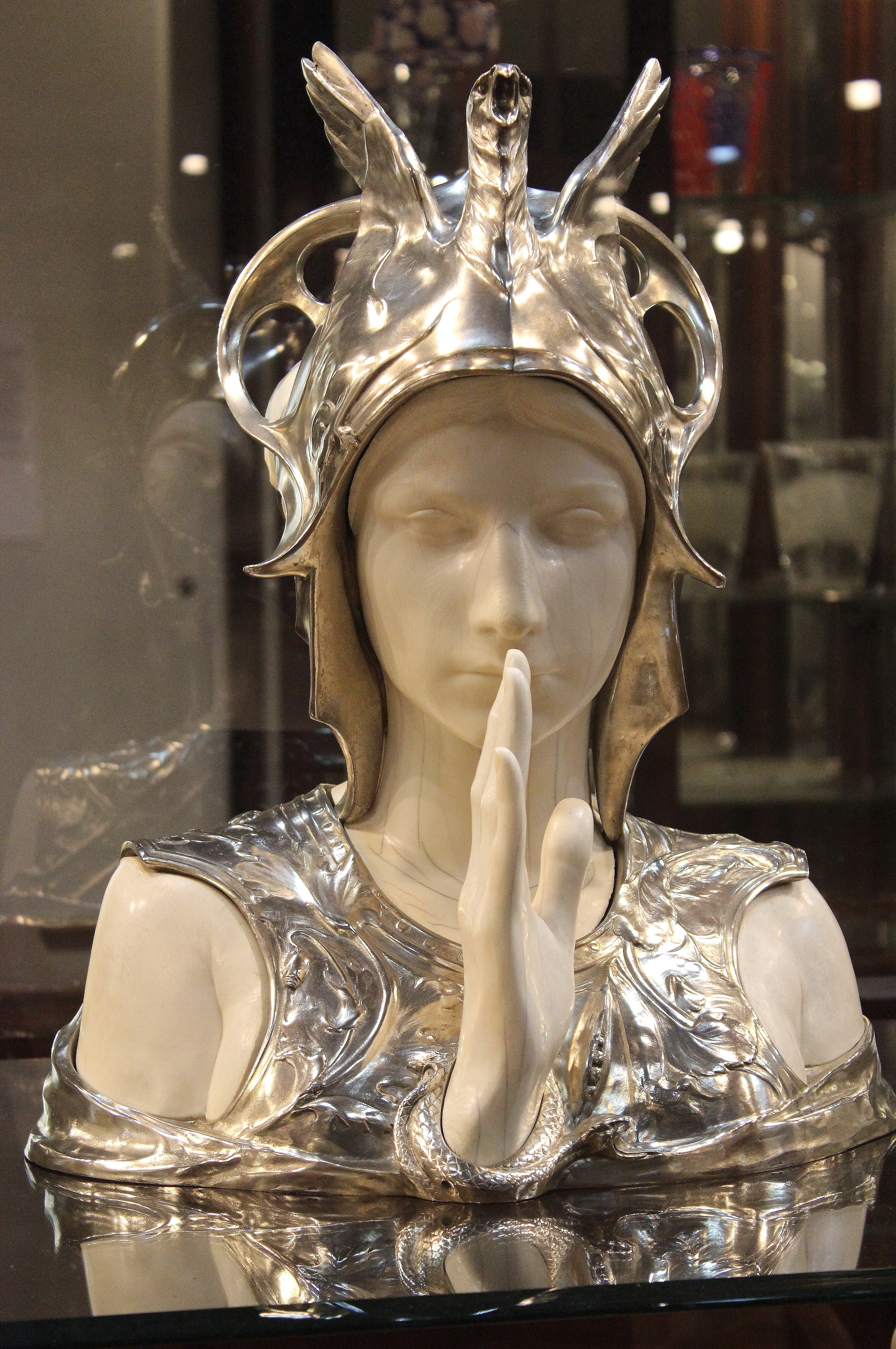
Le Sphynx mystérieux, Van der Stappen, 1897

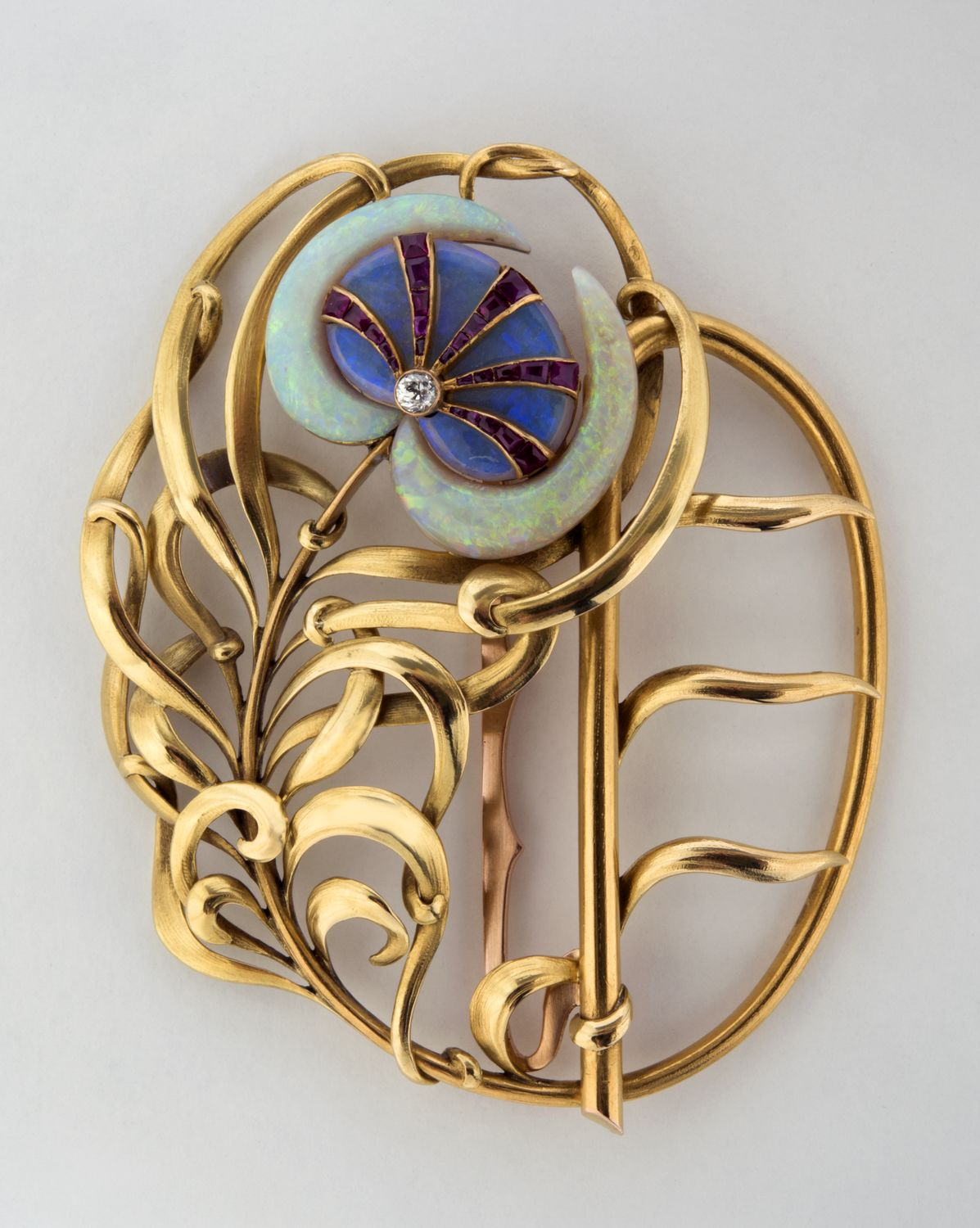
Plumes de Paon, Wolfers, 1898

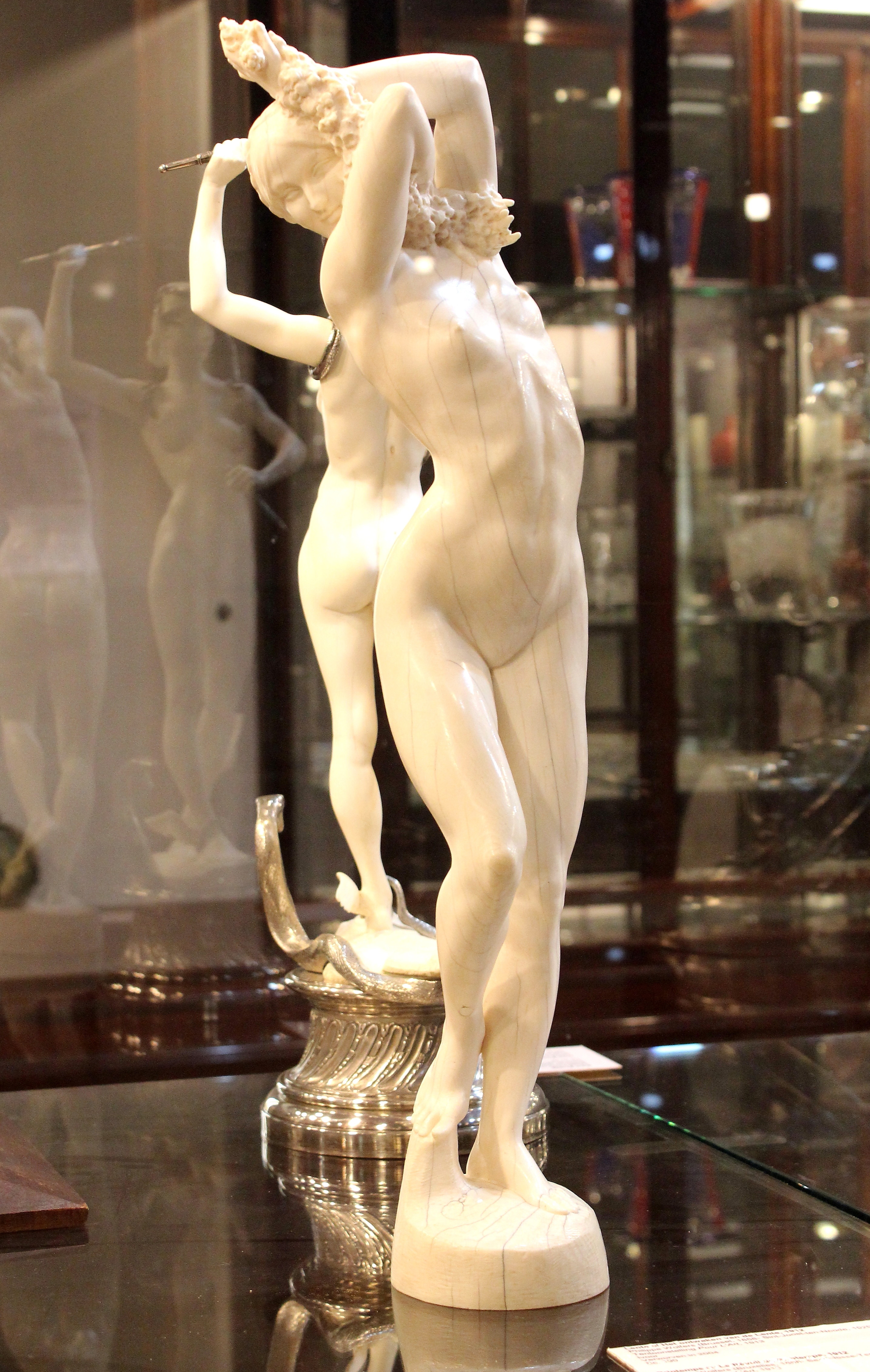
Printemps, Wolfers, 1912

==== The rooms by subject ====
Other rooms group works of art by subject. One of the most important copperware sets preserved is housed in the chapel. Glassware, stained glass, tinware, precision instruments, and European ceramics complete the evolution of the arts of fire. The lace room communicates with that of textiles and costumes. Cinematic and photographic devices as well as horse-drawn vehicles complete this vast panorama. There is also the Heart Museum, a room presenting the collection of the cardiologist Boyadjian and made up of objects referring to the heart in all its forms.

== See also ==
- Autoworld
- Mundaneum
- List of museums in Brussels
- History of Brussels
- Culture of Belgium
- Belgium in the long nineteenth century
