= Mutsaard =

Neighbourhood in Brussels, Belgium

Mutsaard: Quartier des Pagodes (French); Pagodenwijk (Dutch); De Wand
- Neighbourhood
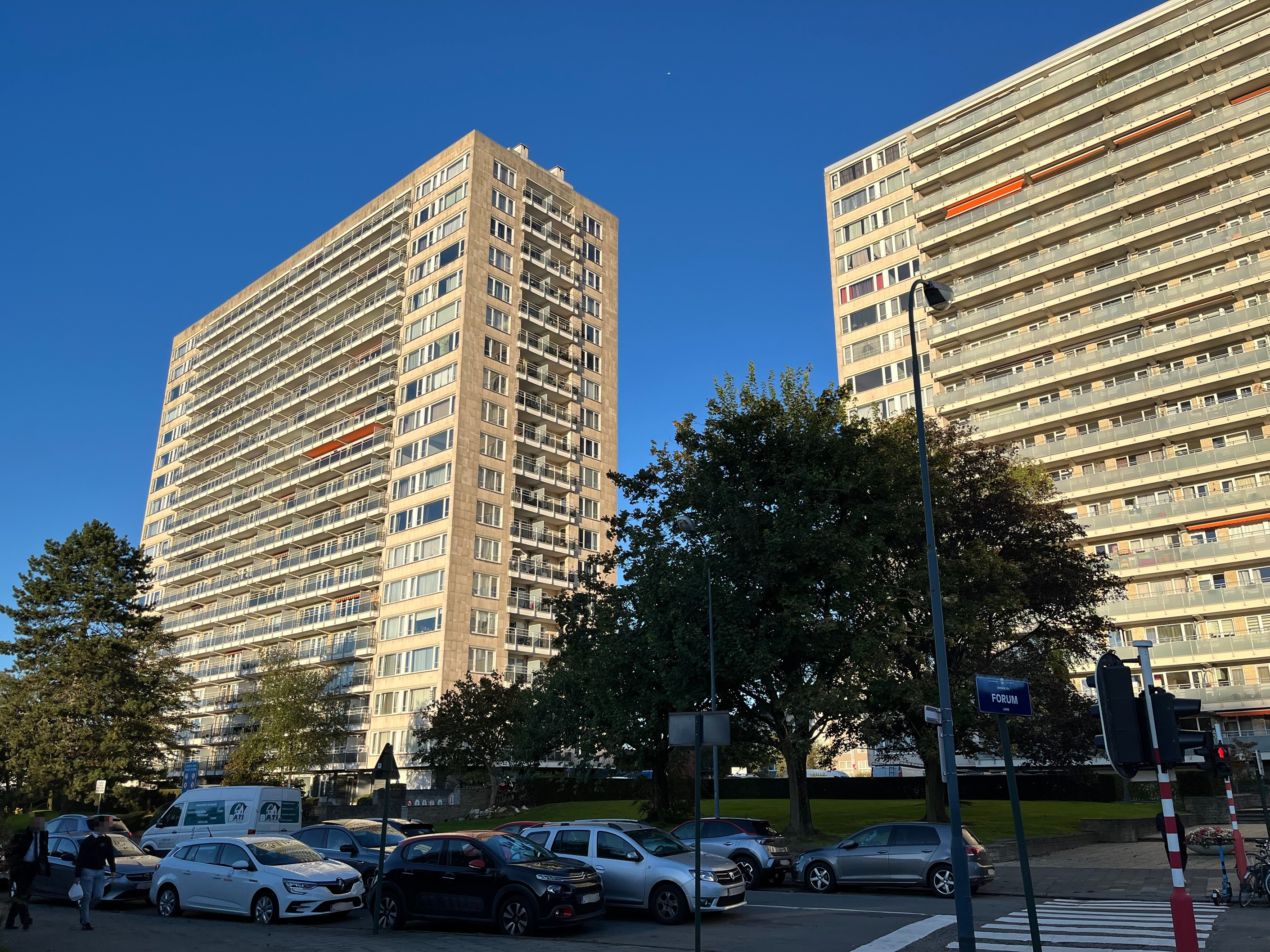
- Jupiter-Mercure and Orion-Sirius residences in the Mutsaard district

- Location within Brussels Mutsaard (Belgium)
- Coordinates: 50°54′4.187″N 4°21′37.973″E
- Country: Belgium
- Region: Brussels-Capital Region
- Arrondissement: Brussels-Capital
- Municipality: City of Brussels
- First mentioned: 1297
- Time zone: UTC+1 (CET)
  - Summer (DST): UTC+2 (CEST)
- Postal code: 1020
- Area codes: 02

Mutsaard or Mutsaert, also known as the Pagoda Quarter (French: Quartier des Pagodes; Dutch: Pagodenwijk) or De Wand, is an old hamlet and a historic neighbourhood of Brussels, Belgium. Located between Laeken and Neder-over-Heembeek and centred around the Place du Mutsaert/Mutsaertplaats or Mutsaardplein, it is separated from the rest of Laeken by the Royal Domain and is the site of the Museums of the Far East. The district also extends a little into the neighbouring Flemish municipalities of Vilvoorde and Grimbergen.

== Toponymy ==
The name Mutsaard comes from Dutch, meaning 'faggot'. In the 18th century, an inn called Den Groenen Mutsaard (lit. 'The Green Faggot') was built at the intersection of the municipalities of Laeken, Neder-Over-Heembeek, Strombeek and Vilvoorde, giving the area its name.

Before that, the area was known as Wannecouter, first mentioned in 1297. In Old Dutch, wan meant 'missing' or 'empty', while couter referred to 'cultivated arable land'. It remained in use well into the 19th century and still appears on cadastral maps today as a local place name.

== Sights ==
- The Museums of the Far East, which are dedicated to Oriental art and culture, specifically that of China and Japan, and form part of the Royal Museums of Art and History (RMAH). The museum complex consists of two main monuments: the Chinese Pavilion and the Japanese Tower. These buildings were designed by the architect Alexandre Marcel at the beginning of the 20th century on behalf of King Leopold II. They have been closed since 2013 because of structural weaknesses.
- The Fountain of Neptune (1902), located on the Avenue Van Praet/Van Praetlaan. This monument is an exact replica of the Fountain of Neptune by Giambologna dating from 1563 in Bologna, Italy. From 1965 onwards, it stopped flowing due to its state of disrepair. It was renovated in 2019, which allowed it to flow again.
- The Church of Christ the King, located on the Avenue Wannecouter/Wannekouterlaan, a modernist building completed in 1982.
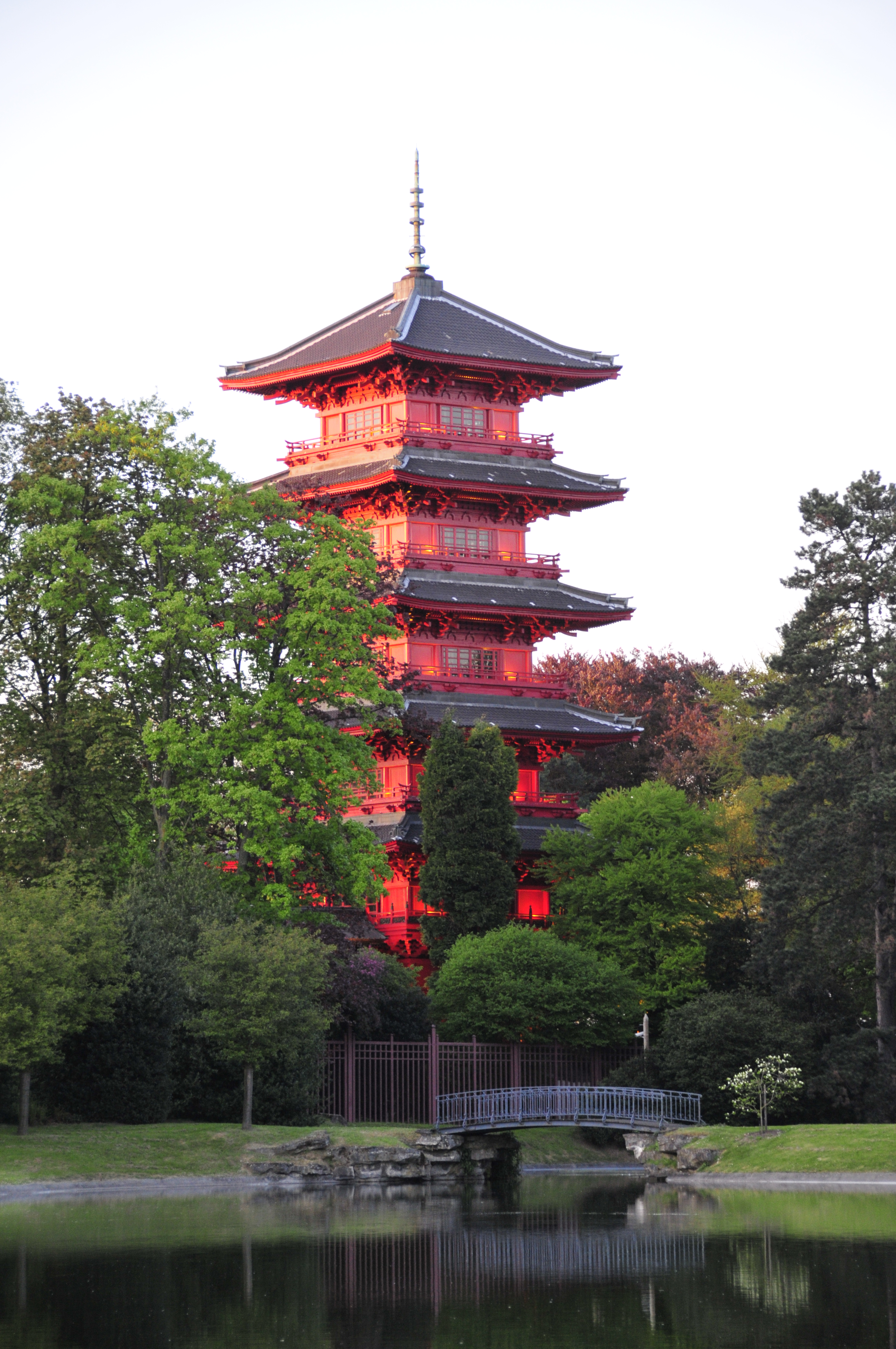
Japanese Tower

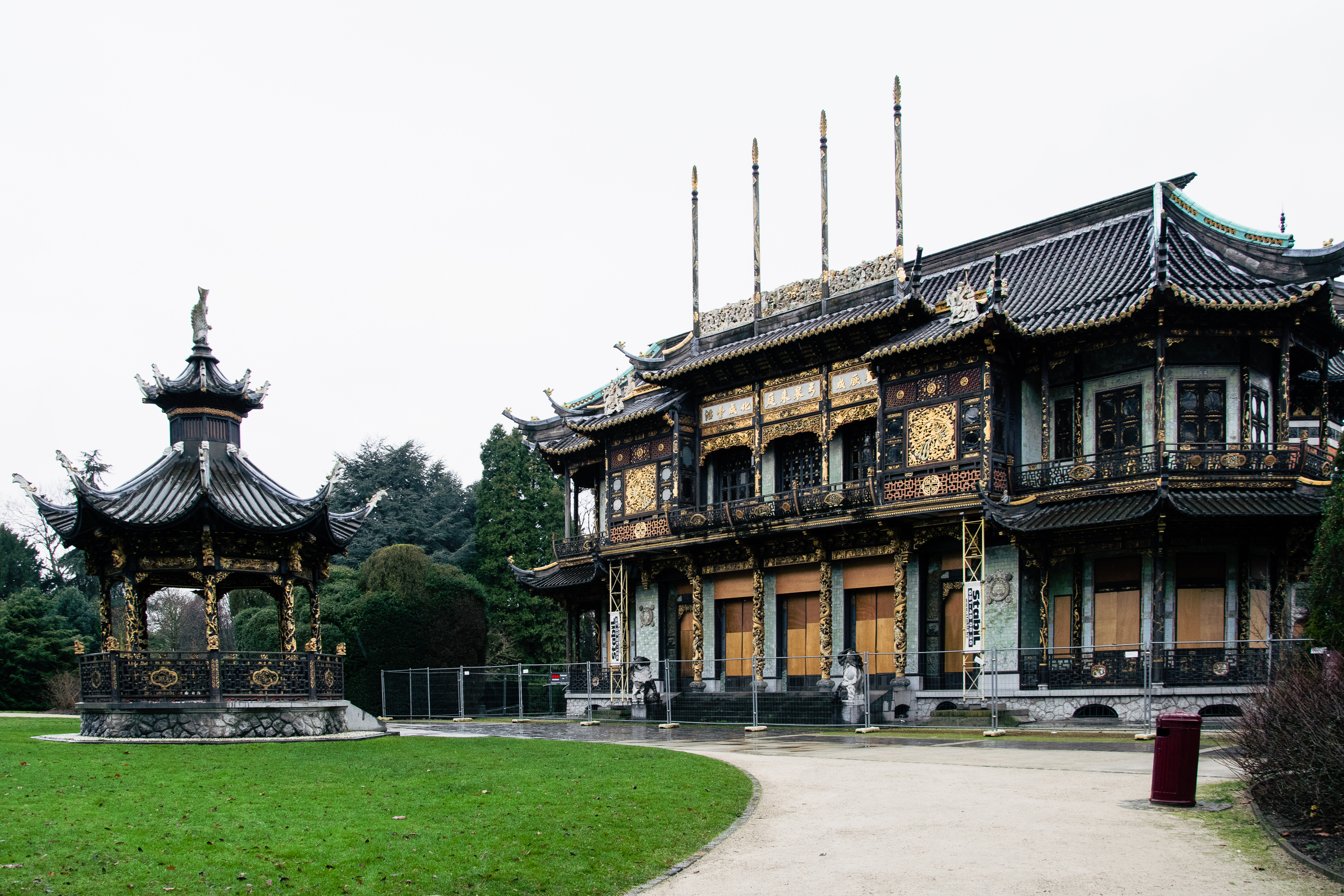
Chinese Pavilion

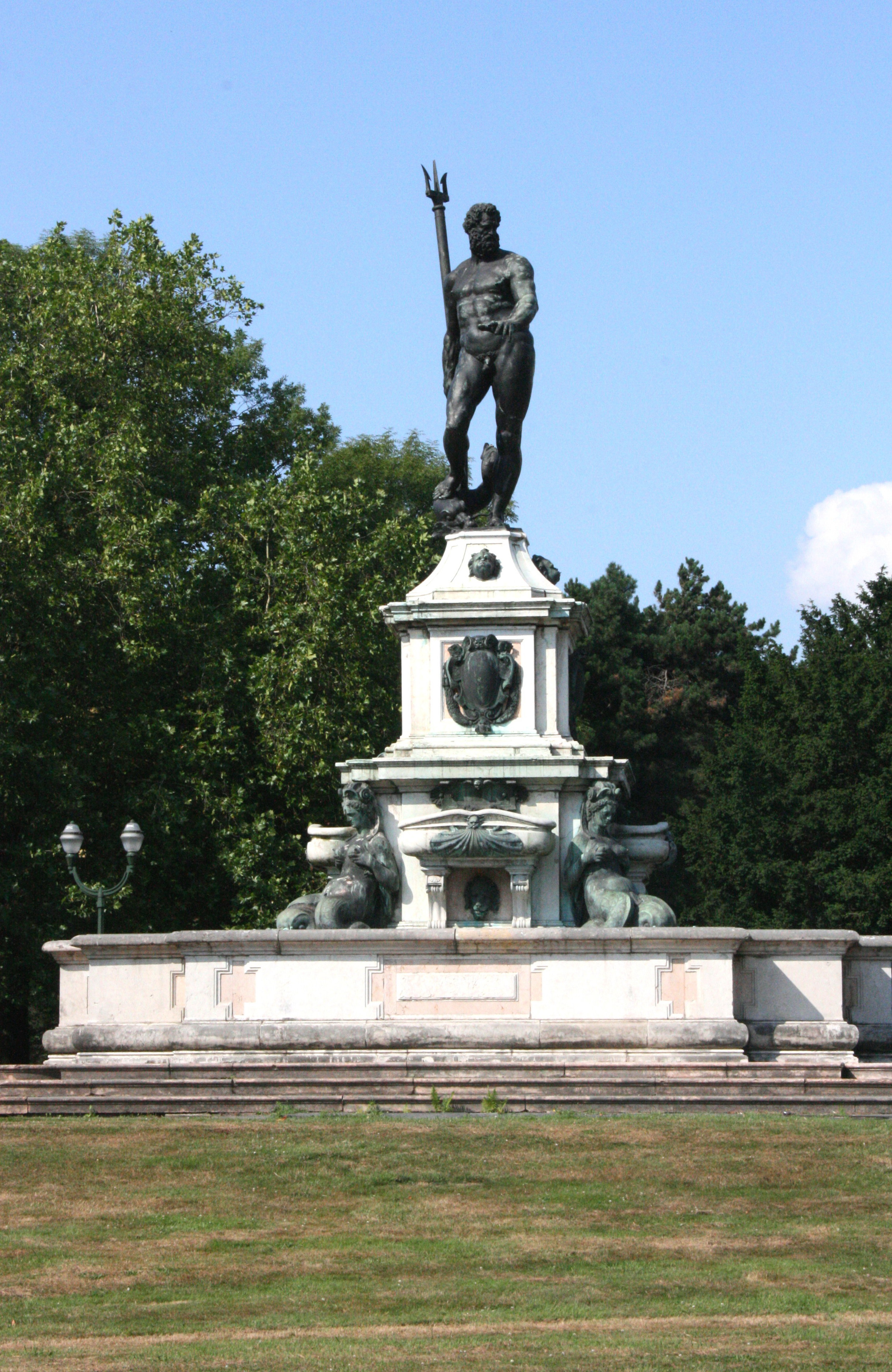
Fountain of Neptune

== See also ==
- Neighbourhoods in Brussels
- History of Brussels
- Belgium in the long nineteenth century
