= Strombeek-Bever =

- Town
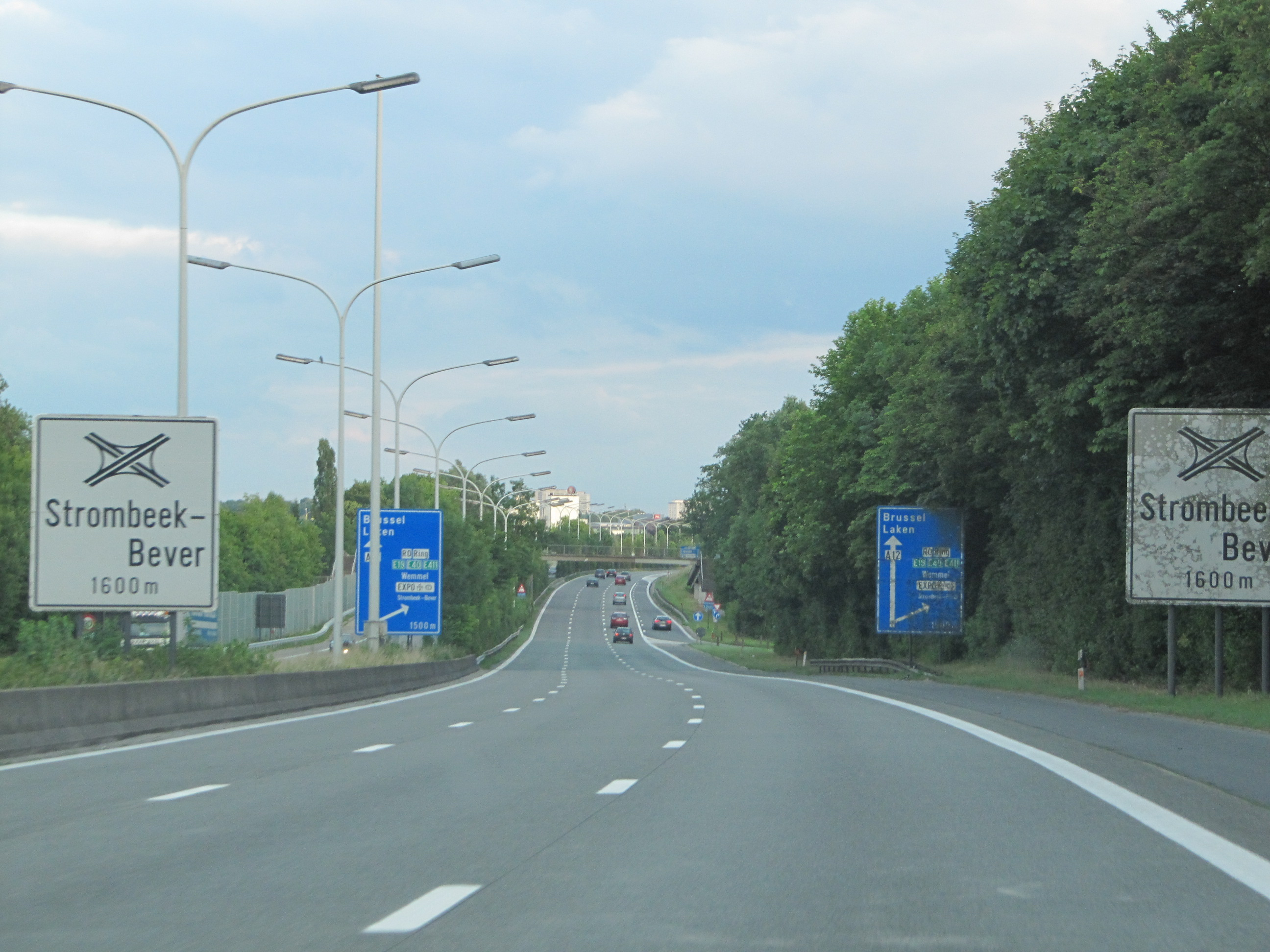

- Location in Belgium
- Coordinates: 50.91°N 4.35°E
- Country: Belgium
- Region: Flemish Region
- Province: Flemish Brabant

Population
  - Total: 11,500

Strombeek-Bever is a town with approximately 11,500 inhabitants in the municipality of Grimbergen, in the province of Flemish Brabant, Belgium. A suburb on the north side of Brussels, it is separated from Grimbergen proper by the R0 ring road around the city. It borders the Mutsaard neighbourhood of Laeken (within Brussels) to the south and the municipality of Vilvoorde to the east.

The official language of Strombeek-Bever is Dutch, as in the rest of Flanders. There is a substantial minority of French-speakers.
