= Museums of the Far East =

Museum in Brussels, Belgium

- Musées d'Extrême-Orient (French); Musea van het Verre Oosten (Dutch)
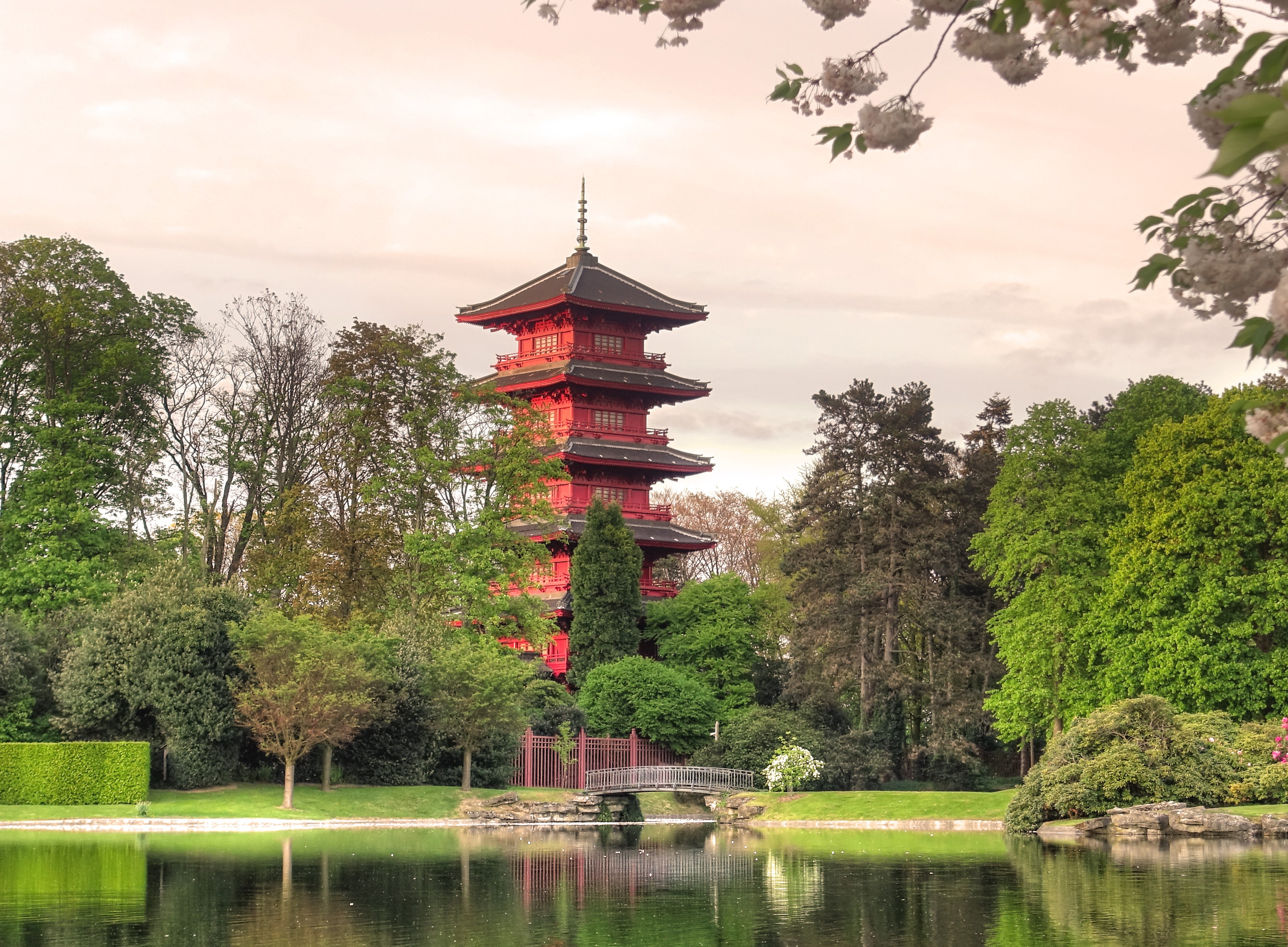
- Japanese Tower and garden of the Museums of the Far East, Brussels
- Interactive fullscreen map
- Location: Avenue Van Praet / Van Praetlaan 44, 1020 Laeken, City of Brussels, Brussels-Capital Region, Belgium
- Coordinates: 50°53′38″N 4°21′36″E
- Owner: Royal Museums of Art and History
- Public transit access: 6 Stuyvenbergh
- Website: www.kmkg-mrah.be/en/museums-far-east

The Museums of the Far East (French: Musées d'Extrême-Orient; Dutch: Musea van het Verre Oosten) is a complex of three museums in Laeken, in the north-west of the City of Brussels, Belgium. Consisting of the Chinese Pavilion, the Japanese Tower and the Museum of Japanese Art, it is dedicated to Oriental art and culture, specifically that of China and Japan, and forms part of the Royal Museums of Art and History (RMAH).

The buildings were designed by the architect Alexandre Marcel at the beginning of the 20th century on behalf of King Leopold II. The three museums have been closed since 2013 because of structural weaknesses. Some items from their collections are on public display at the Art & History Museum at the Parc du Cinquantenaire/Jubelpark of Brussels. The Chinese Pavilion and Japanese Tower were designated historic monuments in 2019.

The museum complex is situated in the Mutsaard district, near the Royal Palace of Laeken, the official residence of the King and Queen of the Belgians.

== History ==
The idea for an outdoor display of oriental buildings, open to the public on the site, originated with King Leopold II, who had been particularly impressed by the Panorama du Tour du Monde at the Paris Exposition of 1900. The French architect Alexandre Marcel was commissioned in 1900 to build a Japanese pagoda (known as a Tō). It was inaugurated in 1905. The Japanese Tower (French: Tour japonaise, Dutch: Japanse Toren) stands nearly 50 metres (160 ft) tall, across the road from the rest of the museum buildings.

Work on a larger Chinese Pavilion (French: Pavillon chinois, Dutch: Chinees Paviljoen) began in 1905. The building was originally intended to be a restaurant, but never served this purpose. In 1909, with the death of Leopold II, the original plan for a museum was abandoned and the building was donated to the Belgian state where it served as part of the Trade Museum of the Ministry of Foreign Affairs. From 1947 until 1989, the whole area was closed to visitors. The museums' section on Japanese art is housed in a building near the Chinese Pavilion, originally intended to serve as a stable and garage for the complex.

The Chinese Pavilion and Japanese Tower were recognised as protected monuments in 2019. After closing to the public in 2013 for structural reasons, the complex was restored but not reopened to the public. The Flemish public broadcaster VRT reported in 2022 that the Belgian government had decided the previous year not to re-open the complex although no formal announcement had been made to this effect.

== Exhibits ==
The Museums of the Far East collectively refer to three separate museums situated close to each other, which can be accessed on the same ticket. They are: the Chinese Pavilion, the Japanese Tower and the Museum of Japanese Art.

One of the principal focuses of the museums' collection, Chinese porcelain and other chinoiserie, is housed in the Chinese Pavilion. The Pavilion's displays focus on Chinese art originally designed for export to the West. It is situated in a Chinese garden.

The Japanese Tower, situated within a replica Japanese garden, displays Japanese art, mostly porcelain created for export to the West. The Museum of Japanese Art contains the bulk of the museums' collection of Japanese art and displays several suits of samurai armour, netsuke and decorative sword hilts, as well as woodblock prints and other artifacts. It is situated in the complex's carriage house and has only recently opened to the public.

Temporary exhibitions are also regularly held at the museum. Further examples of Asian art are also held by the RMAH at the Art & History Museum at the Parc du Cinquantenaire/Jubelpark in Brussels.

== Gallery ==
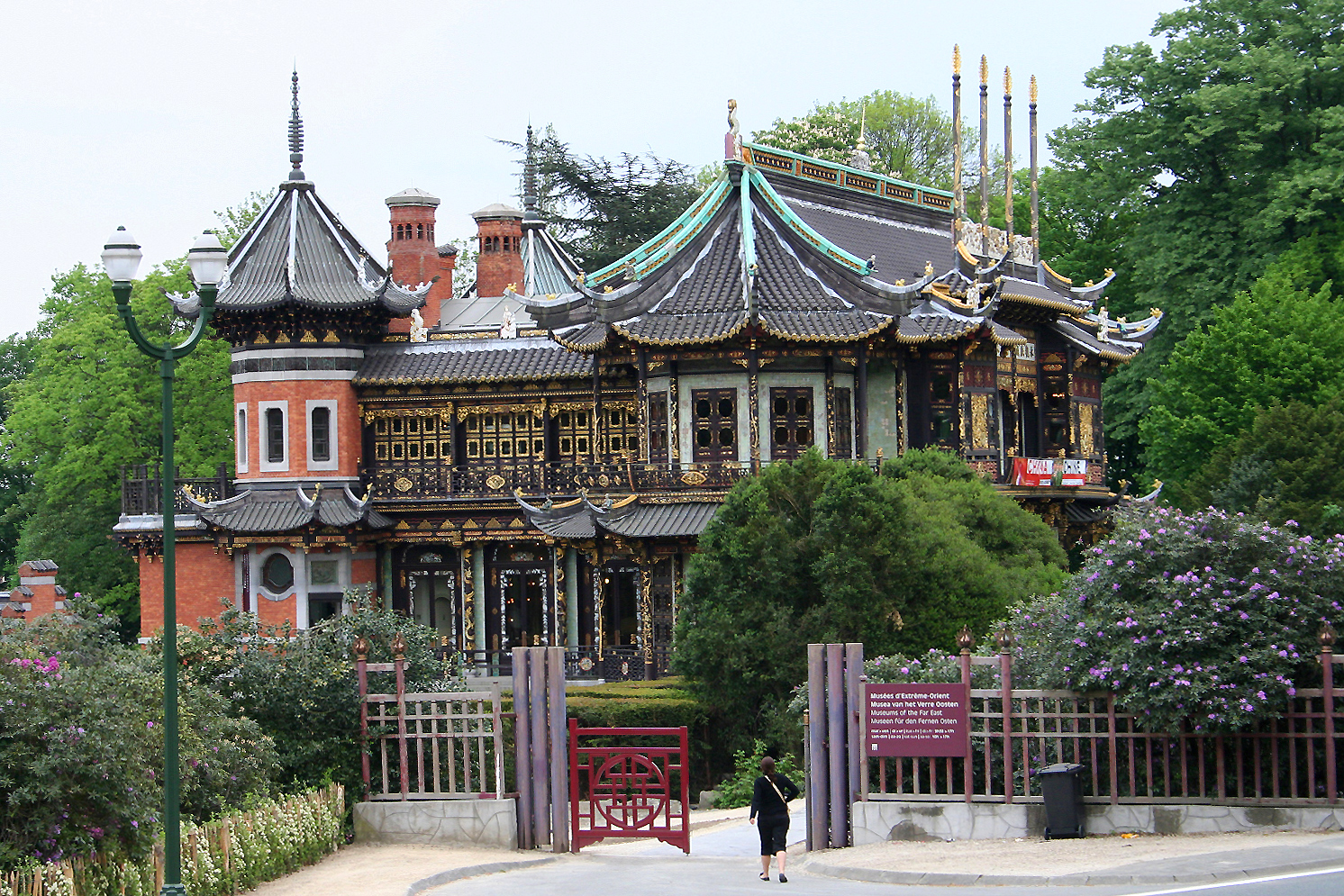
The museum's Chinese Pavilion, housing the porcelain and ceramics collection

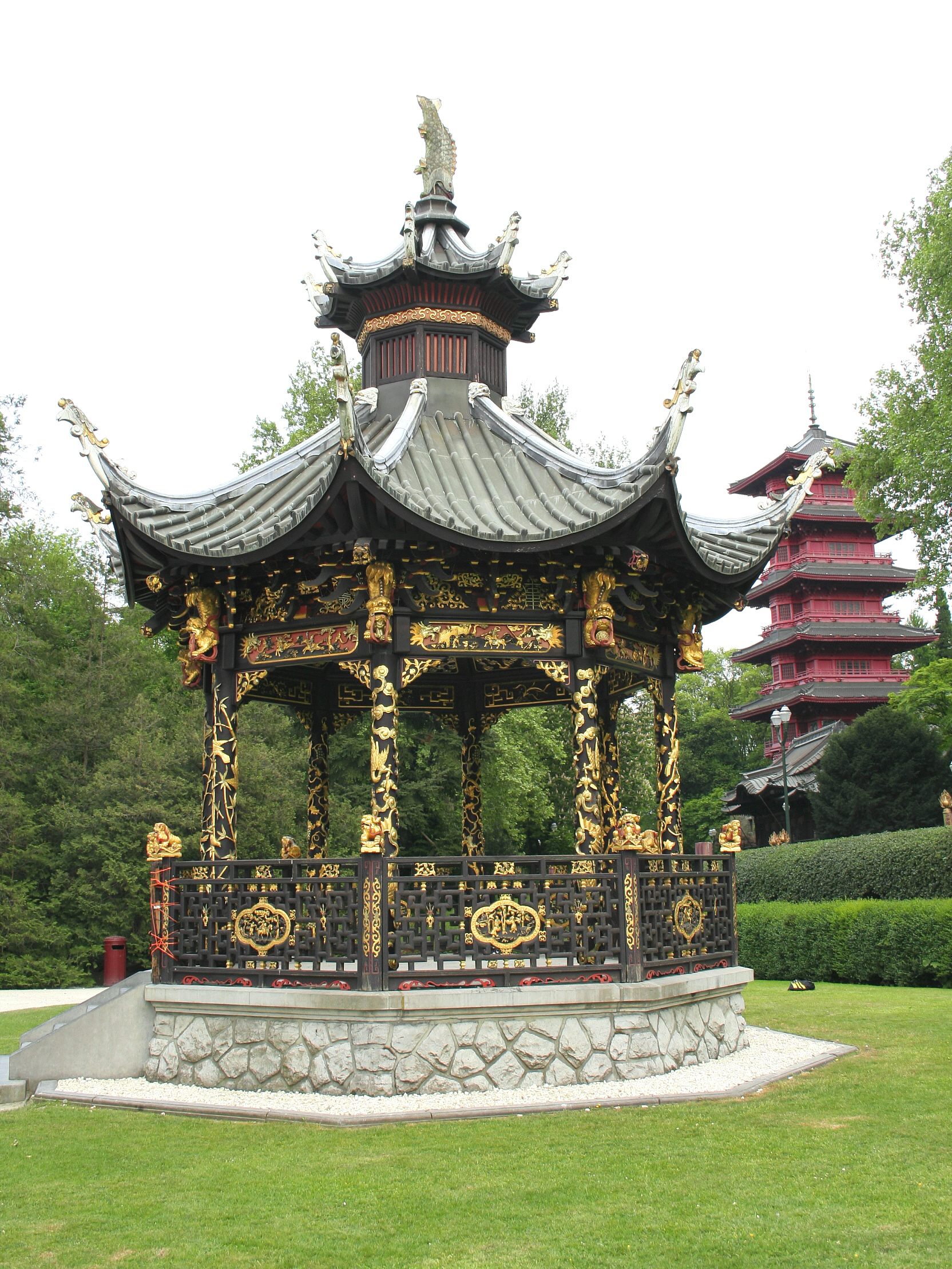
Chinese kiosk near the Chinese Pavilion

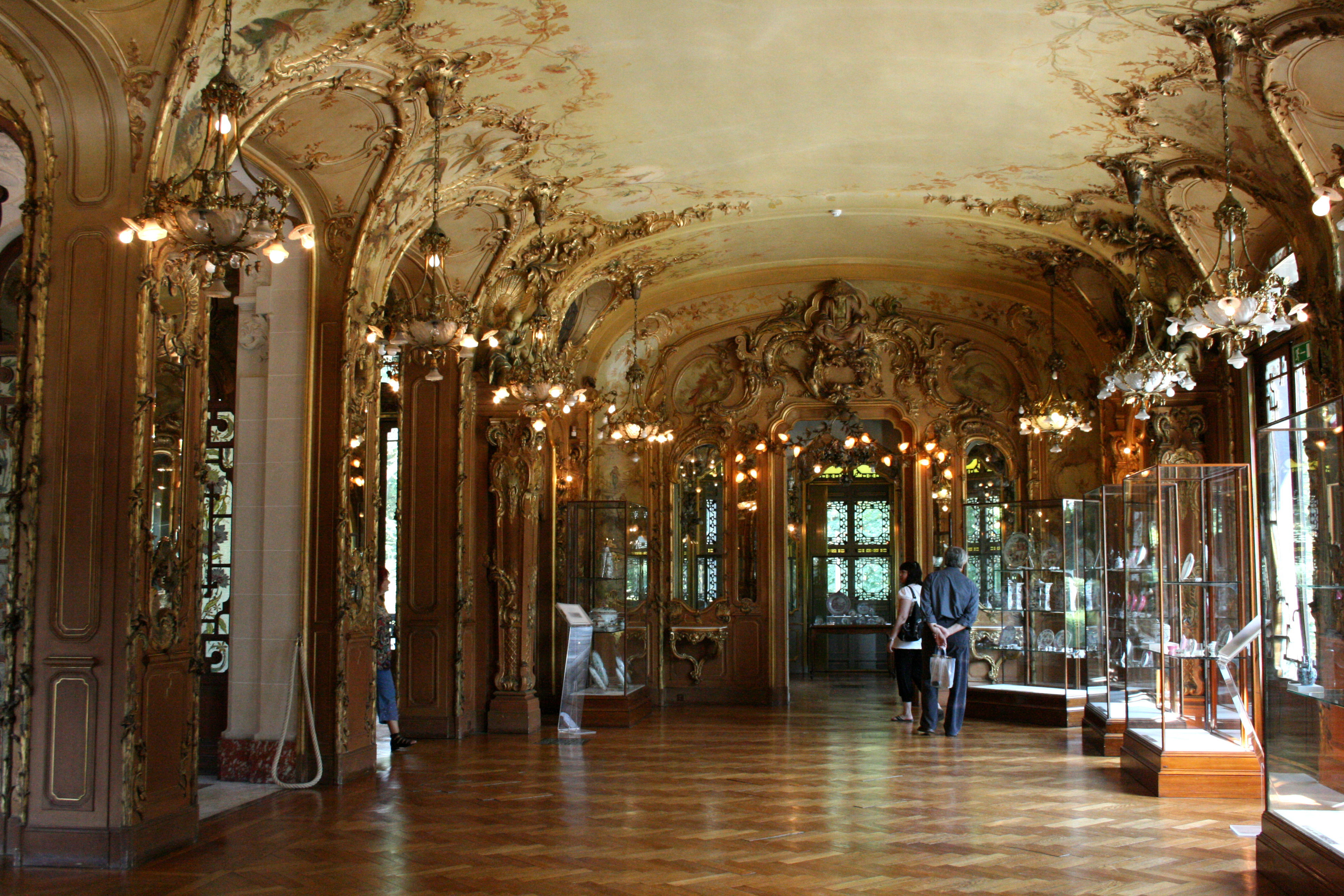
View of one of the principal rooms of the Chinese Pavilion

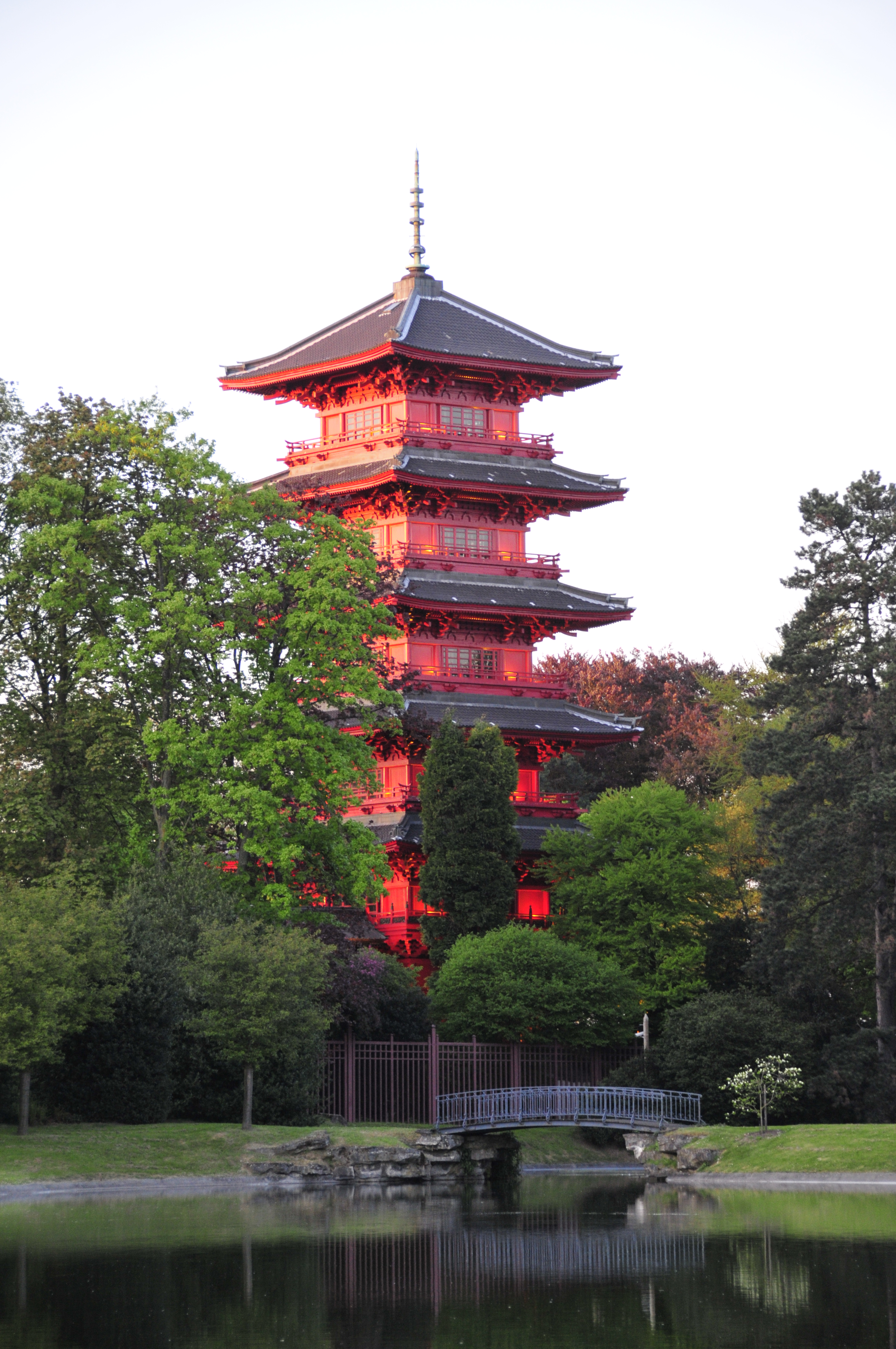
The Japanese Tower in the Royal Domain of Laeken

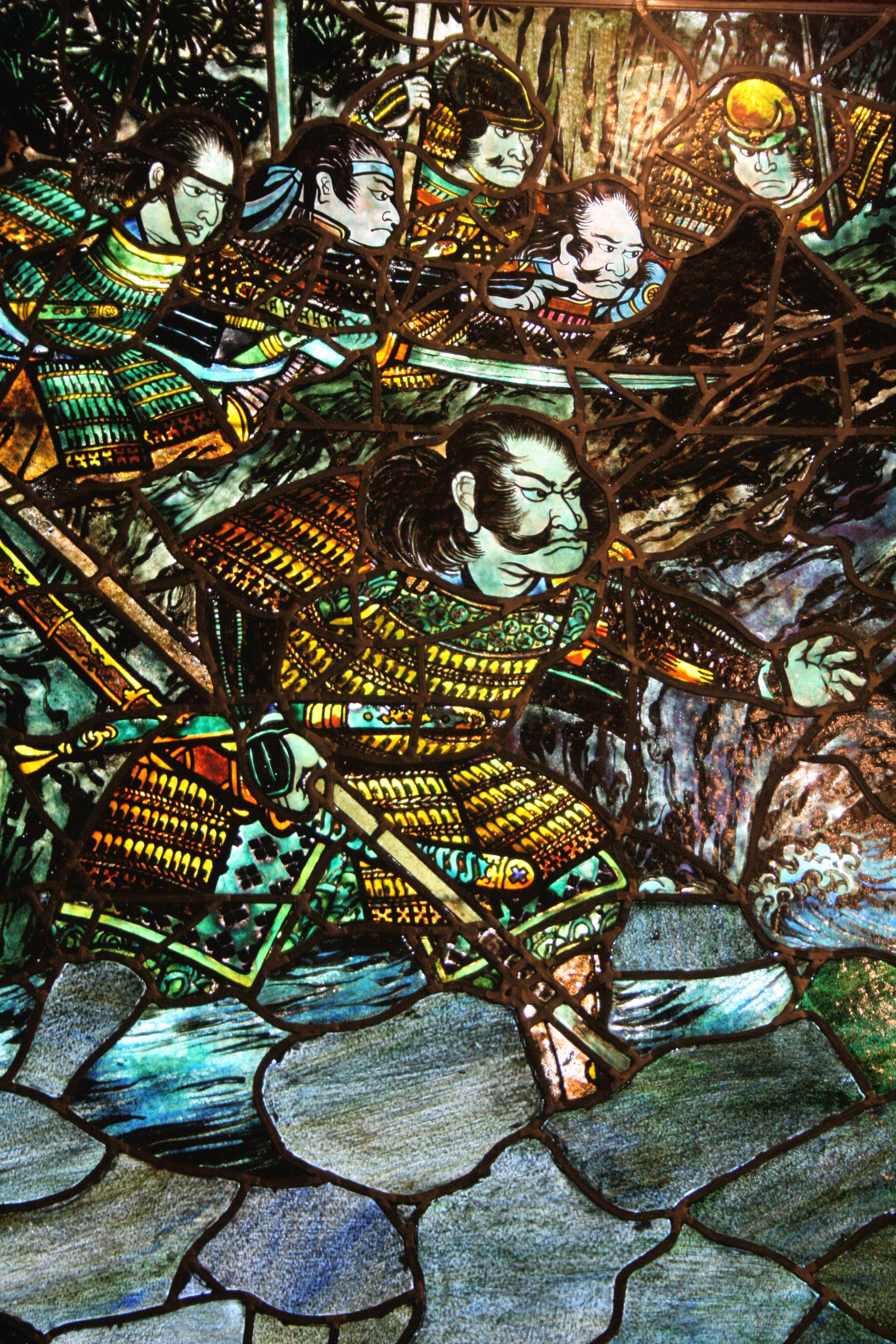
Japanese-inspired stained glass window depicting a Samurai, in the Japanese Tower

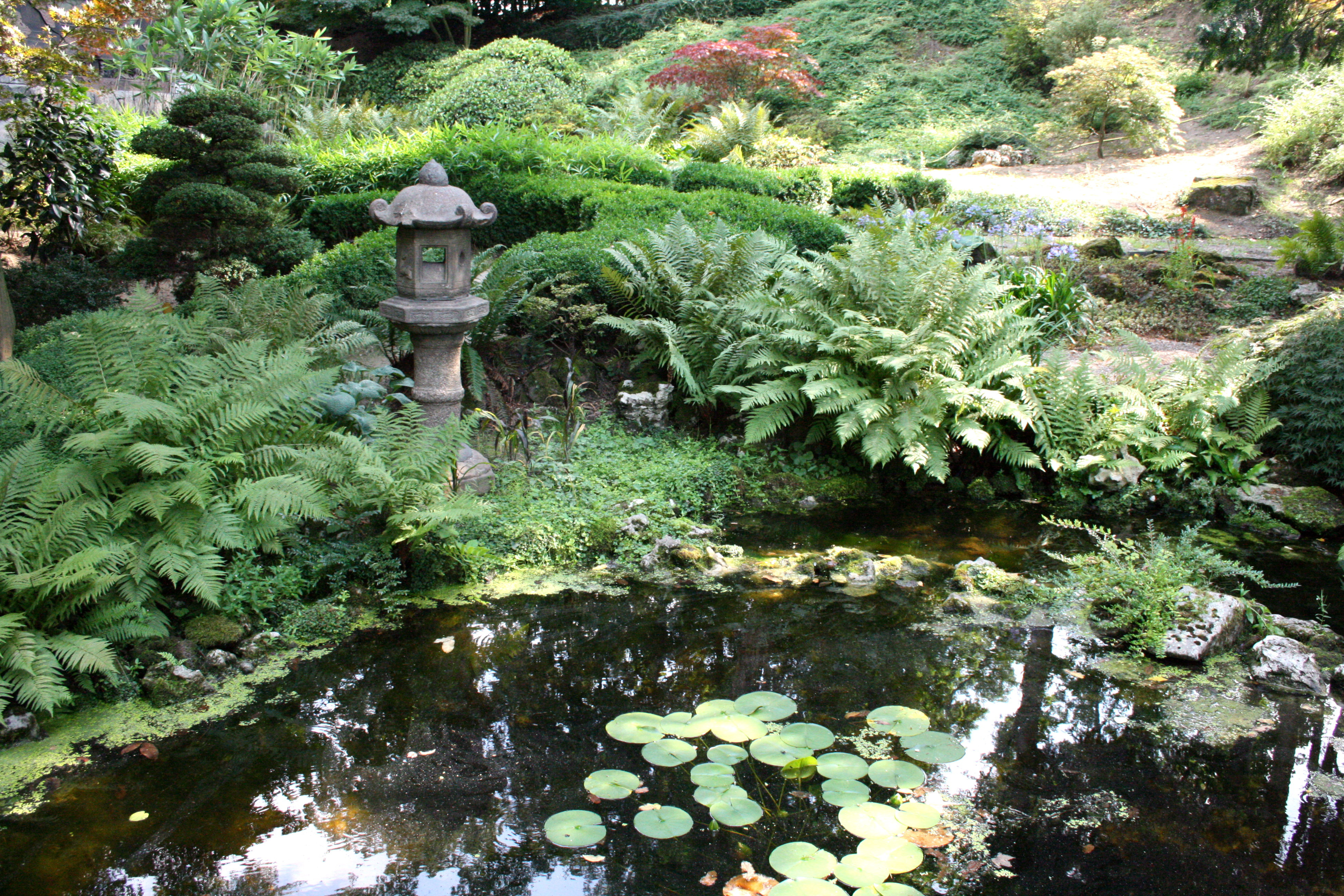
Part of the Japanese garden near the Japanese Tower

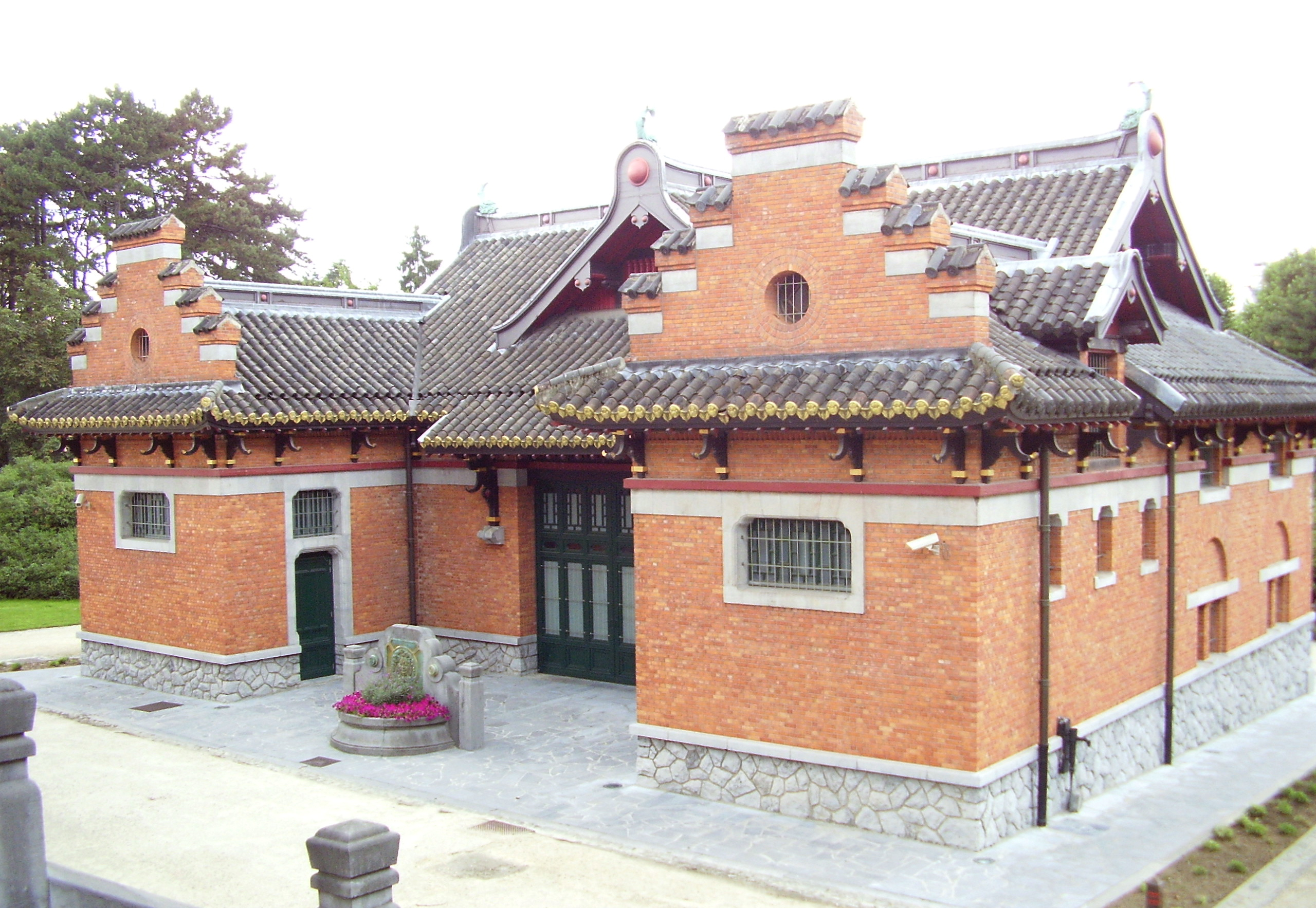
Out-building housing the collection of Japanese art, inaugurated in 2006

== See also ==
- Japanese Garden of Hasselt
- List of museums in Brussels
- History of Brussels
- Culture of Belgium
- Belgium in the long nineteenth century
