= Japanese Tower, Brussels =

Japanese pagoda in Laeken, Brussels, Belgium

Japanese Tower 塔
- Tour japonaise (French); Japanse Toren (Dutch)
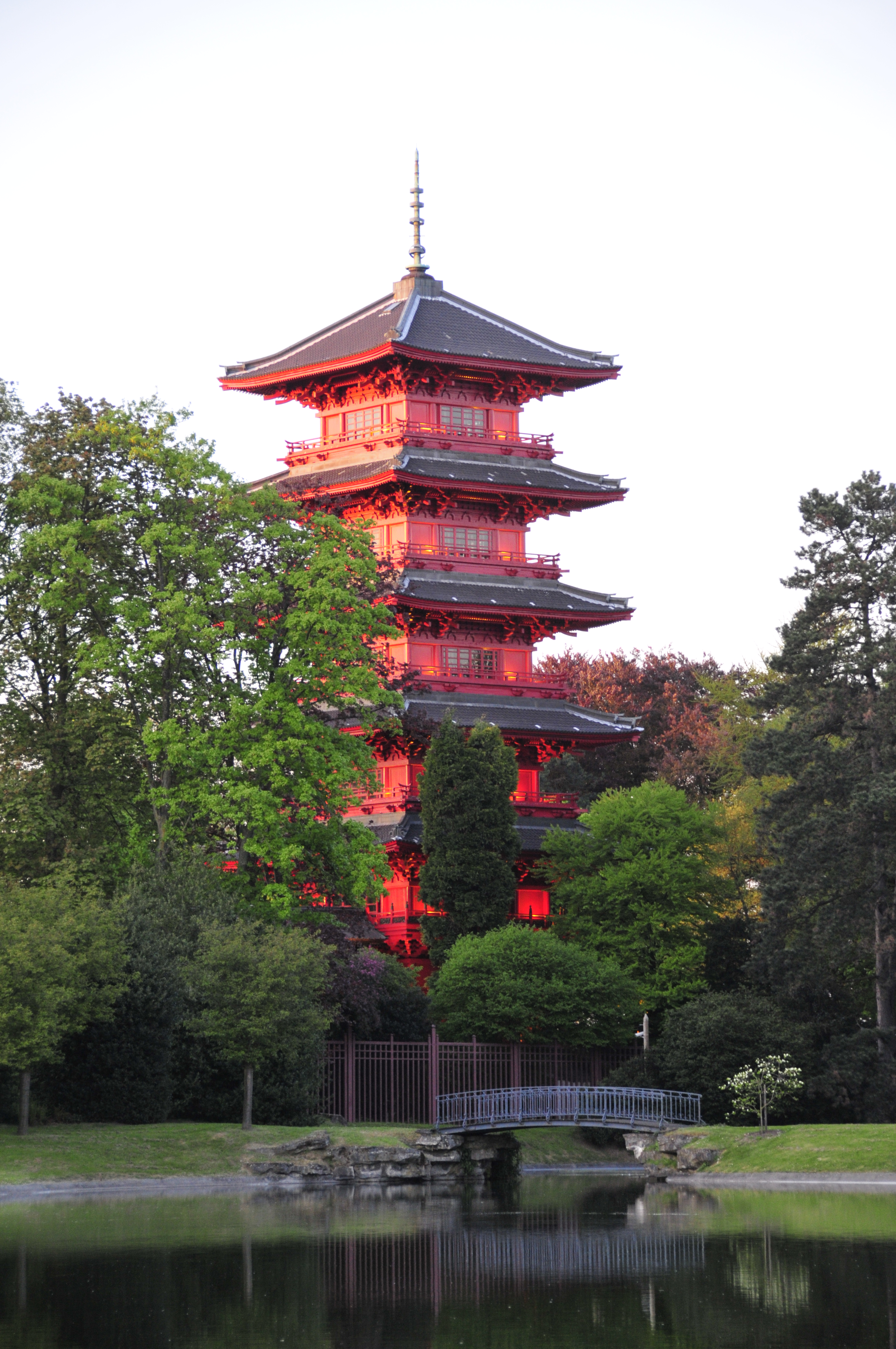
- View of the Japanese Tower in the Royal Domain of Laeken, Brussels

General information
- Type: Pagoda
- Architectural style: Japanese
- Location: Avenue Van Praet / Van Praetlaan 44, 1020 Laeken, City of Brussels, Brussels-Capital Region, Belgium
- Coordinates: 50°53′34″N 4°21′41″E
- Construction started: 1900
- Completed: 1904

Design and construction
- Designations: Protected (12/12/2019)

Other information
- Public transit: 6 Stuyvenbergh

The Japanese Tower (French: Tour japonaise; Dutch: Japanse Toren) is a Japanese pagoda in Laeken, in the north-west of the City of Brussels, Belgium. The five-storey tall pagoda measures nearly 50 metres (160 ft) in height, and is part of the Museums of the Far East three-museum complex. It was built by order of King Leopold II, between 1900 and 1904.

The tower has a combination of decoration and architecture that only a few places in Japan have, and is considered of "genuine historical interest in both Belgium and Japan". The tower was temporarily closed for renovation in 2013, and as of 2026, it is still closed to the public.

== History ==
=== Early history ===
The Japanese Tower, and the nearby Chinese Pavilion, were originally built by order of King Leopold II to store important Chinese and Japanese art collections. The king's idea for an outdoor display of oriental buildings, open to the public on the site, originated with his visit to the Panorama du Tour du Monde at the Paris Exposition of 1900, which he had been particularly impressed by, and whose entrance hall he acquired and reused for this tower. The French architect Alexandre Marcel was commissioned in 1900, and the timberwork was started in 1902. It was completed in 1904, and officially inaugurated on 6 May 1905, during the king's yearly garden party.

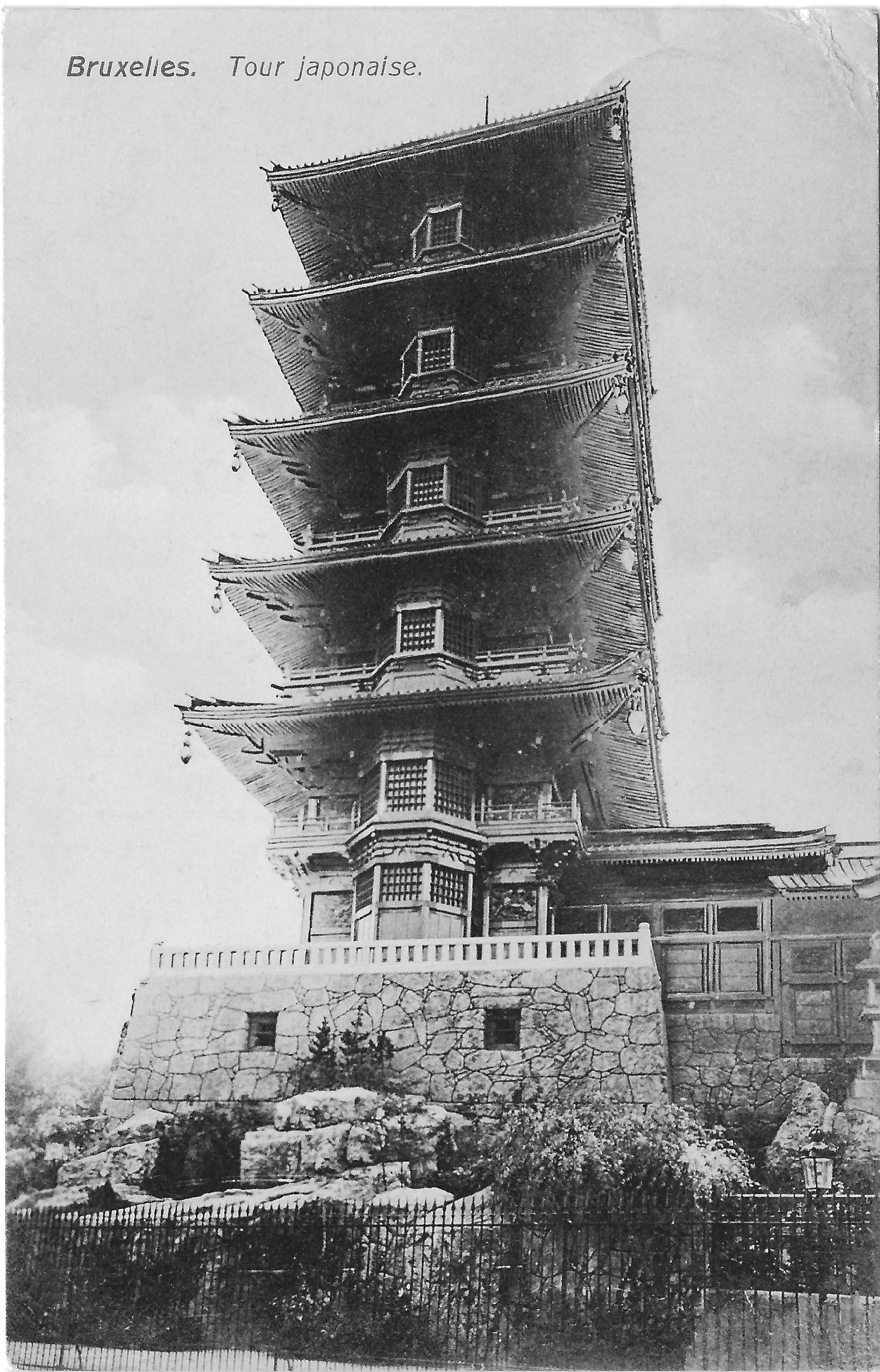
The newly-constructed Japanese Tower, c. 1909

The tower was scarcely used after it was built. In 1909, with the death of Leopold II, the original plan for a museum was abandoned and the building was donated to the Belgian state. Entrusted to the Ministry of Foreign Affairs, it was open to the public until the First World War. In 1921, it was assigned to the Ministry of Arts and Sciences. After that, it was closed to visitors for long periods of time: during the Second World War, and again from 1947 until 1989, when it was restored on the occasion of Europalia Japan.

=== Renovation and closure ===
After a study of the upper floors, requested and carried out by the Belgian building agency in 2010, an important ornamental scheme was discovered, partly made of Japanese lacquer. In 2011, to ensure that the building's problems were well addressed and it was acceptably restored, international experts were consulted. The visit of Professor William Coaldrake and Shigeru Kubodera (September 2012) confirmed the building's value and importance. They stated:

Only a few places in Japan have a similar combination of decoration and architecture. The interior includes elements from the late Edo and Meiji periods. The latter was the culmination of decorative arts in Japan. The tower reflects this in the sophistication of crafts and technologies employed to decorate its interior, as the apparent extensive use of ikkei saishiki for the doors, pillars and panels will suffice to illustrate.

The Japanese Tower and the Chinese Pavilion have been closed since 2013 because of structural weaknesses. Some items from their collections are on public display at the Art & History Museum at the Parc du Cinquantenaire/Jubelpark of Brussels. The buildings were recognised as protected monuments in 2019, and renovation should have finished in 2021. However, the Flemish public broadcaster VRT reported in 2022 that the Federal government had decided the previous year not to re-open the complex although no formal announcement had been made to this effect.

== Description ==
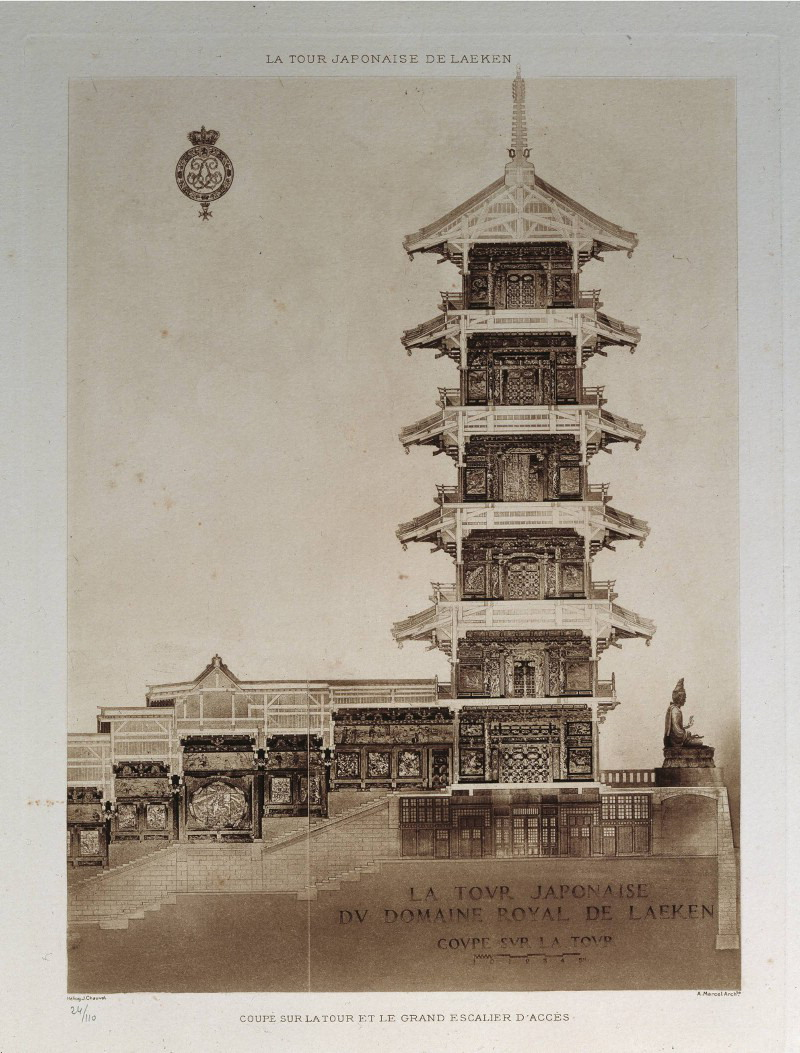
Cross-section of the Japanese Tower by Alexandre Marcel (1900), Archives of the Royal Palace, Brussels

The tower, a Japanese pagoda (known as a Tō), is part of the Museums of the Far East, a complex of three museums in Laeken, northern Brussels. The red-painted building has five storeys, stands 50 metres (160 ft) tall, and is located across the road from the rest of the museum buildings. It combines reused elements manufactured in Japan with the construction of Marcel. Though Belgian craftsmen built the main part of the tower, they initially opted not to use nails, in the traditional Japanese style. Marcel however was not convinced, and ordered to add nails, as well as wooden braces. Marcel, inspired by the Shrines and Temples of Nikkō, mixed Japanese and European techniques for the interiors. The art dealer Maison Reynaud from Yokohama provided most of the internal and external decorations.

=== Interior ===
The tower has rich interiors, being richly decorated with chased copper panels, stucco, and elaborated stained glass windows. It has six chambers, connected by a stairwell. The latter is decorated with kinkarakawa-gami panels. These are surrounded by "aventurine" or "bronzine", a European imitation of the Japanese nashiji technique.

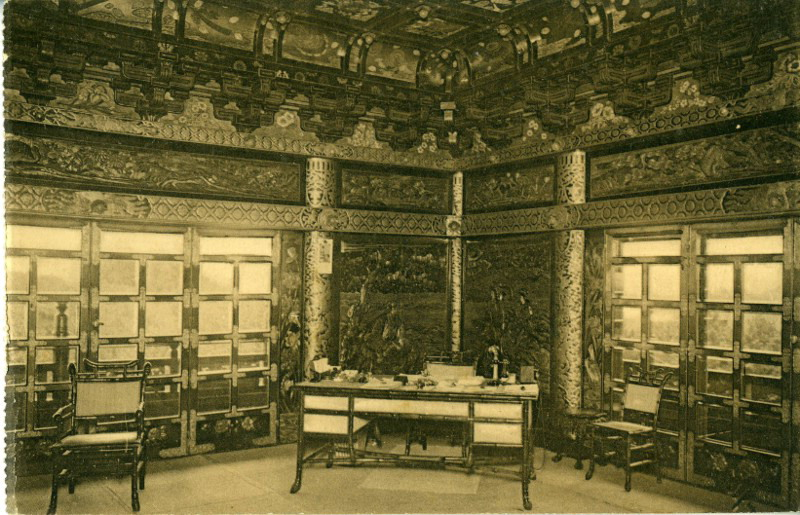
The king's office on the first floor at the beginning of the 20th century

The first floor features a polychrome decoration with a legend of Urashima Taro, plus a coffered ceiling with a depiction of Japanese musicians. The second floor, known as the "Green Floor", or "Golden Floor", has aventurine applied to wide lacquered wall panels. It has a depiction of mythical figures, including dragons. It originally included a ceiling with a painted vellum canopy depicting a group of women over a landscape, probably inspired by woodblock print by Utagawa Kunisada. This artifact was removed and is today stored at Brussels' Art & History Museum. The third floor, which has the most nashiji decorations, features a "magnificent ceiling similar to the first floor soffit but evoking animals, including openwork reliefs representing rising and diving dragons." The fourth floor, known as the "Red Floor", features red lacquered wooden panels, to which it owes its nickname, and a large matt Japanese painting on wood. The ceiling has a large marouflaged painting on canvas by the French decorator Willemsen, which was inspired by a painting in the Nikko temple as well as woodblock prints by Utagawa Hiroshige. The fifth floor features iconography that focuses on animals, like the second floor, including lions and monkeys. The fifth floor's ceiling was decorated by European artists with marouflaged Art Nouveau canvas paintings. This floor offers a panoramic view. Other decorative components were imported from Japan in 1904.

== Gallery ==
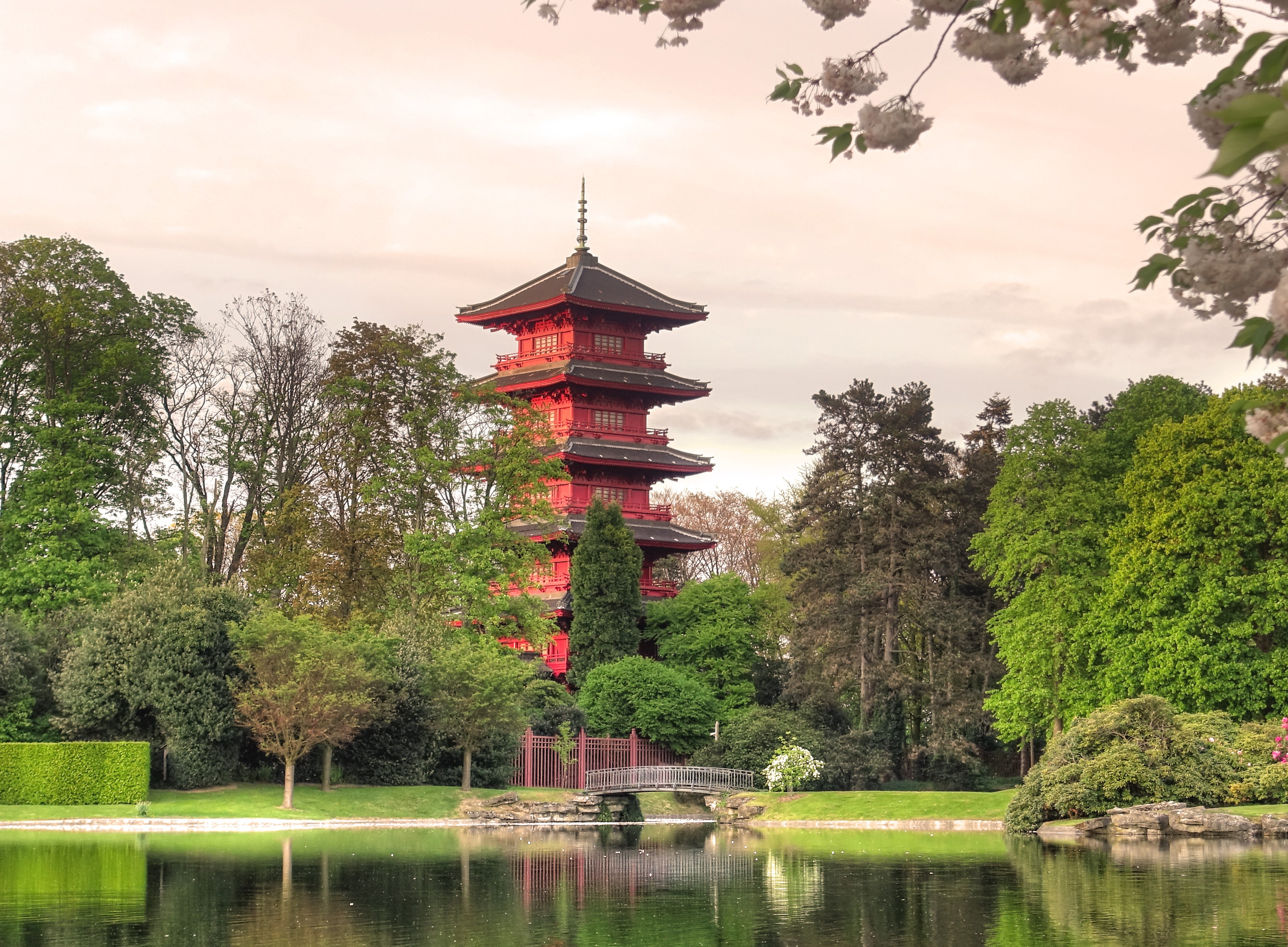
View of the Japanese Tower from the Japanese garden

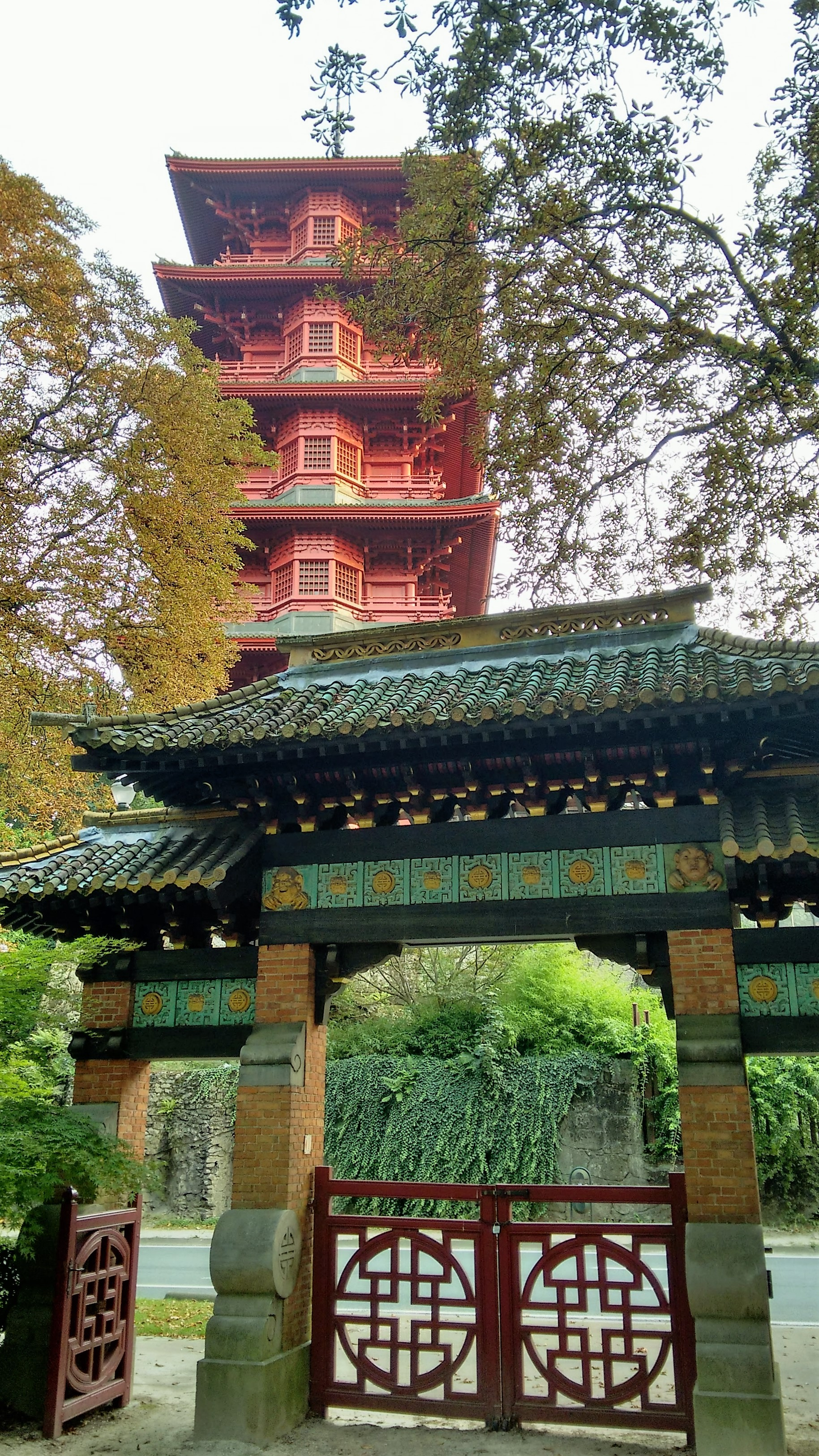
External gate with tower in the background

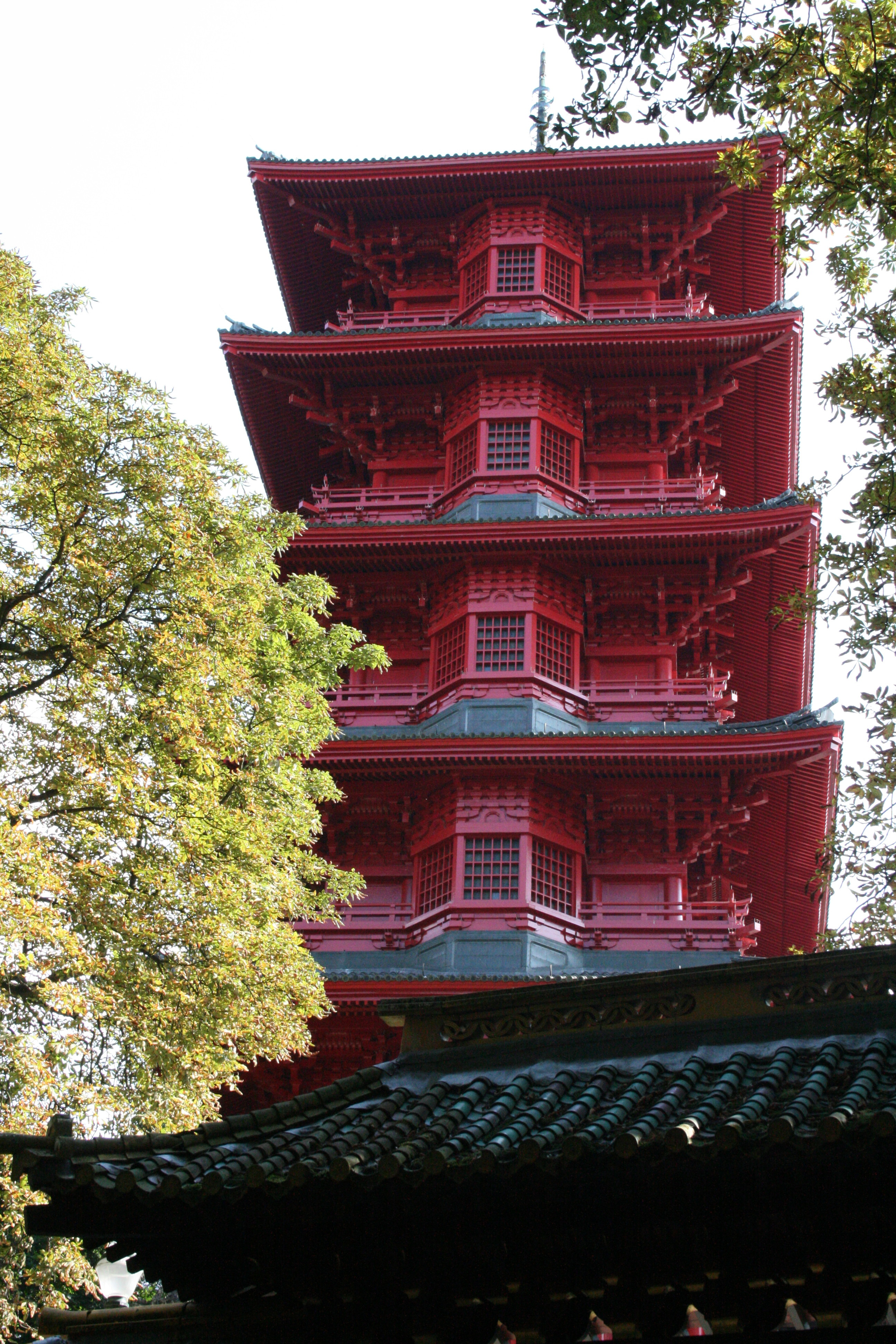
Façade of the tower

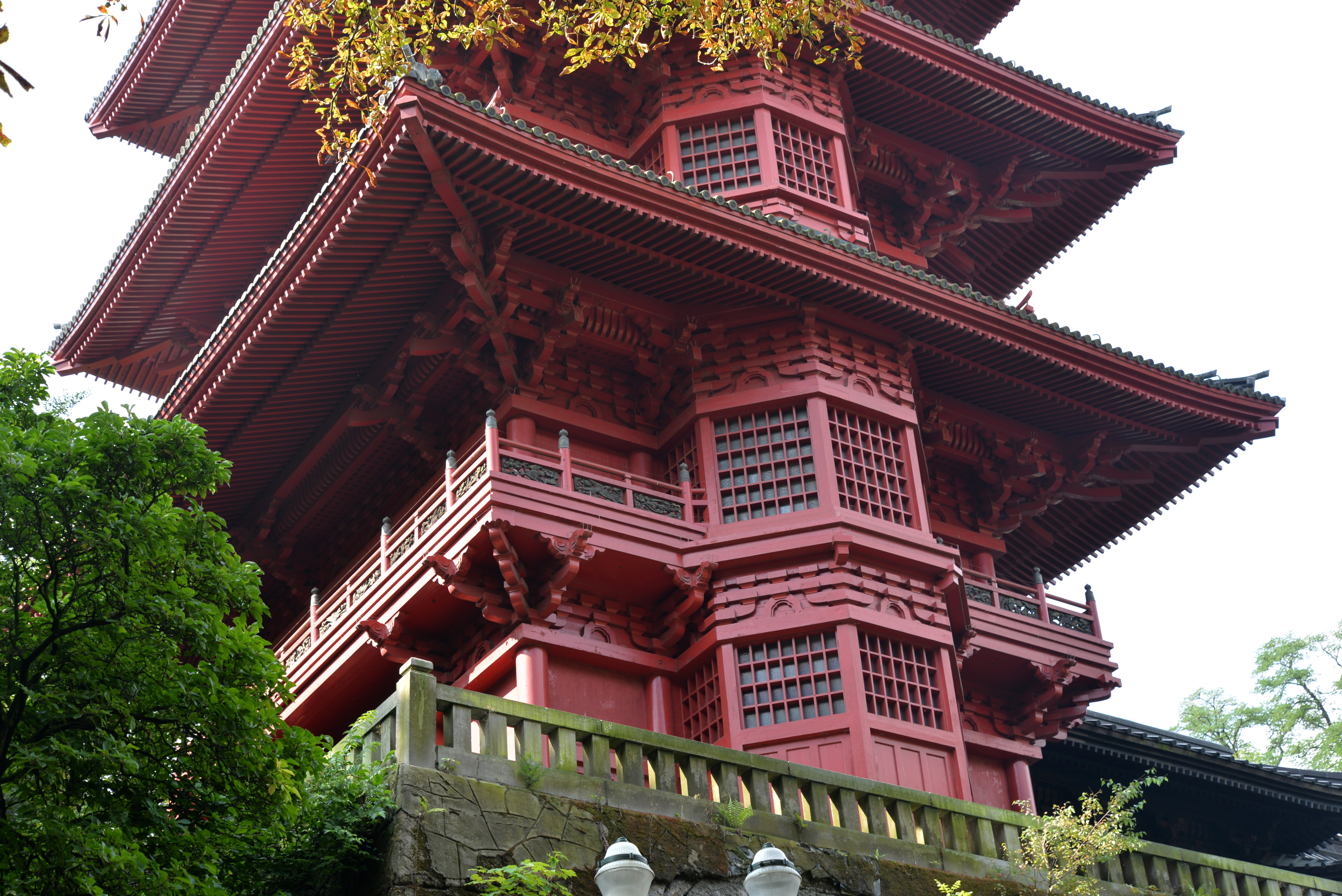
Close-up of the façade

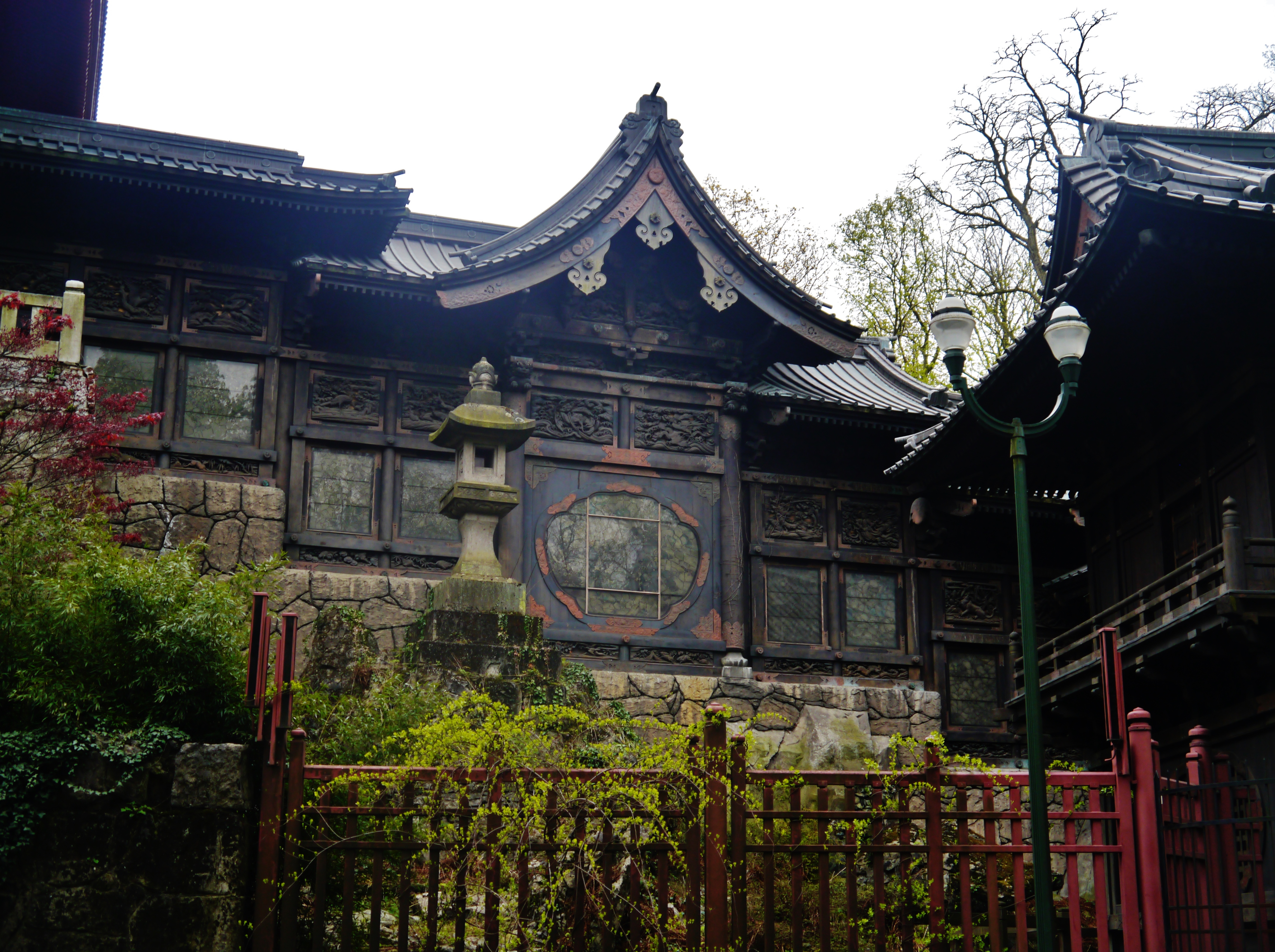
External structure

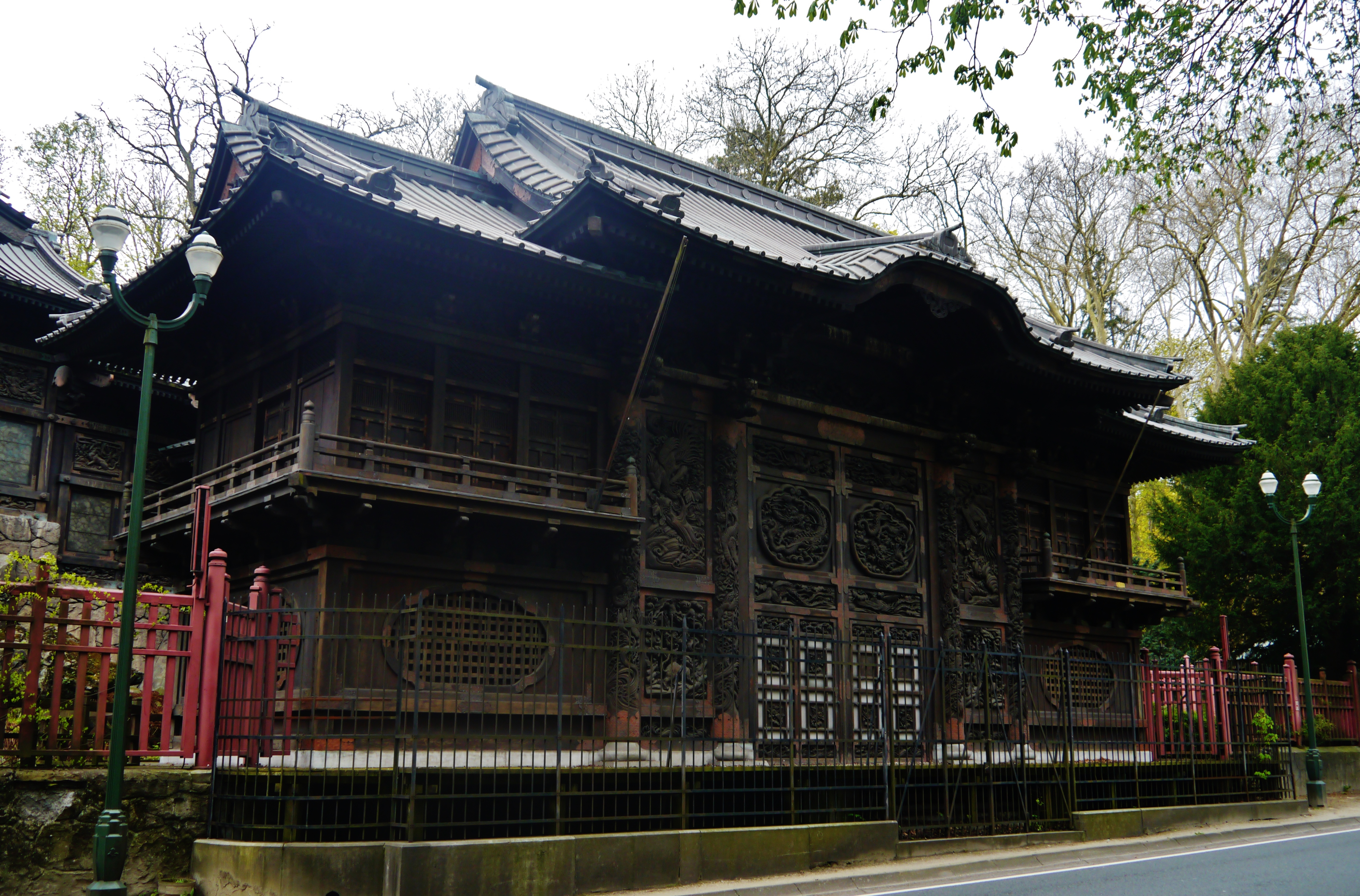
External structure

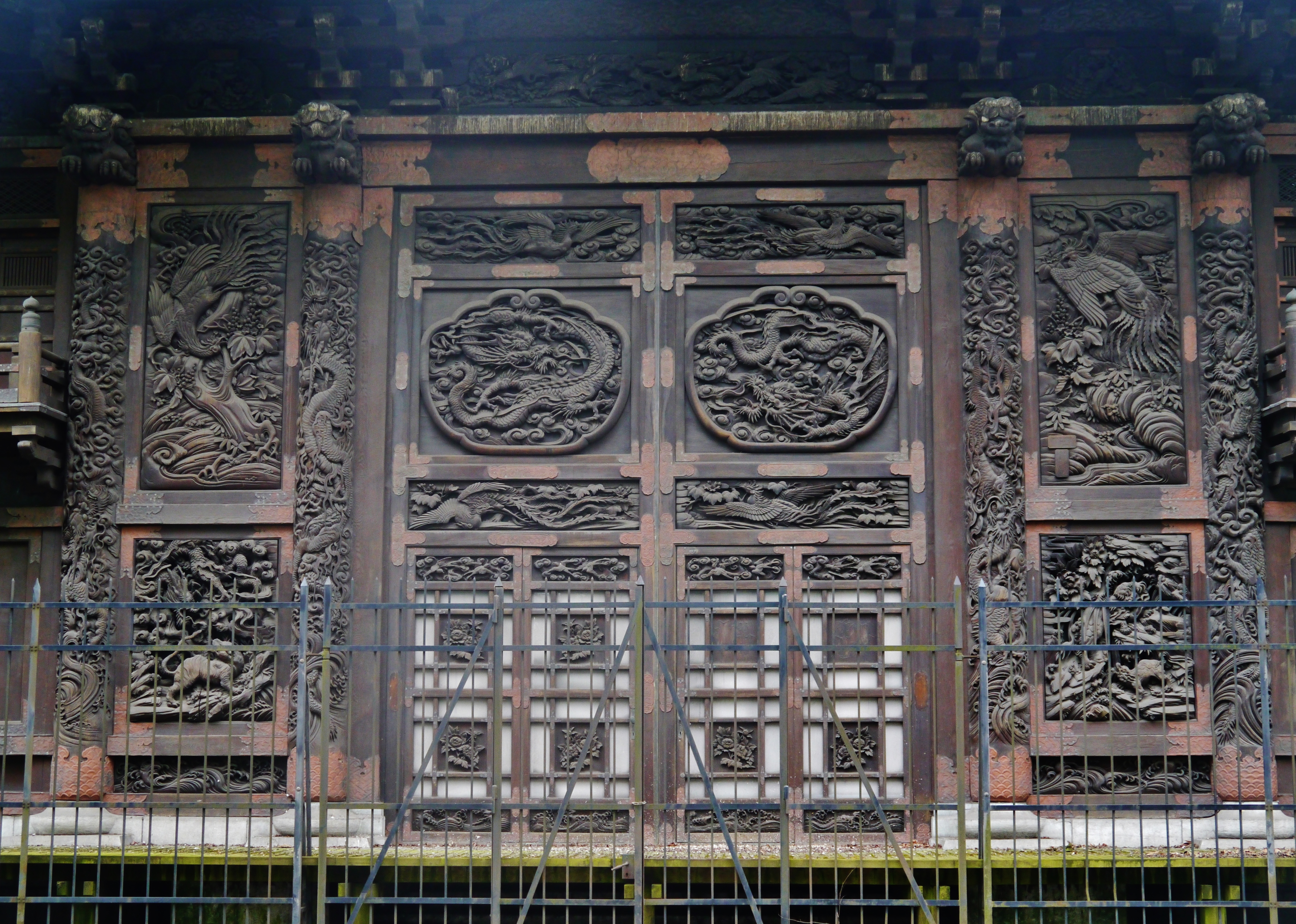
Close-up of external structure's door

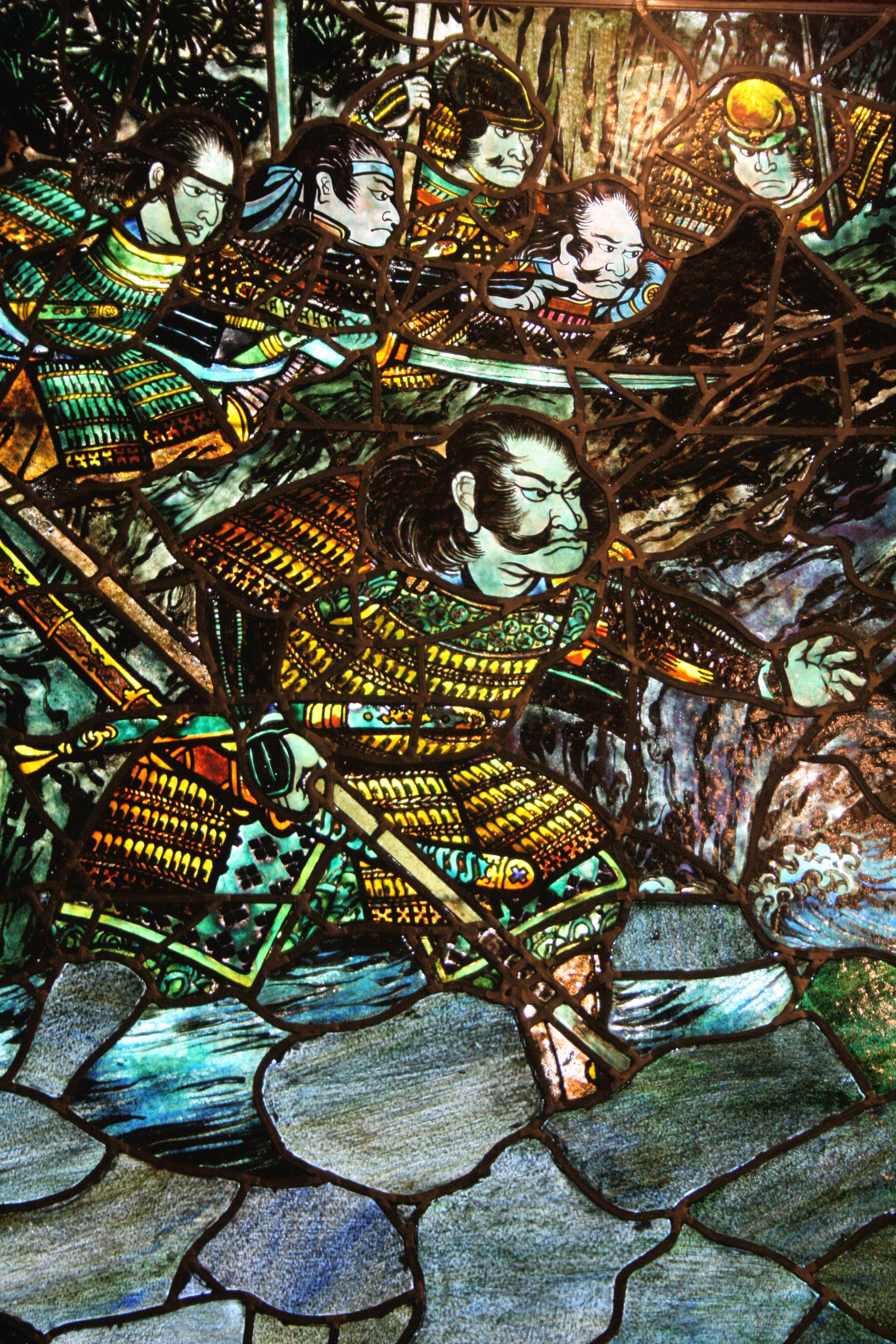
Japanese-inspired stained glass window depicting a samurai

== See also ==
- Japanese Garden of Hasselt
- List of museums in Brussels
- History of Brussels
- Culture of Belgium
- Belgium in the long nineteenth century
