= Laeken =

Neighbourhood in Brussels, Belgium

Laeken: Laeken (French); Laken (Dutch)
- Neighbourhood
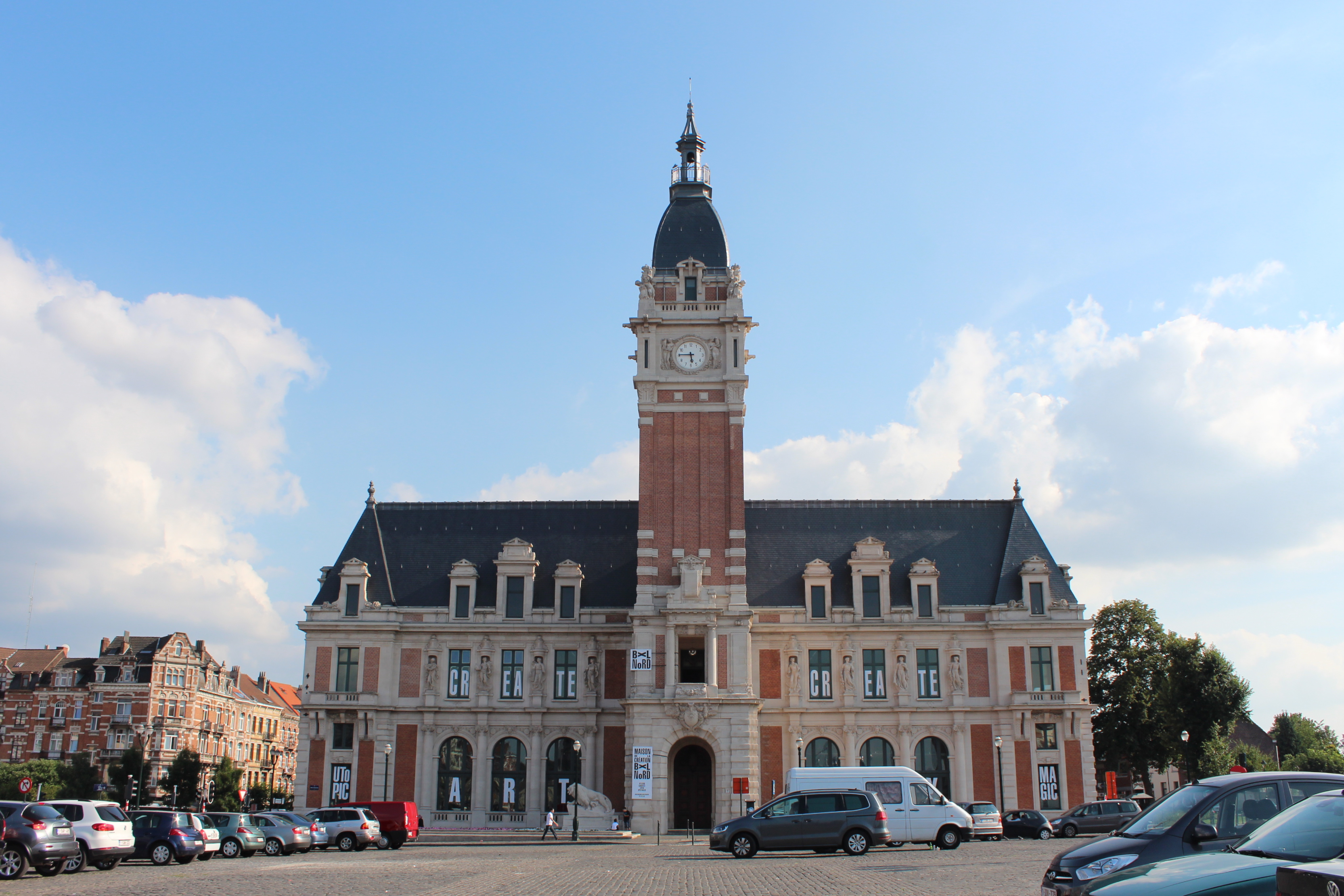
- Former Municipal Hall of Laeken

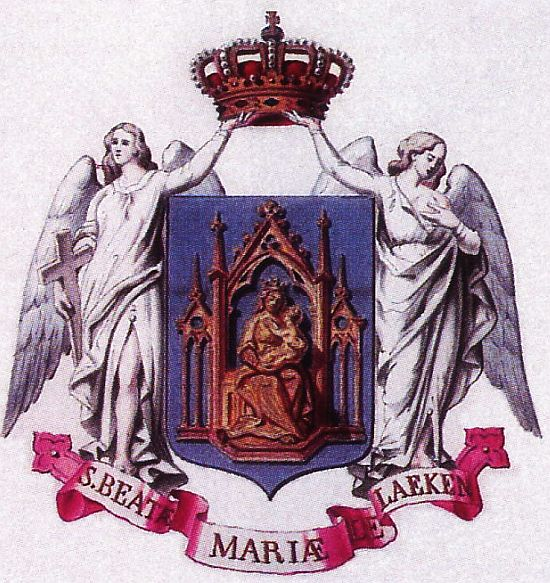
- Flag Coat of arms

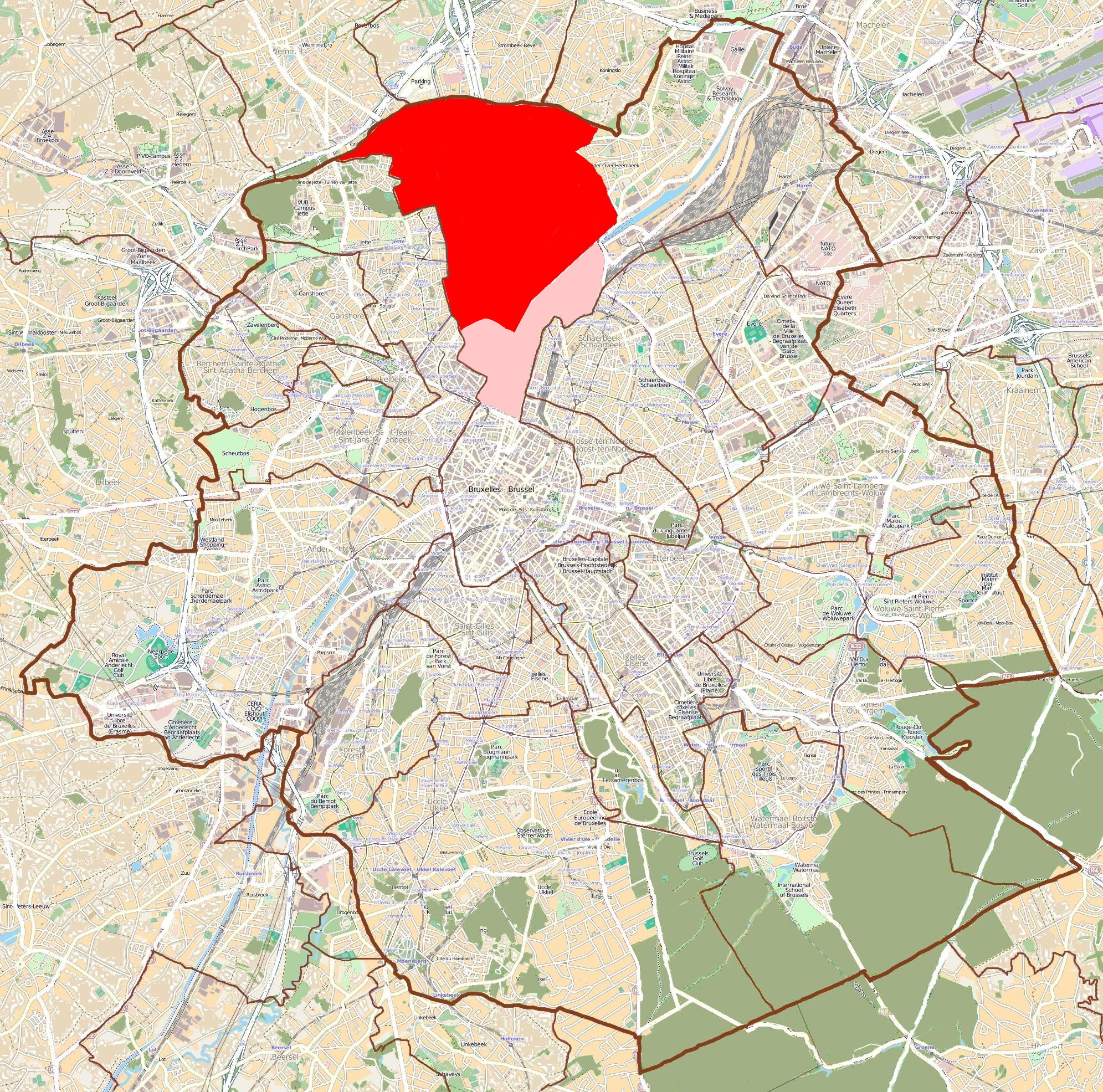
- Location within Belgium

- Location within Belgium
- Coordinates: 50°52′40″N 4°21′21″E
- Country: Belgium
- Region: Brussels-Capital Region
- Arrondissement: Brussels-Capital
- Municipality: City of Brussels

Area
  - Total: 9.25 km^{2} (3.57 sq mi)

Population (2015)
  - Total: 60,295
- Time zone: UTC+1 (CET)
  - Summer (DST): UTC+2 (CEST)
- Postal code: 1000, 1020, 1030
- Area codes: 02
- Website: Official website

Laeken (French, pronounced [lakœn]) or Laken (Dutch, pronounced [ˈlaːkə(n)]) is a residential suburb in the north-western part of the Brussels-Capital Region, Belgium. It belongs to the municipality of the City of Brussels and is mostly identified by the Belgian postal code: 1020. Prior to 1921, it was a separate municipality.

== Toponymy ==
The name Laeken (Dutch: Laken) derives from the Germanic Lacha or Lache ("water", "lake"), because the Molenbeek brook at the time formed a network of ponds at this height. The oldest mention of the village is in a diploma from 1080, where the name Gilbert de Lacha appears. There is also the mention Lachus in 1117.

== Main sights ==
=== Royal Palace ===
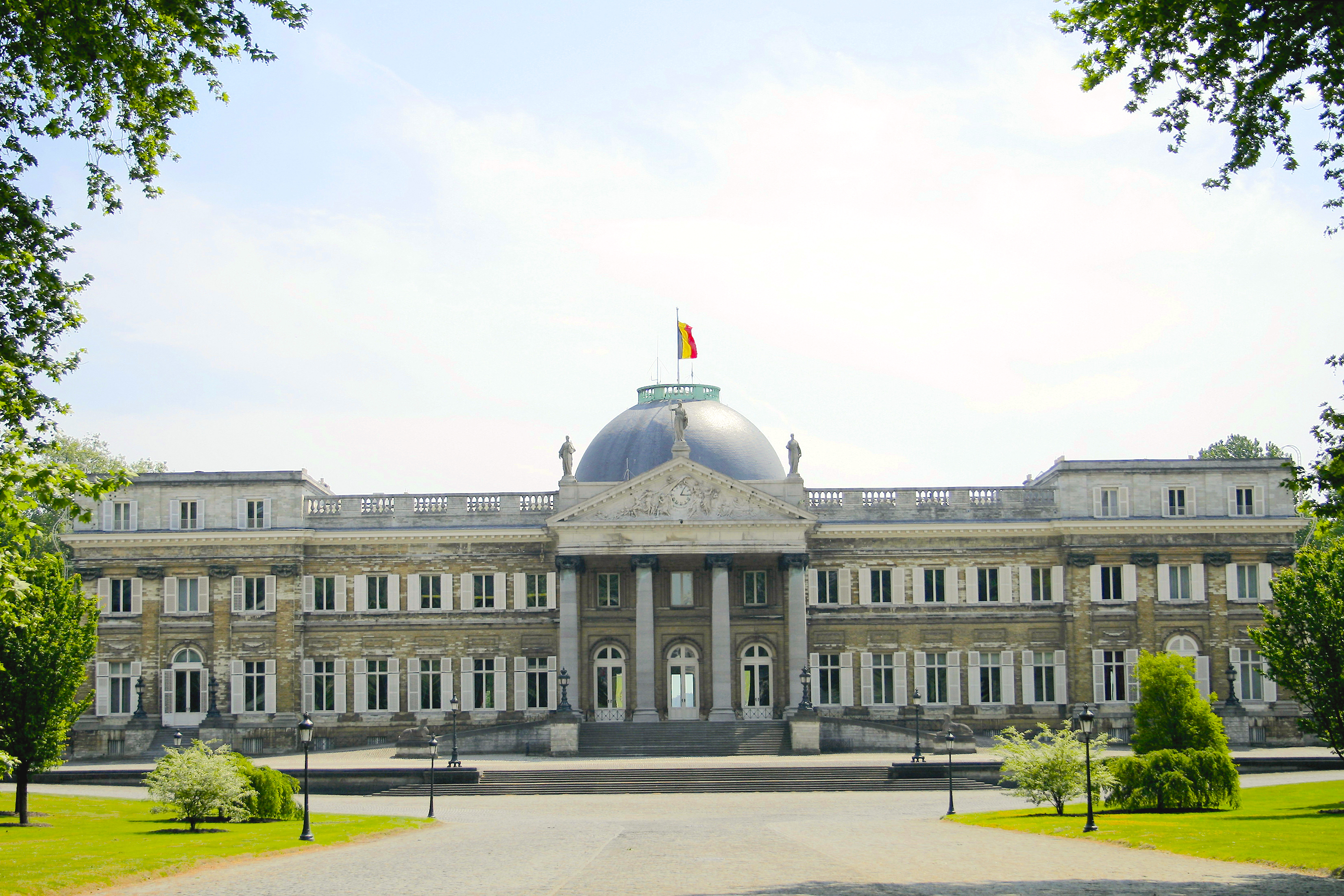
Royal Palace of Laeken

The Royal Palace of Laeken, official home of the Belgian royal family, is situated in Laeken. The palace was built in 1782–1784 by the French architect and urbanist Charles de Wailly. It was partly destroyed by fire in 1890, and was rebuilt and extended by the architect Alphonse Balat. The French architect Charles Girault gave it its present outline in 1902. It has been the royal residence since the accession to the throne of King Leopold I in 1831. The former King Albert II and Queen Paola live in the Belvédère, a château on the grounds of the park surrounding the palace, while King Philippe and Queen Mathilde live in the main palace.

=== Royal Greenhouses ===
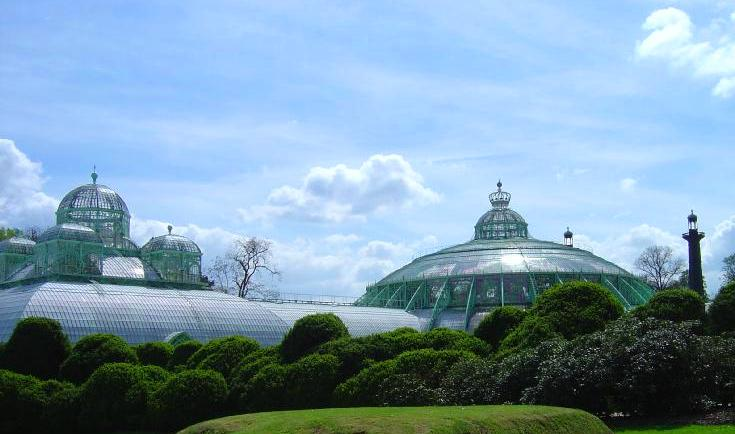
Royal Greenhouses of Laeken

The Royal Domain of Laeken also contains the large Royal Greenhouses of Laeken, a set of monumental dome-shaped constructions, accessible to the public only a few days a year. They were designed by Alphonse Balat, with the cooperation of the young Victor Horta.

=== Church of Our Lady ===
A little south of the Royal Palace is the neo-Gothic Church of Our Lady, initially built as a mausoleum for Queen Louise-Marie, wife of Leopold I, whose children included King Leopold II and Empress Carlota of Mexico. The architect was Joseph Poelaert, designer of the famed Brussels' Palace of Justice. The church contains the Royal Crypt, where the members of the Belgian royal family are buried. In February each year, a memorial mass for deceased members of the royal family is held at the church. In the nave of the church, the tomb of Cardinal Joseph Cardijn can also be found.

=== Laeken Cemetery ===
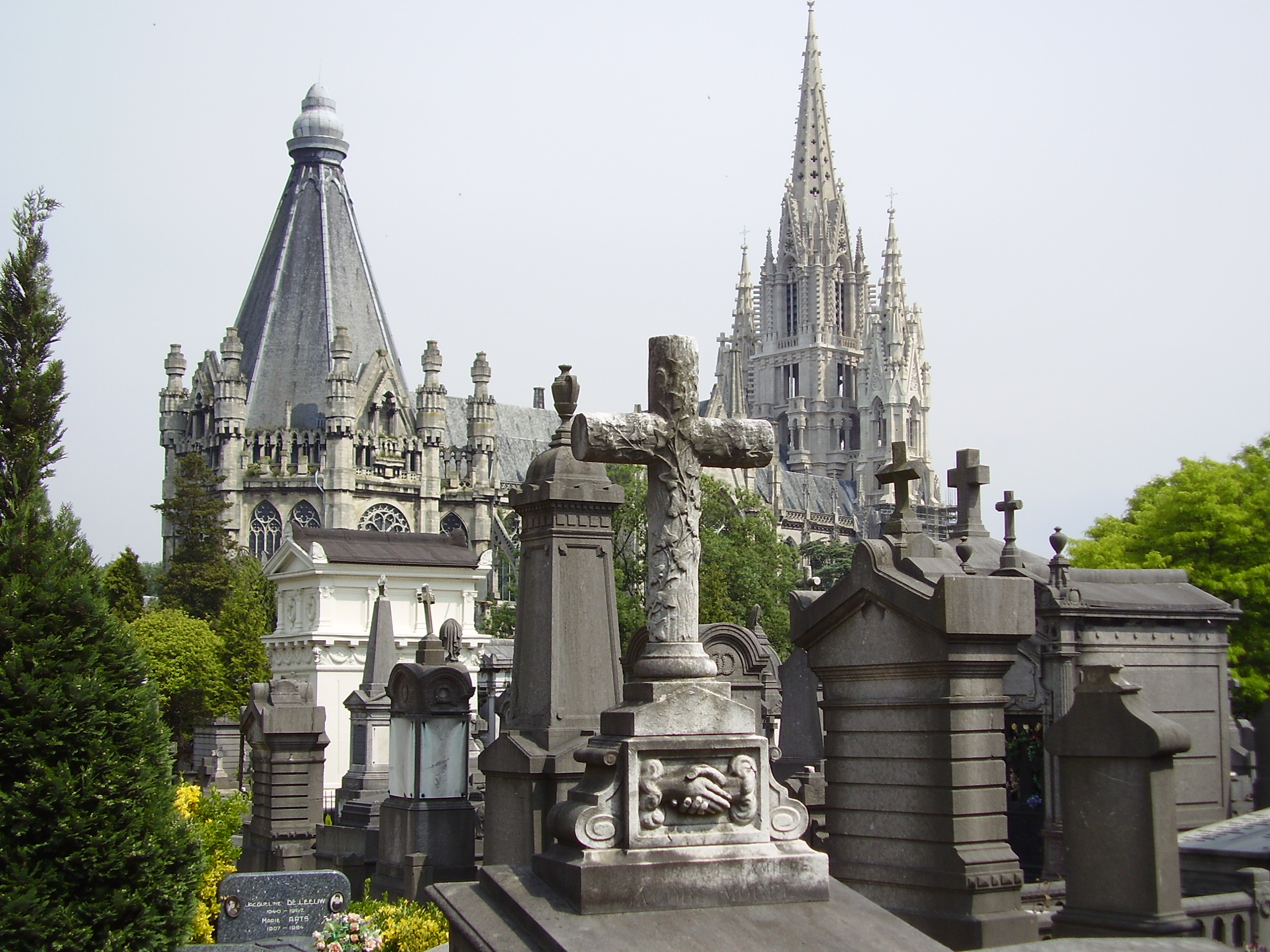
Laeken Cemetery with the Church of Our Lady in the background

Laeken Cemetery, located behind the church, is known as the Belgian Père Lachaise, after the famous cemetery in Paris, because it used to be the burial place of the rich and the famous. It harbours the graves of, among others, the symbolist painter Fernand Khnopff and the opera singer Maria Malibran, and also features an original cast of The Thinker (Le Penseur), by Auguste Rodin.

=== Chinese Pavilion and Japanese Tower ===
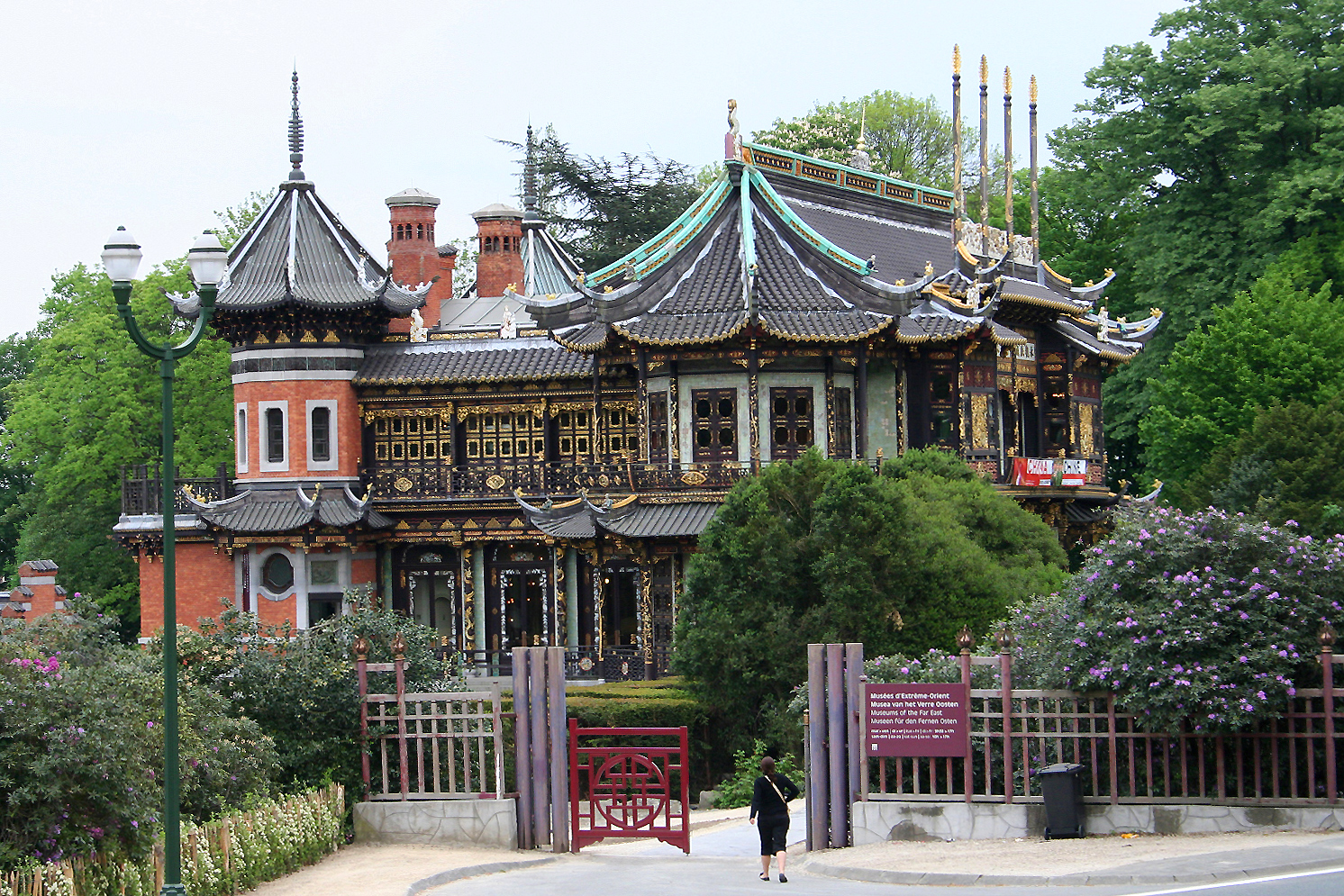
Chinese Pavilion of the Museums of the Far East

A little north of the Royal Palace stand the Chinese Pavilion and the Japanese Tower. They were commissioned by Leopold II and now form part of the Museums of the Far East. The rooms of the Chinese Pavilion are designed in chinoiserie Louis XIV and Louis XVI styles. They are decorated with Chinese motifs, chinaware and silverware. The Japanese Tower is a pagoda (known as a Tō), inspired by a construction Leopold II saw at the Paris Exposition of 1900. Leopold II commissioned his architect Alexandre Marcel to build him a similar one in Laeken.

=== Atomium ===
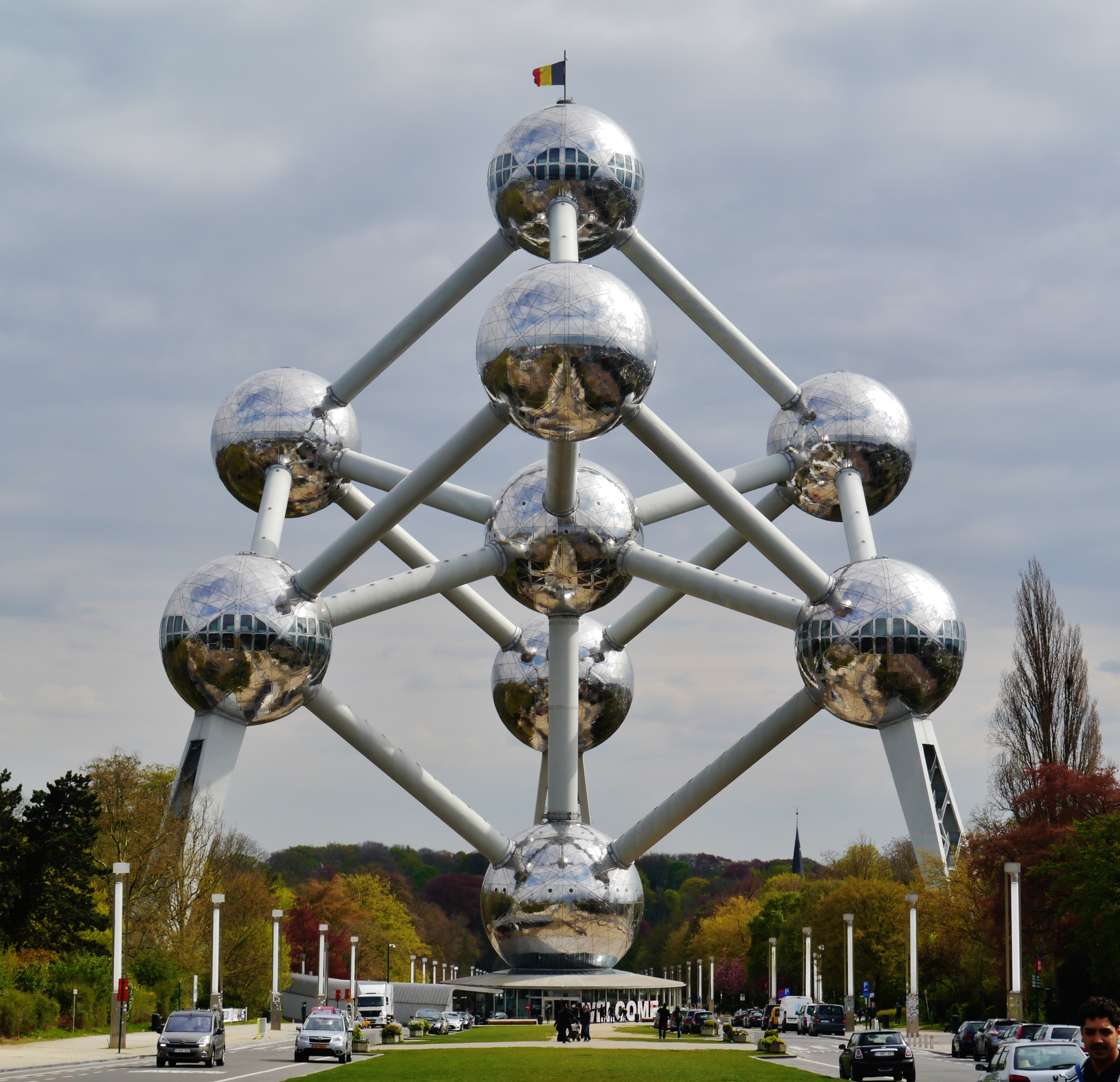
The Atomium

The Atomium is a symbolic 103 m-tall (338 ft) modernist structure, located on the Heysel/Heizel Plateau, which was originally built for the 1958 World's Fair (Expo 58). Consisting of nine steel spheres connected by tubes, it forms a model of an iron crystal (specifically, a unit cell), magnified 165 billion times. The architect André Waterkeyn devoted the building to science. It is now considered a landmark of Brussels.

=== Brussels Expo ===
Opposite the Atomium, the Centenary Palace is one of the lasting remaining buildings of the 1935 World's Fair and is now home to the Brussels Exhibition Centre (Brussels Expo), the city's most important event complex in Belgium and the largest exhibition space in the Benelux.

=== Other places of interest ===
Other places of interest in Laeken include the King Baudouin Stadium, a concert and competition facility with a 50,000 seat capacity, the largest in Belgium. The Bruparck entertainment park (with among others Mini-Europe miniature park and Kinepolis cinema), the Planetarium of the Royal Observatory of Belgium, as well as the Monument to the Dynasty in Laeken Park, are also located there, as is the Palais 12/Paleis 12, a large and modern multiuse indoor arena. Moreover, the nearby Port of Brussels, next to which the Monument to Work by Constantin Meunier was erected, forms part of the industrial landscape of northern Brussels.

The impressive buildings of the former goods station of Tour & Taxis and the surrounding area border the neighbourhood, and are being turned into residences, as well as commercial enterprises.

== Areas ==
- Heysel/Heizel
- Royal Domain of Laeken and Laeken Park
- Mutsaard
- Old Laeken and Port of Brussels
- Verregat
- Tour & Taxis

== Notable inhabitants ==
- Jean Aerts (1907–1992), road bicycle racer
- Elise Caroline Bommer (1832–1910), botanist and mycologist
- Annie Cordy (1928–2020), actress and singer
- Jeanne-Paule Marie "Jeannine" Deckers (1933–1985), singer-songwriter, and a nun, better known as 'The Singing Nun'
- Albert Demuyser (1920–2003), artist and racehorse owner
- Léo Errera (1858–1905), botanist
- Hamza (Hamza Al-Farisi) (born 1994), rapper, singer and record producer
- Pieter Lambrechts (1910–1974), historian and politician
- Étienne-François Letourneur (1751–1817), French lawyer, soldier, and politician of the French Revolution, died there.
- Xavier Mellery (1845–1921), symbolist painter, draughtsman, illustrator and decorative artist
- Paul Ooghe (1899–2001), World War I veteran
- Belgian royal family, including King Philippe, Queen Mathilde and their children
- Armand Swartenbroeks (1892–1980), football player, politician, and mayor of Koekelberg, was born there.
- Stromae (Paul Van Haver) (born 1985), singer-songwriter, rapper, and producer
- Freddy Thielemans (1944–2022), politician and mayor of the City of Brussels
- Joseph Van De Meulebroeck (1876–1958), politician and mayor of the City of Brussels

== See also ==
- Neighbourhoods in Brussels
- History of Brussels
- Culture of Belgium
- Belgium in the long nineteenth century
- Nos Pilifs Farm – Belgian association
