= Royal Domain of Laeken =

Private estate in Brussels, Belgium

- Domaine royal de Laeken (French); Koninklijk Domein van Laken (Dutch)
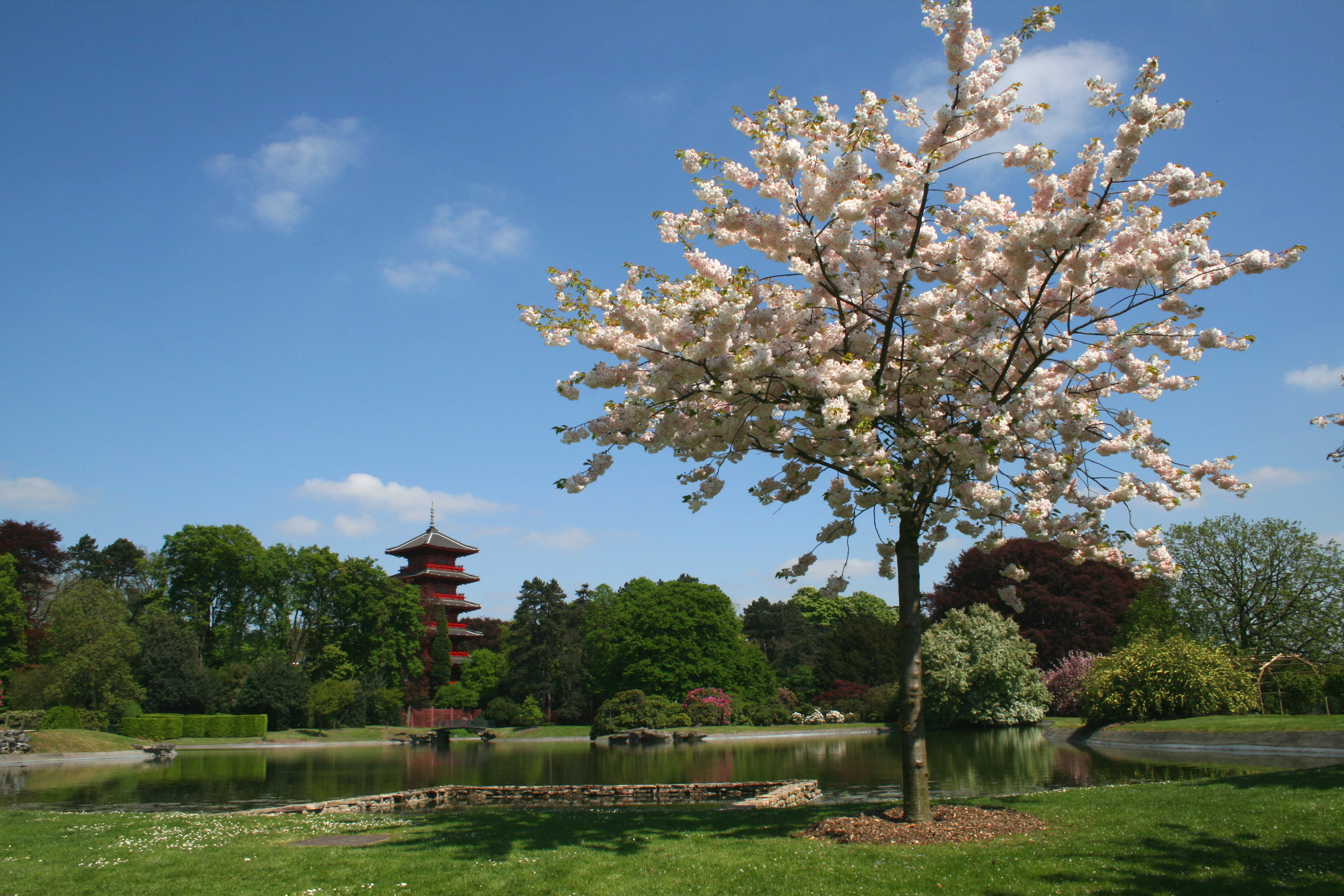
- The gardens of the Royal Domain and the Japanese Tower
- Interactive map of Royal Domain of Laeken
- Type: Private estate
- Location: Laeken, City of Brussels, Brussels-Capital Region, Belgium
- Coordinates: 50°53′13″N 4°21′40″E
- Area: 186 ha (460 acres)
- Operator: Royal Trust
- Public transit: 6 Stuyvenbergh

The Royal Domain of Laeken (French: Domaine royal de Laeken; Dutch: Koninklijk Domein van Laken) is a private estate in Laeken, in the north-west of the City of Brussels, Belgium. The Royal Domain, which is managed by the Belgian Royal Trust, covers 186 ha (460 acres) and consists of three separate private parks containing royal residences and buildings, including the Royal Palace of Laeken, the official residence of the King and Queen of the Belgians. Laeken Park, an urban public park, is also located in the middle of the Royal Domain.

== Description ==
The Royal Domain of Laeken is extensive, about 460 acres (190 ha), or slightly smaller than Monaco. The gardens are surrounded by walls and iron gates, and are closed to the public, although there have been calls for the king to open at least a portion of the park for public use amid the COVID-19 pandemic in Belgium.

The gardens of the Royal Domain are landscaped in English style; the vast park includes lakes, a golf course and artworks. King Leopold II was very closely connected with the designs of his private gardens. It is in these gardens that his only son, Prince Leopold, Duke of Brabant, fell in a pond, and died subsequently from pneumonia, aged only nine. The king had trees planted for his new-born children, which still stand in the park.

There are various pavilions, including the Chinese Pavilion and the Japanese Tower. They were commissioned by Leopold II and now form part of the Museums of the Far East. The rooms of the Chinese Pavilion are designed in chinoiserie Louis XIV and Louis XVI styles. They are decorated with Chinese motifs, chinaware and silverware. The Japanese Tower is a pagoda (known as a Tō), inspired by a construction Leopold II saw at the Paris Exposition of 1900. Leopold II commissioned his architect Alexandre Marcel to build him a similar one in Laeken.

In the gardens live several colonies of wild Canada geese, hundreds of cormorants and other large birds. The gardens are also home to one of the biggest colonies of herons in the country.

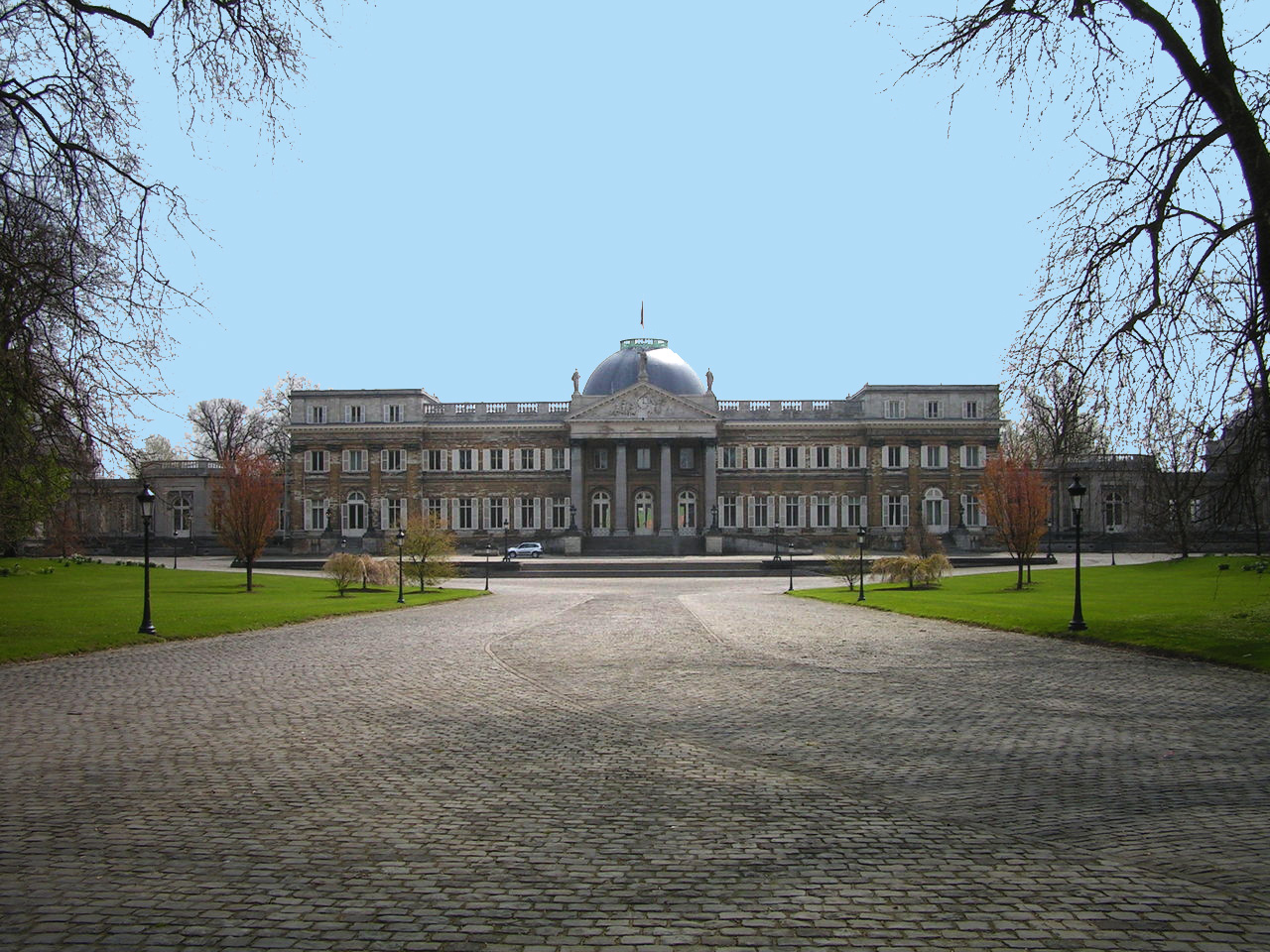
Main façade of the Palace of Laeken

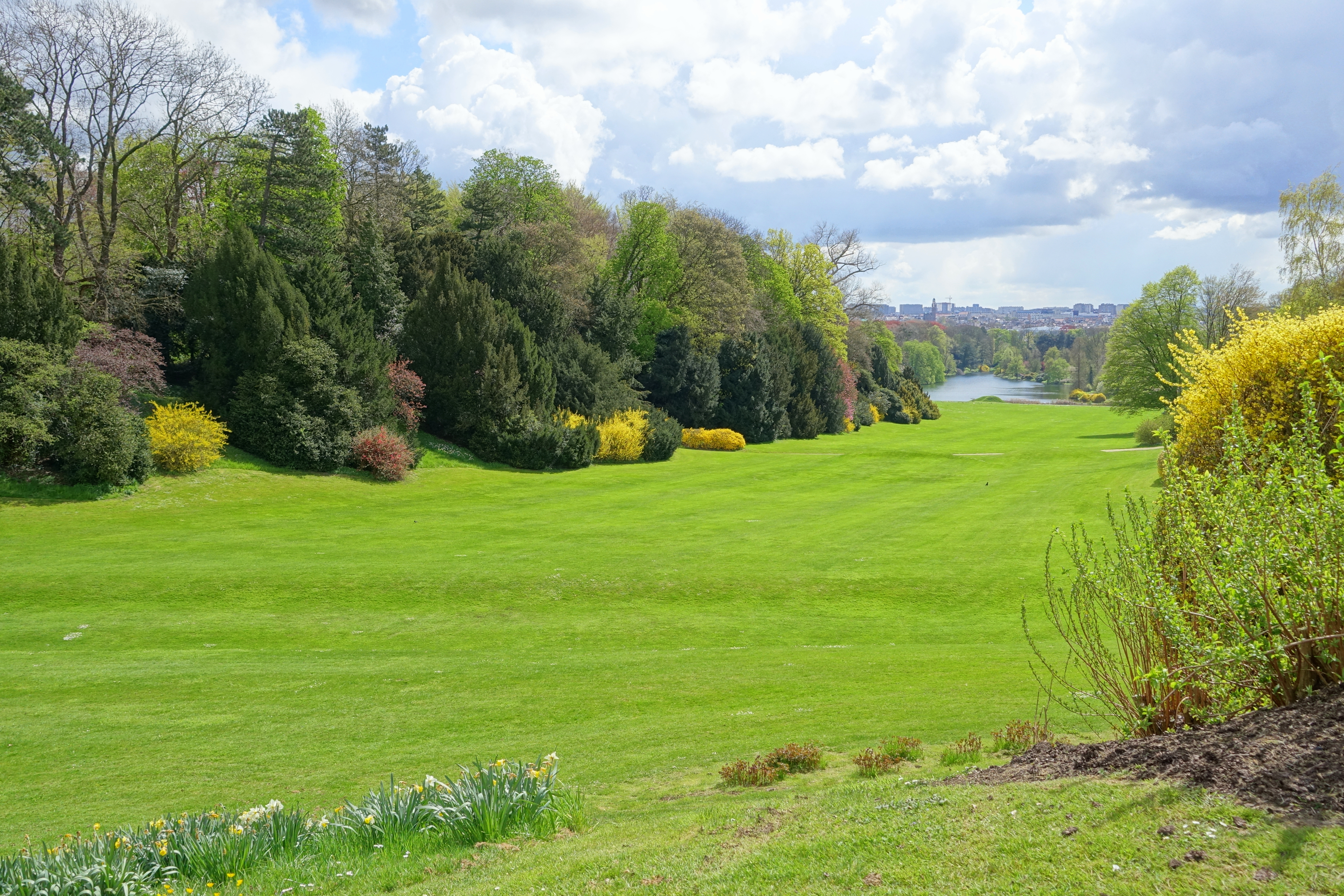
Great Lawn of the Royal Domain

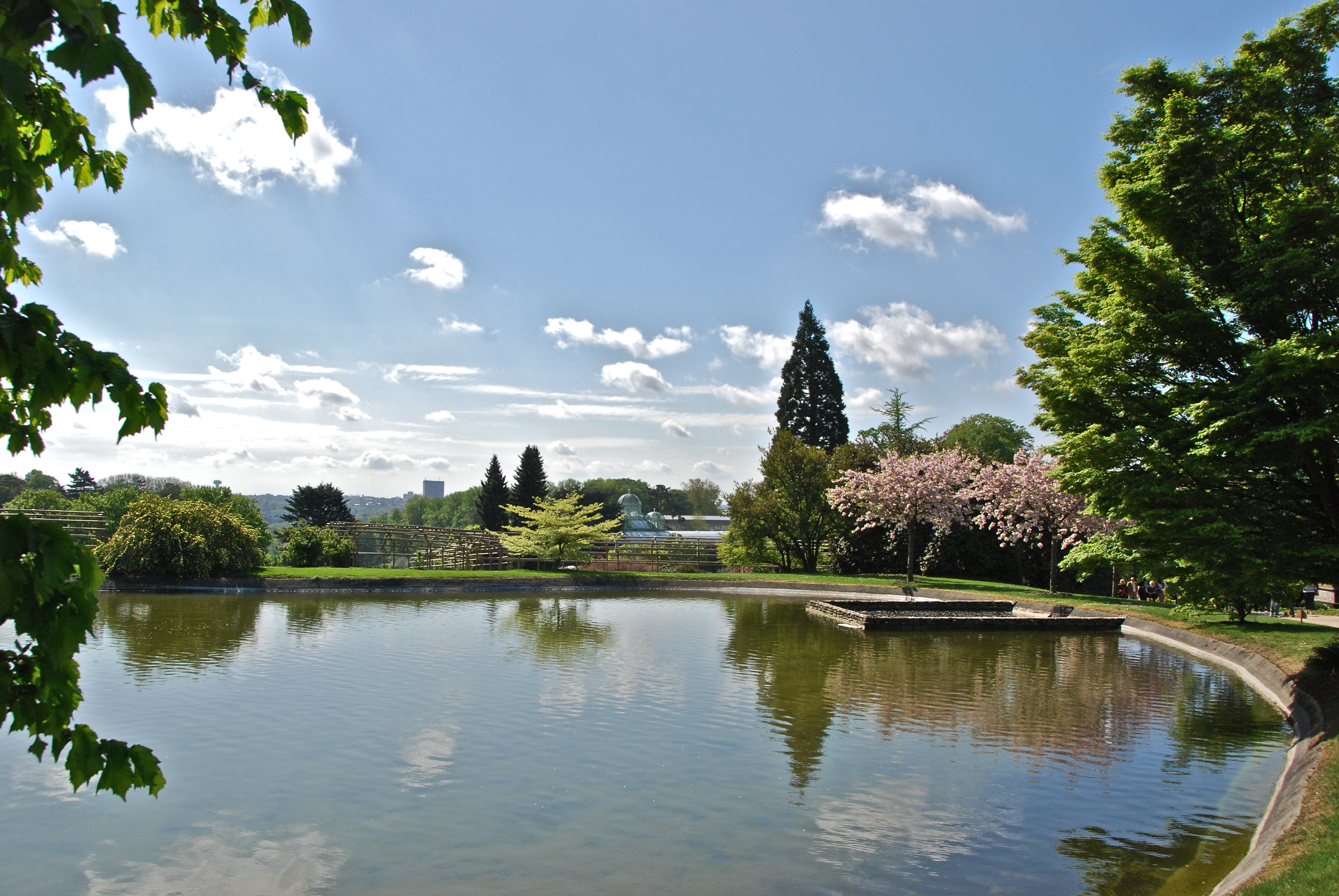
Upper pond of the Royal Domain

== See also ==
- List of parks and gardens in Brussels
- History of Brussels
- Belgium in the long nineteenth century
