= Gédéon =

- Pronunciation: IPA: [ʒe.de.ɔ̃]
- Gender: Male

Origin
- Origin: From the Hebrew language גִּדְעוֹן
- Meaning: "feller", "hewer"

Other names
- Related names: Gideon

Gédéon, (French: IPA: [ʒe.de.ɔ̃]), is a French language masculine given name, derived from the prophet Gideon in the seventh book of the Hebrew Bible's Book of Judges. It is a cognate of the name Gideon.

People named Gédéon include:

- Gédéon Bordiau (1832–1904), Belgian architect
- Gédéon Foulquier (1855–1941), French entomologist
- Gédéon Geismar (1863–1931), French brigadier general and Zionist
- Gédéon Kalulu (born 1997), French footballer
- Gédéon Kyungu, Congolese warlord
- Gédéon Larocque (1831–1903), Canadian politician and physician
- Gédéon Naudet (born 1970), French-American filmmaker
- Gédéon Ouimet (1823–1905), Canadian politician
- Gédéon Pitard (born 1989), Cameroonian footballer
- Gédéon-Mélasippe Prévost (1817–1887), Canadian notary and politician
- Gédéon Rochon (1877–1917), Canadian politician and lawyer
- Gédéon Tallemant des Réaux (1619–1692), French writer

== See also ==
- Gedeon (surname)
