= PYB =

PYB or Pyb may refer to:

- Jeypore Airport (IATA: PYB), Odisha, India
- Pittsburgh Youth Ballet
- Price Your Bike (UCI code: PYB)
- Pymble railway station (station code: PYB)
- руб, abbreviation for the Russian ruble
