= Gedeon (surname) =

Gedeon is a name, derived from the prophet Gideon in the Hebrew Bible's Book of Judges. It is the surname of:

- Ben Gedeon (born 1994), American football player
- Daizy Gedeon (born 1965), Australian-Lebanese journalist and filmmaker
- Elmer Gedeon (1917–1944), American track-and field athlete, baseball player and World War II bomber pilot
- Ghassan Gedeon-Achi (born 1993), Lebanese–Canadian alpine skier
- Jean Gedeon (born 1946), American ballerina, ballet teacher and artistic director
- Joe Gedeon (1893–1941), American baseball player
- Louis Gedeon (1877–1950), U.S. Army sergeant
- Patrik Gedeon (born 1975), Czech national team football player
- Saša Gedeon (born 1970), Czech film director
- Veronica Gedeon (1917–1937), American model
- Wolfgang Gedeon (born 1947), German conspiracy theorist and politician

== See also ==
- Gédéon
