= Great Mosque of Brussels =

Mosque in Brussels, Belgium

- Grande mosquée de Bruxelles (French); Grote Moskee van Brussel (Dutch)
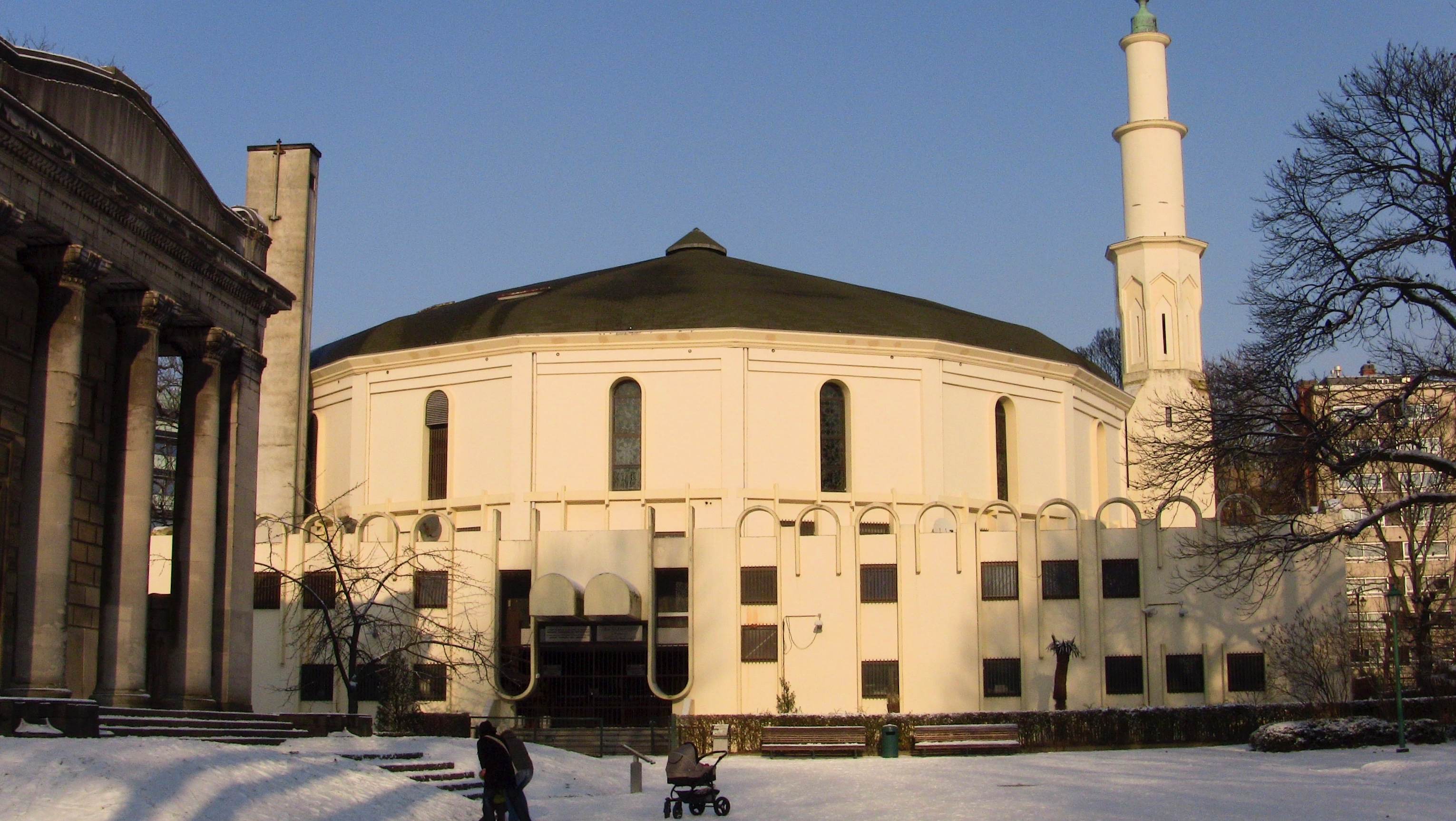

- Location within Brussels

Religion
- Affiliation: Sunni Islam
- Sect: Salafi movement
- Leadership: Salah Echallaoui (2019-2020)

Location
- Location: Brussels
- Country: Belgium
- Interactive map of Great Mosque of Brussels
- Coordinates: 50°50′36″N 4°23′16″E

Architecture
- Architects: Ernest Van Humbeeck (1879); Mongi Boubaker (1978)
- Type: Mosque
- Style: Moorish Revival
- Completed: 1879 (original building); 1978 (transformation)

Specifications
- Dome: 1
- Minaret: 1

The Great Mosque of Brussels (French: Grande mosquée de Bruxelles; Dutch: Grote Moskee van Brussel) is located in the Parc du Cinquantenaire/Jubelpark. Originally built in 1897 as an exhibition attraction, it was transformed into a Muslim place of worship in 1978 by Saudi Arabia, which managed it for forty years. From April 2019 to June 2023, it was run by the Muslim Executive of Belgium, close to the Moroccan administration.

The Great Mosque's role as the leading religious institution within the Belgian Islamic community—as well as its intended role as a diplomatic bridge between the Saudi and Belgian monarchies—has been a point of debate since its re-foundation. The mosque is popular with Muslim diplomats and is a popular location for Belgians seeking to convert to Islam. It has also taught thousands of Muslim students.

== History ==
=== The Oriental Pavilion (1897) ===
The original building was erected by the architect Ernest Van Humbeeck in a neo-Moorish style, to form the Oriental Pavilion of the Brussels International Exposition of 1897. At that time, the pavilion housed a monumental painting on canvas, Panorama of Cairo (exactly titled Cairo and the Banks of the Nile), by the painter Emile Wauters, which enjoyed major success. This work from 1880–81 had been intended for the Neue Panorama in Vienna. Brought back to Belgium after a fire destroyed the Viennese rotunda, the panorama had been stored in an disused warehouse in the municipality of Molenbeek-Saint-Jean. In 1895, however, the painting was purchased by Count Louis Cavens, who donated it to the Belgian state after restoration. In order to house the work, the patron thus had a mosque-shaped building erected at his own expense in the Parc du Cinquantenaire/Jubelpark. Its location at the park's north-western end was chosen during a visit made by the count, the minister of arts Léon de Bruyn, and Gédéon Bordiau, the architect in charge of developing the site.

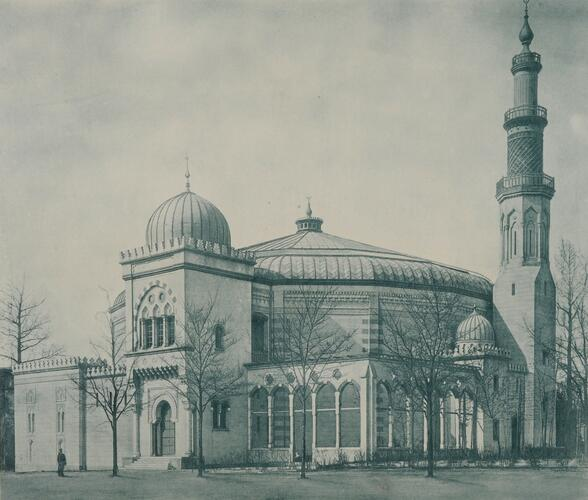
The Oriental Pavilion in 1898, shortly after completion

Built from durable materials—bricks, marble and iron—the building was intended to become an annexe to the Royal Museums of Decorative and Industrial Arts. After the world's fair, however, the building and its panorama were soon closed to the public, and as early as 1901, they started showing signs of deterioration, so the question of their maintenance was raised. The painter Alfred Bastien carried out an initial restoration in 1923, followed by a second in 1950, to repair damage caused to the glass roof during World War II. The attraction finally closed in 1963. The Belgian state did not have the necessary means to maintain the building, which was abandoned, eaten away by humidity and open to all winds. Dismantled in 1971, the canvas eventually disappeared. A few fragments are now preserved in private collections.

=== The Great Mosque (1978) ===
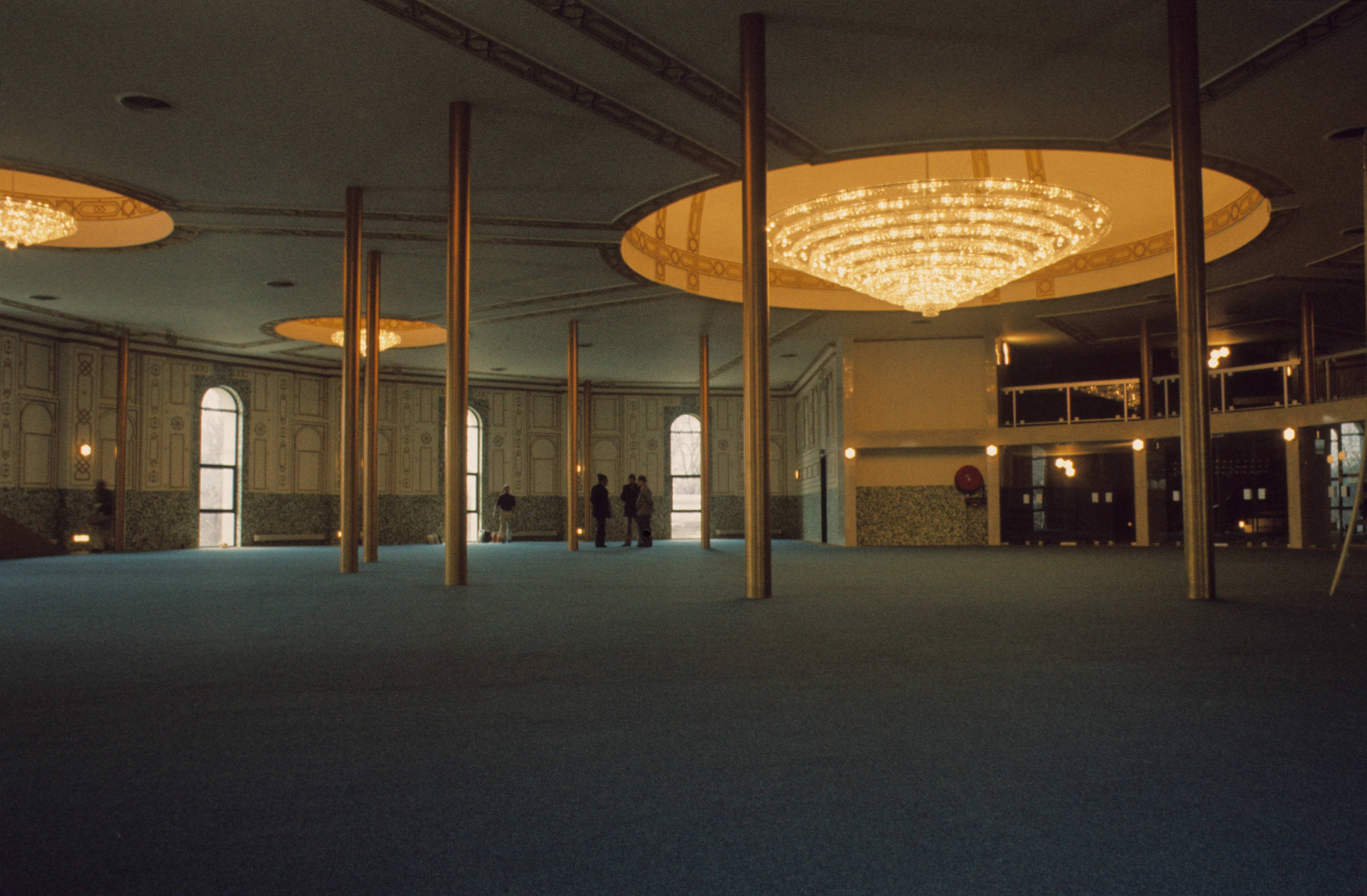
Interior of the Great Mosque in 1977, at the end of transformation work

In 1967, King Baudouin of Belgium lent the building to King Faisal of Saudi Arabia with a 99-year rent-free lease, on an official visit to Belgium as part of negotiations to secure oil contracts. The building was turned into a place of worship for the use of Muslim immigrants to Belgium, who at the time were notably from Morocco and Turkey. As part of the deal, imams from the Gulf area would be hired, and although their orthodox Salafism was of a different tradition than that of the more open-minded Sunni immigrants, according to the politician Georges Dallemagne, their teachings would over time turn these immigrants towards a more orthodox tradition and would also discourage them from integrating into Belgian society.

The mosque, whose round structure was preserved, but whose appearance was thoroughly changed after a long reconstruction carried out at the expense of Saudi Arabia by the Tunisian architect Mongi Boubaker, was solemnly inaugurated in 1978 in the presence of Khalid ibn Abd al-Aziz and Baudouin.

== Organisation ==
By decree signed by the Belgian education minister André Bertouille in 1983, the mosque was put under the control of the Muslim World League, which then received three positions on its board of directors. The mosque is also financed by the Muslim World League, which in turn is financed by the Saudi government. The Islamic Cultural Center (ICC) hosts a school and an Islamic research centre whose objectives are to propagate the Muslim faith. The prayers are in Arabic. The centre also provides courses of Arabic for adults and children, as well as introductory courses in Islam and other activities geared towards solidarity.

The Belgian parliamentarian Willy Demeyer has criticised the mosque's organisation as outdated: "Today, Muslims are present in every district of Belgium and the vast majority of them wish to live out their beliefs in peace – it is to them that we should be handing over the most representative place of Belgian Islam..."

== Controversies ==
=== Accusation of promoting extremism ===
The ICC's director Khalid Alabri, who propagated the Takfiri dogma, was expelled by Belgian authorities for his extreme views in 2012. In the aftermath of the November 2015 Paris attacks, the mosque's imams and officials stated that Islam is a religion of peace and has "nothing to do with the terrorists".

In October 2017, the Belgian secretary of state of asylum and migration, Theo Francken, revoked the residence permit of the mosque's Egyptian-trained imam, Abdelhadi Sewif. Francken cited his salafist ideology, his conservative stance and the imam being a danger to Belgian society and national security as reasons for the revocation. Sewif denied any connection with extremism and appealed to the country's highest migration authority, but Belgium's deputy premier, Jan Jambon, shot down his chance of a successful appeal.

A public commission investigating the 2016 Brussels bombings found that 9 participants of courses at the mosque had joined the ranks of foreign fighters of radical groups in the Middle East. Due to these findings, the commission recommended in October 2017 that Saudi control of the mosque be annulled. The commission also stated that the mosque's salafi and wahhabist doctrine were antithetical to a liberal Islam compatible with European society.

While the mosque's leadership claims to promote an inclusionist vision of Islam, Belgian authorities have stated that the mosque encourages worshippers to close themselves off from mainstream Belgian society and that the lead imam, Abdelhadi Sewif, spoke neither French nor Dutch, Belgium's official languages.

=== Saudi Arabia relinquishing control ===
In February 2018, Saudi Arabia agreed to give up control of the mosque in a sign that it is trying to shed its reputation as a global exporter of an ultra-conservative brand of Islam.

On 16 March 2018, Belgium's Council of Ministers decided to end the concession and transfer its exploitation to the Muslim Executive of Belgium and a charity of local believers. A transition period of one year was decided, enabling the creation of a structure that will associate the Muslim Executive and the yet to form association. The government thus enacted a recommendation of the commission investigating the 2016 Brussels bombings that aimed at ending interference of foreign states in the Islam taught in Belgium.

In December 2020, the Belgian minister of justice, Vincent Van Quickenborne, issued a negative advisory, suspending the procedure for recognition of the new Association de gestion de la grande mosquée de Bruxelles (AGMB) non-profit management association. The State Security Service found three of the structure's members linked to Moroccan intelligence and one employed by Turkey's Diyanet. The Académie de Formations et de Recherches en Etudes Islamiques (AFOR) non-profit, created as an independent training centre for imams, had only four students. As of 2018, the non-profit Centre Islamique et Culturel de Belgique, or, in Dutch, Islamitisch en Cultureel Centrum van België (lit. 'Islamic and Cultural Center of Belgium'), which used to have its seat at the mosque, is being dissolved.

== Area ==
In the immediate vicinity of the Great Mosque, the Monument to the Belgian Pioneers in Congo depicts a scene called Belgian military heroism wipes out the (Arab) slave trader. Visitors of the mosque complained about the mention of the Arab slave trader. Together with the Jordanian and Saudi ambassadors, the mosque's imam filed a complaint regarding the inscription, leading to the removal of the mention Araabschen / arabe in 1988.

== See also ==
- Foreign relations of Saudi Arabia
- Islam in Belgium
- Islamic schools and branches
