= Monument to the Belgian Pioneers in Congo =

Monument in Brussels, Belgium

- Monument aux pionniers belges au Congo (French); Monument voor de Belgische pioniers in Congo (Dutch)
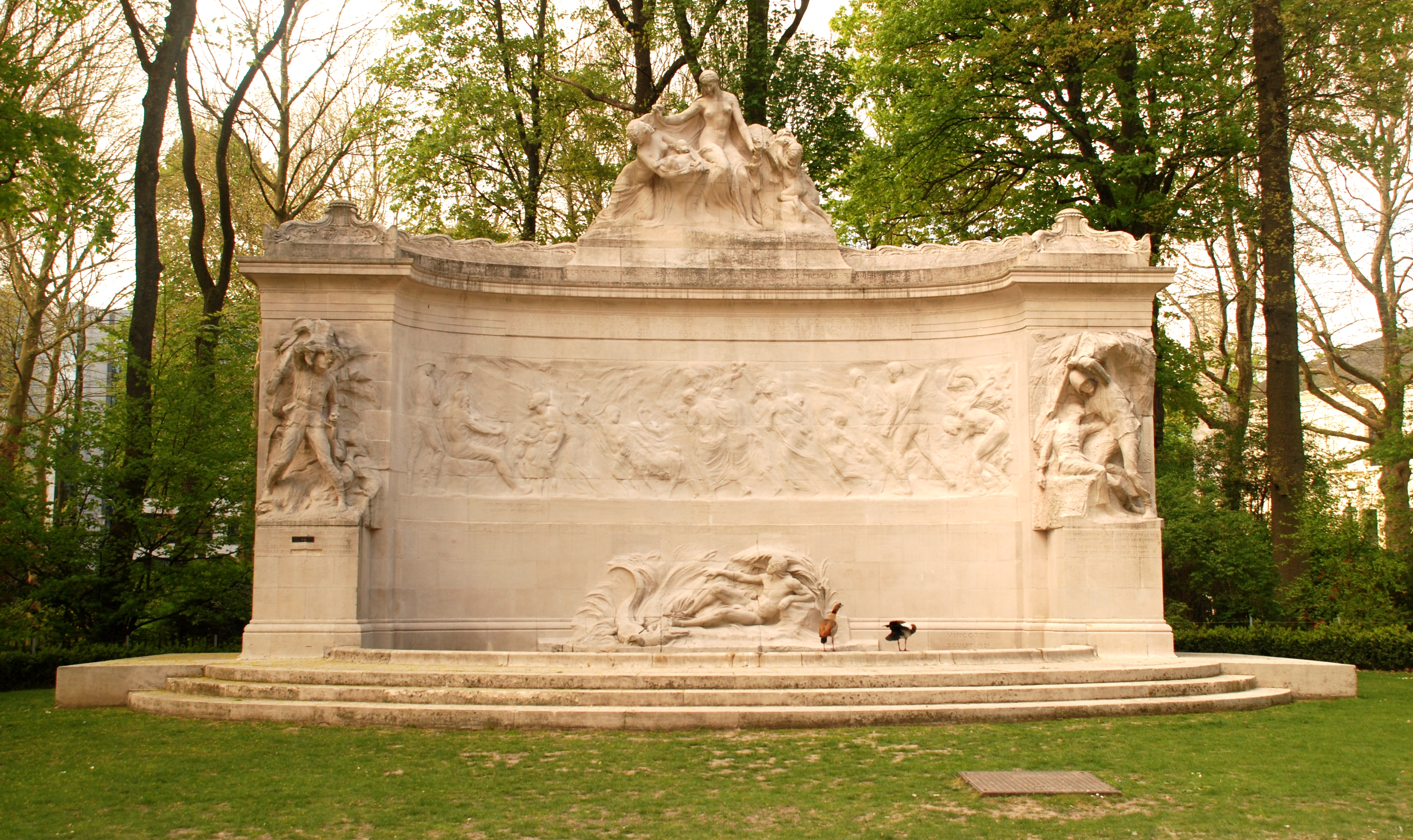
- Interactive map of Monument to the Belgian Pioneers in Congo
- Location: Parc du Cinquantenaire / Jubelpark; 1000 City of Brussels, Brussels-Capital Region, Belgium
- Coordinates: 50°50′33″N 4°23′16″E
- Designer: Thomas Vinçotte
- Completion date: 1921
- Dedicated to: Belgian pioneers in the former Belgian Congo

The Monument to the Belgian Pioneers in Congo (French: Monument aux pionniers belges au Congo; Dutch: Monument voor de Belgische pioniers in Congo) is an allegorical monument in the Parc du Cinquantenaire/Jubelpark in Brussels, Belgium. It was designed by the sculptor Thomas Vinçotte and crafted between 1911 and 1921 to commemorate the Congo Free State. In particular, it honours the Belgian 'pioneers' (soldiers) who 'brought civilisation' to the Congo, especially through the Congo–Arab War (1892–1894) that sought to conquer present-day East Congo, and illustrates the Belgian raids against the Arab slave traders there.

The monument does not portray Leopold II himself, but prominently features a bilingual quote to justify the colonial project: I undertook the Congo project in the interest of civilisation and for the good of Belgium. Leopold II, 3 June 1906. Partly due to this and the proximity of the Great Mosque of Brussels, an inscription regarding the Arab slave trade is the subject of ongoing controversy.

== History ==
Planned in 1909, the day after the death of King Leopold II, the Monument to the Belgian Pioneers in Congo was meant to be a patriotic hommage to the so-called 'civilising mission' of the first Belgian colonials, and more specifically, to the transfer of the Congo Free State by Leopold II to Belgium in 1908. In 1911, a national committee was founded, under the auspices of Leopold's successor, Albert I, in order to oversee the monument's construction, which was partially financed by the Belgian state, by the City of Brussels, as well as through a subscription. Given his fame, the sculptor Thomas Vinçotte was chosen directly, without recourse to a competition. Entirely created by the sculptor, who however sought the technical advice of the architect Ernest Acker, the memorial was designed from 1912 and sculpted on site. Due to the First World War and Vinçotte's poor health, however, the monument was only finished and unveiled by Albert I and his wife, Queen Elisabeth, in 1921.

== Description ==
The monument is sculpted in white limestone of Euville and is conceived as a romantic work with elements of Art Nouveau. It consists of a big curved wall divided in five sculptures, which form five separate idealised scenes of Belgian pioneers in the former Belgian Congo. Although contemporary with the appearance of expressionism and modernism, the work clearly relates to the pre-war world.

=== Frieze, entablature and cornice ===
The large central frieze in bas-relief is composed of three parts, which read both in French and Dutch: Les Explorateurs / de Ontdekkers (The Discoverers, right); le Missionnaire / de Zendeling (The Missionary, at the centre); and les Belges au Congo / de Belgen in Congoland (The Belgians in Congo, left).

On the entablature above the frieze, the inscription reads: J'ai entrepris l'œuvre du Congo dans l'intérêt de la civilisation et pour le bien de la Belgique. Ik heb het Congowerk ondernomen in het belang der beschaving en voor het welzijn van België. Léopold II 3 juin 1906 (I undertook the Congo project in the interest of civilisation and for the good of Belgium. Leopold II, 3 June 1906) and on the cornice: Opgericht ter eere der eerste belgische baanbrekers / Monument élevé aux premiers pionniers belges (Established honouring the first Belgian pioneers).

The allegorical sculptural group Het zwarte ras door België onthaald / La race noire accueillie par la Belgique (The black race welcomed by Belgium) is located centrally on top of the cornice. A seated white woman with a torch in her hand lifts her veil for a semi-naked African woman who presents her children.

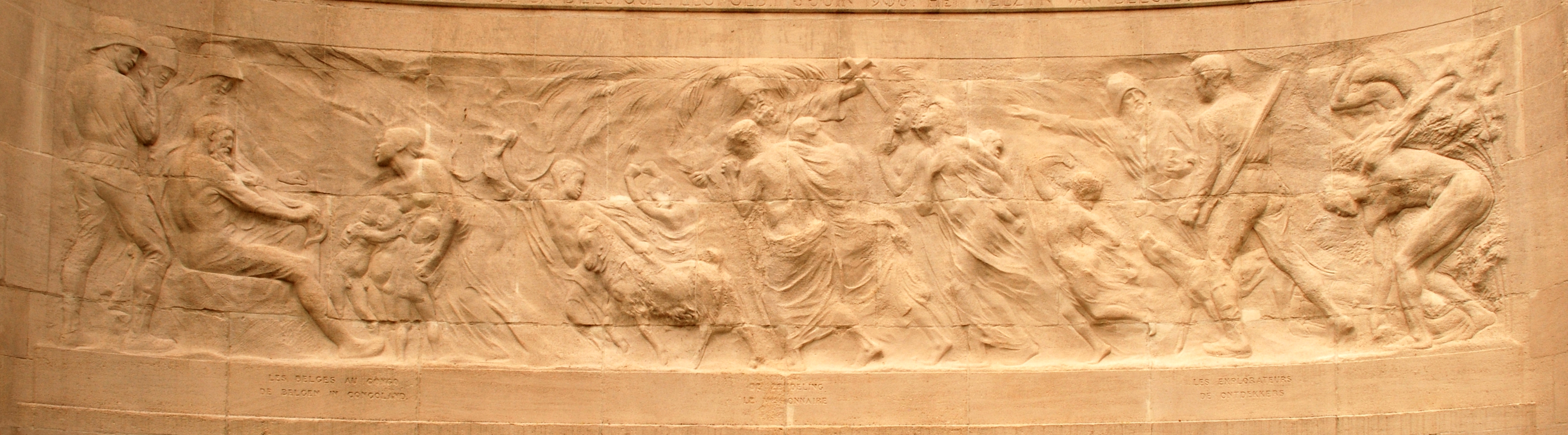
Frieze (from right to left): The Discoverers – The Missionary – The Belgians in Congo

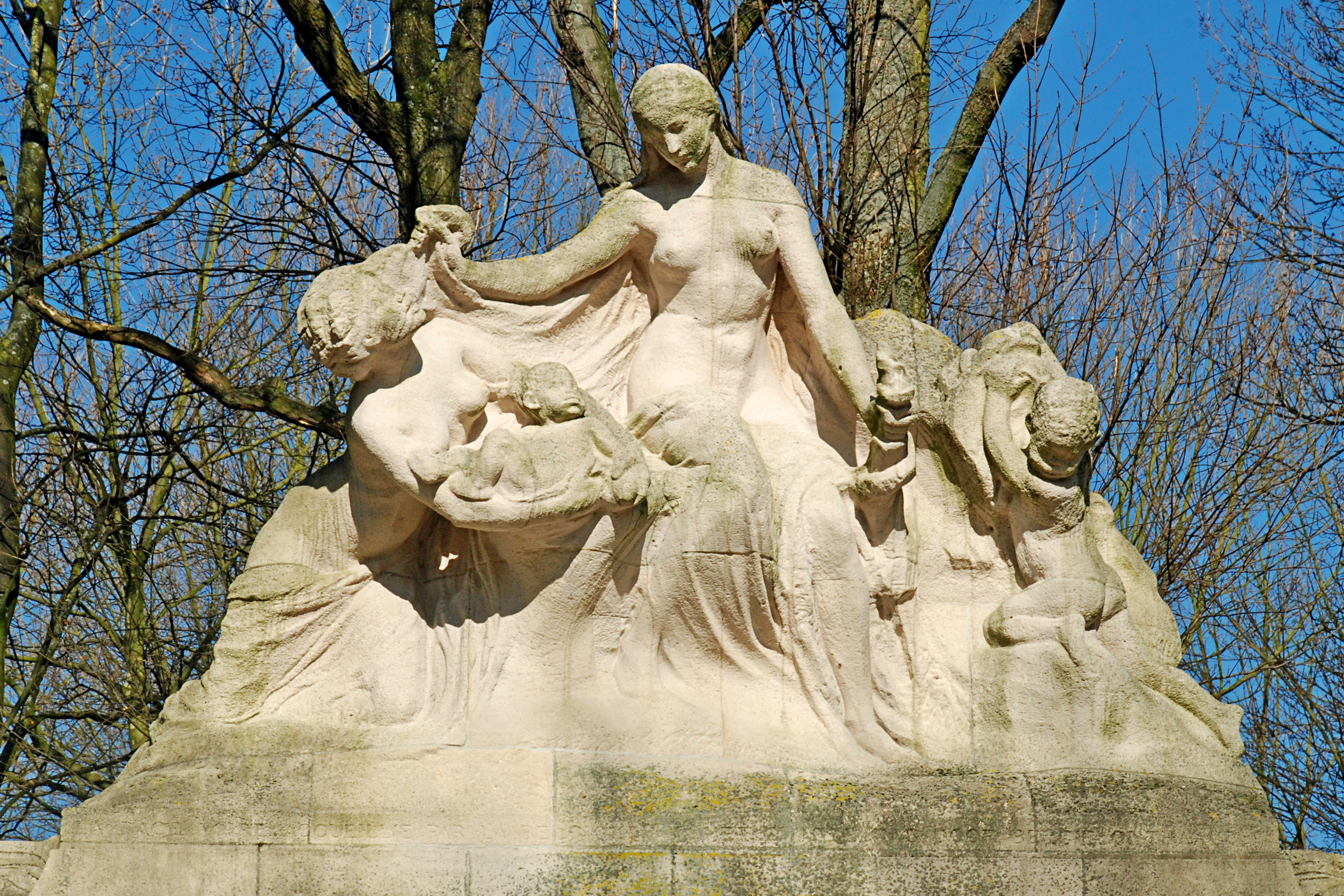
The black race welcomed by Belgium

=== Other sculptures ===
The left side of the monument shows a sculptural group representing a group of Arabs throwing a slave to the ground, but who are subjugated by a Belgian soldier. The inscription reads: L'héroïsme militaire belge anéantit l'(Arabe) esclavagiste / De Belgische militaire heldenmoed verdelgt den (arabische) slavendrijver (Belgian military heroism wipes out the (Arab) slave trader). It illustrates the raids of baron Francis Dhanis against the Arab slave traders.

The right side of the monument shows another sculptural group representing a Belgian soldier protecting his officer, entitled Le soldat belge se dévoue pour son chef blessé à mort / De belgische soldaat offert zijn leven voor zijnen ter dode gekwetsten overste (The Belgian soldier devotes himself to his mortally wounded leader).

At the bottom centre, on the edge of the basin, the Congo river is allegorically depicted by a languishing Congolese youth lying in vegetation with a crocodile at his feet. The mention Le fleuve Congo / De stroom Congo (The Congo river) is engraved in the stone at the base of this group.

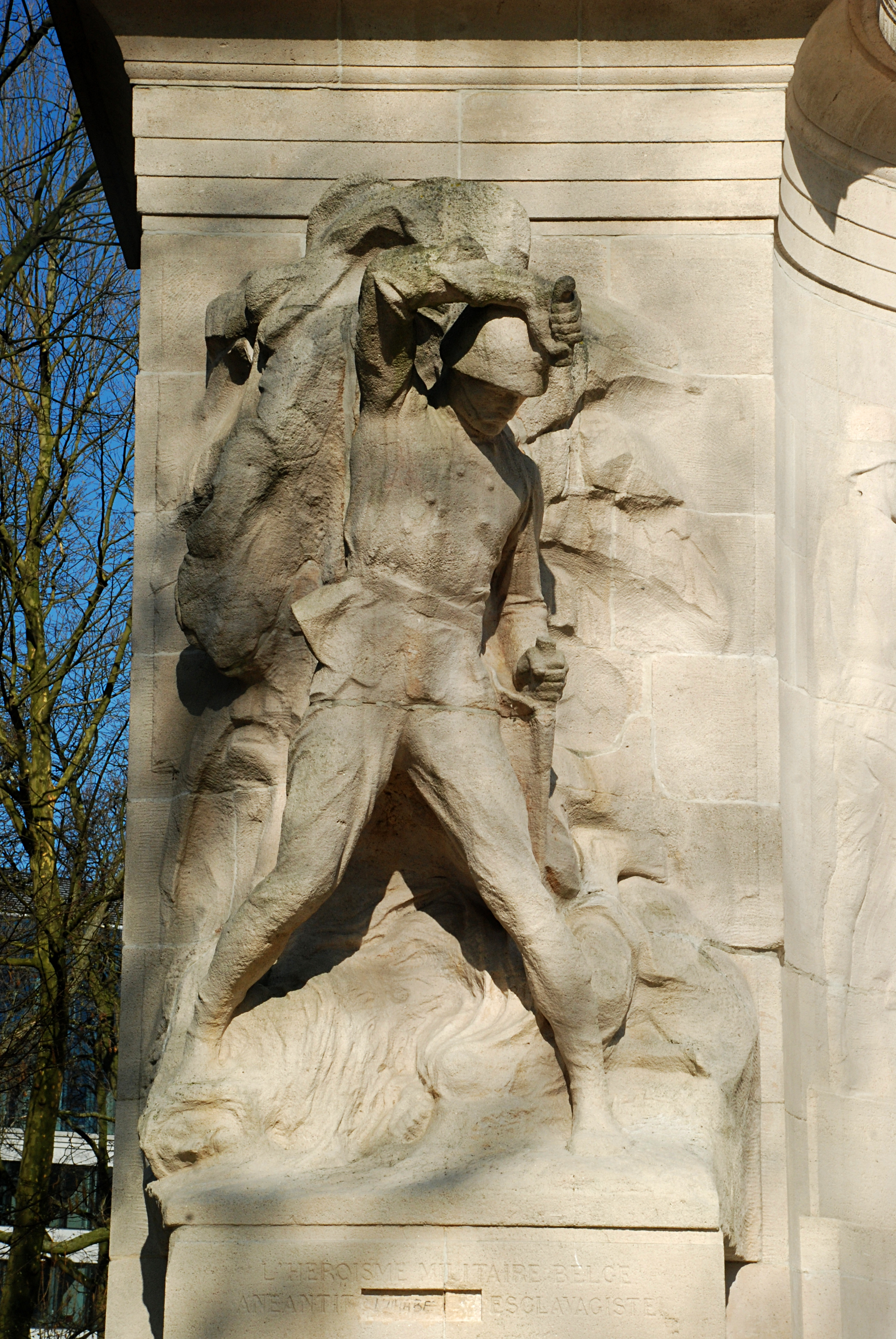
Belgian military heroism wipes out the (Arab) slave trader

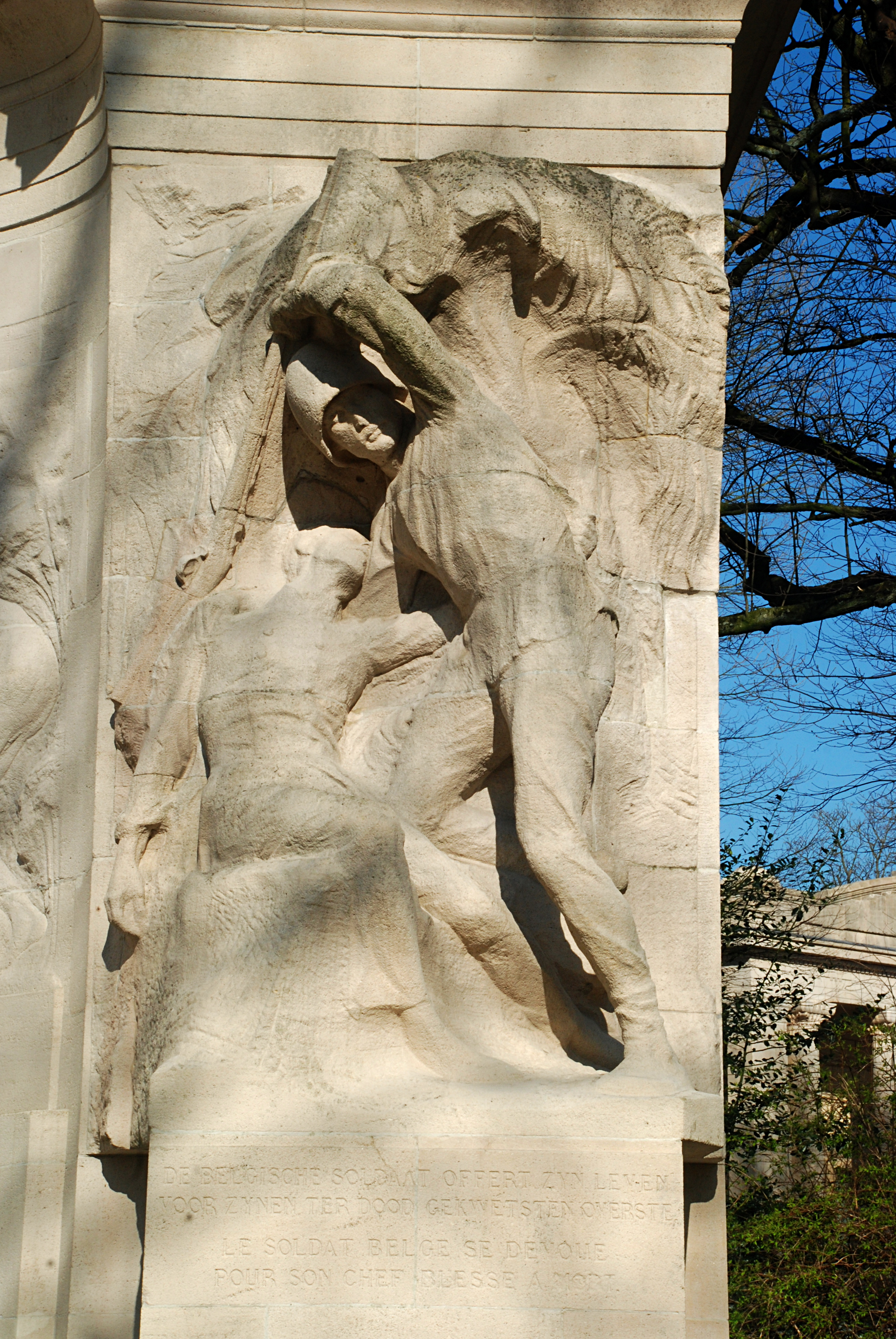
The Belgian soldier devotes himself to his mortally wounded leader

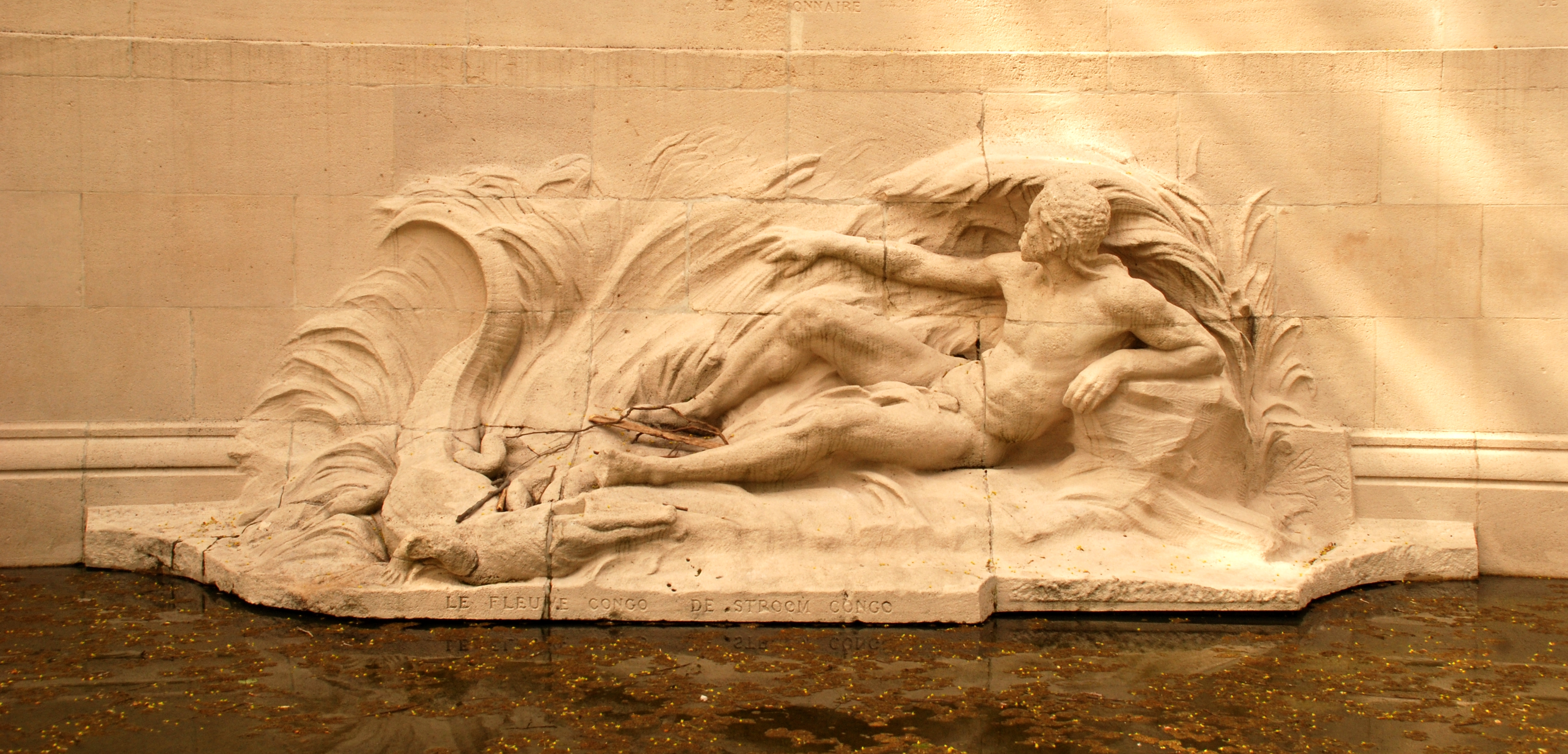
Allegory of the Congo river

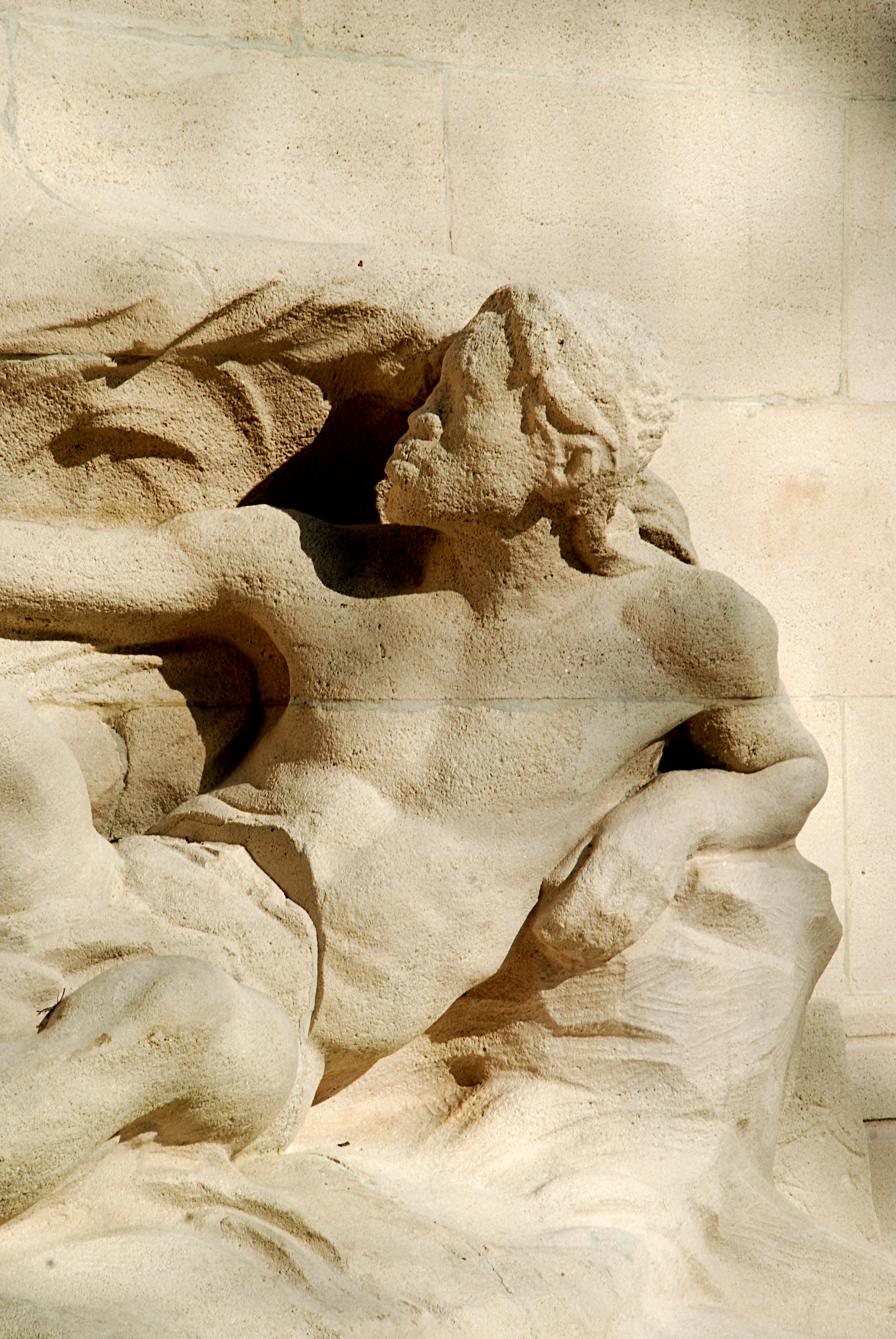
Detail

== Controversy ==
Since the 1980s, the monument has become increasingly controversial. On the one hand, the glorification of Belgium's colonial past has been increasingly contested. On the other hand, the words Arab slave trader on one of the inscriptions has been a source of contention for the Arab Muslim population in Brussels, partly due to the proximity of the Great Mosque of Brussels. After a complaint by the Arab League, the words Araabschen / arabe were removed in 1988. The words were restored in 1992 after a demand by the Belgian nationalist Cercle royal des anciens officiers des campagnes d'Afrique, but the French version was again removed in 2005. In 2011, Ecolo politician Évelyne Huytebroeck decided to include an educational caption. In 2020, two far-right politicians from Vlaams Belang, Dries Van Langenhove and Bob De Brabandere, once more restored the words Araabschen / arabe, as a reaction on what they described as a "current-day Beeldenstorm and hypocritical cult of apologies". The words were again removed shortly thereafter.

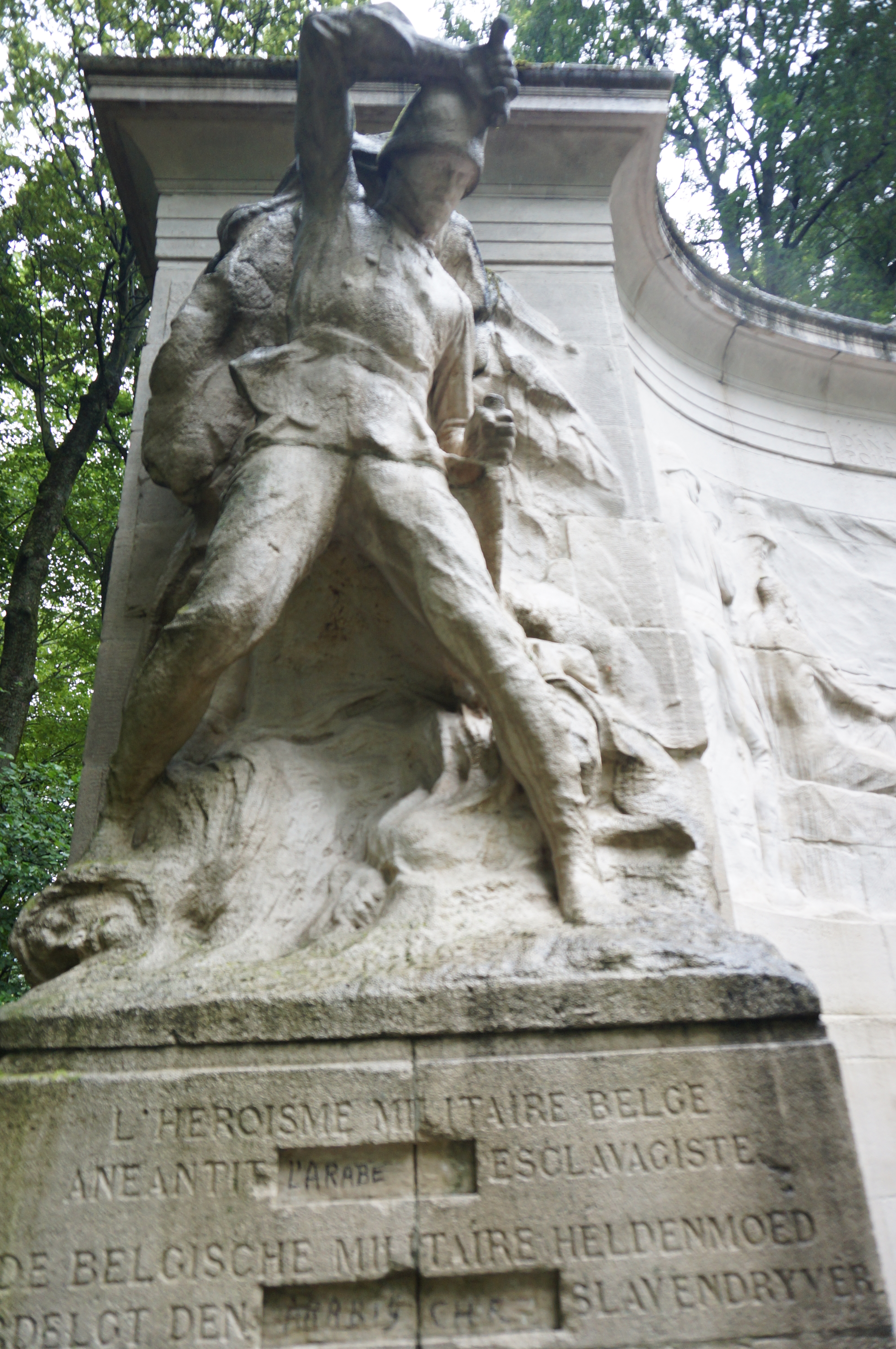
The Belgian soldier and the Arab slave trader, with a part of the inscription removed

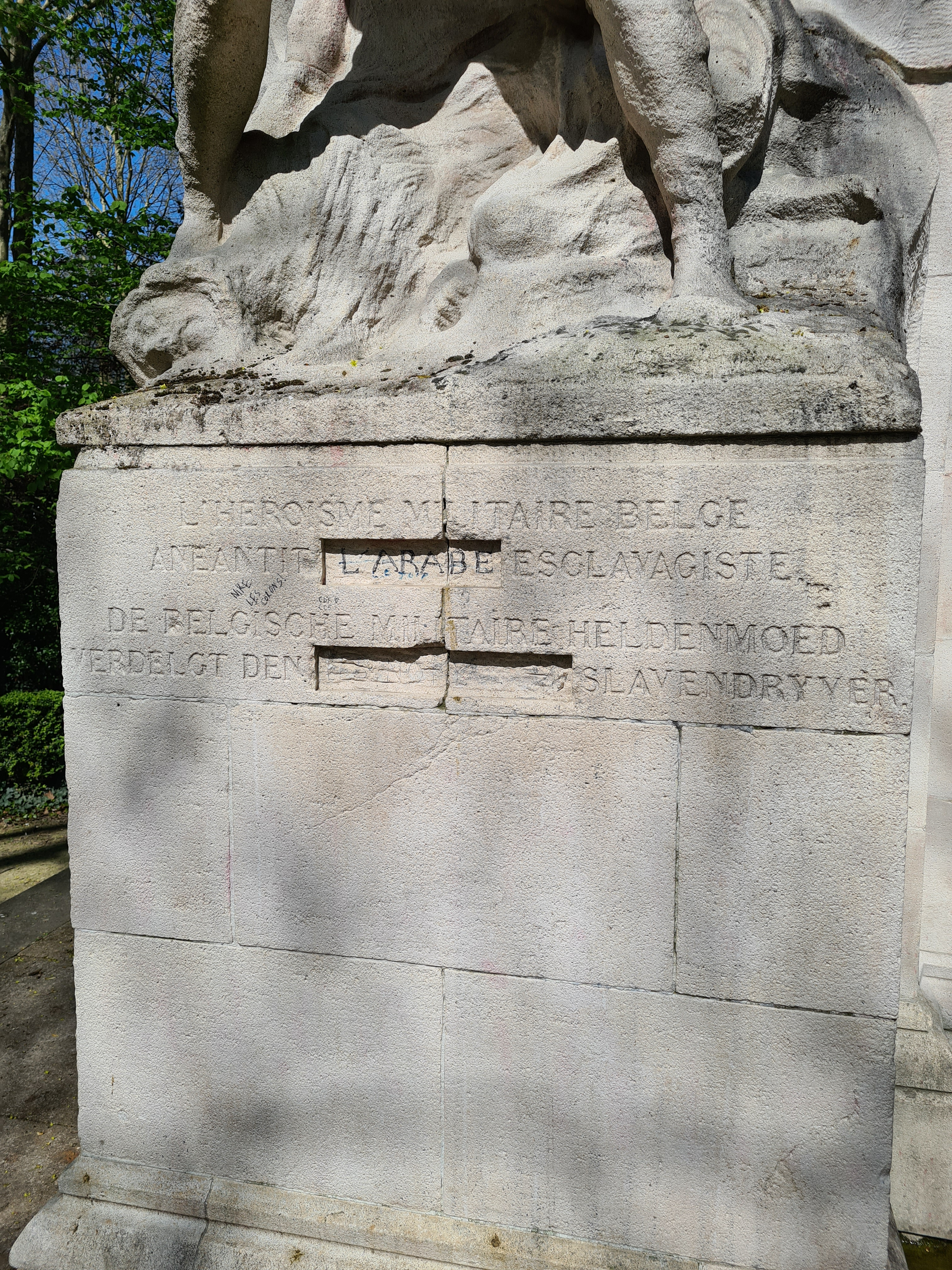
Modified inscription Belgian military heroism crushes the (Arab) slave trader, April 2022

== See also ==
- Art Nouveau in Brussels
- Sculpture in Brussels
- History of Brussels
- Culture of Belgium
- Belgium in the long nineteenth century
