= Cinquantenaire =

Park in Brussels, Belgium

- Parc du Cinquantenaire (French); Jubelpark (Flemish)
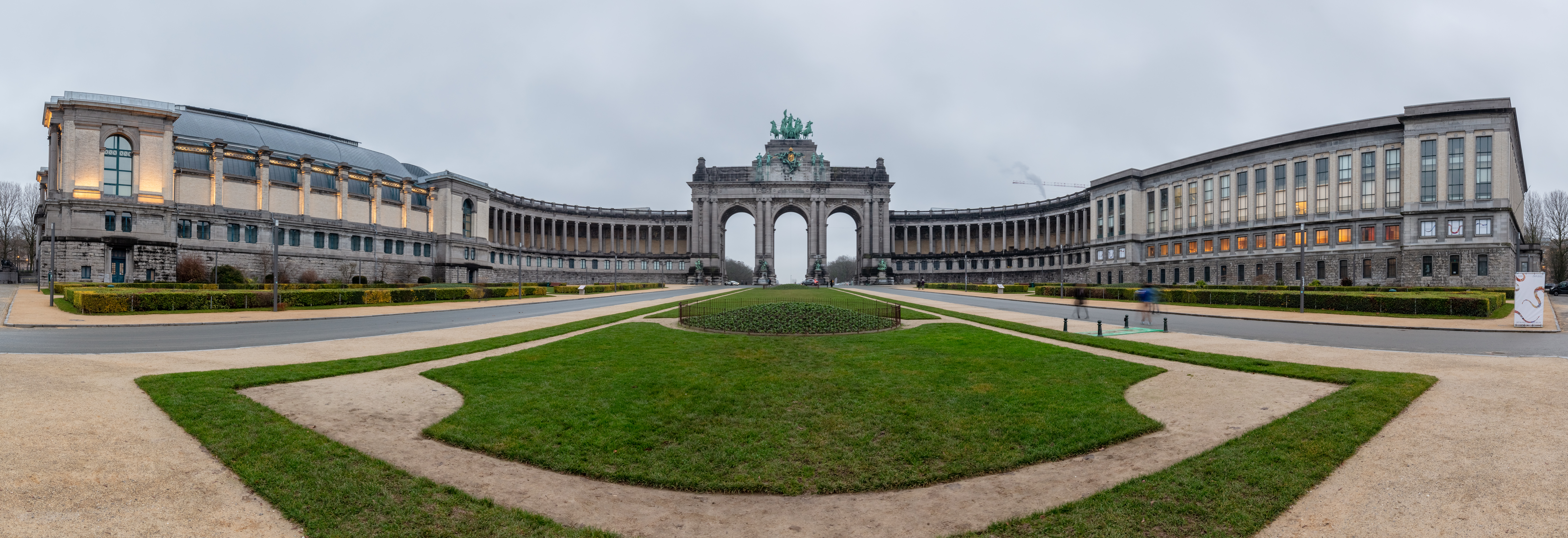
- The centrepiece Cinquantenaire Arch with the U-shaped arcade and large halls on both sides
- Interactive map of Cinquantenaire
- Type: Public leisure park, pedestrian square
- Location: City of Brussels, Brussels-Capital Region, Belgium
- Coordinates: 50°50′26″N 4°23′34″E
- Area: 30 ha (74 acres)
- Created: 1880
- Status: Open year-round
- Public transit: Brussels-Schuman; 1 5 Schuman and Merode

The Parc du Cinquantenaire (pronounced [paʁk dy sɛ̃kɑ̃t(ə)nɛːʁ]; French for 'Park of the Fiftieth Anniversary') or Jubelpark (pronounced [ˈjybəlˌpɑr(ə)k]; Dutch for 'Jubilee Park') is a large urban public park of 30 ha (74 acres) in the easternmost part of the European Quarter in Brussels, Belgium.

Most buildings of the U-shaped complex that dominate the park were commissioned by the Belgian government under the patronage of King Leopold II for the 1880 National Exhibition commemorating the 50th anniversary of the Belgian Revolution. During successive exhibitions, more structures were added to the site. The centrepiece memorial arch, known as the Cinquantenaire Arch (French: Arc du Cinquantenaire; Dutch: Triomfboog van het Jubelpark), was erected in 1905, replacing a previous temporary version of the arcade by Gédéon Bordiau. The surrounding 30 ha (74 acres) park esplanade was full of picturesque gardens, ponds and waterfalls. It housed several trade fairs, exhibitions and festivals at the beginning of the 20th century. In 1930, the government decided to reserve the Cinquantenaire for use as a leisure park.

The Royal Museum of the Armed Forces and Military History has been the sole tenant of the northern half of the complex since 1880. The southern half has been occupied by the Art & History Museum (formerly the Cinquantenaire Museum) since 1889, and Autoworld automobile museum since 1986. The Pavilion of Human Passions by Victor Horta, a remainder from 1896, the Monument to the Belgian Pioneers in Congo from 1921, and the Great Mosque of Brussels from 1978, are located in the north-western corner of the park (see map below).

Lines 1 and 5 of the Brussels Metro and the Belliard Tunnel from the Rue de la Loi/Wetstraat pass underneath the park, the latter partly in an open section in front of the arch. The nearest metro stations are Schuman to the west of the park, and Merode immediately to the east.

== History ==
Originally, the area now known as the Cinquantenaire/Jubelpark (French/Dutch) was part of the military exercise ground of the Garde Civique outside of Brussels' city centre, the so-called Linthout plains. For the National Exhibition of 1880, the plain was developed as an exhibition space. The location was named Cinquantenaire in French (literally "Fiftieth Anniversary") and Jubelpark in Dutch ("Jubilee Park") because it was planned to celebrate the half-century since Belgian independence in 1830.

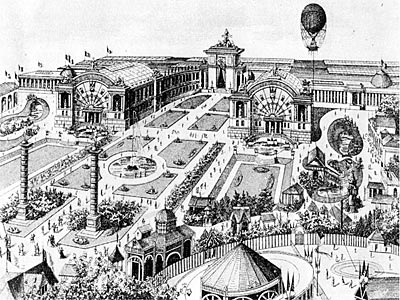
The inauguration of the Parc du Cinquantenaire/Jubelpark at the 1880 National Exhibition (Note: Note the substitute arch, the intact southern Bordiau wing, Quenast Columns and frontmost fountain.)

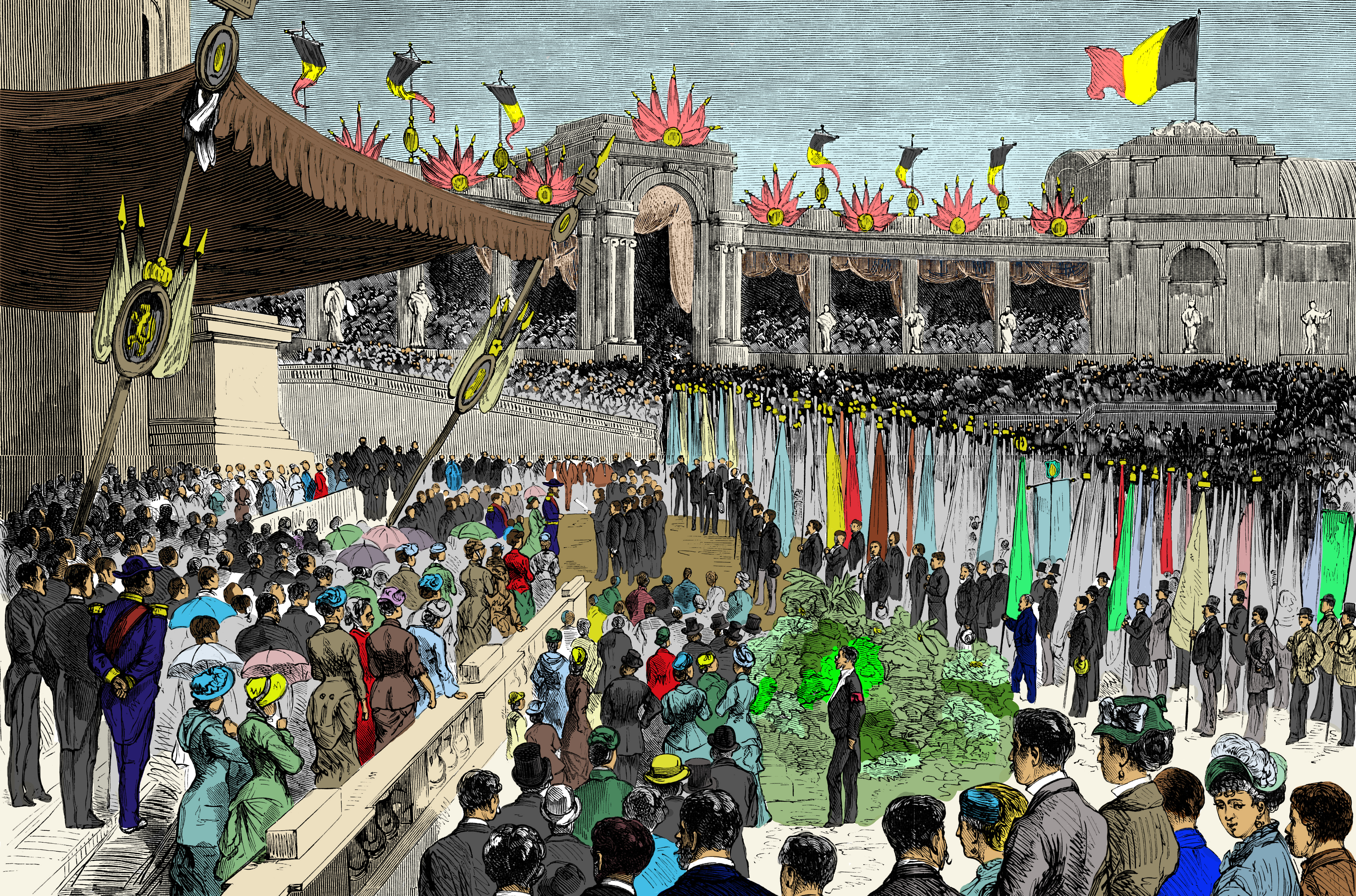
The patriotic celebration of the 50th anniversary of Belgian independence, Cinquantenaire Park, 16 August 1880

The Cinquantenaire Arcade (French: Arcade(s) du Cinquantenaire, Dutch: Arcade(s) van het Jubelpark) was planned for the 1880 exhibition and was meant to commemorate the anniversary. In 1880, only the bases of the memorial arch's columns were completed, and during the exhibition, the rest of the arch was constructed from wooden panels. In the following years, the monument's completion was the topic of a continuous battle between King Leopold II and the Belgian government, which did not want to spend the money required to complete it. The park was also one of the sites of the Brussels International Exposition of 1897, for which the existing buildings' wings were extended, although the arch was still incomplete.

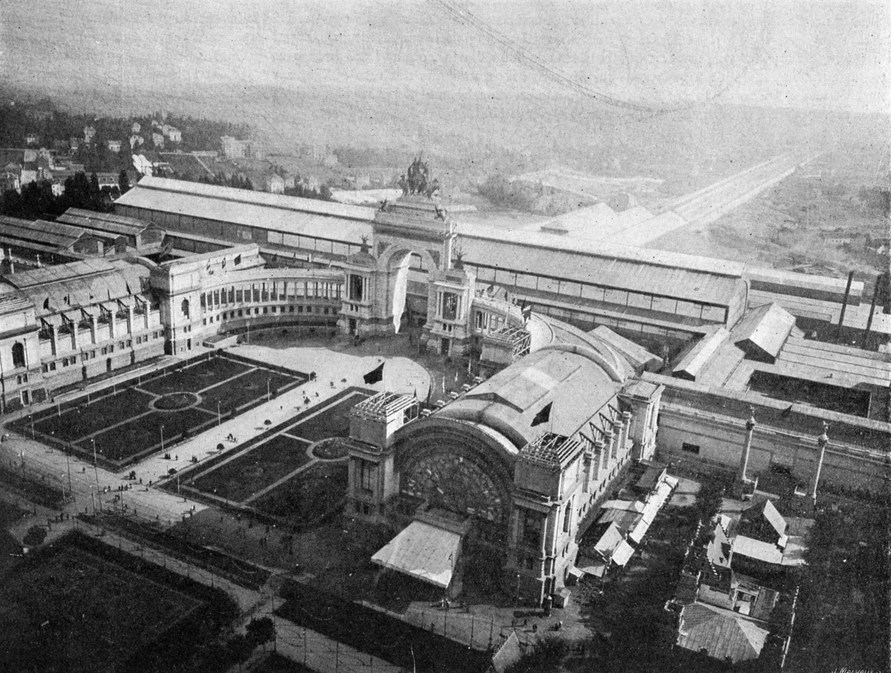
View of the Cinquantenaire during the 1897 International Exposition

The original architect was Gédéon Bordiau, who spent close to twenty years on the project. The structures were built in iron, glass and stone, symbolising Belgium's economic and industrial performance. The construction of buildings was put on hold in 1890 for lack of funds, and was eventually stopped by the architect's death in 1904. His successor, chosen by Leopold II, was the French architect Charles Girault. Girault changed the design from a single to a triple arch, and began a course of round-the-clock construction in a final push to complete it.

The original pavilions of the 1880 exhibition, designed by Bordiau, were largely replaced with the arcade designed by Girault in 1904 and the large halls on both sides. Only the glass-constructed Bordiau halls remain from the 1880 structures. The monument was completed with private funding in May 1905 and the arcade was inaugurated by Leopold II on 27 September 1905, just in time for the 75th anniversary of Belgian independence. The triumphal arch that had already been planned was amended and expanded to meet the king's wishes.

A fire destroyed the south wing of the complex in 1946, part of the Royal Museums of Art and History (RMAH). The collection pieces were saved, and the burnt wing has since been rebuilt. As for the north wing, home to the Royal Museum of the Armed Forces and Military History, it was spared.

== Current tenants and usage ==
Nowadays, the various buildings of the Cinquantenaire complex host three museums: the Royal Museum of the Armed Forces and of Military History, which has been the sole tenant of the northern half of the complex since 1880; the Art & History Museum (formerly called the Cinquantenaire Museum), which has occupied its southern half since 1889; and Autoworld automobile museum. In addition, the north-western corner of the park is the location of the Great Mosque of Brussels (1978), as well as two monuments: the Pavilion of Human Passions (1896), and the Monument to the Belgian Pioneers in Congo (1921).

The surrounding park esplanade has been used for several purposes, such as military parades and drive-in movies in the summer, as well as a filming location for films and music videos. It is also the starting point for the 20 km of Brussels, an annual run with 30,000 participants.

=== Cinquantenaire Arcade ===
The Cinquantenaire Arcade (French: Arcade(s) du Cinquantenaire, Dutch: Arcade(s) van het Jubelpark) is a memorial arcade in the centre of the Parc du Cinquantenaire. The centrepiece is a monumental triple arch known as the Cinquantenaire Arch (French: Arc du Cinquantenaire, Dutch: Triomfboog van het Jubelpark). It is topped by a bronze quadriga sculptural group with a female charioteer, entitled Brabant Raising the National Flag, by Jules Lagae and Thomas Vincotte. The other sculptures include personifications of Belgian Provinces (Brabant being represented by the quadriga): Hainaut and Limburg by Albert Desenfans, Antwerp and Liège by Charles van der Stappen, East Flanders and West Flanders by Jef Lambeaux, and Namur and Luxembourg by Guillaume de Groot.

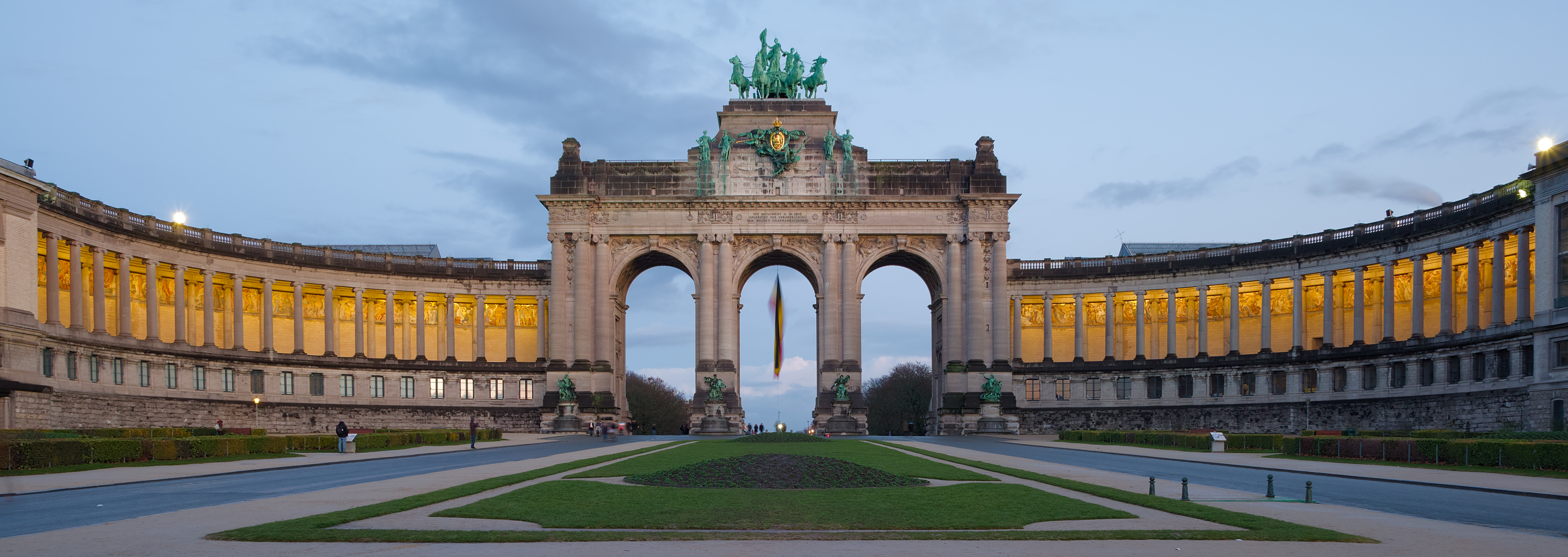
Panoramic view of the Cinquantenaire Arcade. The Cinquantenaire Arch was completed in 1905, replacing a previous temporary version of the arcade.

=== Military Museum ===
The Royal Museum of the Armed Forces and Military History is a military museum that occupies the two northernmost halls of the historic complex. The museum's collection originally consisted of approximately 900 pieces collected by the officer Louis Leconte following World War I. Leconte collected considerable equipment abandoned by the Germans in 1918. The museum was originally installed on the site of La Cambre Abbey and moved to the Cinquantenaire Park in 1923. The collection was later heavily enriched by legacies, gifts and exchanges. Nowadays, the museum displays uniforms, weapons, vehicles and military equipment of all ages and all countries.

The north wing, built by Gédéon Bordiau, has been occupied by the Aviation Hall since 1972, when the Air and Space gallery was inaugurated. The collection includes various types of aircraft, both military and civilian, some dating back to the early 20th century. It includes surviving WWI aircraft like the Nieuport 17 and Sopwith Camel, whilst the most recent additions include an F-16 Fighting Falcon and Westland Sea King. The collection as a whole is one of the largest in the world.

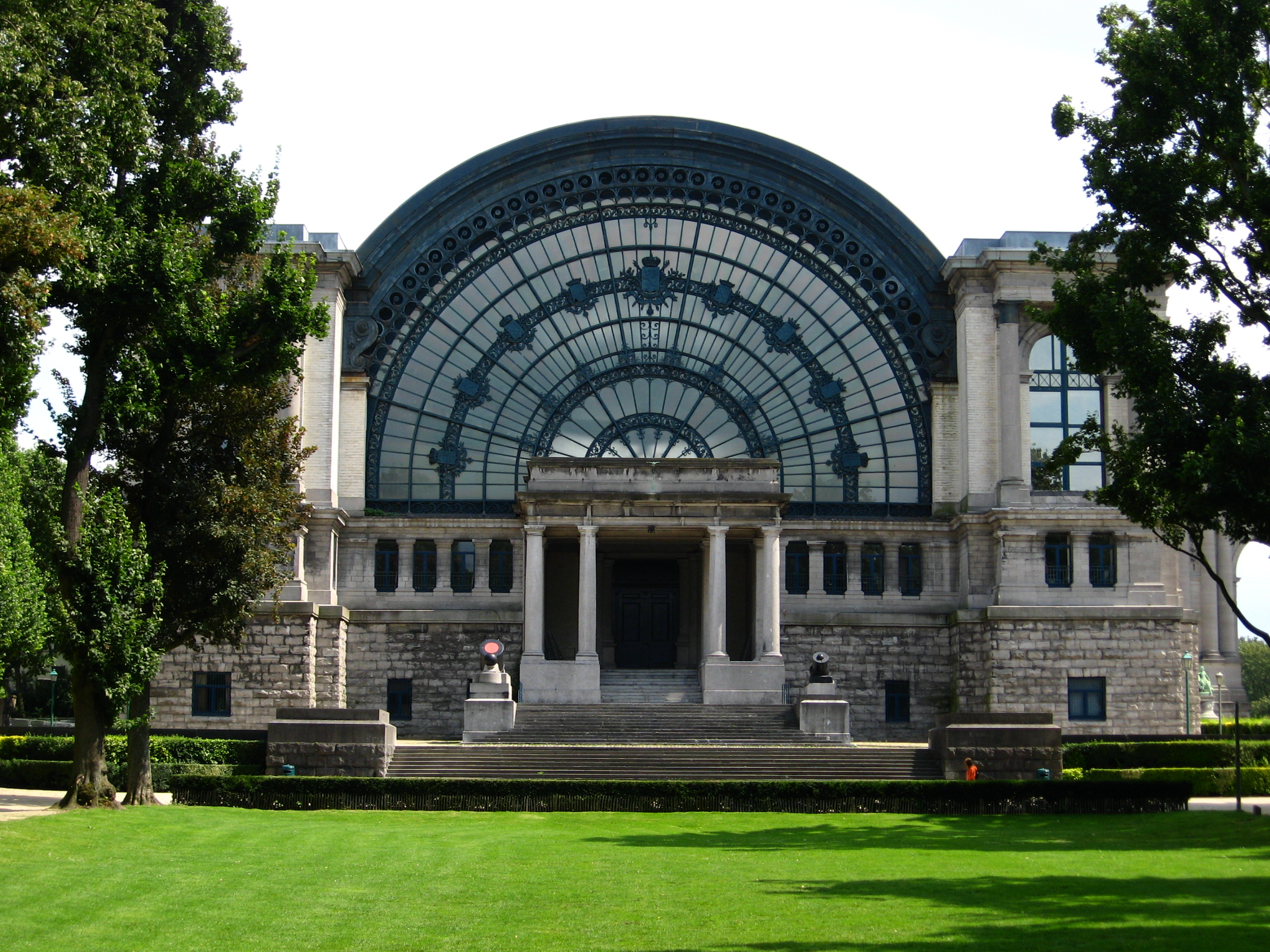
Entrance to the Military Museum in the northern Bordiau Hall

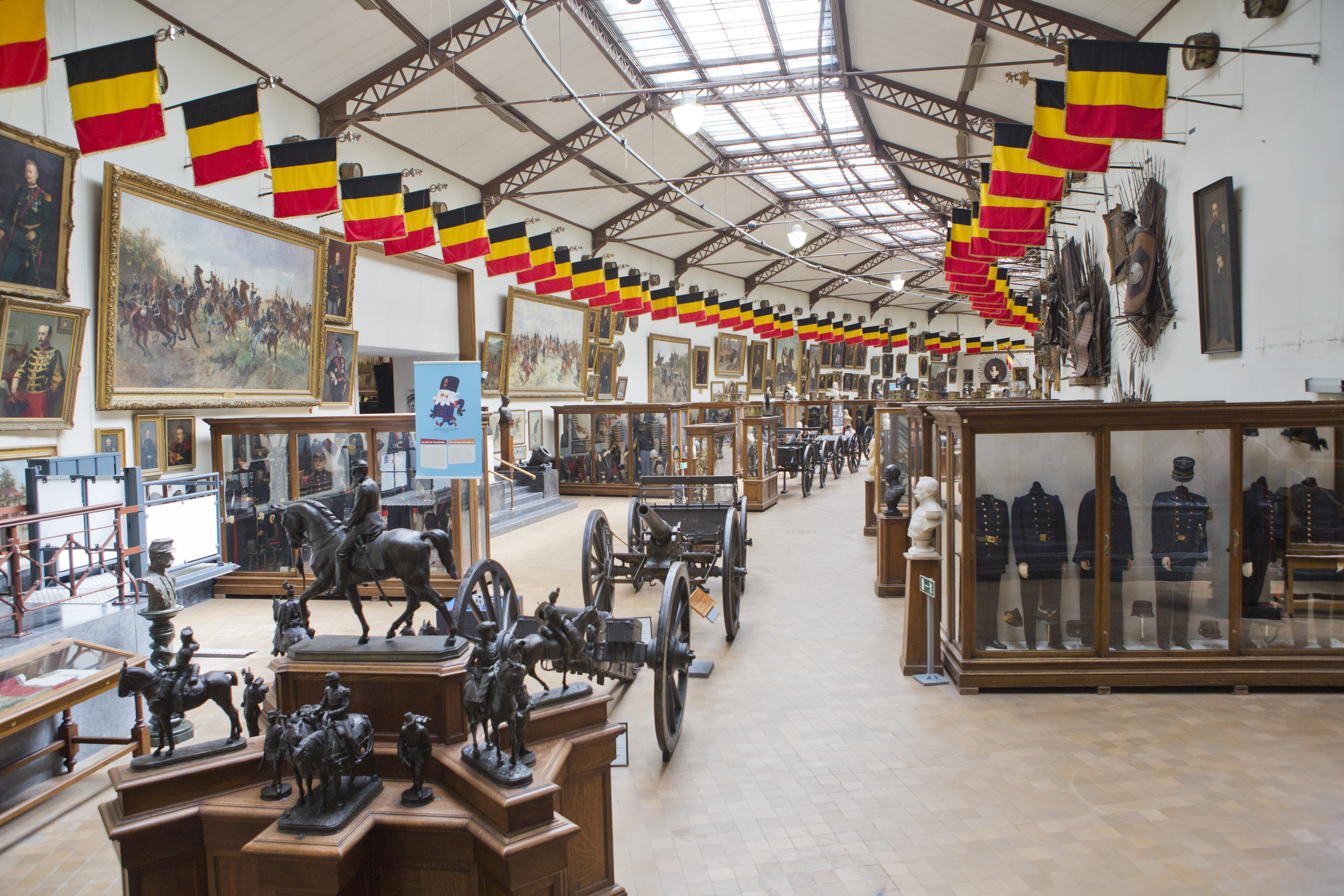
Main gallery, with the collection of Belgian 19th-century militaria

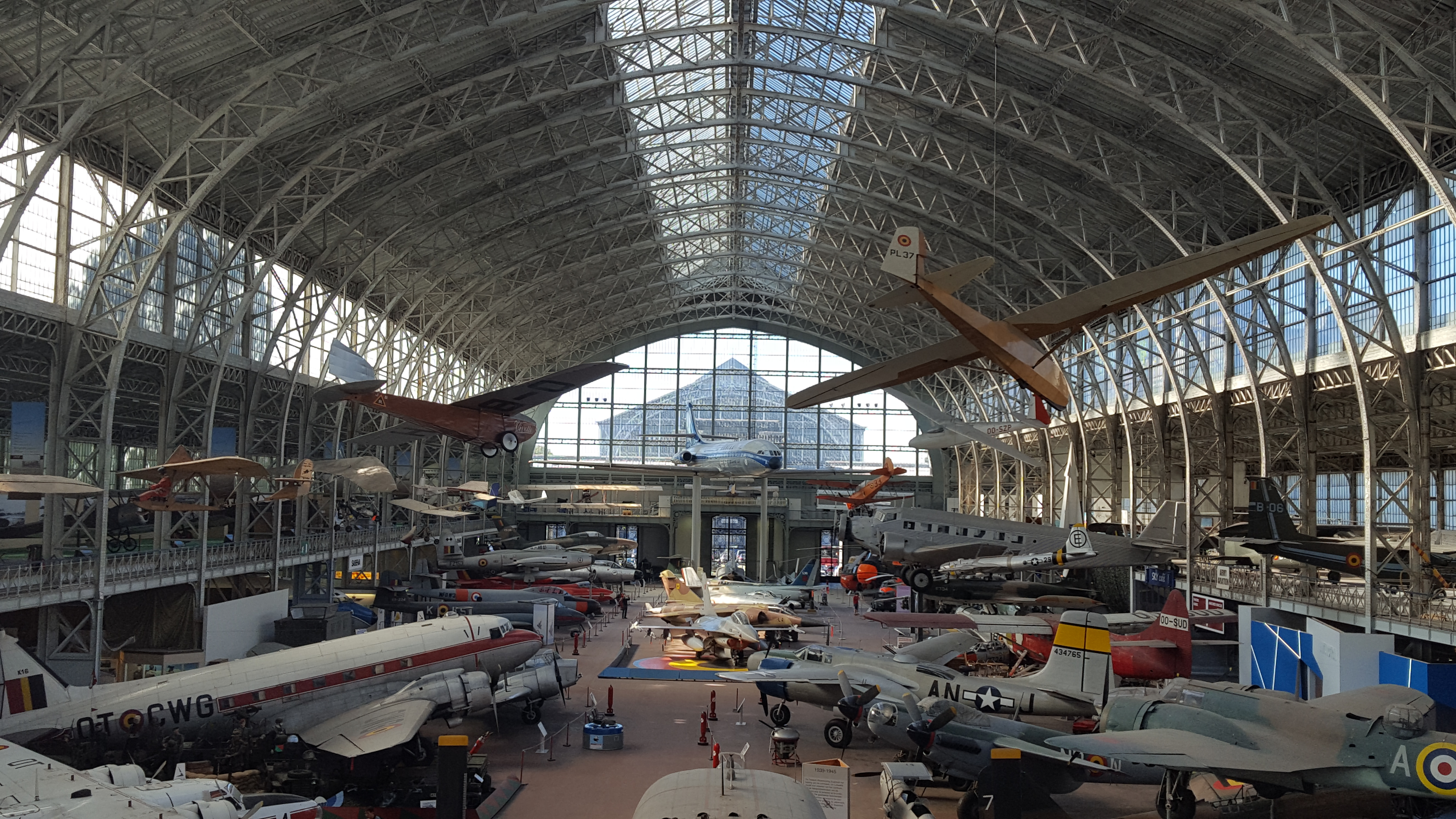
View of the aviation section in the North Hall

=== Art & History Museum ===
The Art & History Museum is a museum of antiquities and ethnographic and decorative arts that occupies most of the southern part of the complex. It is one of the constituents of the Royal Museums for Art and History (RMAH), which itself is part of the Belgian federal institute of the Belgian Federal Science Policy Office (BELSPO), and is one of the largest art museums in Europe.

The museum consists of several parts, including a national collection of artefacts from prehistory to the Merovingian period (c. 751 AD), as well as from classical antiquity of the Near East, Egypt, Greece and Rome. Artefacts from non-European civilisations, such as China, Japan, Korea, pre-Columbian America, and the Islamic world, are also on display. Additionally, a collection of European decorative arts includes pieces from the Middle Ages to the 20th century, such as sculptures, furniture, tapestries, textiles, costumes, old vehicles, etc.

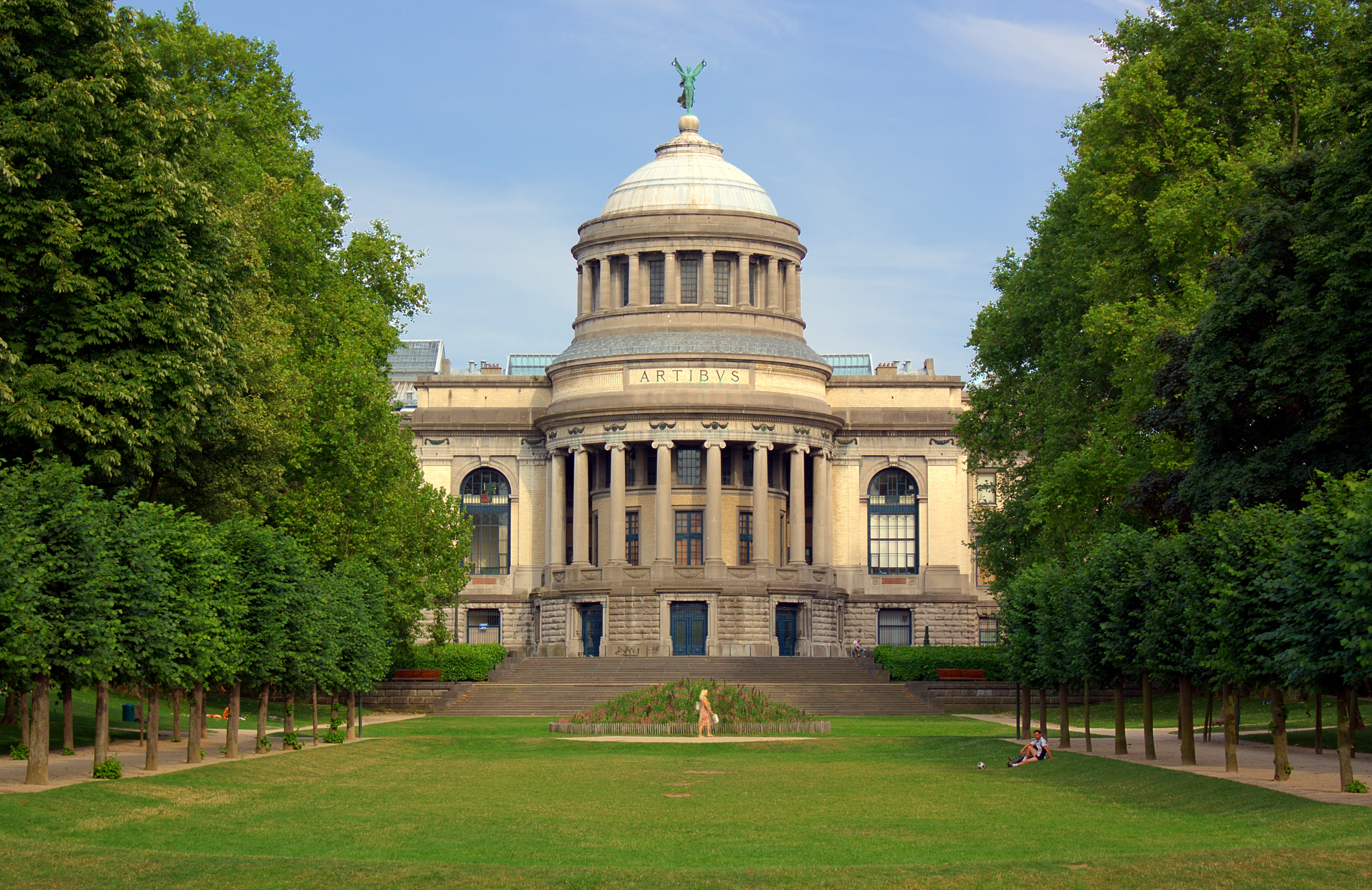
The Art & History Museum's dome in the south-western part of the complex

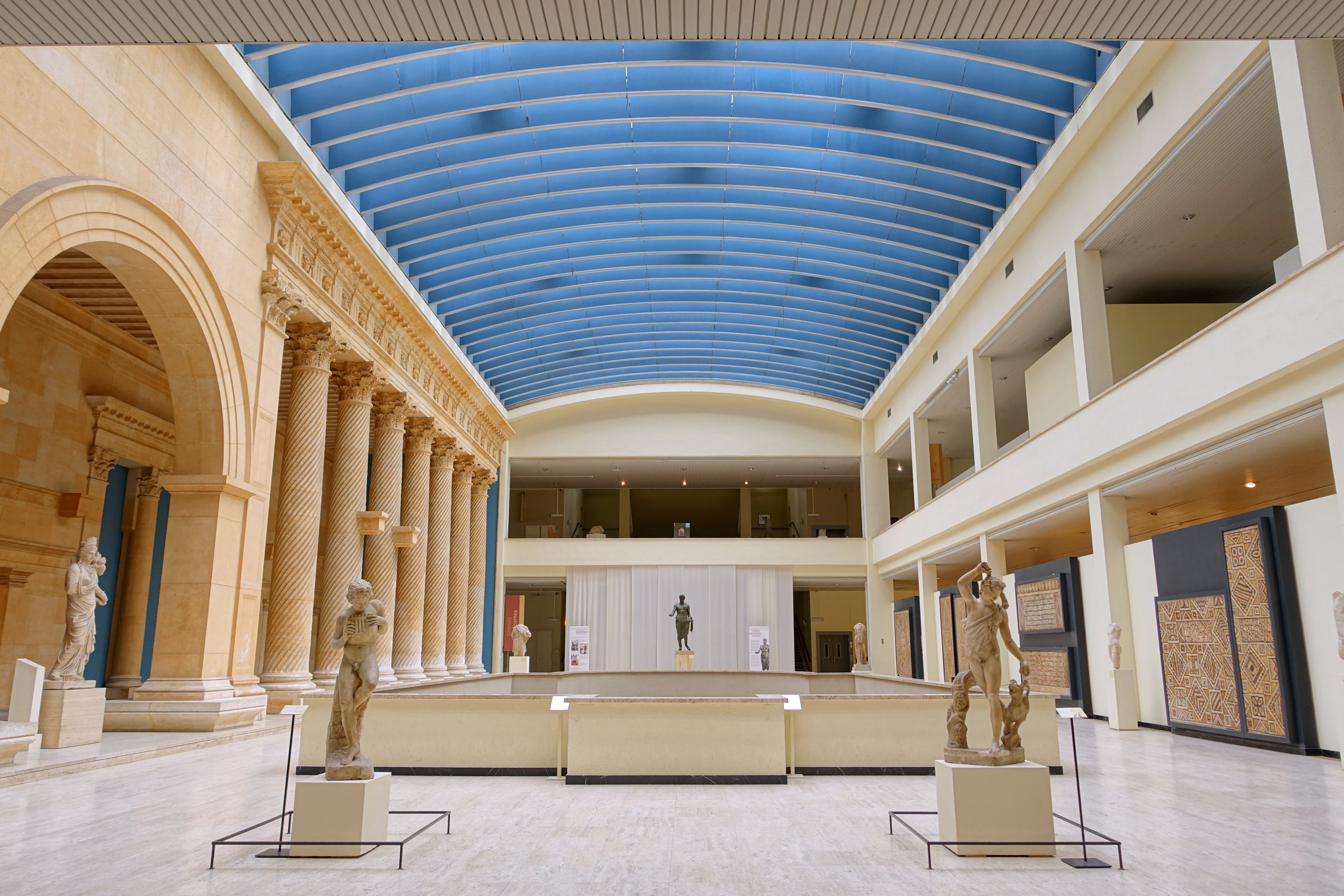
Classical antiquity collection

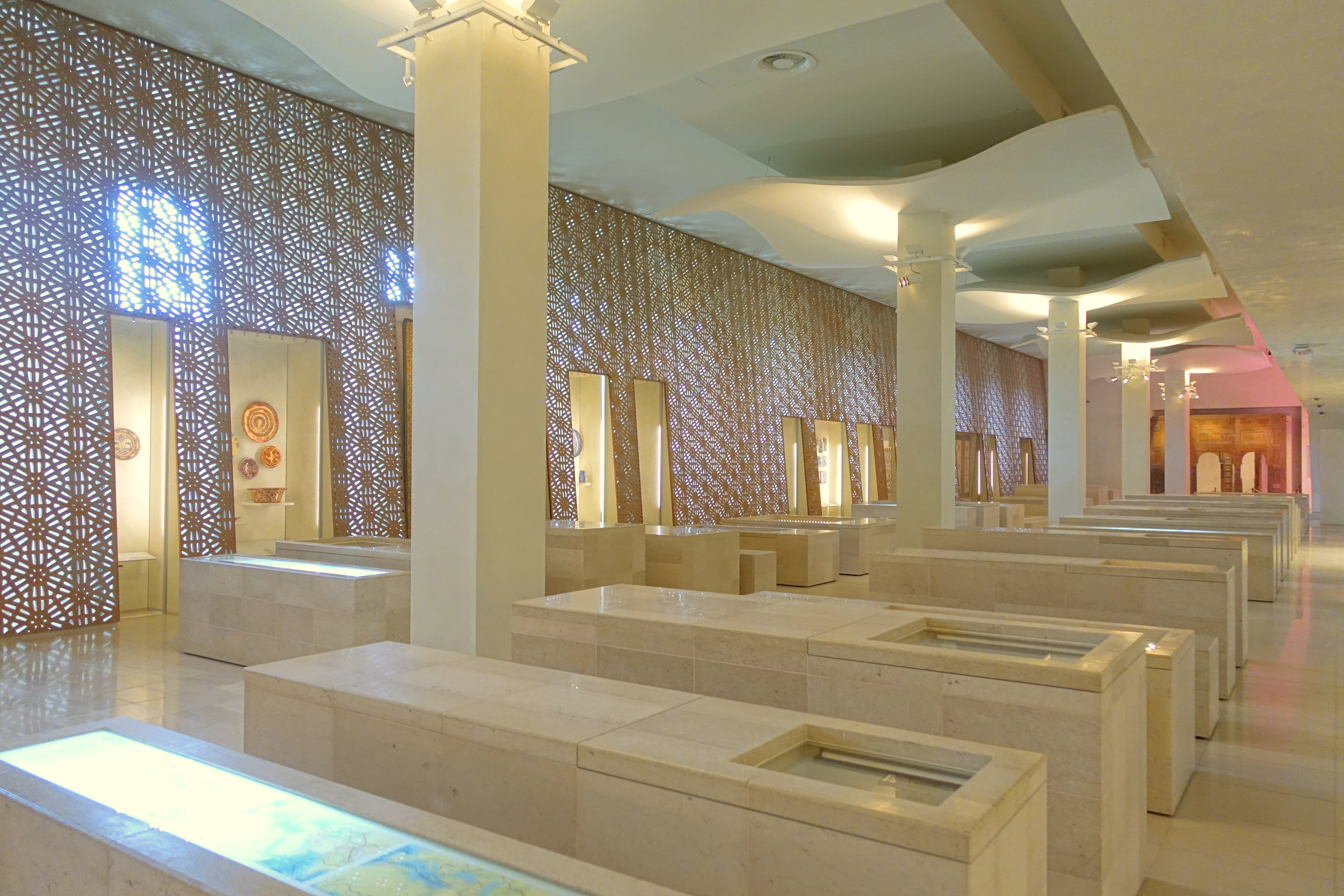
Islamic art collection

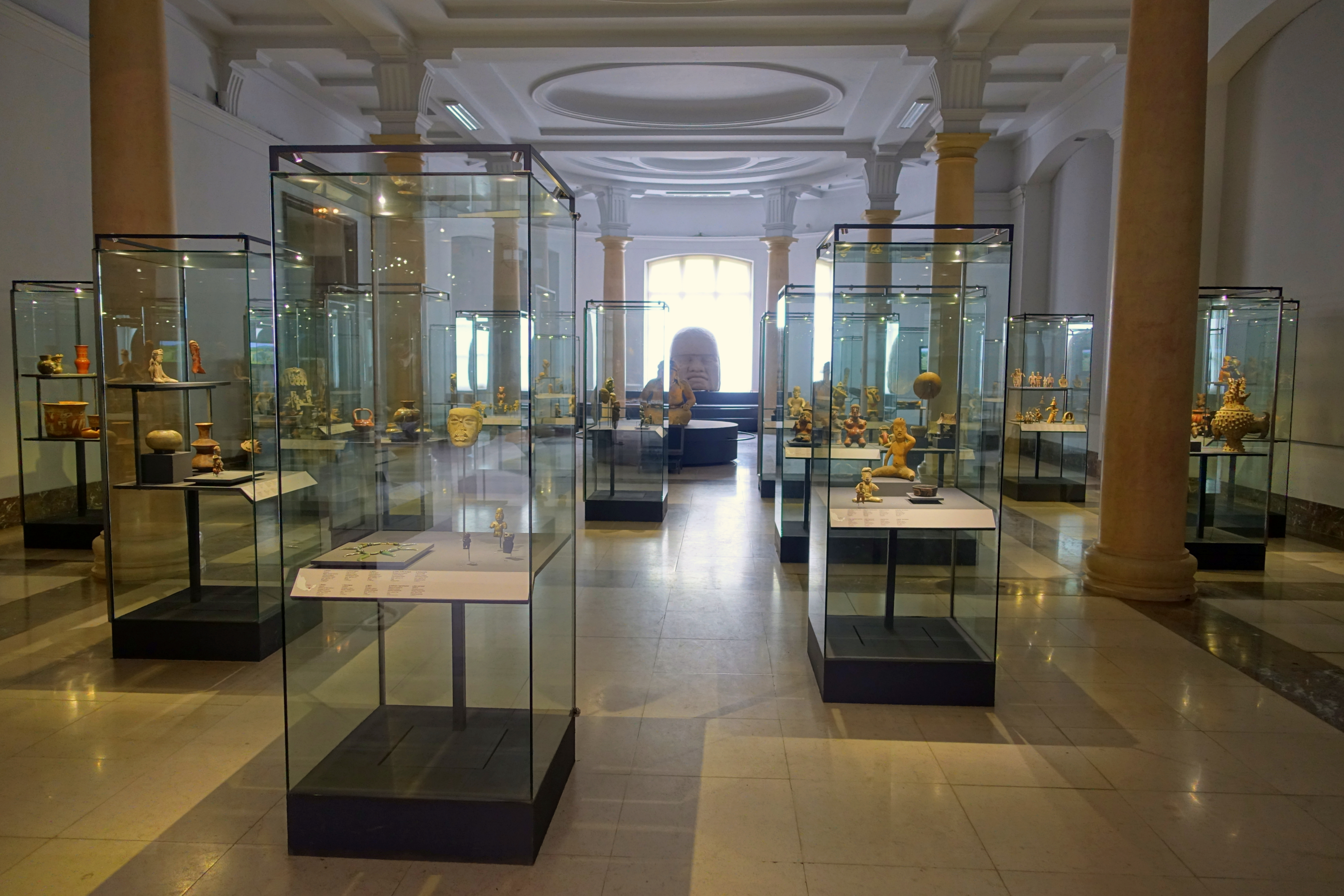
American collection

=== Autoworld ===
Autoworld is an automobile museum occupying the South Hall of the complex. It displays a large and varied collection of over 300 vehicles, including cars and motorcycles from various eras, retracing the history of the industry from its birth in the 19th century to the modern age. These include Minervas, a 1928 Bentley, a 1930 Bugatti and a 1930 Cord, and several limousines belonging to the Belgian royal family.

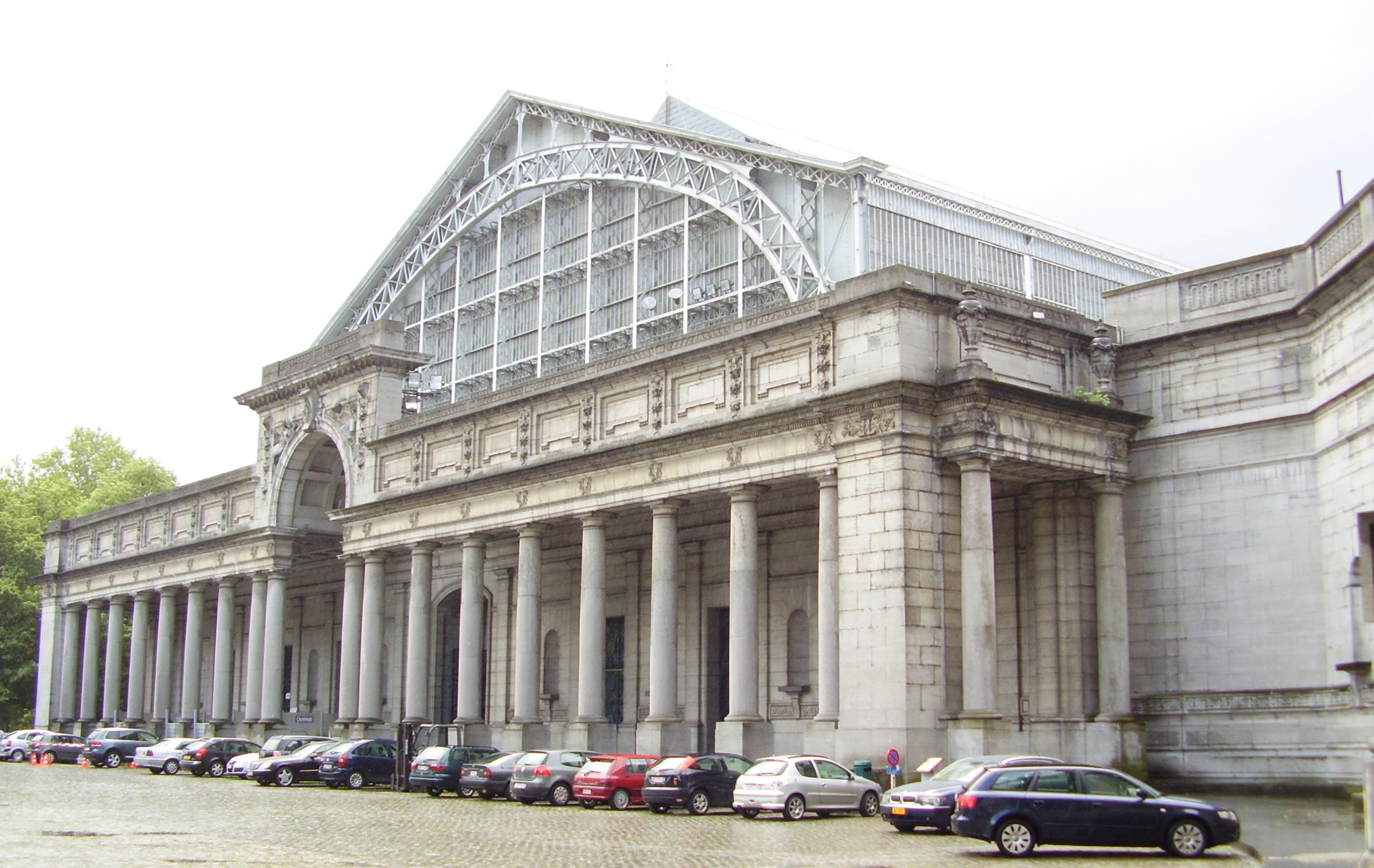
Entrance to the Palais Mondial (South Hall), housing Autoworld

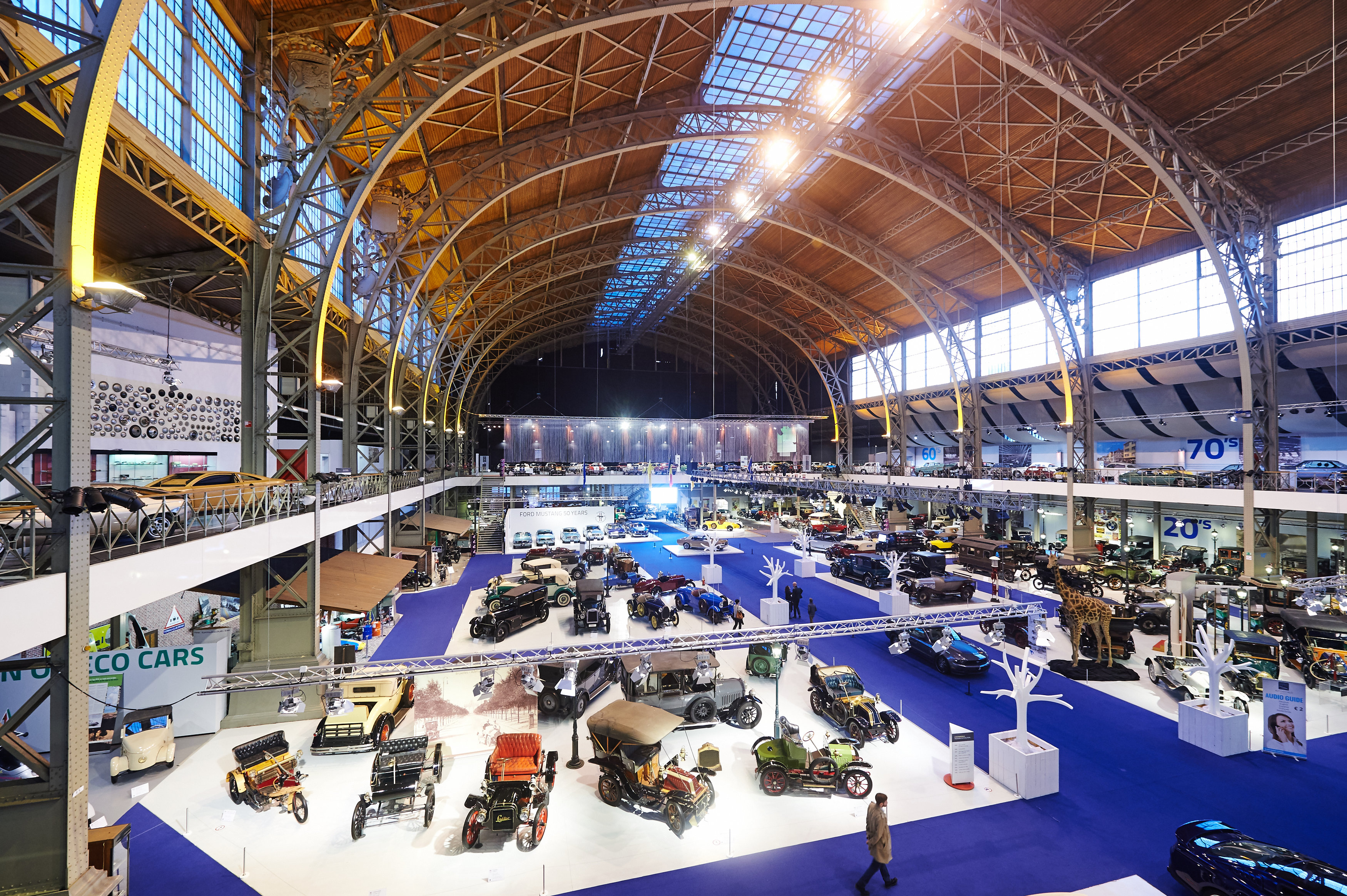
View of Autoworld's collection in the South Hall

=== Great Mosque of Brussels ===
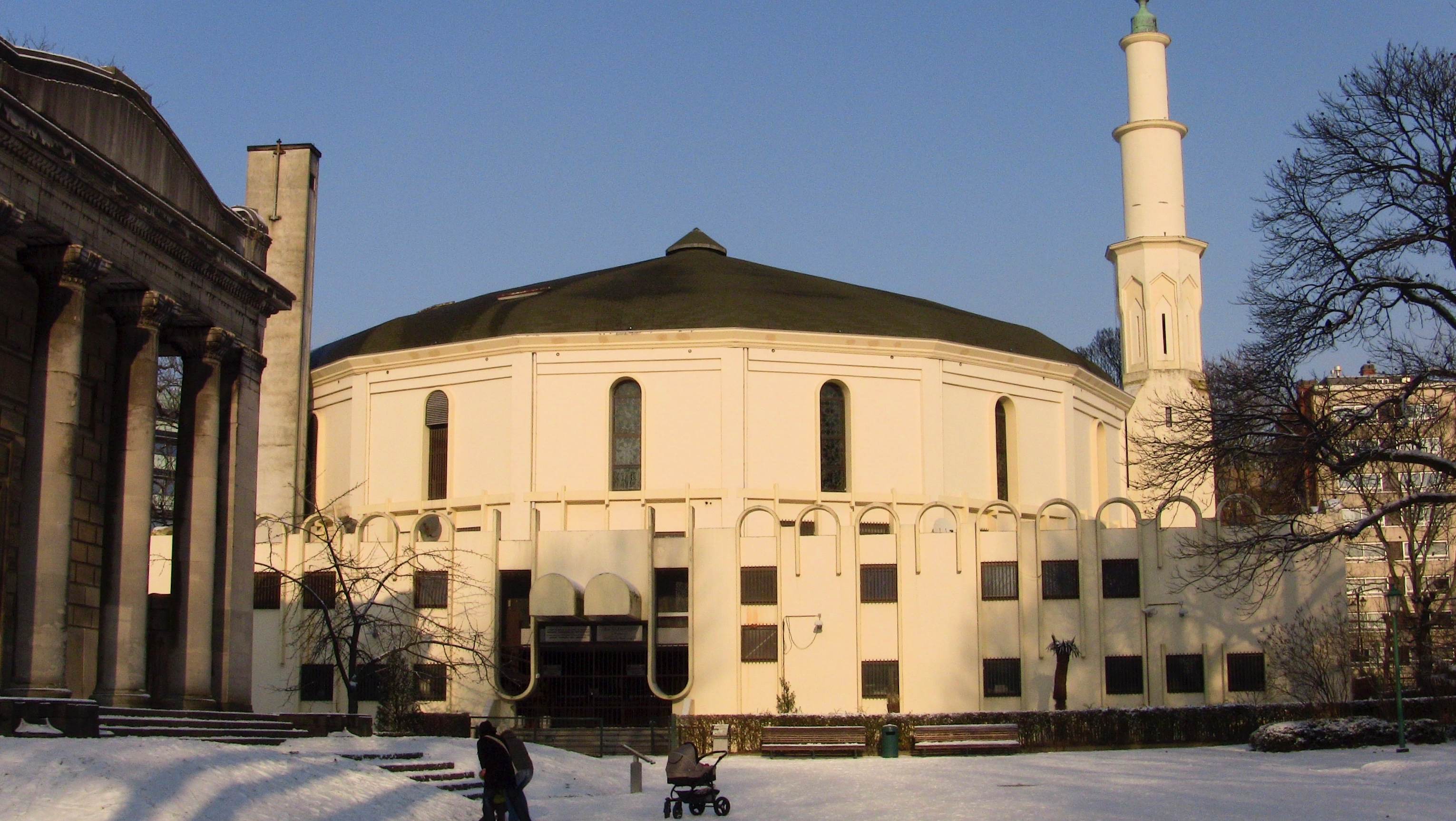
The Great Mosque of Brussels, former seat of the Islamic and Cultural Centre of Belgium

The Great Mosque of Brussels is located in the north-western corner of the park. It is the oldest mosque in Brussels, and is the former seat of the Islamic and Cultural Centre of Belgium. The latter operates a school and an Islamic research centre. The centre provides courses of Arabic to adults and children, as well as initiations to Islam.

The original building was erected by the architect Ernest Van Humbeeck in a neo-Moorish style, to form the Oriental Pavilion of the National Exhibition. For the exhibition, the pavilion housed a monumental painting on canvas, Panorama of Cairo, which enjoyed major success. Insufficient funds for maintenance during the period of the world wars caused the building to gradually deteriorate.

In 1967, during an official visit to Belgium from King Faisal of Saudi Arabia, King Baudouin decided to turn the building into a place of worship. The mosque, designed by the Tunisian architect Mongi Boubaker, was inaugurated in 1978 in the presence of Khalid ibn Abd al-Aziz and Baudouin.

=== Pavilion of Human Passions ===
The Cinquantenaire Park is the location of the Pavilion of Human Passions, also known as the Horta-Lambeaux Pavilion, a neoclassical pavilion in the form of a Greek temple, built by the architect Victor Horta in 1891–1897. Although classical in appearance, the building shows the first steps of the young Horta towards Art Nouveau. It was designed to serve as a permanent showcase for The Human Passions, a monumental marble relief by the sculptor Jef Lambeaux. Since its completion, the building has remained almost permanently closed. Since 2014, it has periodically reopened to the public.

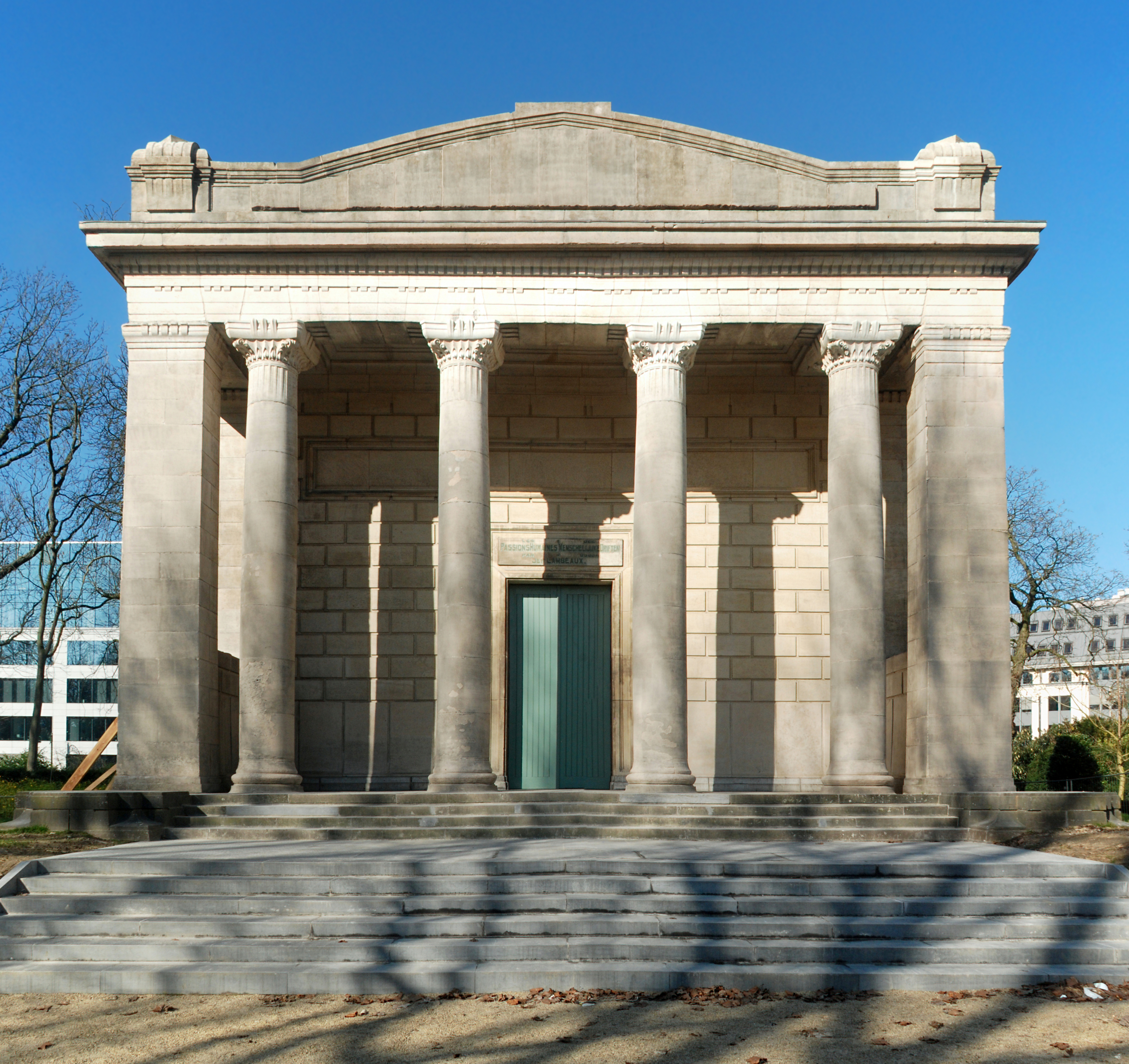
Pavilion of Human Passions

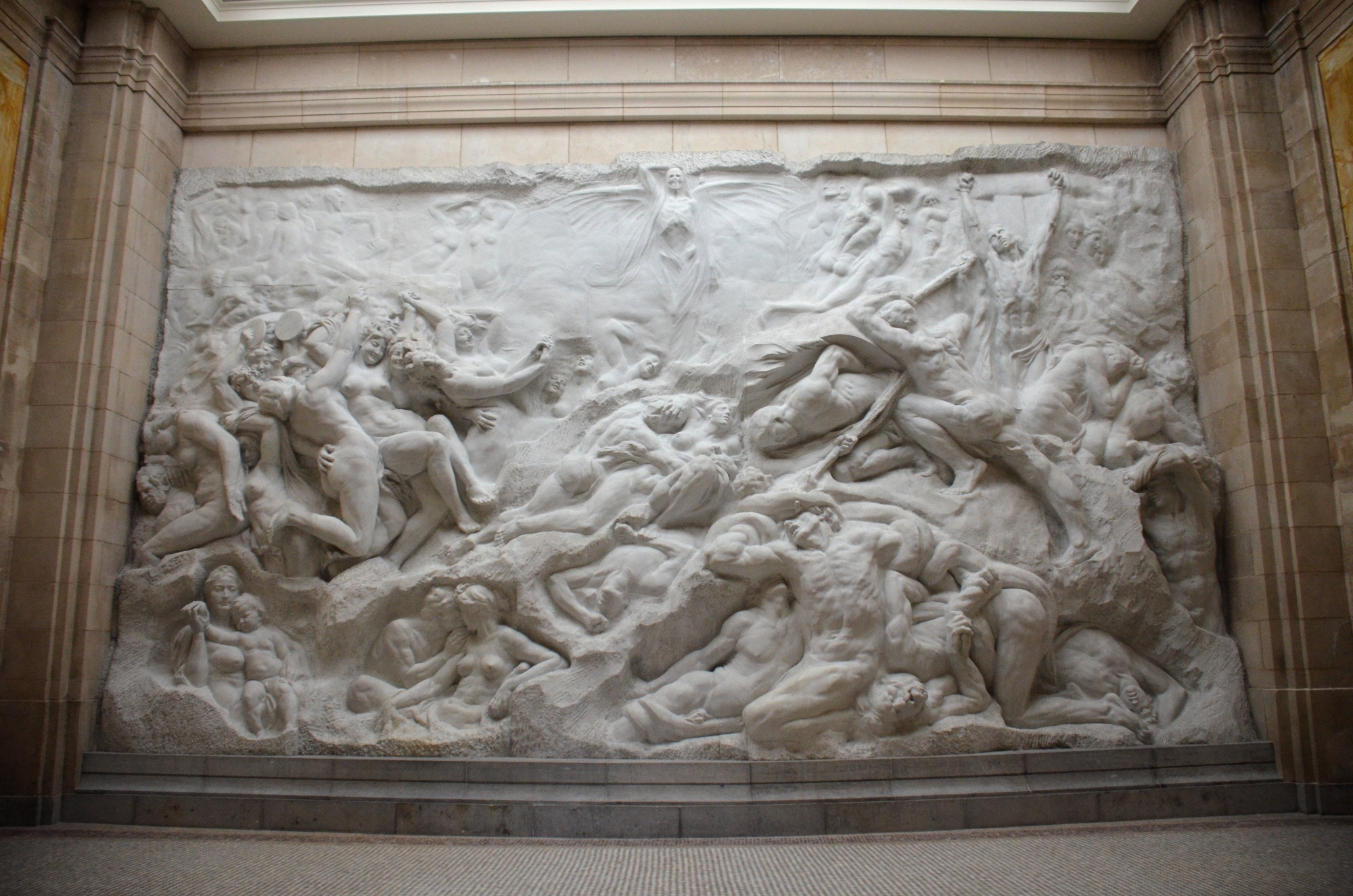
Detail of the relief made by Jef Lambeaux

=== Monument to the Belgian Pioneers ===
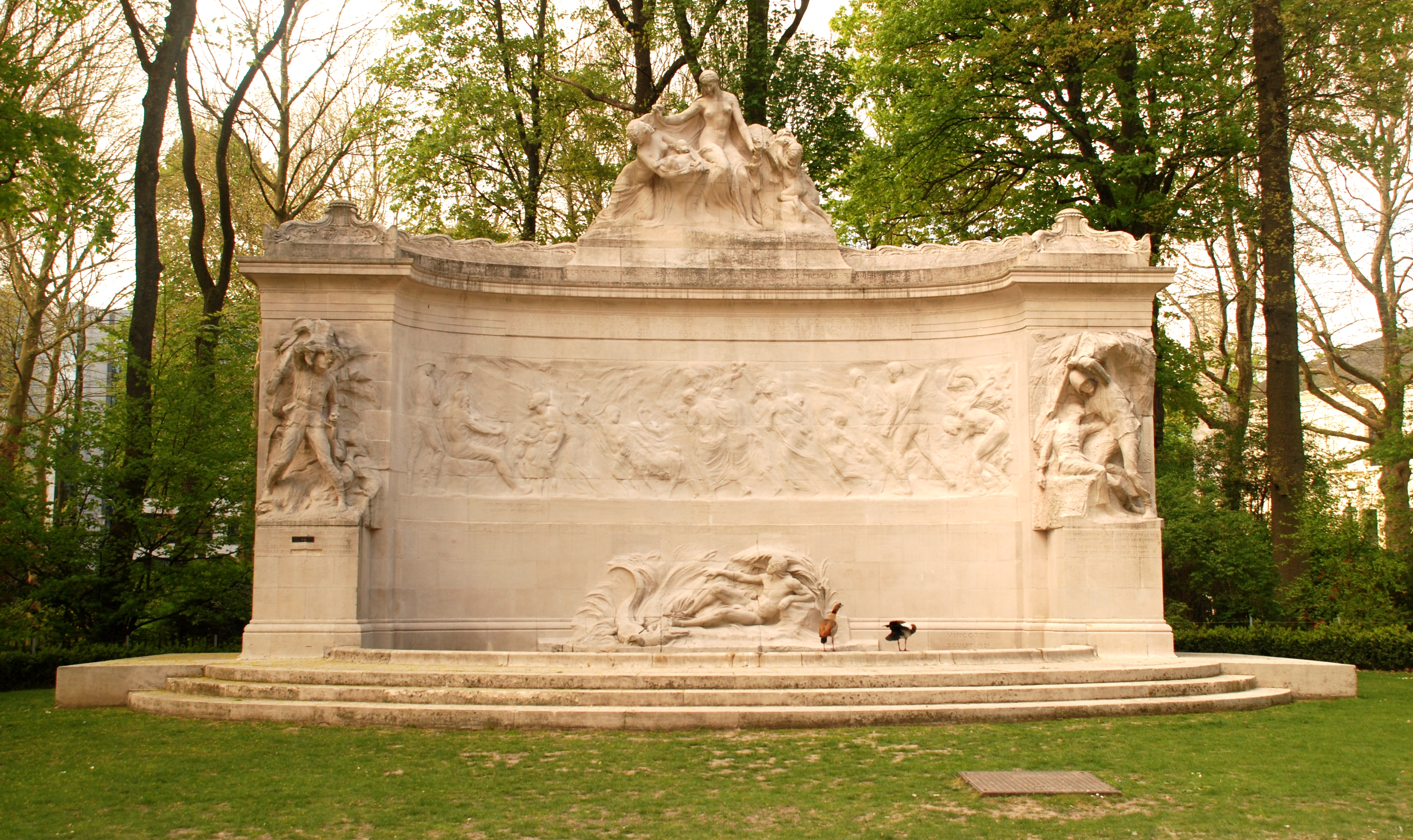
Monument to the Belgian Pioneers in Congo

In the Cinquantenaire Park also stands the Monument to the Belgian Pioneers in Congo, designed by Thomas Vinçotte in 1912–1921, and honouring the Belgian colonial efforts in the former Belgian Congo. Partly due to the proximity of the Great Mosque of Brussels, an inscription regarding the Arab slave trade is the subject of ongoing controversy.

== Map ==
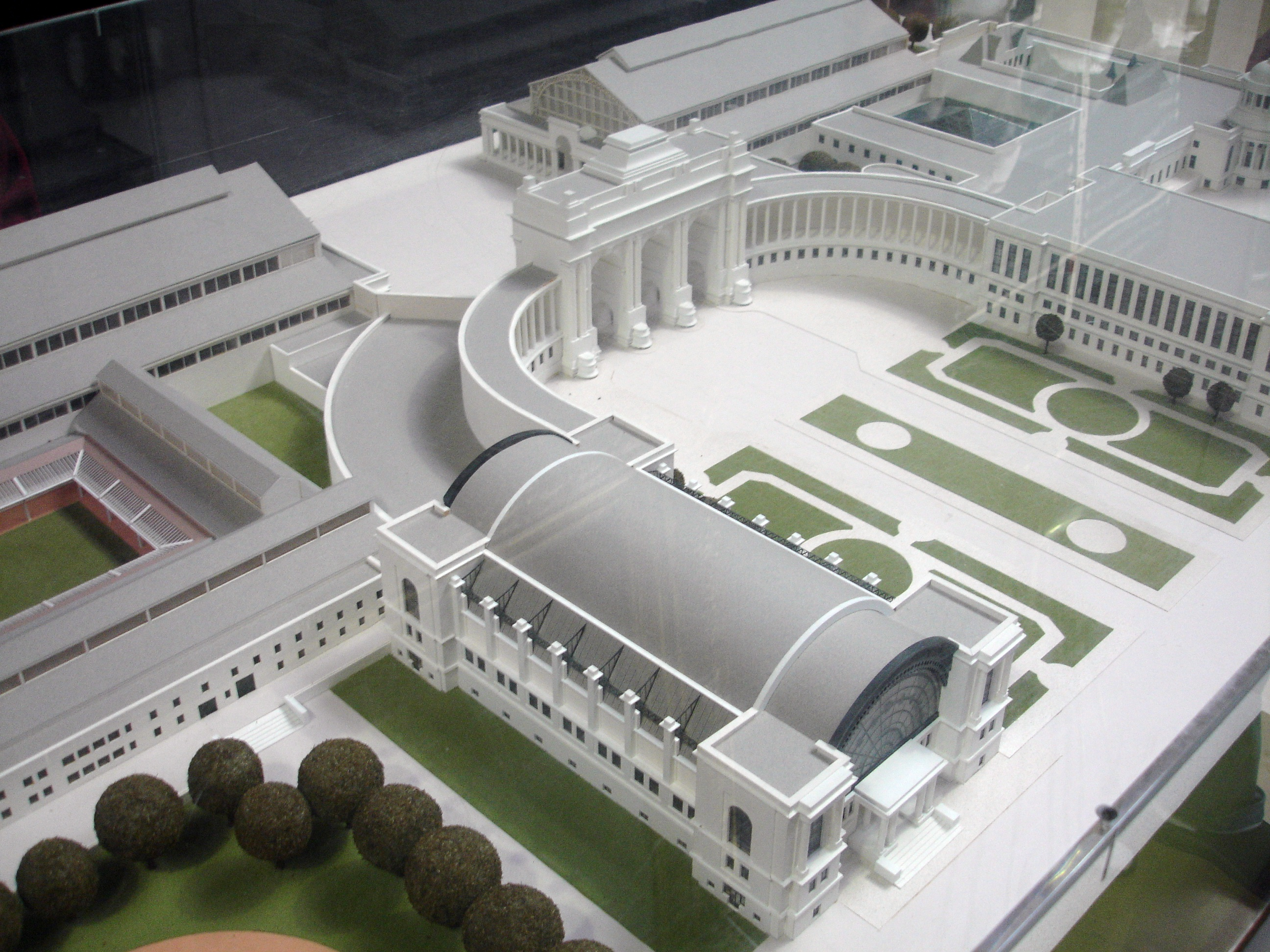
A maquette of the Cinquantenaire complex

== Plans ==
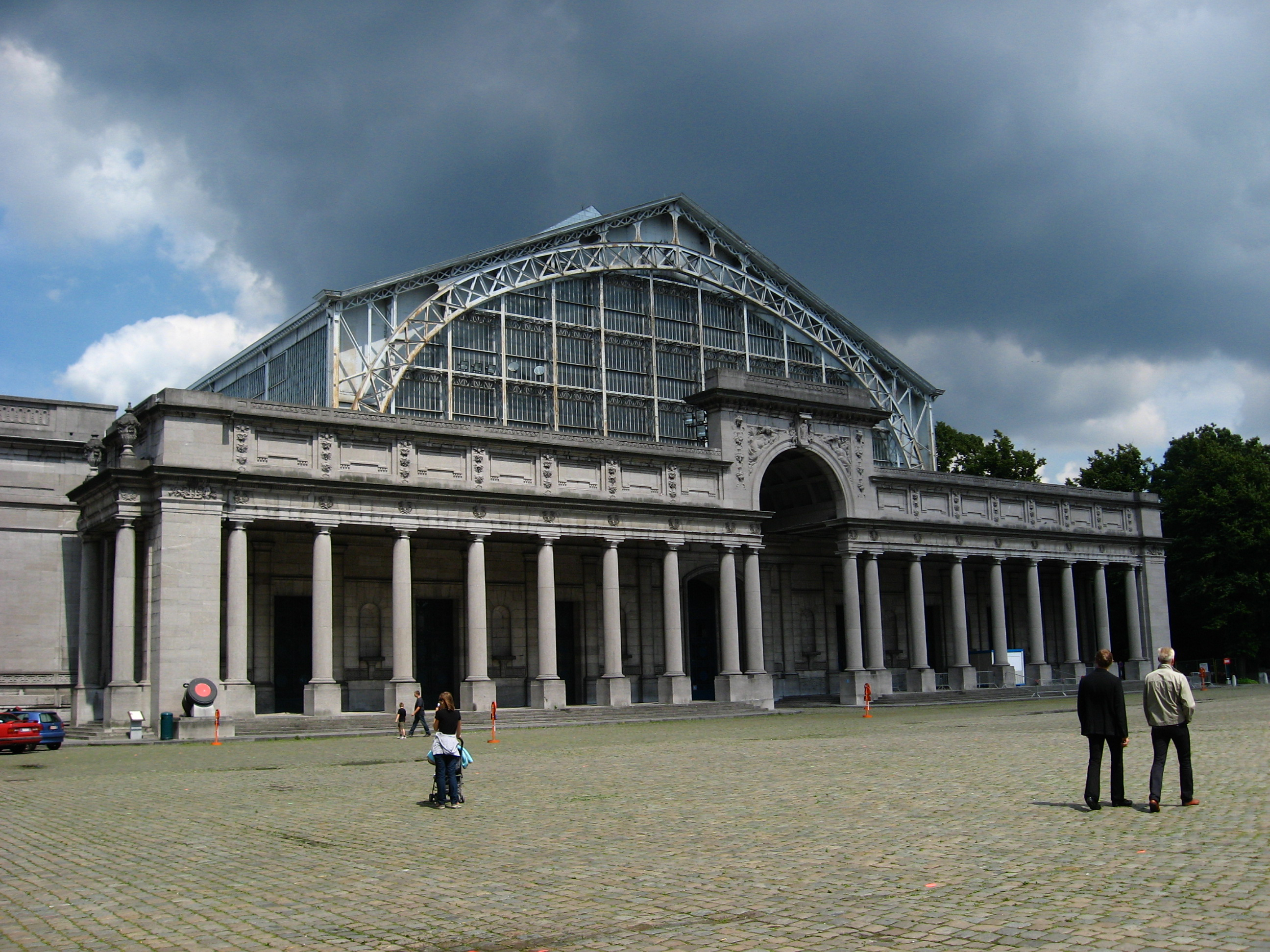
The Cinquantenaire is envisioned as "Europeanised", and its North Hall (pictured) could possibly be turned into a major "socio-cultural facility".

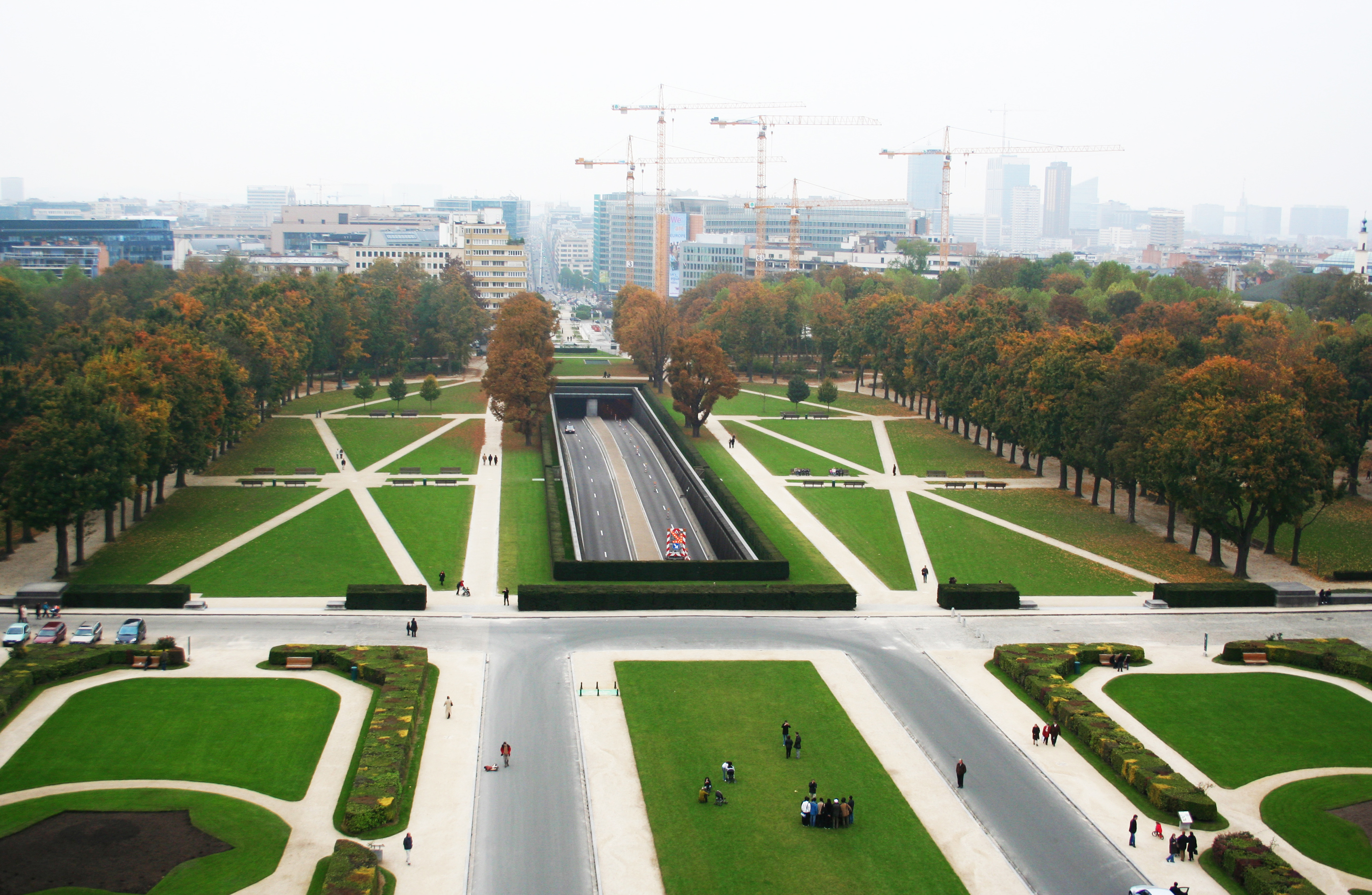
The esplanade in front of the arch. In the plans mentioned in this section, the Belliard Tunnel would be enclosed.

In September 2007, then-European Commissioner for Administrative Affairs, Siim Kallas, together with then-Minister-President of the Brussels-Capital Region, Charles Picqué, unveiled plans for rebuilding the European district. They included "Europeanising" parts of the Cinquantenaire complex, and installing a major "socio-cultural facility" in the North Hall, enabled to hold "major congresses and, perhaps, European Summits, events, exhibitions", after moving the Aerospace Museum out to Tour & Taxis in the north-west of the city. The Cinquantenaire would under the plans become one of three European pedestrian squares, being the one for events and festivities.

Other plans were announced in 2022 to renovate the Parc du Cinquantenaire including the archway as part of a project called "Cinquantenaire Bicentenaire" for the 200th anniversary of Belgium's independence.

== See also ==
- Brussels and the European Union
- Mundaneum (of Otlet; originated there after World War I)
- History of Brussels
- Culture of Belgium
- Belgium in the long nineteenth century
