= Jean Gedeon =

Jean Gedeon (born 1946) was the artistic director of the Pittsburgh Youth Ballet. She founded the Pittsburgh Youth Ballet School in 1983, and established The Pittsburgh Youth Ballet Company (PYBC) in 1990. A former dance soloist with the Pittsburgh Ballet Theatre, she studied with Frano Jelencic, Duncan Noble, Frederick Franklin, Nicolas Petrov, Leonide Massine, and Edward Caton. She taught for twenty-five years at Carnegie Institute, Carlow College, and Point Park College after a severe foot injury halted her career with the Pittsburgh Ballet Theatre.

She was featured in a two-year running, weekly television series on PBS. She served as the children's ballet mistress during the Pittsburgh Opera Theatre's month-long tour of Germany and Switzerland as well as Pittsburgh Youth Ballet's two European tours through Austria, Italy and Germany, performing in the Tanzsommer Festivals. She appeared in and directed students in an award-winning commercial for PNC Bank. She has been featured in the September 2000 Edition of Dance Magazine and the January and February 2001 Issues of Dance Teacher Magazine. The local NBC affiliate, WPXI, featured Mrs. Gedeon describing her teaching philosophy and the success of the school and the company on their "Talking Pittsburgh" radio show. Mrs. Gedeon has been awarded the 2003 "Best Artist/Teacher of the Year" award by the Chautauqua Institute and "Best Dance Teacher Award" from Dance Teacher Magazine (September Issue, 2003). She brought the PYBC into national prominence as an "Honor Company" at Regional Dance America. She was awarded in Pittsburgh Magazine as an "Artist to Watch" receiving the Harry Schwalb Excellence in the Arts Award.
