= Gédéon Foulquier =

French entomologist (1855–1941)

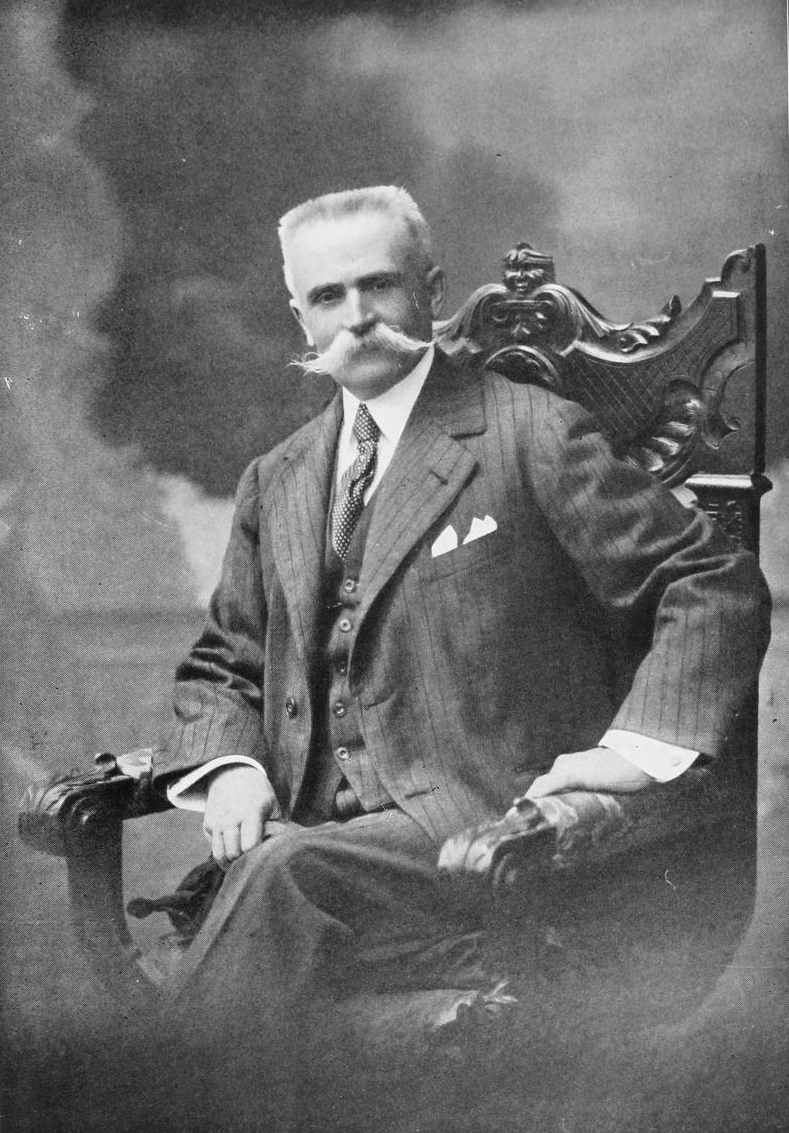
Gedeon Foulquier

Gédéon Auguste Foulquier (8 August 1855 – 1941), was a French entomologist who specialised in Lepidoptera. He wrote with Charles Oberthür Catalogue raisonné des Lepidoptères des Bouches-du-Rhône (principalement des environs de Marseille et d'Aix). Premier partie, Rhopalocères. Marseille : Librairie Ruat, 1899.

Gédéon Foulquier was born in Pamiers, Gard, the son of Auguste Foulguier and Émilie Puechmary. He lived in Marseille. His collection is held by Musée Pyrénéen in Lourdes.
