= Pittsburgh Youth Ballet =

American non-profit dance organization

Coordinates: 40.28937°N 80.10395°W

Pittsburgh Youth Ballet is an American non-profit organization previously run by former Pittsburgh Ballet Theater ballerina Jean Gedeon. The School was founded in 1983, while the company was established in 1990. PYB alumnae have performed with the New York City Ballet and other professional dance companies.

In 2019, the Youth Pittsburgh Ballet changed its name to Texture Ballet School and is under the direction of Alan Obuzor.
