= Gédéon Bordiau =

Belgian architect

- Born: 2 February 1832; Neufvilles, Belgium
- Died: 23 January 1904 (aged 71); Brussels, Belgium
- Occupation: Architect

Gédéon-Nicolas-Joseph Bordiau (French pronunciation: [ʒedeɔ̃ nikɔla ʒozɛf bɔʁdjo]; 2 February 1832 – 23 January 1904) was a Belgian architect, active in the second half of the nineteenth century. His work includes the plans for the Cinquantenaire exhibition parc and buildings, the project for the North-Eastern Quarter, Hotel Metropole and other notable buildings in Brussels.

== Biography ==
Gédéon Bordiau was born in Neufvilles (Soignes) on 2 February 1832. Bordiau was educated at the Academy of Fine Arts in Brussels and most of his career was concentrated in the Belgian capital. Working for the public administration, Bordiau was initially a co-designer of the Public Buildings section of the City of Brussels, working under the supervision of and eventually succeeding Poelaert as the Municipal Architect. His institutional involvement continues with his membership in Royal Monuments Commission and the Royal Academy of Fine Arts of Belgium. In these years Bordiau assures numerous public and private commissions, becoming one of the main protagonists of the architecture in Belgium in the second half of the 19th century. Bordau died on 23 January 1904.

== Main works ==
- 1861-1862: Houses of artists, Madou square in Saint-Josse-ten-Noode (demolished)
- 1873-1877: Construction of the zoo in Parc Léopold in Brussels (cages, basin, shelters, and entrance door)
- 1872-1876: Immeuble de rapport, 17 place de Brouckère, in Brussels (incorporated in hôtel Métropole)
- 1875-1890 ca: Quartier Nord-Est in Bruxelles
- 1877: hôtel, rue Galilée in Saint-Josse-ten-Noode
- 1878-1904: Palace and parc du Cinquantenaire
- 1881: House in rue du Duc in Watermael-Boitsfort
- 1891: Soignies railway station
- 1891-1894: Modifications to the Luxembourg Ducal Palace
- 1902-1903: Enlargement of the sessions hall of the Sénat de Belgique, in rue de la Loi, Brussels
- Personal studio, rue de Spa, Brussels.

== Publications ==
- Gédéon Bordiau, Palais des Beaux-Arts destiné aux fêtes, concerts et réunions publiques. Projet de l'architecte Bordiau. Imp. A. Mertens et fils, Bruxelles, 1870.
- Gédéon Bordiau, Réponse à la notice complementaire de la Compagnie Immobilière de Belgique. A. Mertens et fils, Bruxelles, 1870
