= The Human Passions =

1899 sculpture by Jef Lambeaux

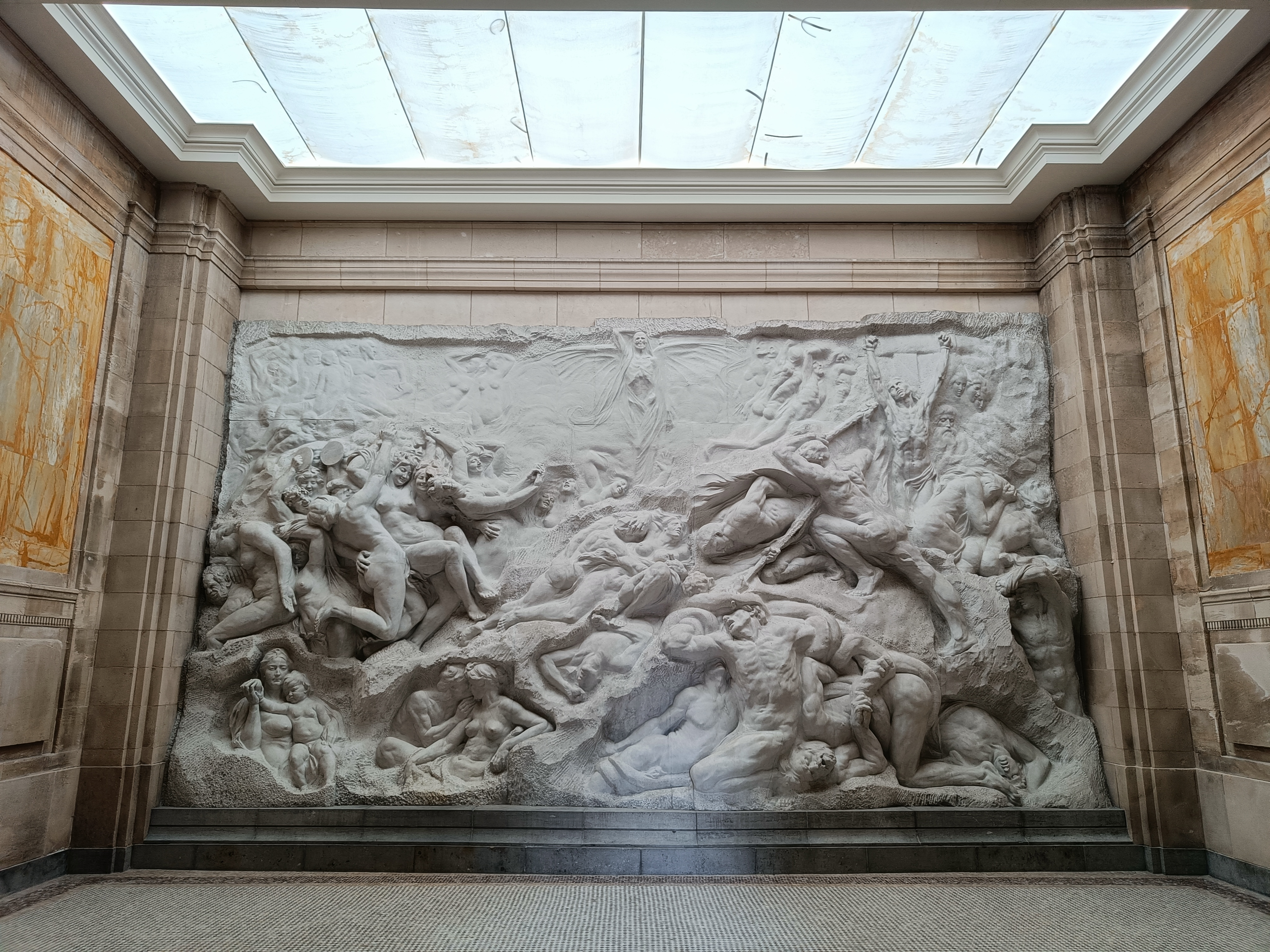
- Artist: Jef Lambeaux
- Completion date: 1899
- Dimensions: 6,32 cm × 1,117 cm (249 in × 440 in)
- Location: Royal Museums of Art and History, City of Brussels

The Human Passions (French: Les Passions Humaines; Dutch: De Menselijke Driften) is a monumental marble relief by the Belgian sculptor Jef Lambeaux. The work, measuring approximately 11.17 by 6.32 metres (36.6 ft × 20.7 ft), was commissioned in 1890 by King Leopold II and installed in the purpose-built Pavilion of Human Passions designed by Victor Horta in the Parc du Cinquantenaire/Jubelpark in Brussels. Since its conception, the relief has been noted for its scale, expressive style, and the controversies surrounding its subject matter and public reception.

== Description ==
The Human Passions is a monumental marble relief, carved from seventeen blocks of Carrara marble and measuring approximately 11.17 by 6.32 metres (36.6 ft × 20.7 ft). The composition forms a dense mass of intertwined figures representing a wide range of human emotions and impulses. The relief is highly dynamic, rising from left to right, with modelling that gradually softens from strong high relief in the lower register to a more subdued relief in the upper sections.

The work is structured as a series of sculptural groups representing allegories of human pleasure and suffering. In the lower register appear themes such as Motherhood, Temptation, Suicide, the Three Ages of Humanity, and the Murder of Cain and Abel. The middle register includes scenes of Lust, Joy or the Bacchanal, Rape, War, and Remorse represented by Adam and Eve. The composition is dominated by the figure of Death, flanked on the left by the Graces and on the right by the Infernal Legions, while at the far right the crucified Christ appears in the presence of God the Father and the three Fates.

== History ==
Work on The Human Passions began in the mid-1880s, when Jef Lambeaux conceived a monumental bas-relief representing humanity and its passions. Contemporary reports indicate that the project was already underway by 1886, when the critic Georges Verdavaine described it as a vast composition depicting "humanity erupting with its passions". Lambeaux spent several years preparing a large drawing for the relief in his studio in Saint-Gilles, largely in isolation and keeping the design hidden from visitors. In early 1889, he reopened his studio and invited artists and critics to view the work. Early reactions were enthusiastic, with critics such as Max Sulzberger praising the ambitious composition and comparing its dramatic arrangement of figures to the work of Michelangelo and Peter Paul Rubens.

Lambeaux initially intended to present the drawing at the Exposition Universelle of 1889, but it was not exhibited there, probably because it was not yet finished. On 15 May 1889, the critic Lucien Solvay noted the sculptor's absence from the exhibition in the newspaper Le Soir. The drawing was first publicly displayed later that year at the Triennial Salon of Ghent, held from 11 August to 6 October 1889, where it was exhibited under the title Humanity. The work attracted considerable attention and immediately provoked debate in the press. While some critics described it as a masterpiece, others criticised the dense composition of intertwined figures and questioned the philosophical meaning of the work.

The controversy intensified after Solvay published a critical review in Le Soir, arguing that the composition lacked coherence despite its striking visual effects. Other critics, including Achille Chainaye writing under the pseudonym Champal in La Réforme, strongly defended the work. In October 1889, the magazine L'Art Moderne further inflamed the debate with an article attacking the praise surrounding the drawing and accusing certain critics of exaggerating its merits. The dispute divided the press into supporters and detractors and contributed to the growing public attention surrounding the project.

Despite the controversy, the Belgian state commissioned the relief in 1890 for 136,000 francs. The sculpture was intended for installation in the Parc du Cinquantenaire in Brussels, where a pavilion designed by Victor Horta was later constructed to house it. A full-scale plaster model of the composition was completed in 1894, and the final marble relief was inaugurated on 1 October 1899. During this period, the work was known under several different titles proposed by critics, including The Passion of Humanity and The Calvary of Humanity. The title The Human Passions was adopted later and appeared above the entrance of the pavilion when it was completed in 1910.

== Pavilion of Human Passions ==
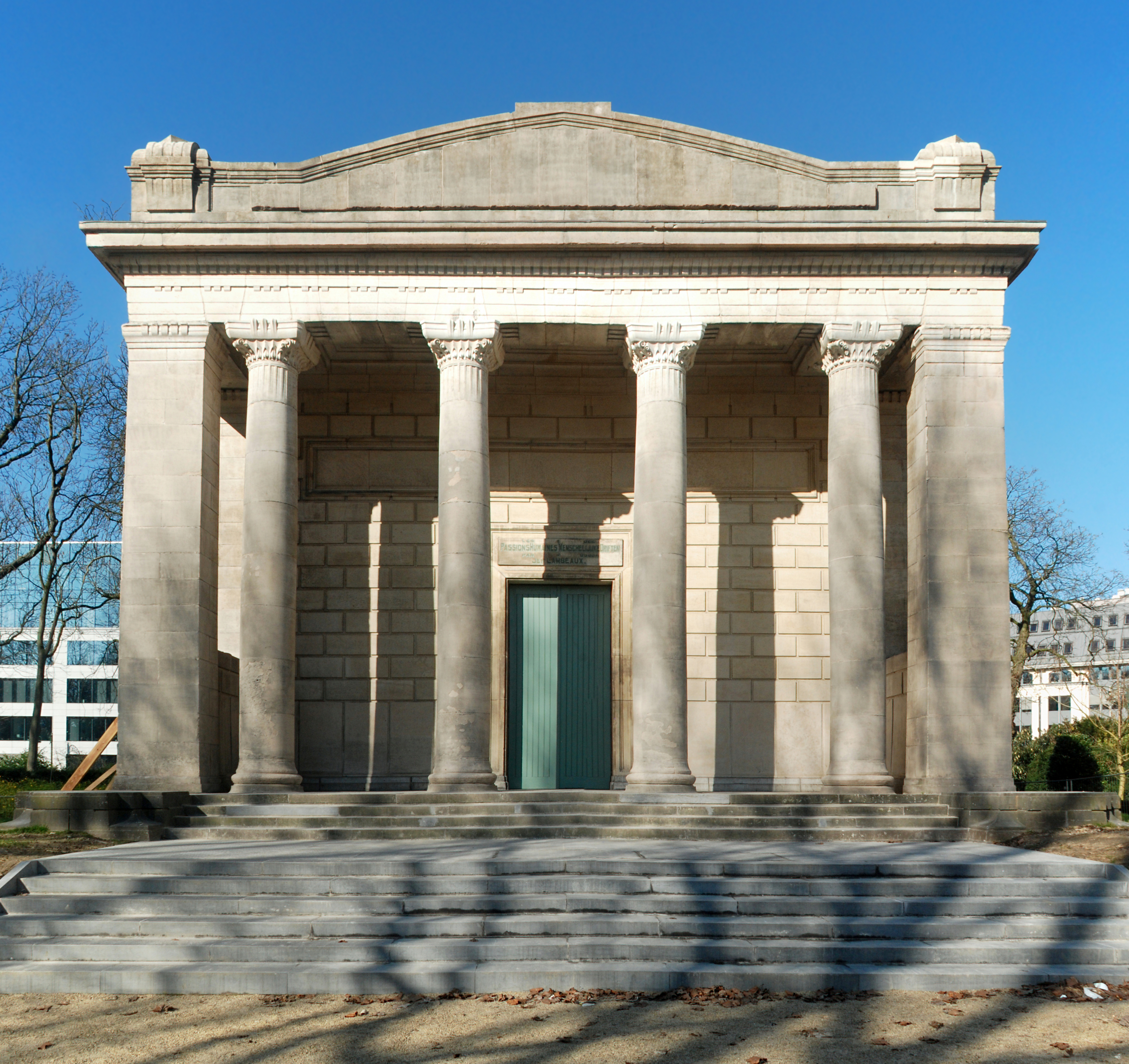
Pavilion of Human Passions

The pavilion designed by Victor Horta was officially inaugurated on 1 October 1899. When the relief was unveiled to the public, it sparked intense debate in the press. Much of the controversy centred on the explicit representation of male and female nudes engaged in various sensual and dramatic scenes.

The scandal was intensified by the inclusion of a depiction of the crucified Christ placed below the figure of Death, which provoked outrage among conservative groups in Belgium. Only three days after the opening, the open structure of the pavilion was screened from public view with a wooden barricade.

In response to the ongoing criticism, the Belgian government later instructed Horta to close the front of the pavilion with a permanent wall. This modification was carried out in 1909, and the building reopened in 1910 without an official ceremony. The pavilion remained architecturally incomplete.

== See also ==
- History of Brussels
- Culture of Belgium
- Belgium in the long nineteenth century
