= Inappropriateness =

Standards or ethics that are typically viewed as being negative in a society

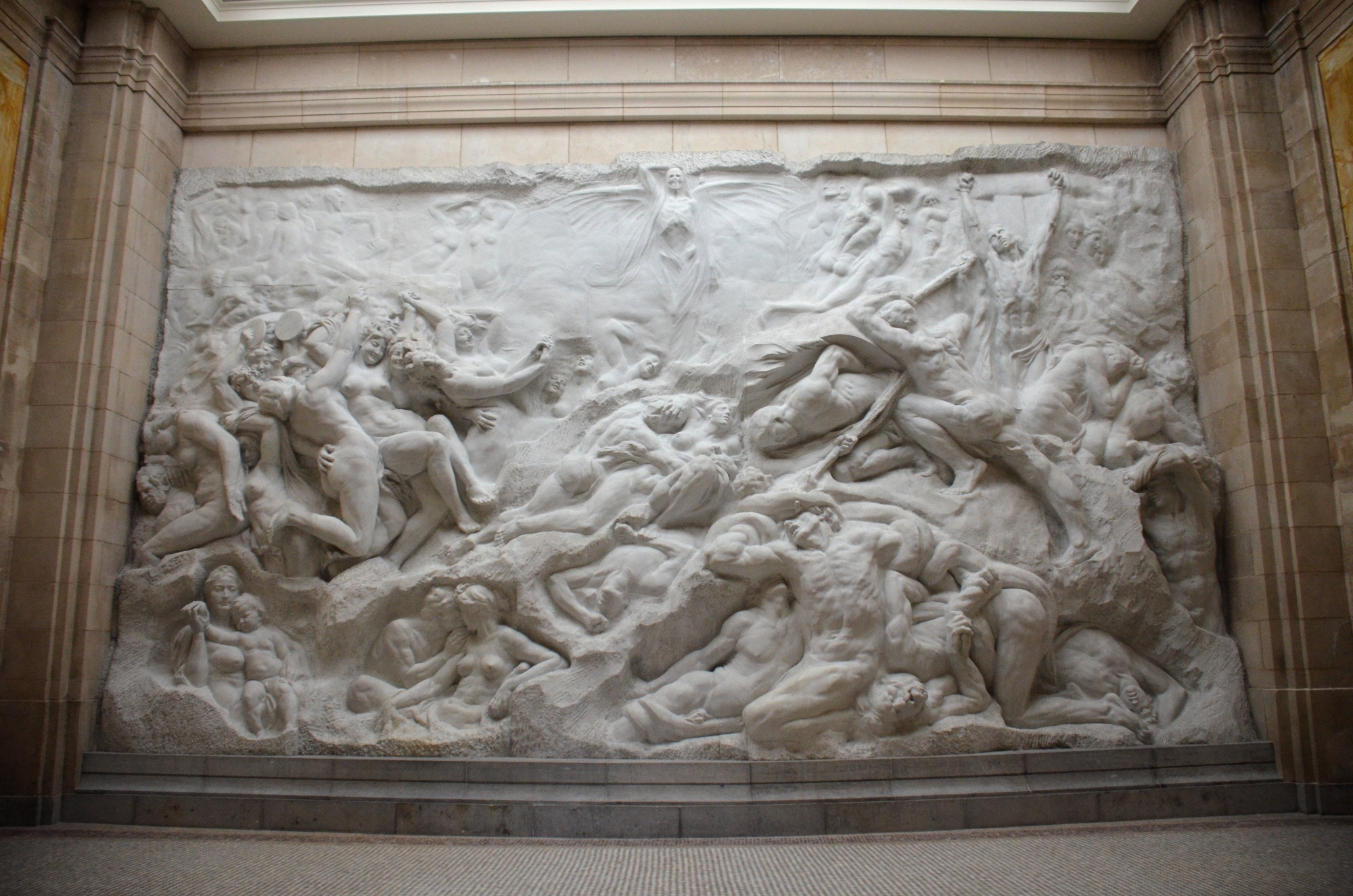
At the time, the Human Passions relief by Jef Lambeaux was deemed indecent.

Inappropriateness refers to standards or ethics that are typically viewed as being negative in a society, often treated as objective by moralists. It differs from things that are illicit in that inappropriate behavior does not necessarily have any accompanying legal ramifications.

== Compendium ==
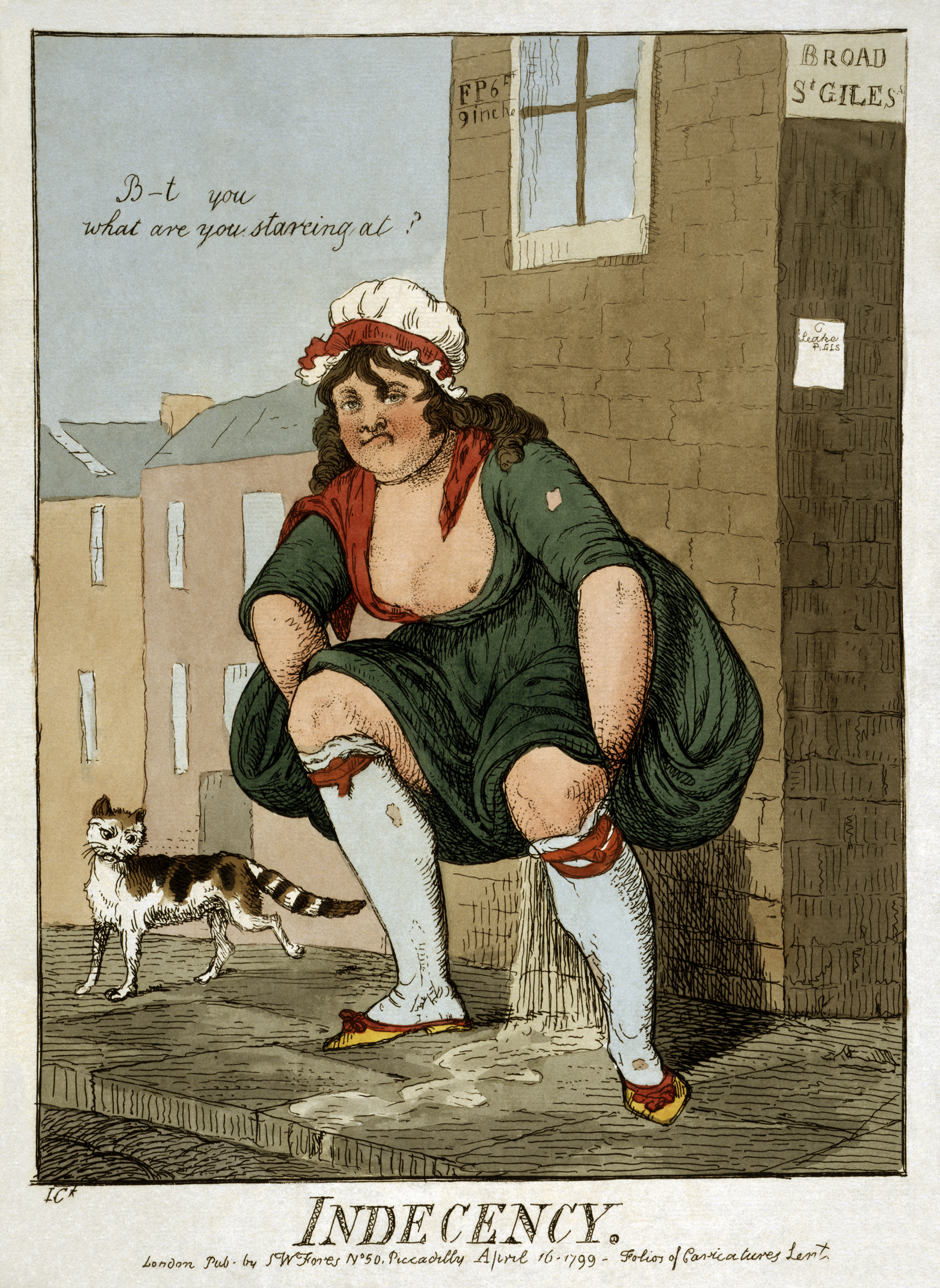
Indecency by Isaac Cruikshank, depicting public urination

Synonyms of inappropriate include improper, unfitting, unsuitable and indecent. Although social ills are usually outlawed in wider society, there are many examples wherein various jurisdictions give their inhabitants full discretion over certain aspects of their lives so they can police themselves without any intrusiveness. For instance, although it's legal to flatulate in a crowded elevator, there are strong social pressures not to do so. Other socially contentious behavior, such as smoking while pregnant, may procure a statement from a public health organization rather than from a law enforcement organization. The term has also been used to negatively refer to the usage of recreational drugs. Increasingly, the term is used in the context of sexual misconduct, especially touching of erogenous zones such as the genitalia or sending photos of said private parts.

== Regulation ==
In the United States, the Supreme Court has ruled in FCC v. Pacifica Foundation (1978) that the Federal Communications Commission has the power to punish constitutionally protected but "indecent" expression on radio and broadcast television. The FCC released guidelines on indecency in 2001. The radio and television broadcast of indecent material is prohibited between 6 a.m. and 10 p.m.

== History - San Francisco ==
Indecency and good morals laws became more common in 19th century San Francisco as the population of women increased. Very frequently, immigrant women were targeted for being indecent regardless of whether they were a sex worker or not. European men criticized Chinese, Mexican, and South American women for being improper, immodest, and impure, articulating a stark boundary between racialized and gendered legality.

== See also ==
- Indecent exposure
- Immorality
- Outraging public decency
