= Pavilion of Human Passions =

Neoclassical pavilion in Brussels, Belgium

- Pavillon des Passions humaines (French); Paviljoen der Menselijke Driften (Dutch)
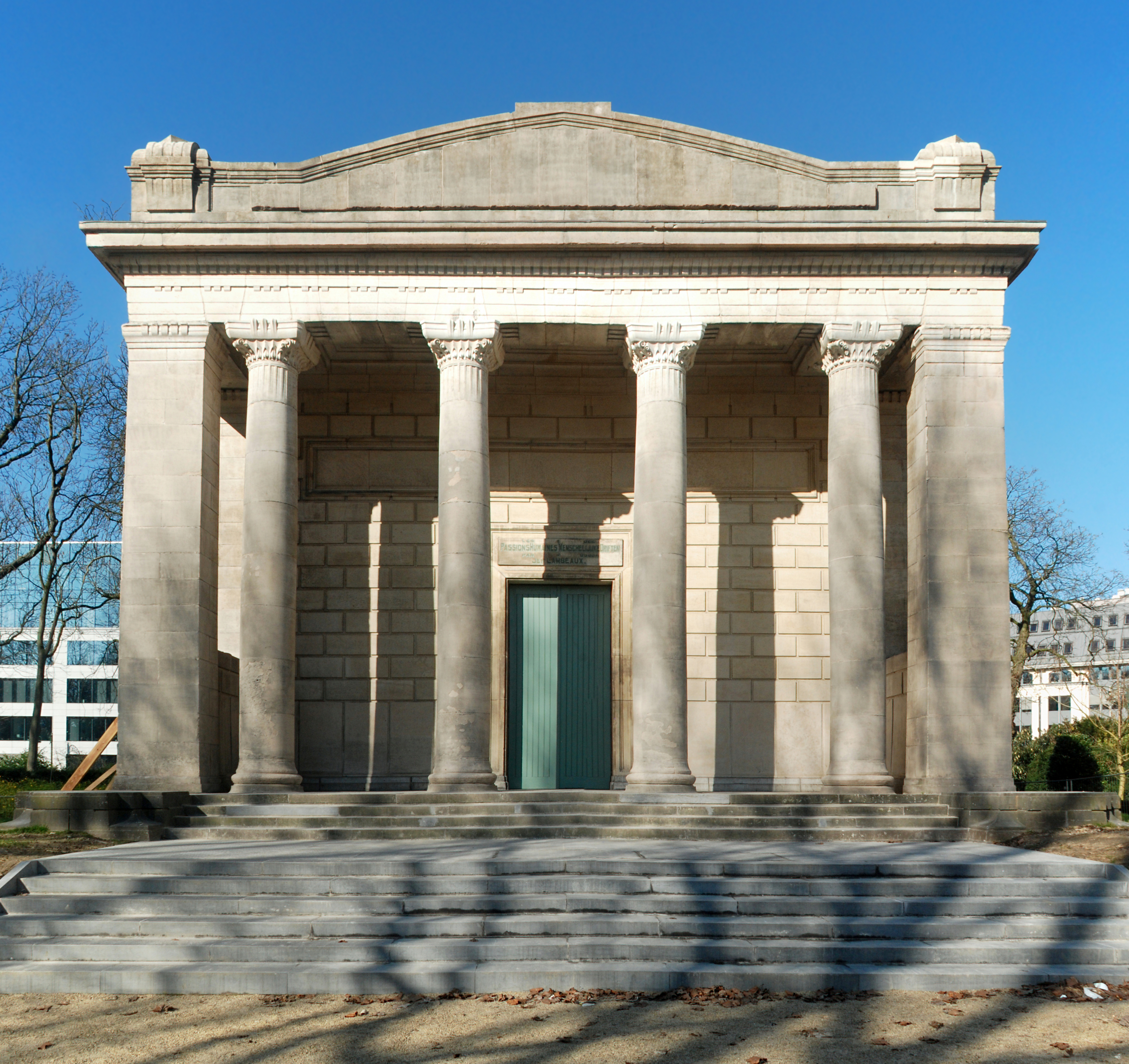
- Interactive map of the Pavilion of Human Passions area
- Alternative names: Horta-Lambeaux Pavilion

General information
- Architectural style: Eclectic; Neoclassical
- Location: Parc du Cinquantenaire / Jubelpark, 1000 City of Brussels, Brussels-Capital Region, Belgium
- Coordinates: 50°50′35.02″N 4°23′14.48″E
- Current tenants: Saudi Arabia (until 2068)
- Construction started: 1891
- Completed: 1897
- Inaugurated: 1 October 1899
- Renovated: 2013–2015
- Cost: Building: 100,000 Belgian francs; Sculpture: 136,000 Belgian francs
- Renovation cost: €800,000
- Client: Belgian government
- Owner: Belgian government
- Landlord: Royal Museums of Art and History

Technical details
- Floor area: 20 by 15 metres (66 ft × 49 ft)

Design and construction
- Architect: Victor Horta
- Other designers: Jef Lambeaux
- Main contractor: Alphonse Balat
- Designations: Protected (18/11/1976)

Website
- www.artandhistory.museum/en/pavilion-human-passions

The Pavilion of Human Passions (French: Pavillon des Passions humaines; Dutch: Paviljoen der Menselijke Driften), also known as the Horta-Lambeaux Pavilion (French: Pavillon Horta-Lambeaux; Dutch: Horta-Lambeauxpaviljoen), is a neoclassical pavilion in the Parc du Cinquantenaire/Jubelpark of Brussels, Belgium. Commissioned by the Belgian state, it was designed by the architect Victor Horta and constructed between 1891 and 1897 to serve as a permanent showcase for The Human Passions, a monumental marble relief by the sculptor Jef Lambeaux. Although classical in appearance, the building—in the form of a Greek temple—shows the first steps of the young Horta towards Art Nouveau.

Since its completion, the building has had a complex history marked by long periods of closure, limited accessibility, and debates over the display and conservation of the artwork. Following a restoration campaign, it has periodically reopened to the public since 2014. It is managed by the Royal Museums of Art and History (RMAH).

== History ==
=== Inception and construction ===
In 1889, Victor Horta was commissioned for 100,000 Belgian francs to design a pavilion to house Jef Lambeaux's monumental sculpture The Human Passions on the recommendation of his teacher Alphonse Balat, King Leopold II's favourite architect.

The small pavilion of classical look already announced the Art Nouveau manner associated with the architect. Although loyal to the formal vocabulary of classical architecture, Horta already managed to incorporate all elements of the new style. At first sight, the building looks like a classical temple. However, there is not a single straight line in the building. Every classical detail is revisited and reinterpreted. Horta succeeded in designing an almost "organic" interpretation of the classical temple, without completely abolishing any reference to an historical style. Slightly bent like the foot of a tree, the walls seem to have sprung organically. After World War I, Horta would return to this classicism in his designs for the Centre for Fine Arts and the Musée des Beaux-Arts in Tournai.

Pavilion of Human Passions in 1998

The building, though, has had a turbulent history. The small neoclassical pavilion was originally planned for the 1897 Brussels International Exposition, of which it is one of the few physical remnants. Although completed in time for the fair, the collaboration between the architect and the artist soon led to an irreconcilable disagreement delaying its official opening until 1899. At first, Horta designed the pavilion's façade to be open, serving as a shelter on rainy days—without the wall and bronze doors behind the colonnade—so that the relief would always be visible for passers-by. But Lambeaux, against Horta's will, wanted a gallery wall behind the columns. The dispute remained unsolved for years: on the inauguration day on 1 October 1899, the unfinished temple stood open with the relief visible from the surrounding park. Under pressure of public opinion and the authorities, Horta had to alter his plans and close the temple with a wooden barricade, and it was left unfinished only three days after inauguration.

Lambeaux never knew the pavilion as it currently stands. Shortly after Lambeaux's death, Horta acceded to his wishes by building the wall that would permanently hide the bas-relief with a closed front to enhance the natural light coming through the glass roof. This modification was carried out in 1909, and the building reopened in 1910 without an official ceremony. The pavilion remained architecturally incomplete.

=== Later years ===
In 1967, the building was given in leasehold for 99 years by King Baudouin to King Faisal ibn Abd al-Aziz of Saudi Arabia, on an official visit to Belgium, together with the East Pavilion of the 1880 National Exhibition that would later become the Great Mosque of Brussels, to house a museum of Islamic art. (Note: The building belongs legally speaking to the non-profit organization Islamic Cultural Centre of Belgium, of which the ambassador of Saudi Arabia to Belgium is the chairman.) The building and the relief were protected by a royal decree issued on 18 November 1976. Two years later, the donation to King Khaled of Saudi Arabia was made official by the royal decree of 12 September 1979.

This new purpose entailed a transformation of the building, the initial sketches of which were drawn up by the Tunisian architect Mongi Boubaker, as well as the removal of the relief. Begun without authorisation in 1980, the dismantling work was quickly halted following a complaint from the Royal Commission for Monuments and Sites, which emphasised that the two works were inseparable. Numerous alternatives were then considered, such as moving the pavilion and its relief to the other side of the park and building a new museum next to the mosque. However, given the impossibility of finding a solution, the museum project was abandoned.

The Saudi government eventually gave its operation back to the Royal Museums of Art and History. The pavilion remained closed to the public except on occasional open days. Since 2002, the pavilion is open one hour per day, except on Mondays. In recent years, this was not due to the public's prudishness, but out of fear for vandalism.

=== Renovation ===
The building was left unattended for more than a century, and by the early 21st century, it required urgent renovation works. In 2008, the Belgian government officially started contracting out the renovation works by publishing two government procurements in the Belgian official journal. The restoration Jef Lambeaux's work should follow.

Renovation works of the building began in May 2013 and were completed in 2014 for a total cost of €800,000 financed by Beliris. The renovation of the relief itself was finished in 2015.

== The Human Passions relief ==
The Horta pavilion houses the monumental achievement of the sculptor Jef Lambeaux (1852–1908): The Human Passions relief. The draft on paper was presented at the Triennial Salon of Ghent in 1889, creating immediately a big commotion. The journal L'Art Moderne in 1890 described the work as:

(…) a pile of naked and contorted bodies, muscled wrestlers in delirium, an absolute and incomparable childish concept. It is at once chaotic and vague, bloated and pretentious, pompous and empty. (…) And what if, instead of paying for 300,000 francs of "passions", the government simply bought works of art?

Commissioned in 1890 by King Leopold II for 136,000 francs, the 12 by 8 metres (39 ft × 26 ft) work was centered around the theme of mankind's happiness and sins dominated by death. It also depicted mankind's "negative" passions, such as war, rape and suicide.

The relief had been very controversial ever since the project's presentation in 1886. Although enthusiastic at the beginning, art critics especially regret the work's lack of cohesion. Despite the controversy, the Belgian state acquired the work in 1890 for installation in the Cinquantenaire. Werner Adriaenssens is also inclined to deny the work mythical status:

Sure it is large, as Lambeaux intended, but hardly a masterpiece. The relief consists of separate groups rather than forming a whole. Unfortunately Lambeaux never explained his intentions. Even the title is not his.

On 1 October 1899, Horta's pavilion was officially inaugurated and the work revealed to the public. The unveiled way in which Lambeaux depicted the male and female nude was highly debated in the press. The relief depicting uninhibited nudes in any manner of carnal delights caused scandal. Nudity was not the only problem: the representation of the crucified Christ below Death outraged conservative Belgium. The open building was concealed from public view with a wooden barricade only three days after its first public presentation. Finally, the government responded to the criticisms by asking Horta to close the front of the building with durable materials in 1906. The front wall came in 1909. The building finally reopened in 1910, without an official opening, and remains unfinished.

The Belgian state ordered a plaster copy of Lambeaux's relief for its display in several world's fairs. The copy is today on display at the Fine Arts Museum of Ghent, Belgium. A fragment of the work won in 1900 a medal of honour at the World's fair of Paris.

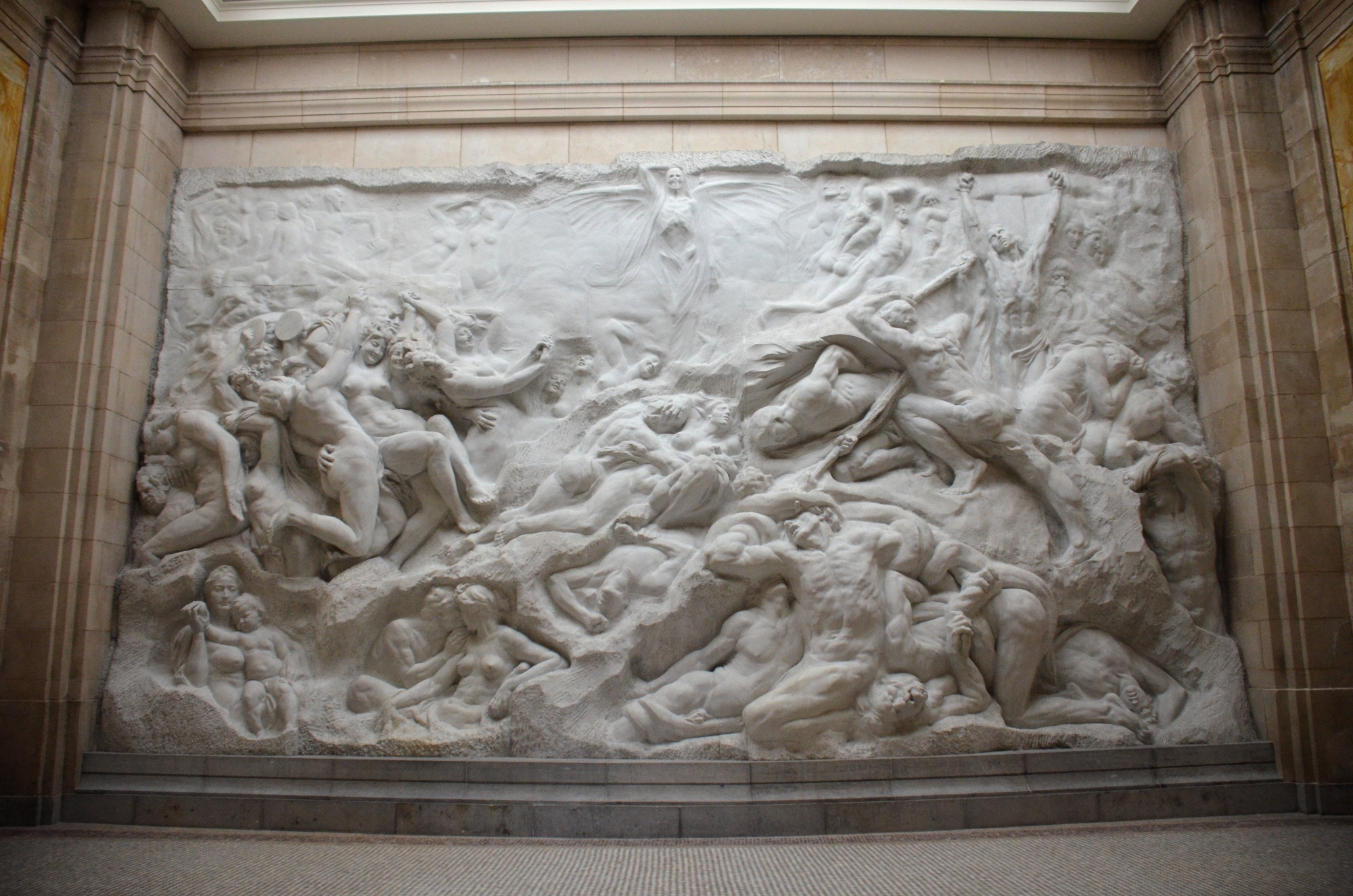
Detail of the relief made by Jef Lambeaux showcased in the Pavilion of Human Passions

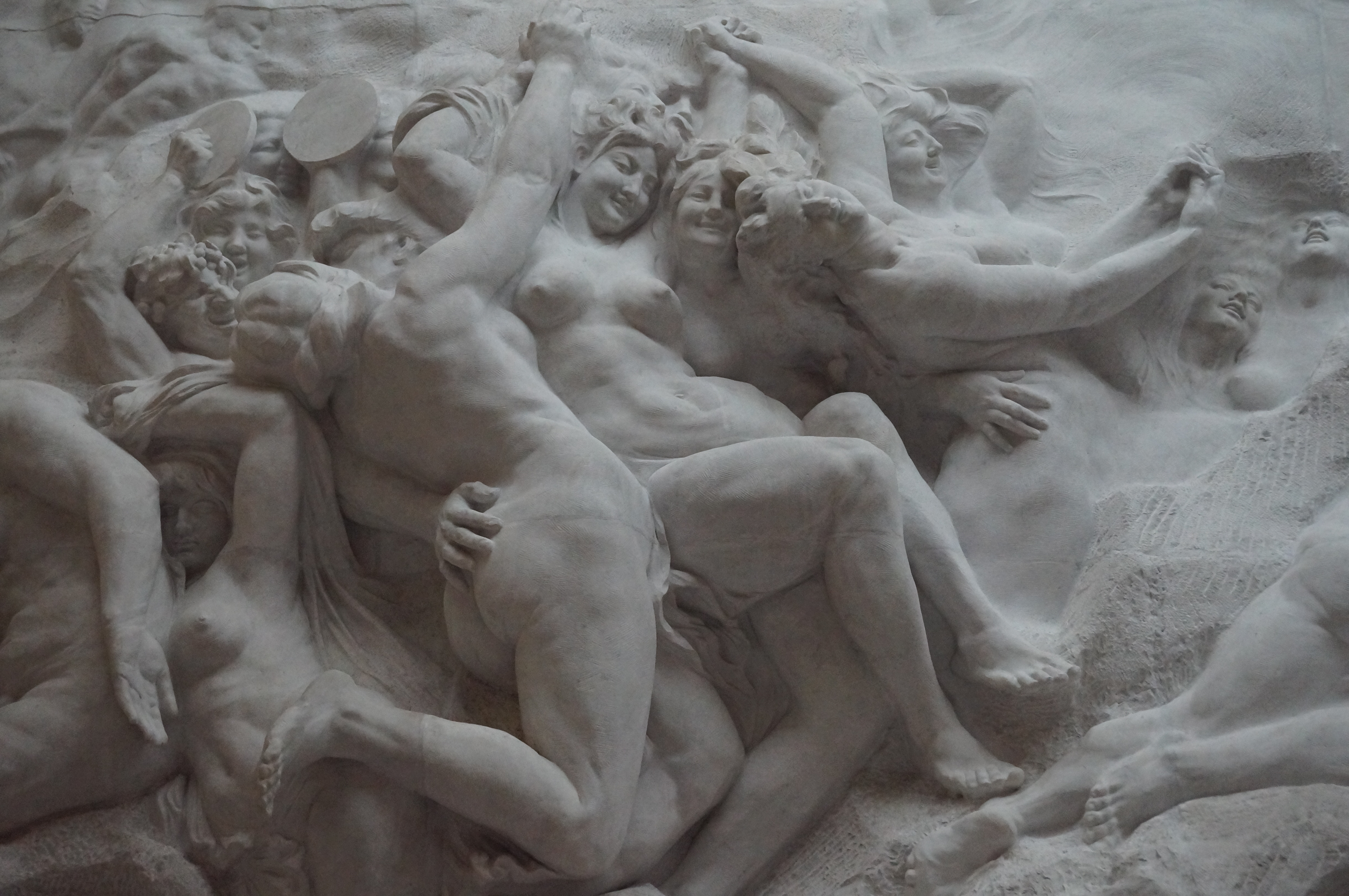
At the time as well as much later, the sculpture was deemed indecent.

== See also ==
- Art Nouveau in Brussels
- History of Brussels
- Culture of Belgium
- Belgium in the long nineteenth century
