= Royal Museums of Art and History =

Group of museums in Brussels, Belgium

Royal Museums of Art and History (RMAH)
- Musées royaux d'Art et d'Histoire (French); Koninklijke Musea voor Kunst en Geschiedenis (Dutch)
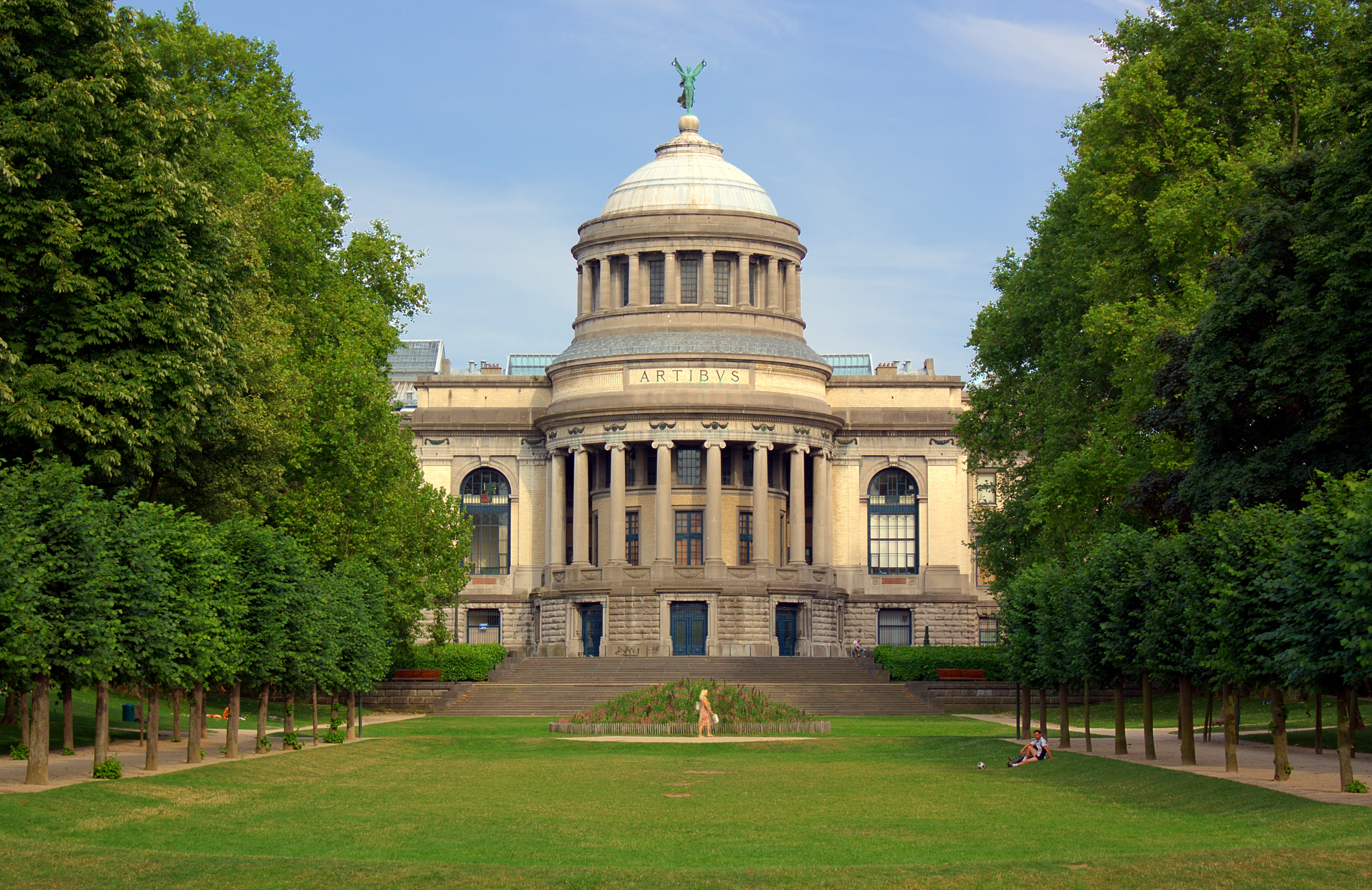
- The Art & History Museum, part of the Royal Museums of Art and History
- Interactive fullscreen map
- Location: Brussels, Belgium
- Type: Art and history museums
- Website: www.kmkg-mrah.be/en

The Royal Museums of Art and History (RMAH) (French: Musées royaux d'Art et d'Histoire (MRAH); Dutch: Koninklijke Musea voor Kunst en Geschiedenis (KMKG)) are a group of museums in Brussels, Belgium. They are part of the institutions of the Belgian Federal Science Policy Office (BELSPO) and consist of five museums: the Art & History Museum, the Horta-Lambeaux Pavilion, the Halle Gate, the Museums of the Far East and the Musical Instruments Museum (MIM).

== History ==
=== First royal and princely collections ===
From the early 15th to the 17th century, diplomatic gifts, mementoes and other curiosities owned by the Dukes of Burgundy and subsequently the Habsburg archdukes were displayed in the Royal Arsenal, a large hall located in the vicinity of the Palace of Coudenberg. It was there that the first collections, which are now housed in the Royal Museums of Art and History, were established. In 1794, a large number of these art treasures and objects, amassed over the centuries, were removed to the imperial museums in Vienna.

=== From the Halle Gate to the Cinquantenaire Palace ===
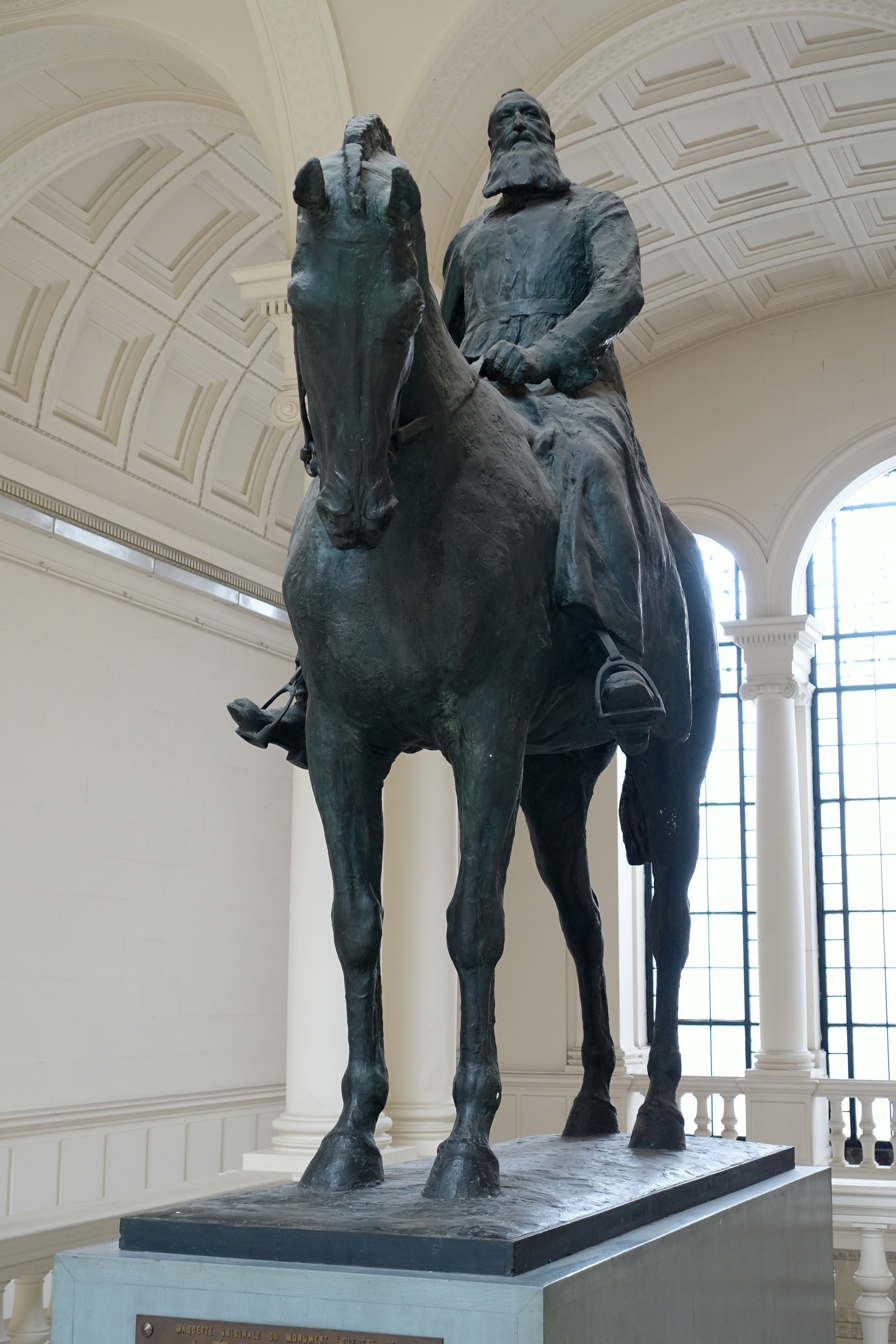
The museum was founded with the support of King Leopold II.

In 1835, with the intention of giving the independence of the young Belgian state a historical perspective, a Musée d'Armes anciennes, d'Armures, d'Objets d'Art et de Numismatique ("Museum of Antique Weapons, Armour, Object of Art and Numismatics") was established, headed by Count Amédée de Beauffort. The collections were moved to the Palace of National Industry, the left wing of the present Royal Museums of Fine Art.

Subsequently named the Musée royal d'Armures, d'Antiquités et d'Ethnologie ("Royal Museum of Armour, Antiquities and Ethnology"), the institution transferred its collections to the recently restored Halle Gate, a surviving gate of the old city wall surrounding Brussels. The first head curator was Antoine-Guillaume-Bernard Schayes. The collections expanded rapidly, thanks to important acquisitions, such as the purchase of the collection of Gustave Hagemans (1861), who notably donated the Lady of Brussels to the museum, and the bequest made by Émile de Meester de Ravestein (1874).

When the Halle Gate became too small to hold the ever-expanding number of items, the decision was made to split the collections, and in 1889, under the new head curator, Eugène Van Overloop, the classical antiquity collections were moved to the Cinquantenaire Palace, which had been built on the initiative of King Leopold II. In 1906, the ethnographic collection was likewise transferred there, the collection of arms and armour remaining at the Halle Gate.

The new museum complex at the Cinquantenaire was named the Royal Museums of Decorative and Industrial Arts. That name was changed in 1912 to the Royal Museums of the Cinquantenaire, but, to prevent confusion, it had to be changed yet again when the Museum of the Armed Forces and Military History was also established at the Cinquantenaire in 1922. The institution became the Royal Museums of Art and History, a name that was officially confirmed in 1926, and is still in use today. In 1925, Eugène Van Overloop was succeeded by the Egyptologist Jean Capart, during whose term of office the museums became a leading scientific institution.

The interwar period proved to be an auspicious period for the museums: the collections were expanded, funds were increased and various research centres were set up; in addition, various scientific expeditions were organised, most notably to Apamea (Syria), and to Easter Island in 1936, as well as excavations in archaeological sites across Belgium.

=== The museums after the Second World War ===
The Second World War brought the activities of the RMAH to a sharp halt. The collections were taken to safety, and in 1942, Henri Lavachery took over from Jean Capart. Immediately after the war, he began a thorough reorganisation of the institution. In 1946, a fire destroyed an entire wing of the Cinquantenaire Museum, as well as part of the collections housed there.

Rebuilding took time, with the new wing not being inaugurated until 1966. The work was overseen by Count Charles de Borchgrave d'Altena, head curator from 1951 to 1963, and by his immediate successor, Pierre Gilbert. All the while, they expanded the collections (with, among other things, the series of tapestries The History of Jacob) and modernised the museum. Since the mid-1980s, their successors as head curator have continued the work of reorganisation and renovation, organising some eighty major temporary exhibitions and adding to the institution's dynamism.

== Museums ==
The Royal Museums of Art and History form a group of several museums; two of them are located in the Parc du Cinquantenaire/Jubelpark: the Art & History Museum (formerly the Cinquantenaire Museum), which is the institution's headquarters and its most important site, and the Pavilion of Human Passions (1896), a building designed by Victor Horta to house a high-relief sculpture by Jef Lambeaux. Closer to town, the Halle Gate, a vestige of the second walls of Brussels (1381), houses medieval collections. The Musical Instruments Museum (MIM) is housed in an Art Nouveau building, the former Old England department store, on the Mont des Arts/Kunstberg. In addition, the Museums of the Far East, consisting of the Japanese Tower, the Chinese Pavilion and the Museum of Japanese Art, are located a few kilometers from the city centre, in Laeken.

=== Art & History Museum ===
The Art & History Museum is a museum of antiquities and ethnographic and decorative arts that occupies most of the southern part of the Cinquantenaire complex. It is one of the constituents of the Royal Museums for Art and History (RMAH), which itself is part of the Belgian federal institute of the Belgian Federal Science Policy Office (BELSPO), and is one of the largest art museums in Europe.

The museum consists of several parts, including a national collection of artefacts from prehistory to the Merovingian period (c. 751 AD), as well as from classical antiquity of the Near East, Egypt, Greece and Rome. Artefacts from non-European civilisations, such as China, Japan, Korea, pre-Columbian America, and the Islamic world, are also on display. Additionally, a collection of European decorative arts includes pieces from the Middle Ages to the 20th century, such as sculptures, furniture, tapestries, textiles, costumes, old vehicles, etc.

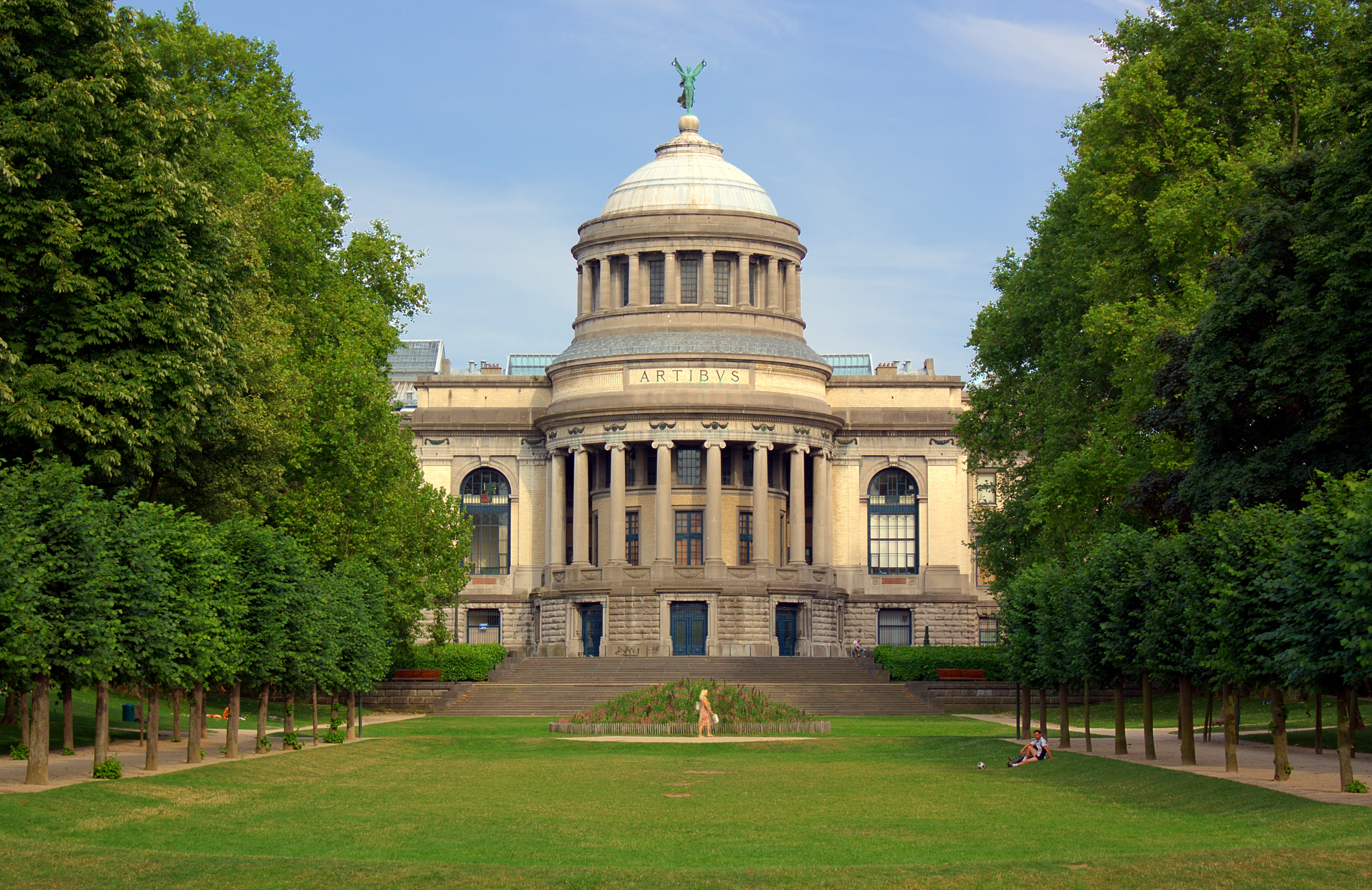
Art & History Museum

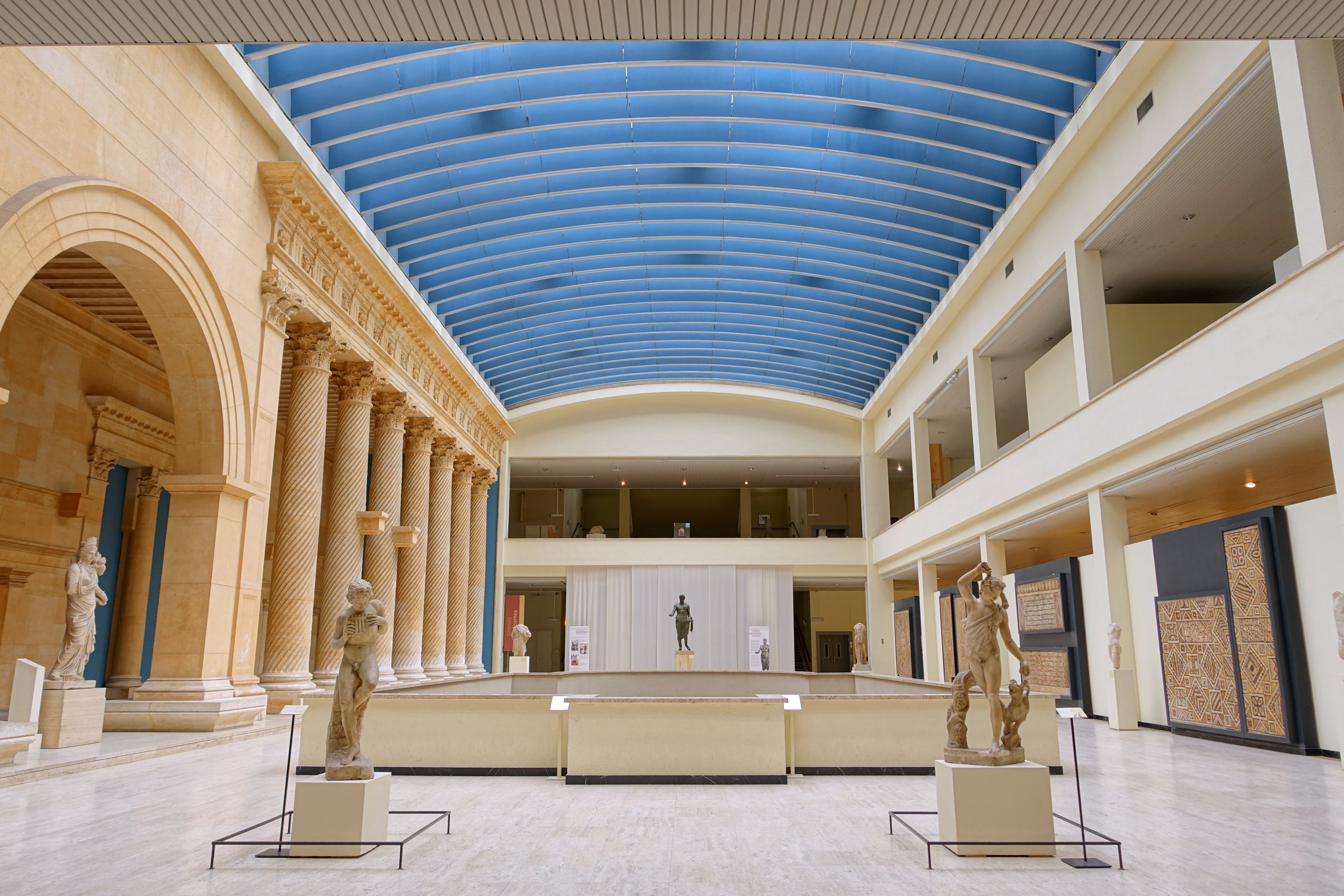
Classical antiquity collection

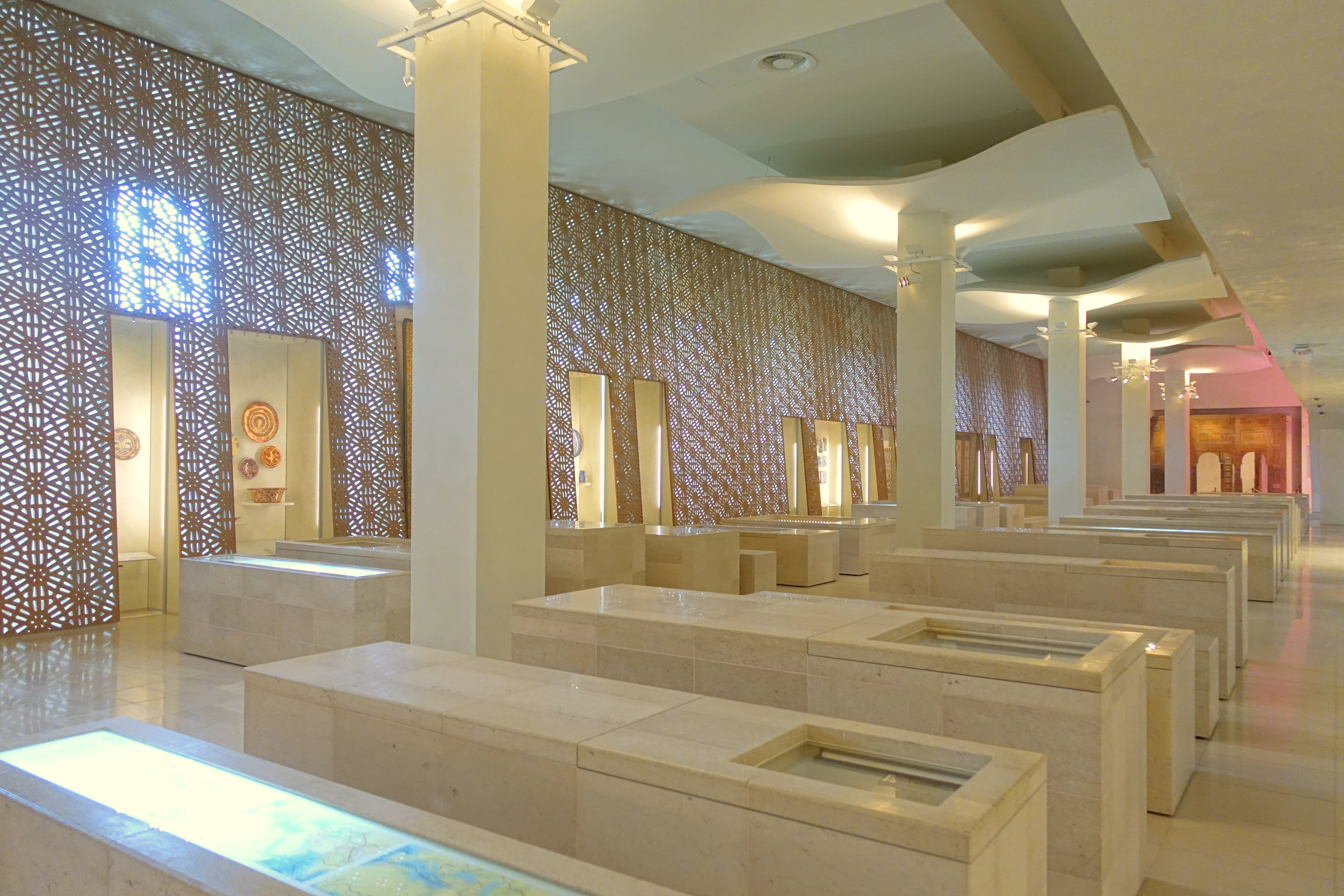
Islamic art collection

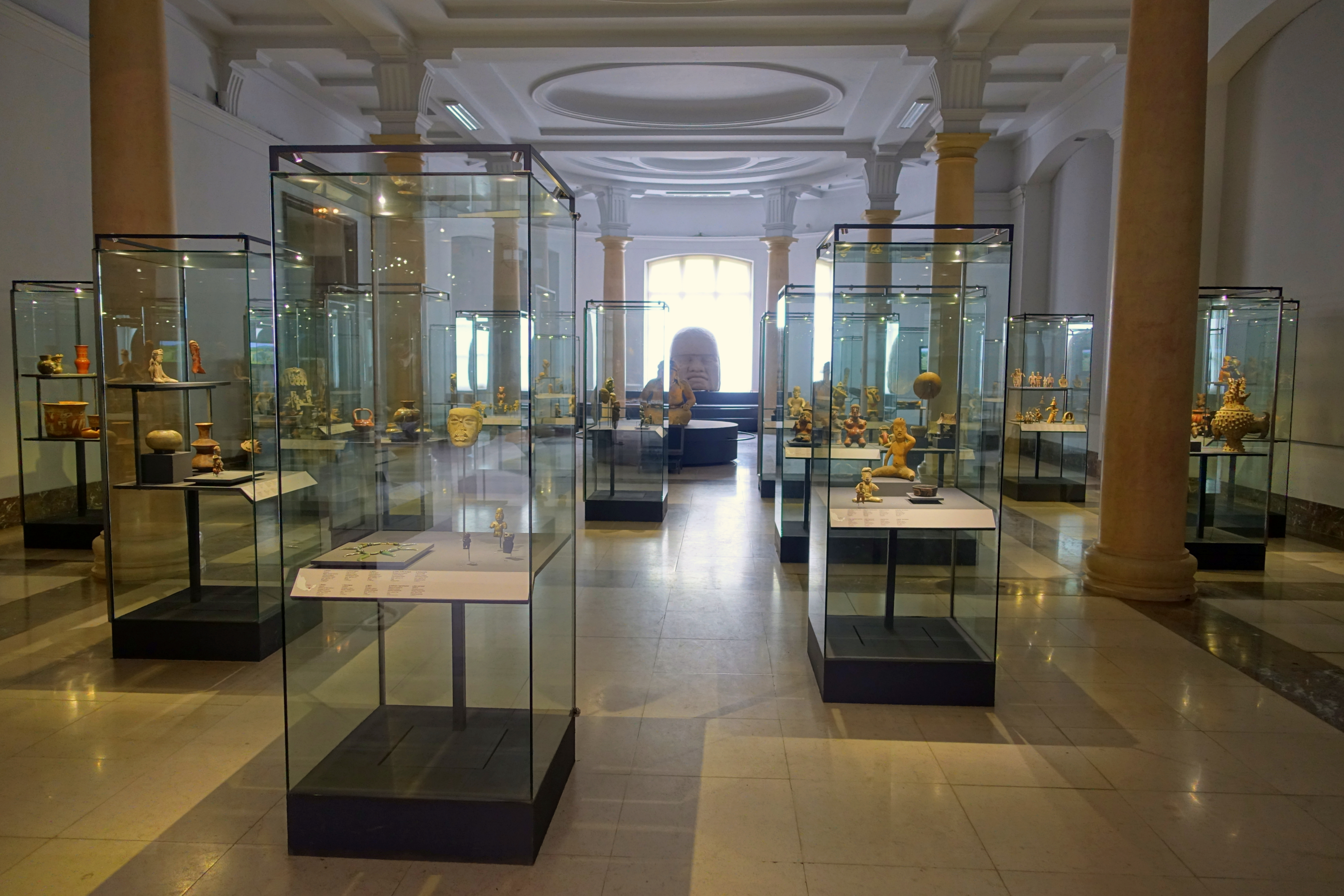
American collection

=== Pavilion of Human Passions ===
The Pavilion of Human Passions, also known as the Horta-Lambeaux Pavilion, is a neoclassical pavilion in the form of a Greek temple that was built by the architect Victor Horta in 1891–1897 in the Cinquantenaire Park. Although classical in appearance, the building shows the first steps of the young Horta towards Art Nouveau. It was designed to serve as a permanent showcase for The Human Passions, a monumental marble relief by the sculptor Jef Lambeaux. Since its completion, the building has remained almost permanently closed. Since 2014, it has periodically reopened to the public.

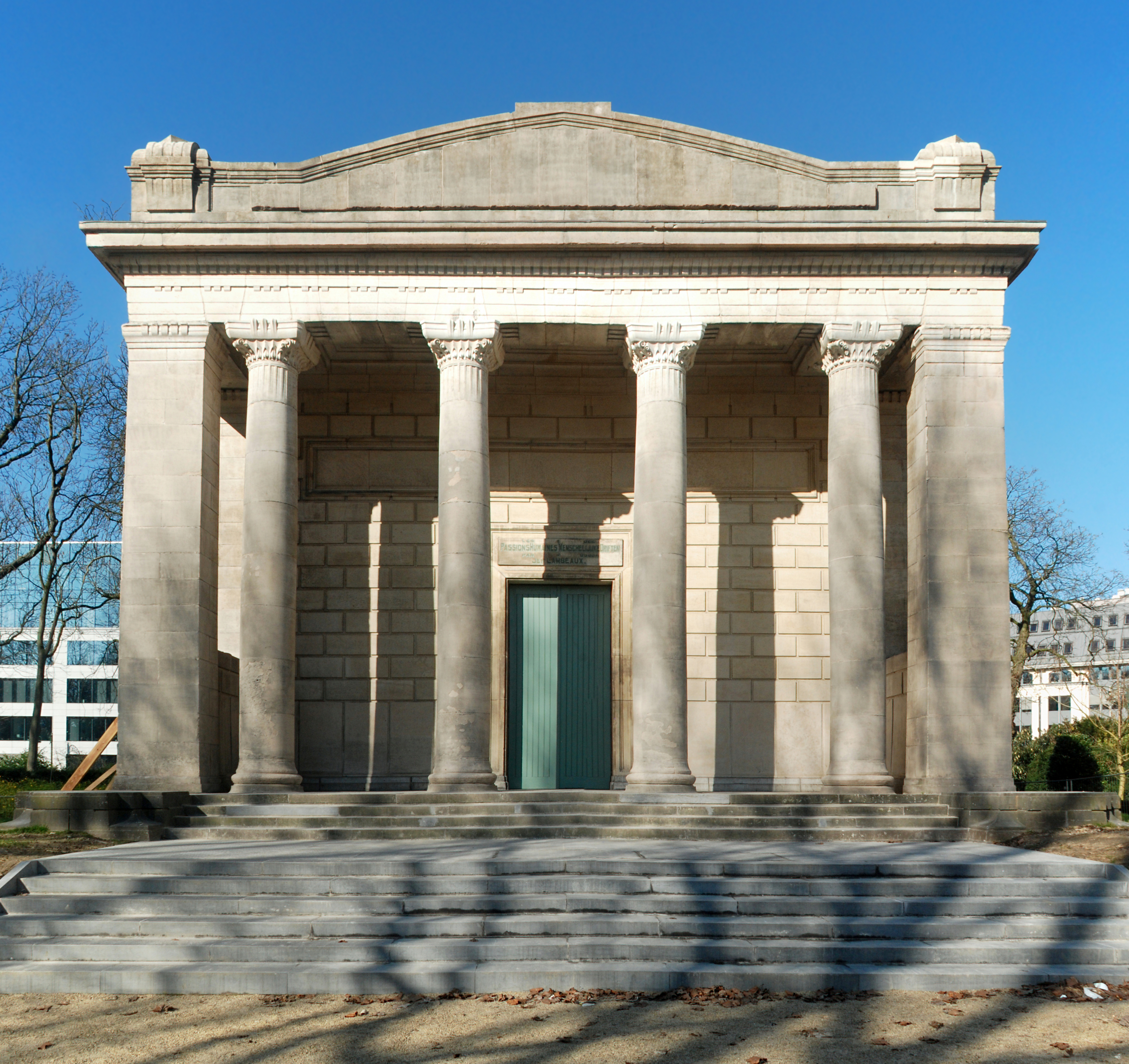
Pavilion of Human Passions

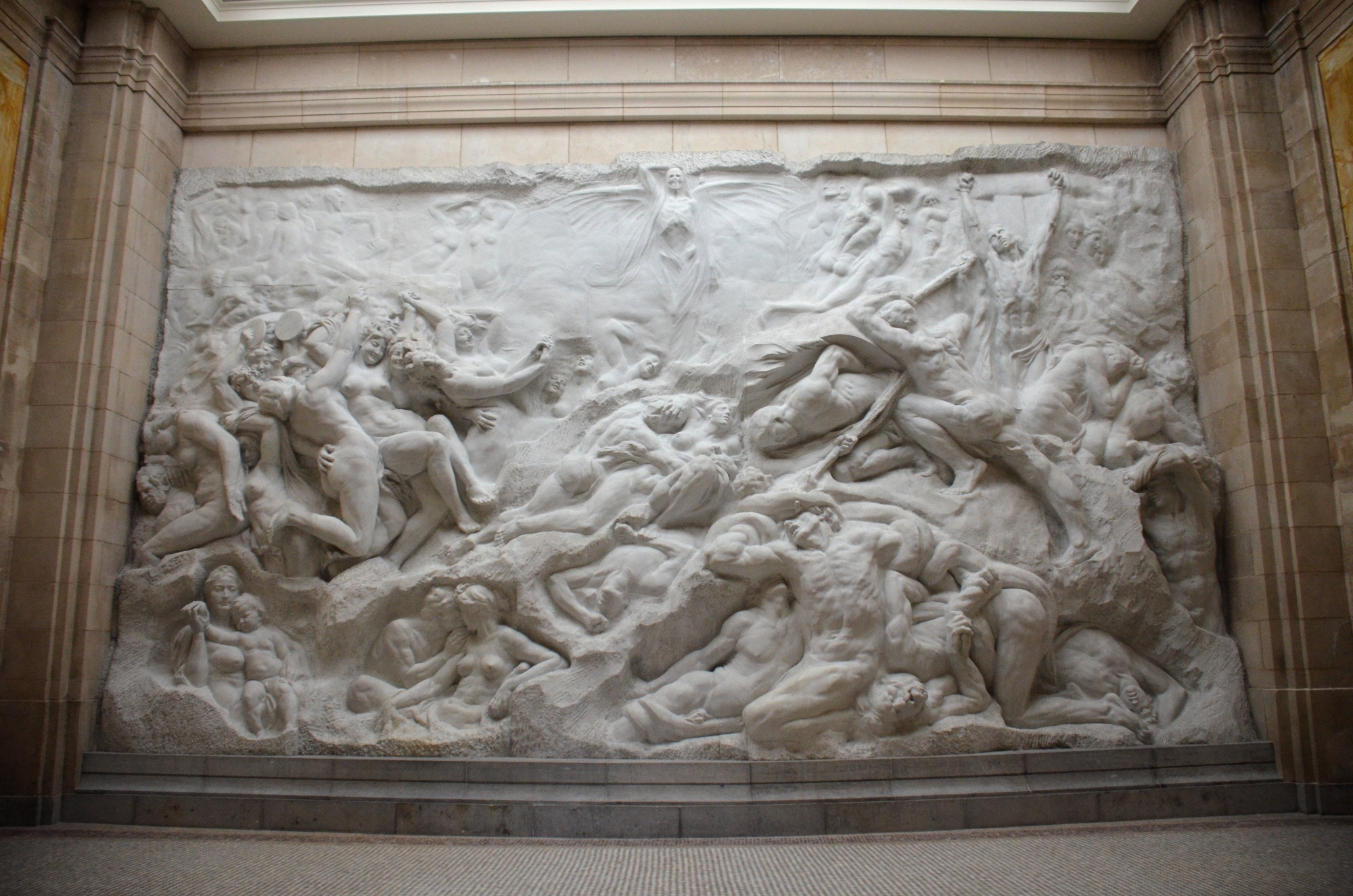
Detail of the relief made by Jef Lambeaux

=== Halle Gate ===
The Halle Gate is a former medieval city gate and the last vestige of the second walls of Brussels. Built in the 14th century, it was heavily restored in the 19th century in its current neo-Gothic style by the architect Henri Beyaert. It is now a museum dedicated to the medieval City of Brussels.

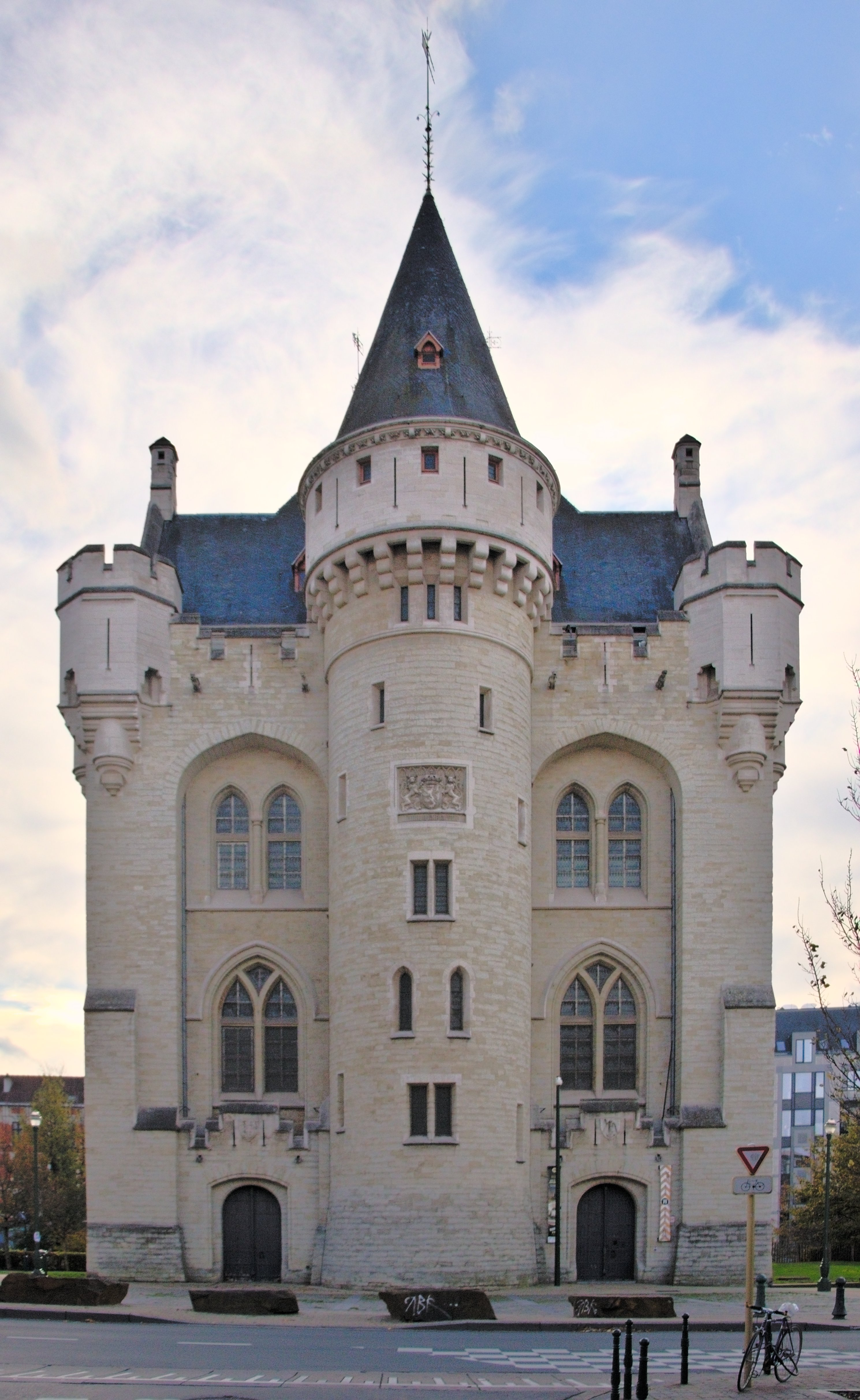
Halle Gate

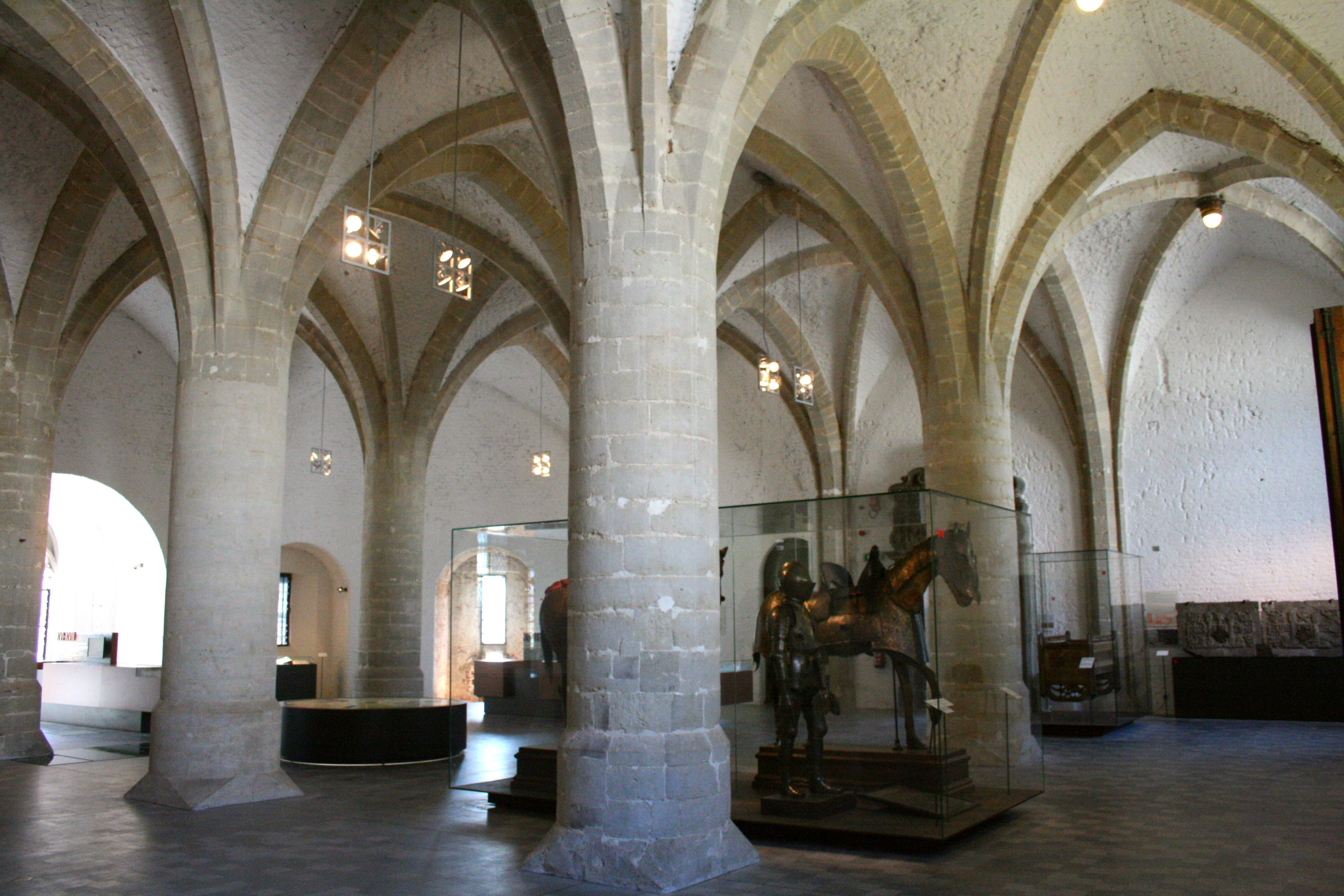
Gothic Room

=== Musical Instrument Museum ===
The Musical Instruments Museum (MIM) is a music museum that is internationally renowned for its collection of over 8,000 instruments. Since 2000, the museum has been located in the former Old England department store, built in 1899 by Paul Saintenoy out of girded steel and glass in Art Nouveau style, as well as the adjoining 18th-century neoclassical building designed by Barnabé Guimard.

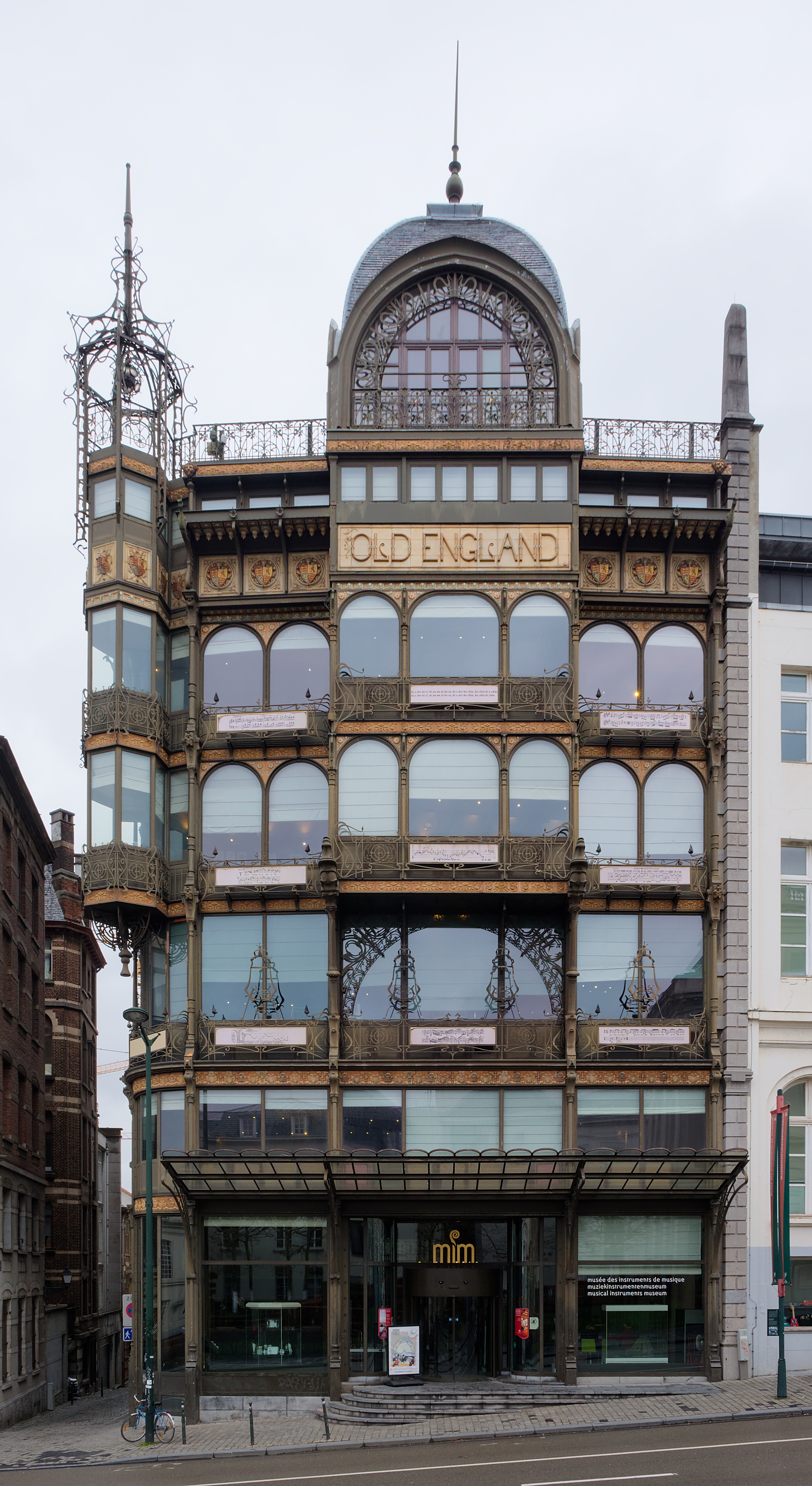
Musical Instruments Museum (MIM)

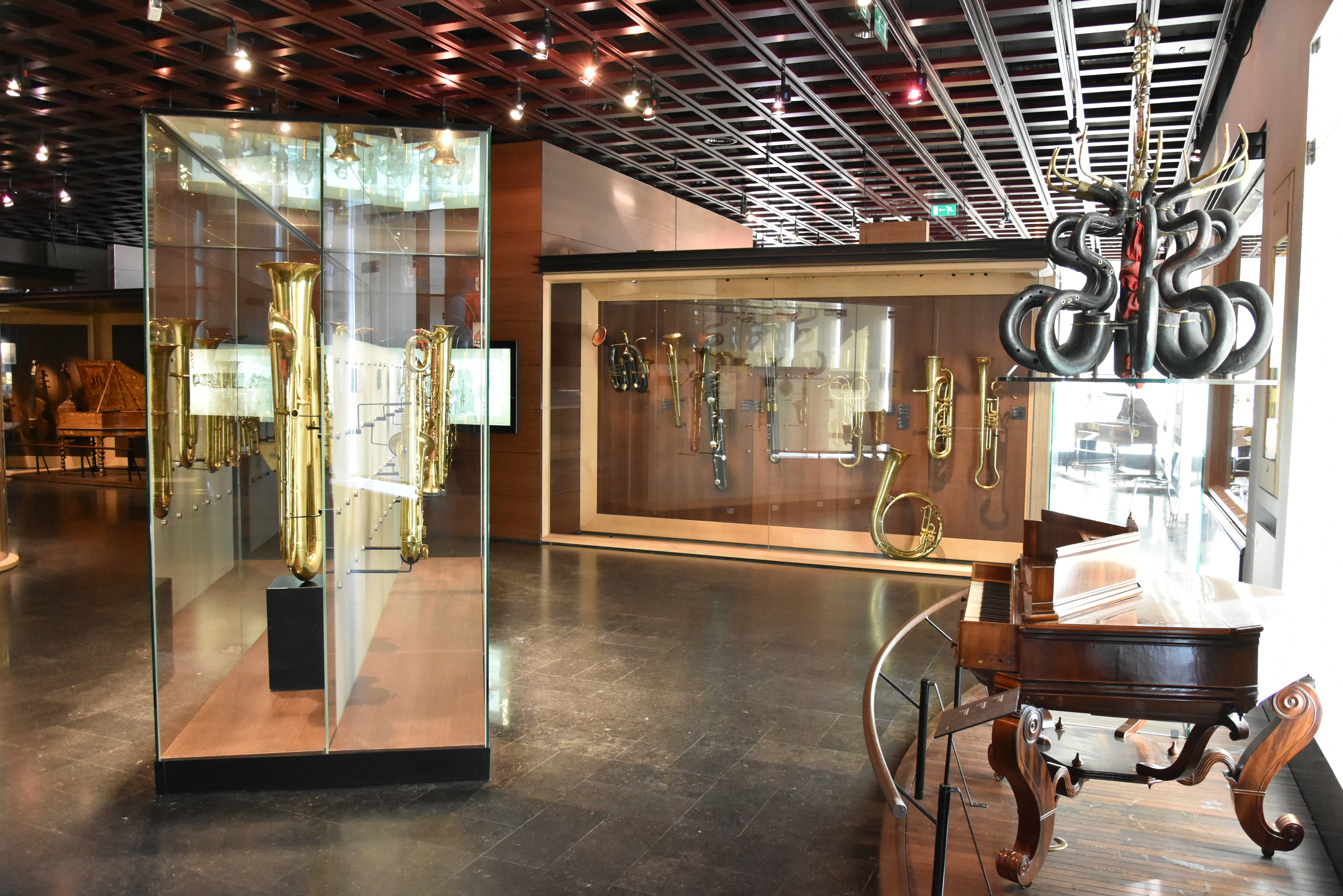
Exhibition space

=== Museums of the Far East ===
The Museums of the Far East is a complex of three museums in Laeken, in the north-west of the City of Brussels. Consisting of the Chinese Pavilion, the Japanese Tower and the Museum of Japanese Art, it is dedicated to Oriental art and culture, specifically that of China and Japan. These sites have not been open to the public since 2013, and their restoration is expected by 2027.

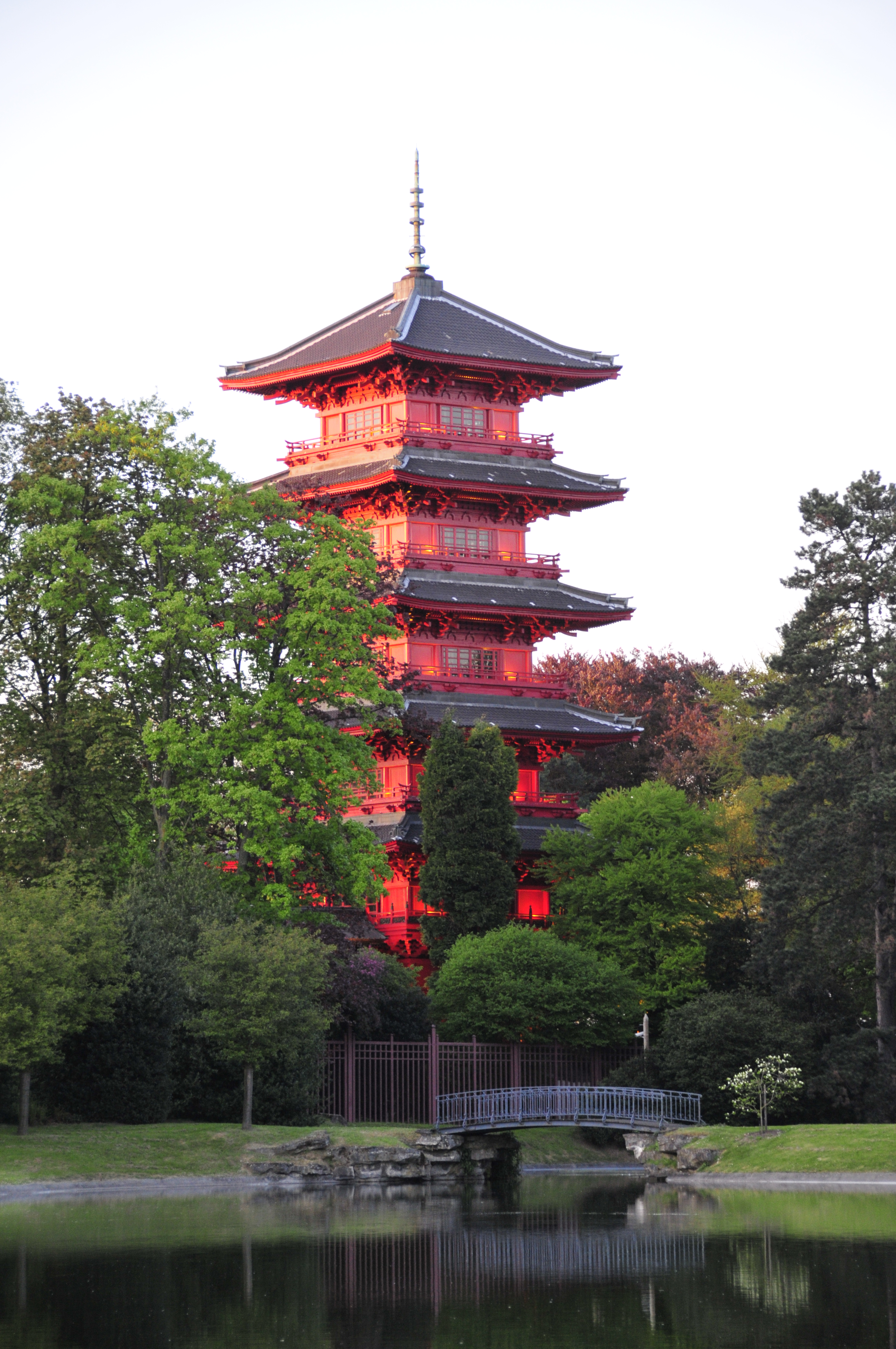
Japanese Tower of the Museums of the Far East

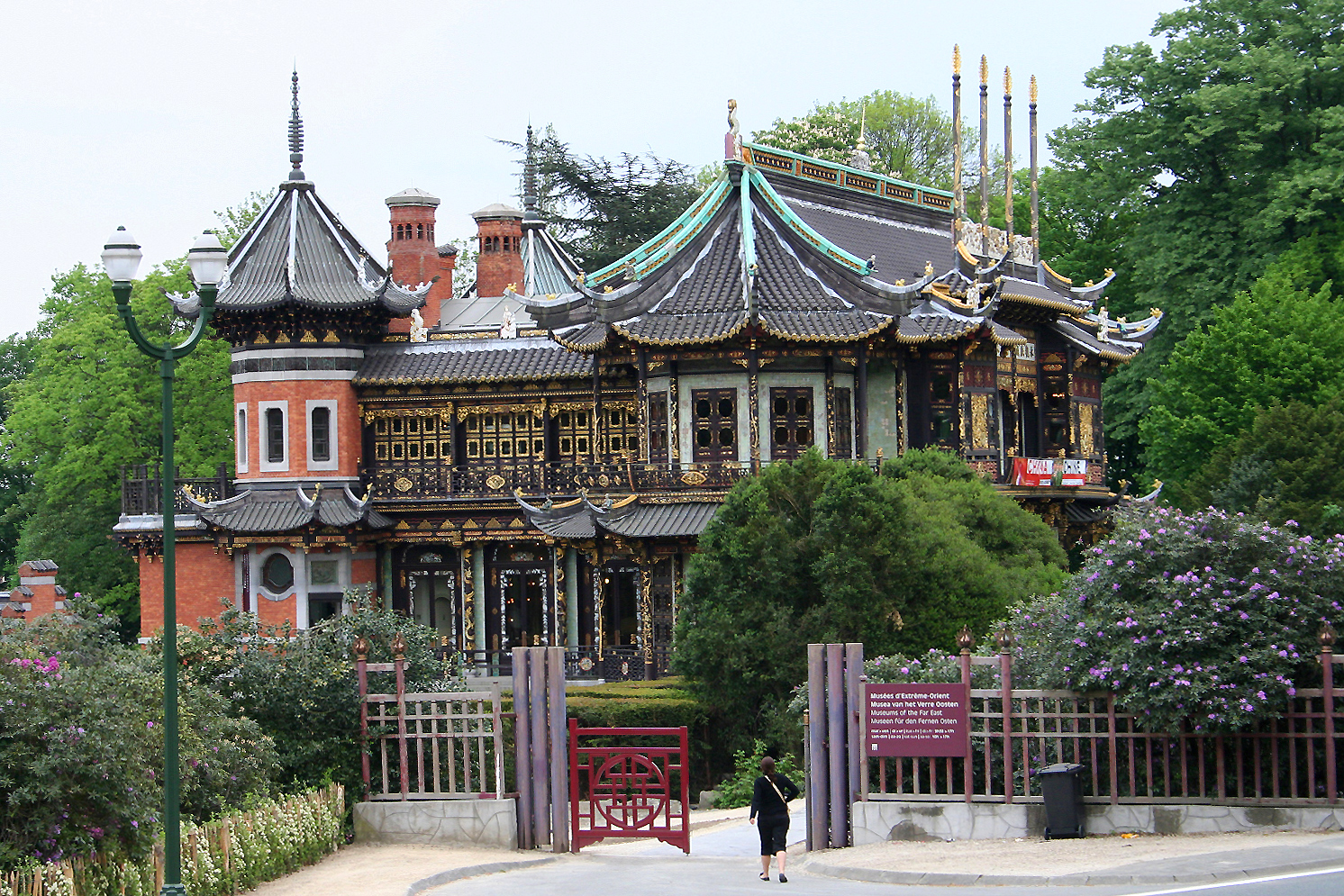
Entrance to the Chinese Pavilion

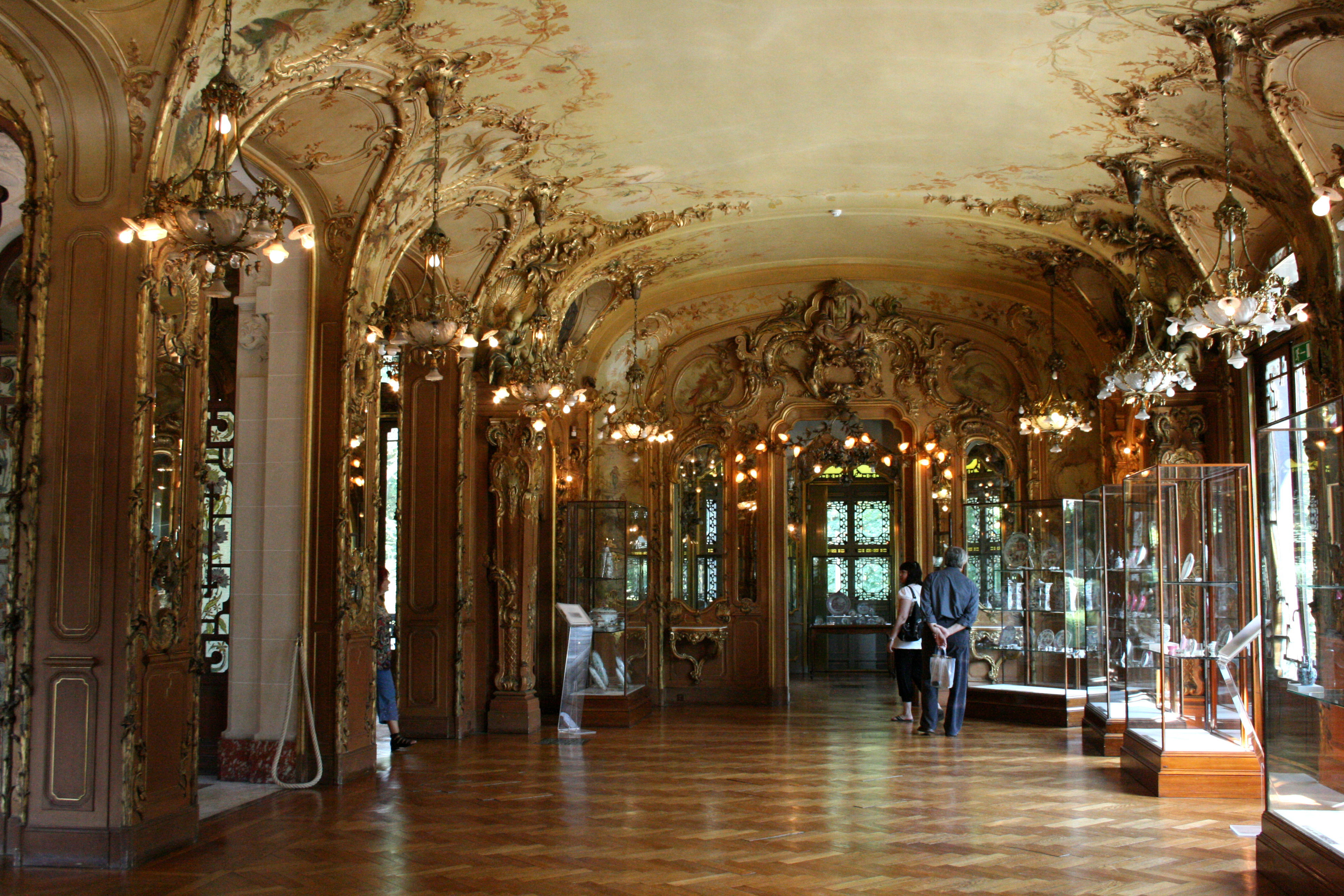
View of one of the principal rooms of the Chinese Pavilion

== See also ==
- Centre for Fine Arts
- Royal Museums of Fine Arts of Belgium
- History of Brussels
- Culture of Belgium
- Belgium in the long nineteenth century
