= Octave Maus =

Belgian art critic, writer and lawyer

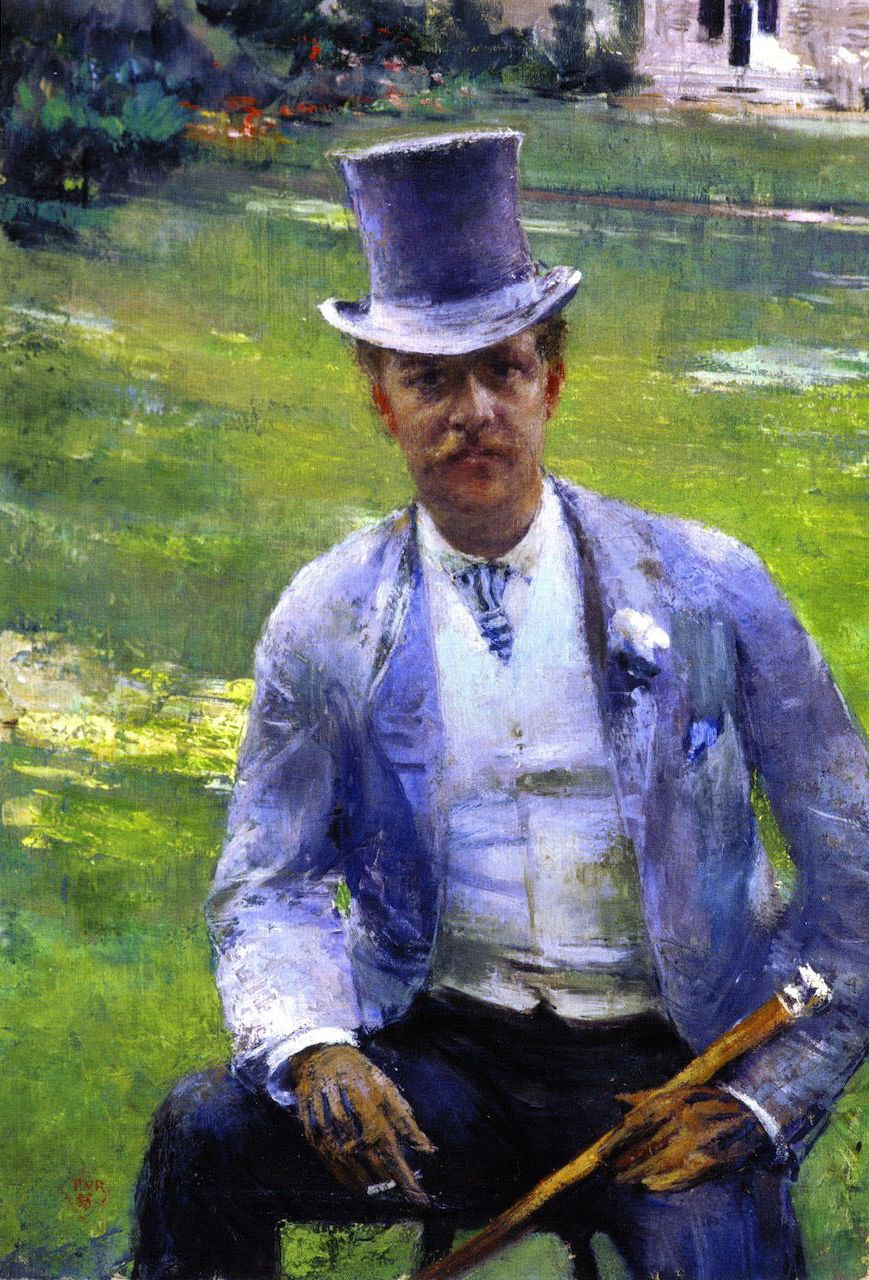
- Portrait of Octave Maus by Théo van Rysselberghe, 1885
- Born: 12 June 1856; Brussels, Belgium
- Died: 26 November 1919 (aged 63); Brussels, Belgium
- Known for: Art critic, writer, lawyer

Coat of arms of the Maus Family

Octave Maus (12 June 1856 – 26 November 1919) was a Belgian art critic, writer, lawyer and cousin of the painters Anna and Eugène Boch.

Maus worked with fellow writer/lawyer Edmond Picard, and they together with Victor Arnould and Eugène Robert founded the weekly L'Art moderne in 1881. In 1884 Maus was elected the secretary of the recently formed Les XX, and his responsibilities included the organization of the annual exhibitions.

In 1893 Maus advocated the dissolution of Les XX. In 1894 he founded La Libre Esthétique.

The composer Poldowski (daughter of Henryk Wieniawski) was a neighbour and lifelong friend of Maus's. She dedicated some of her song settings to Maus and his wife Madeleine, and her 1923 series of midday recitals at the Hyde Park Hotel in London, known as The International Concerts of La Libre Esthétique, attracted Arthur Rubinstein, Jacques Thibaud and the London String Quartet.

== Bibliography ==
- Madeleine Octave Maus: Trente années de l'lutte pour l'art, Librairie L'Oiseau bleau, Bruxelles 1926; reprinted by Éditions Lebeer Hossmann, Bruxelles 1980
