= L'Art Moderne =

Belgian arts and literary magazine (1881–1914)

L'Art moderne: Revue critique des arts et de la littérature
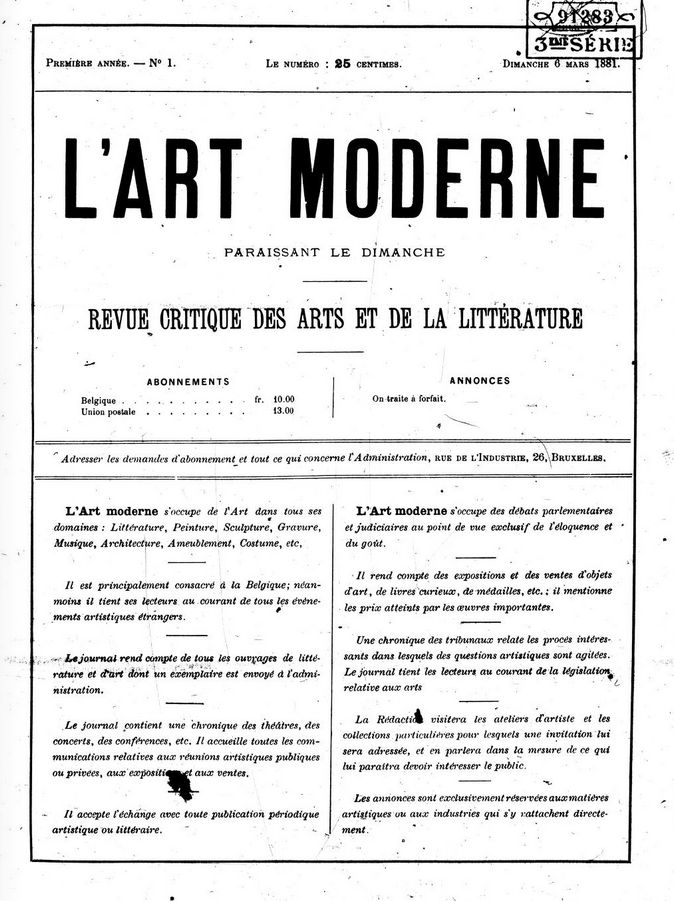
- Front page of the first issue
- Frequency: Weekly
- Format: 30x23cm
- First issue: 6 March 1881
- Final issue: 9 August 1914
- Country: Belgium
- Based in: Brussels
- Language: French

L'Art Moderne was a weekly review of the arts and literature published in Brussels from March 1881 until the outbreak of the First World War in August 1914. It was established by a number of lawyers based in Brussels who felt the need for a regular overview of the cultural life of the capital. The leading figures in the founding group were Edmond Picard and Octave Maus. The poet and art critic Émile Verhaeren (also a lawyer) soon became a frequent contributor.

Each issue was eight pages long, and reviews were unsigned. Initially the review's editorial line opposed "Art for art's sake" (promoted by the rival La Jeune Belgique) under the alternative slogan l'art social ("social art"), insisting that art should serve progressive social and political purposes. This stance was later softened. Despite the differences in editorial emphasis, several contributors wrote for both reviews.

L'Art Moderne was closely involved in promoting two fin de siècle Belgian art movements, Les XX and La Libre Esthétique.
