= Jef Lambeaux =

Belgian sculptor (1852–1908)

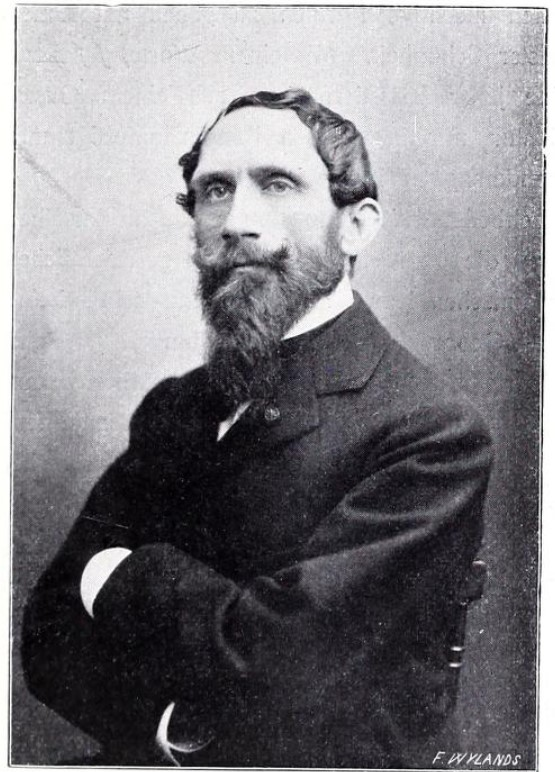
- Lambeaux
- Born: Joseph Marie Thomas Lambeaux; 14 January 1852; Antwerp, Belgium
- Died: 5 June 1908 (aged 56); Brussels, Belgium
- Known for: Sculpture
- Notable work: Temple of Human Passions

Jef Lambeaux (born Joseph Marie Thomas Lambeaux; 14 January 1852 – 5 June 1908) was a Belgian sculptor. His best known work is Pavilion of Human Passions, a colossal marble bas-relief.

== Early life and education ==
Lambeaux was born in Antwerp, Belgium, on 14 January 1852. He studied at the Antwerp Academy of Fine Arts, and was a pupil of Jean Geefs. He was part of a group of young artists, the "Van Beers clique", led by Jan van Beers. This group included the artists Piet Verhaert (1852–1908) and Alexander Struys (1852–1941). They were well known for their mischievous and eccentric behaviour, including walking around Antwerp dressed in historic costumes.

== Career ==
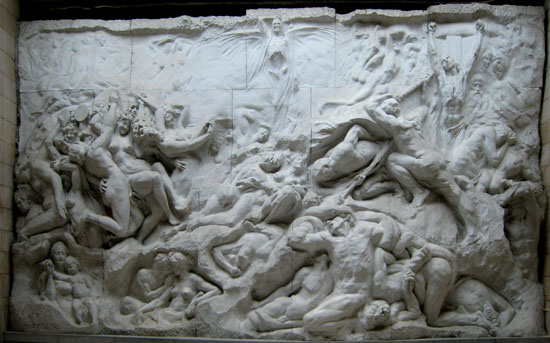
Temple of Human Passions (1898)

His first work, War, was exhibited in 1871, and was followed by a long series of humorous groups, including Children Dancing, Say Good Morning, The Lucky Number and; An Accident (1875). He then went to Paris, where he executed The Beggar and The Blini Pauper for the Belgian salons, and produced The Kiss (1881), generally regarded as his masterpiece. Claire J. R. Colinet – who would have great success during her career in the Art Deco era – was one of Lambeaux's students during his time in Paris. After visiting Italy, where he was much impressed by the works of Jean Boulogne, he showed a strong predilection for effects of force and motion.

Other notable works include his Brabo Fountain in Antwerp (1886), Robbing the Eagles Eyrie (1890), Drunkenness (1893), The Triumph of Woman, The Bitten Faun (which created a great stir at the Exposition Universelle at Liège in 1905), and The Human Passions, a colossal marble bas-relief, elaborated from a sketch exhibited in 1889. Of his numerous busts may be mentioned those of Hendrik Conscience, and of Charles Buls, the burgomaster of Brussels.

=== Temple of Human Passions ===
Lambeaux didn't escape the wrath of art critics when he showed a life-size model of Temple of Human Passions at the Salon Triennial in Ghent in 1889. The sculpture managed to attract such fury and uproar that in 1890 the journal L’Art Moderne described the work as follows:

[It is] a pile of naked and contorted bodies, muscled wrestlers in delirium, an absolute and incomparable childish concept. It is at once chaotic and vague, bloated and pretentious, pompous and empty. And what if, instead of paying for 300,000 francs of "passions", the government simply bought works of art?

== Death ==
Lambeaux died on 5 June 1908 in Brussels.

== Honours ==
- 1887: Knight in the Order of Leopold.

== Gallery ==
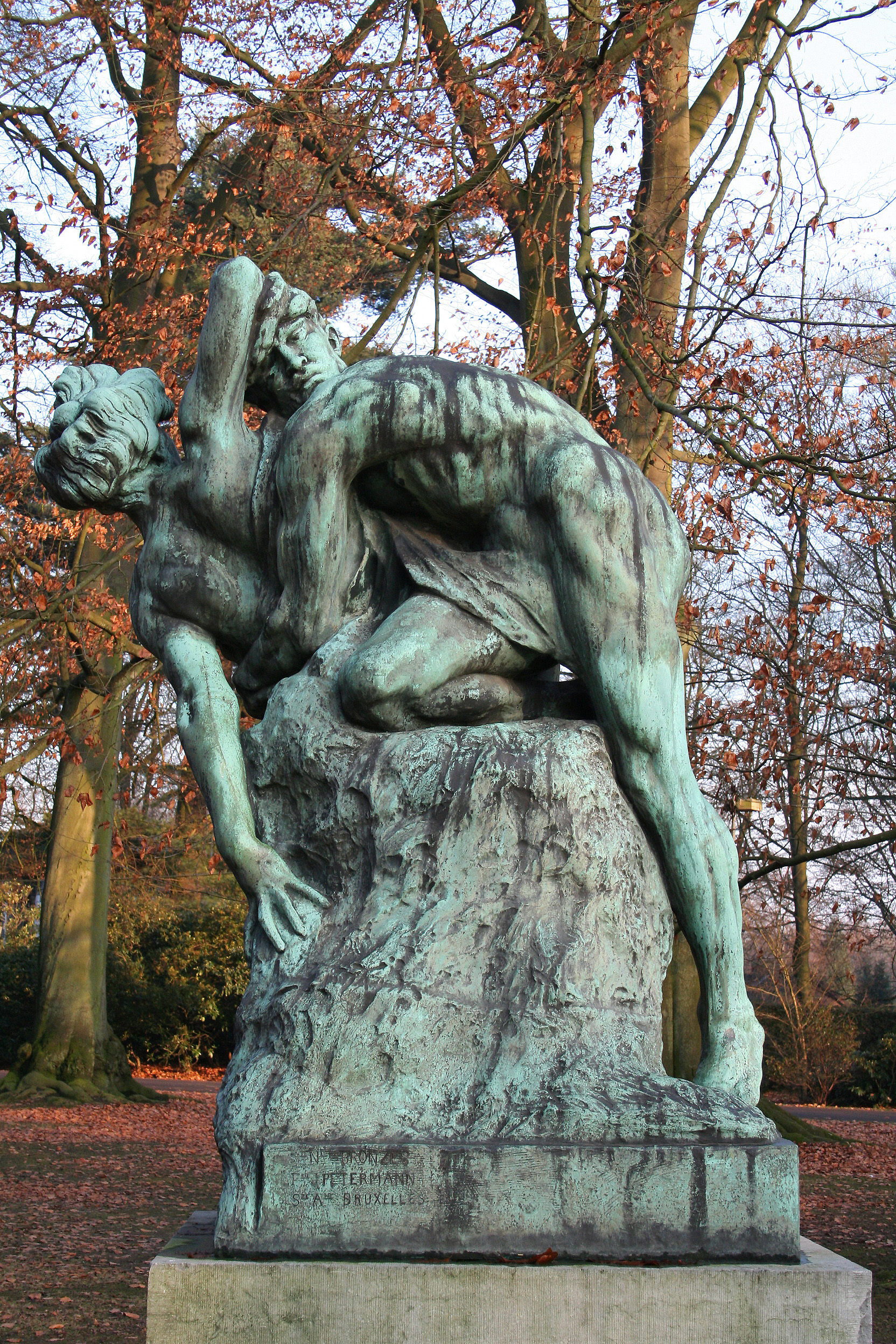
Le Triomphe de la Femme (1901)

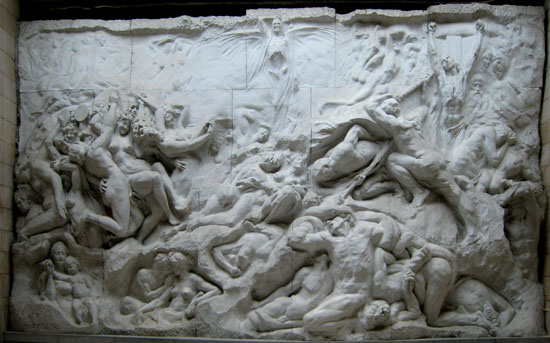
Temple of Human Passions (1898)

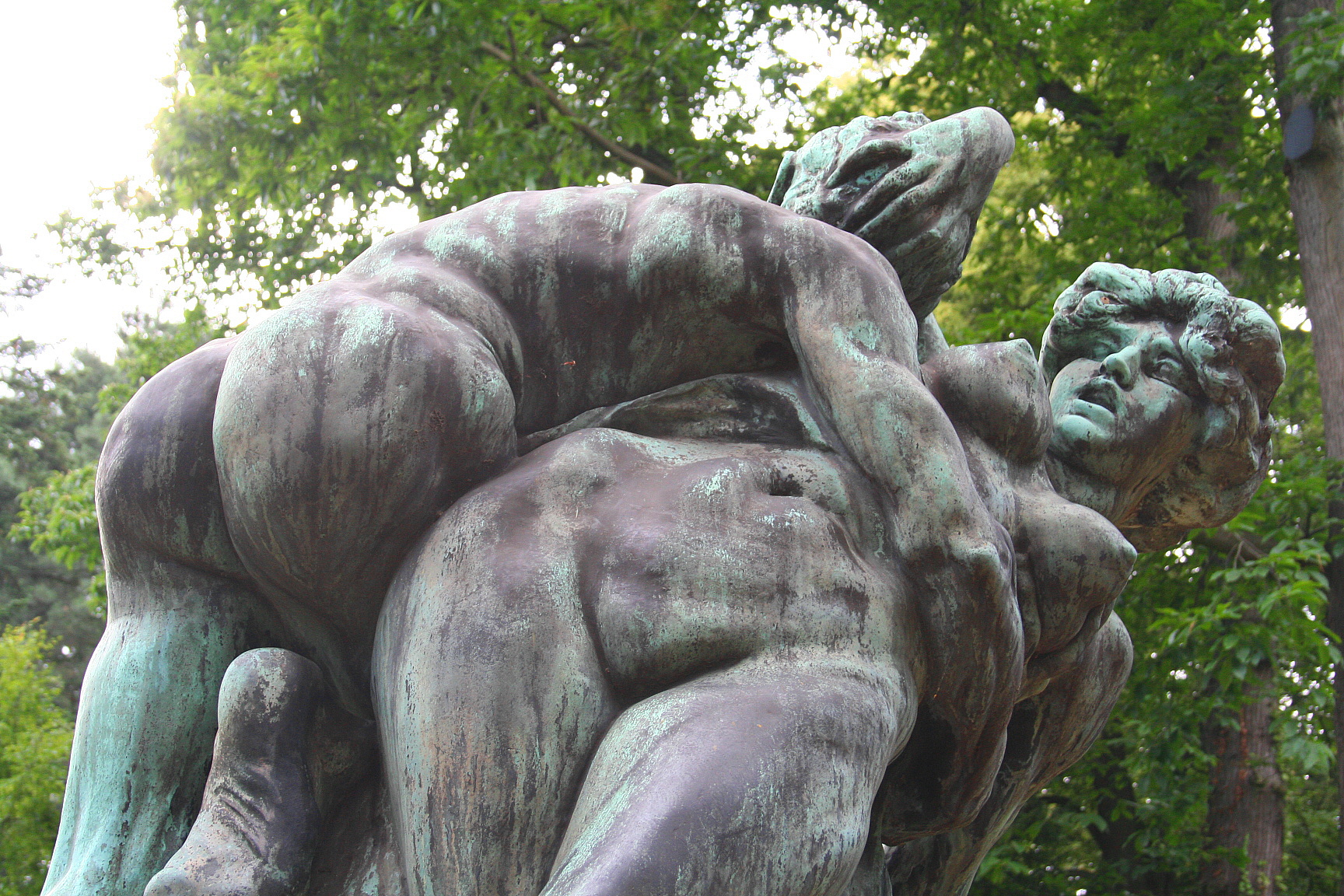
Le Triomphe de la Femme (1901)

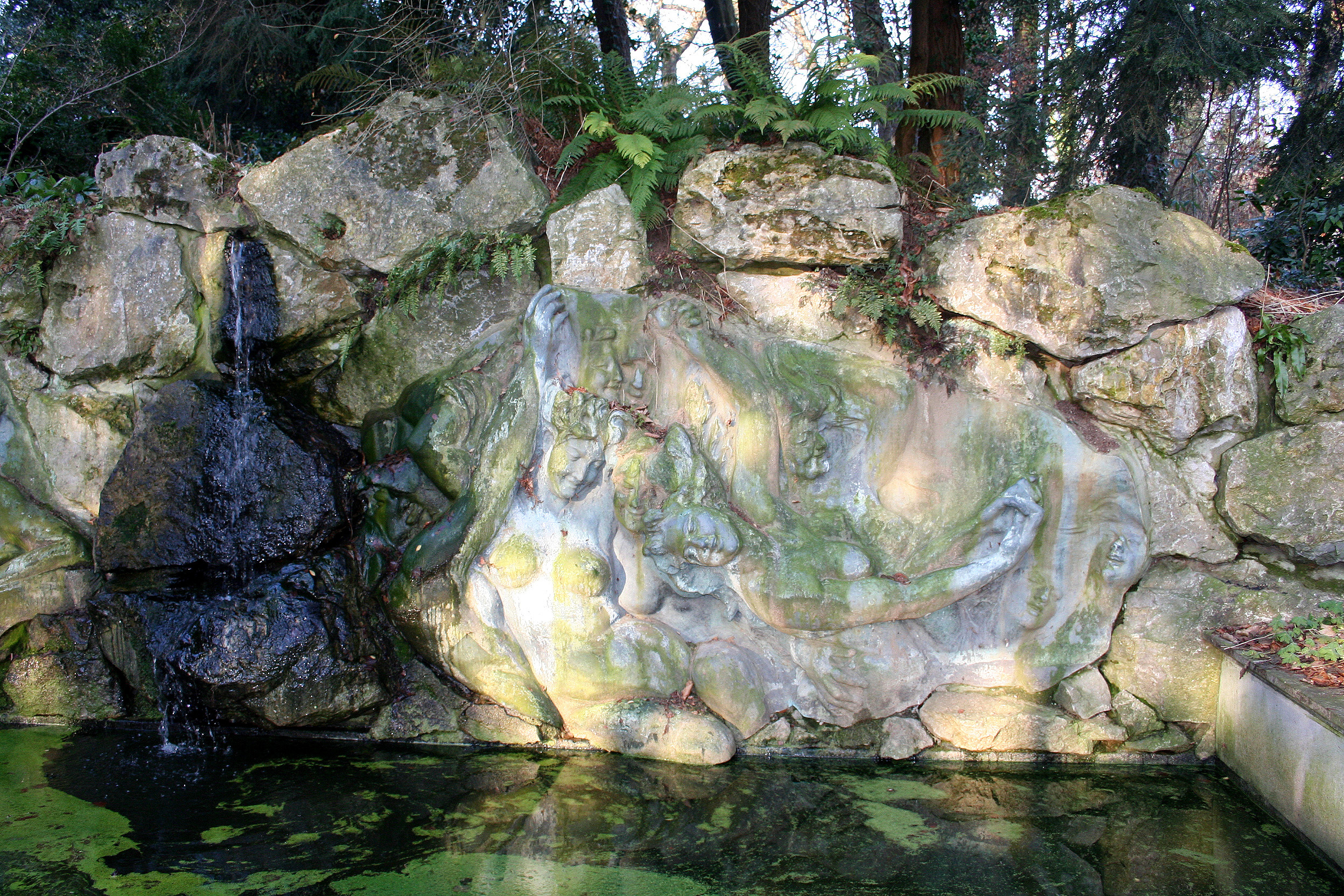
The Joy bas relief fragment of The Human Passions

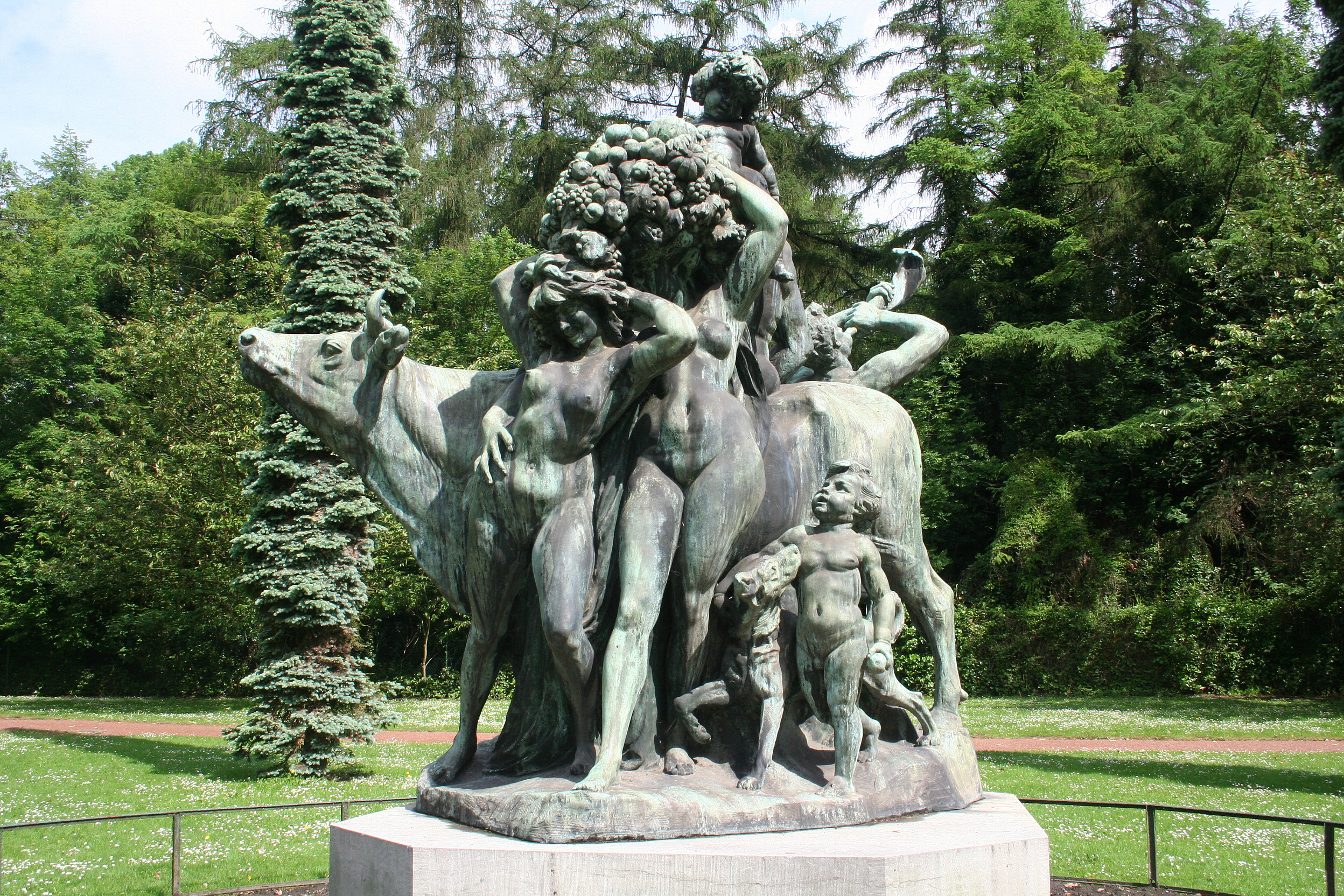
L'Abondance (1902)

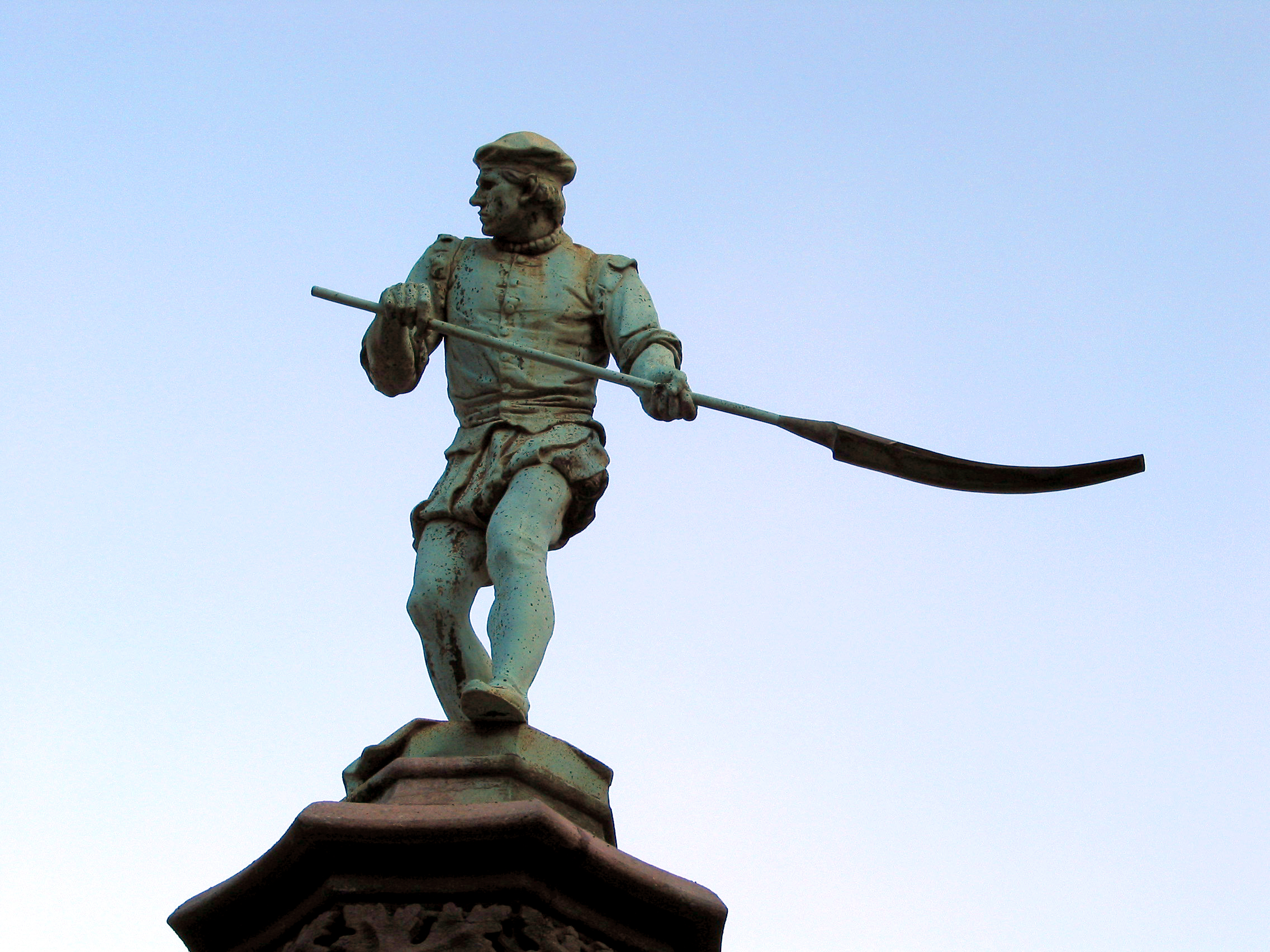
Le Blanchisseur (English: launderer or bleacher)

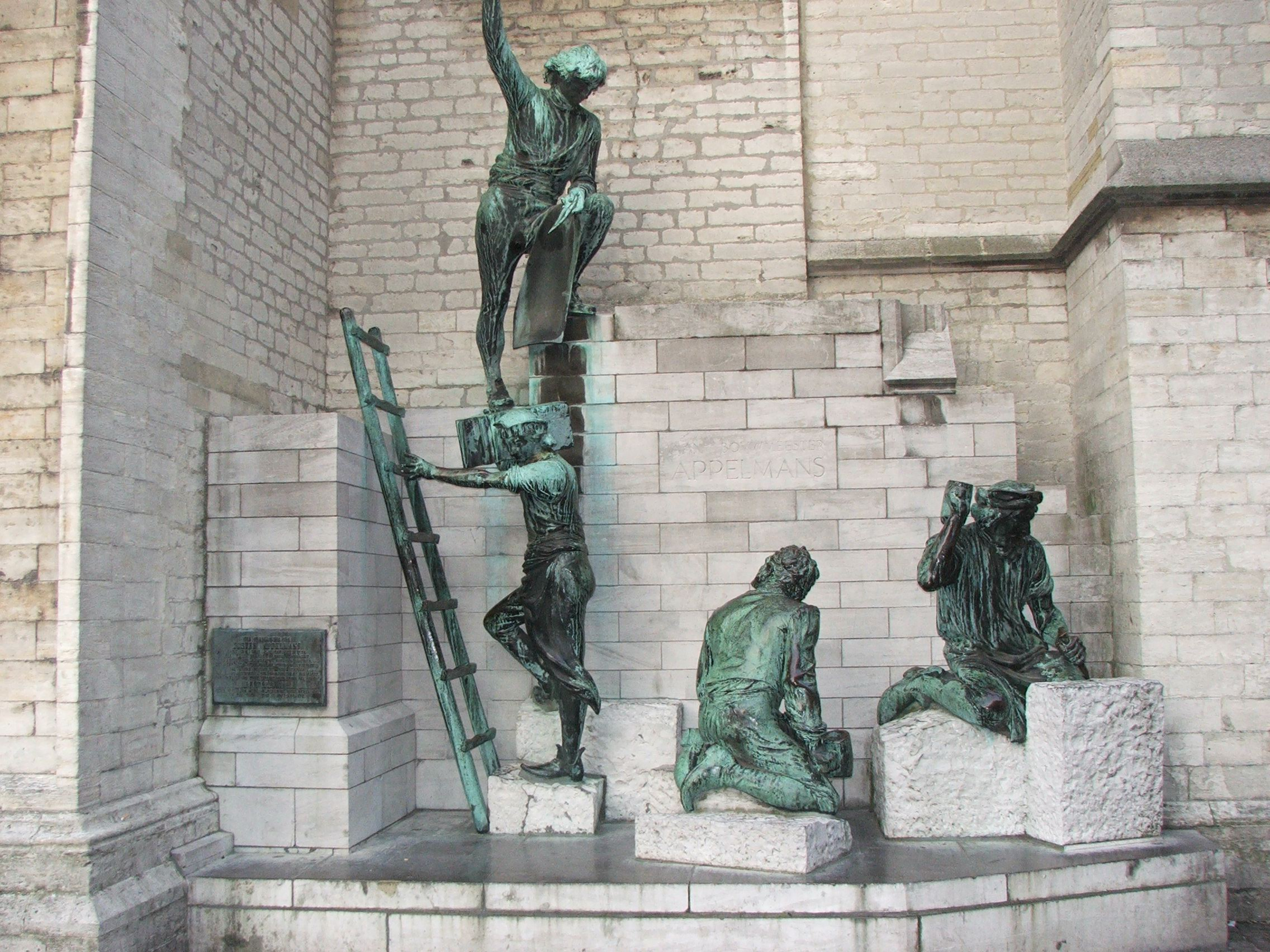
Cathedral of Our Lady, Antwerp

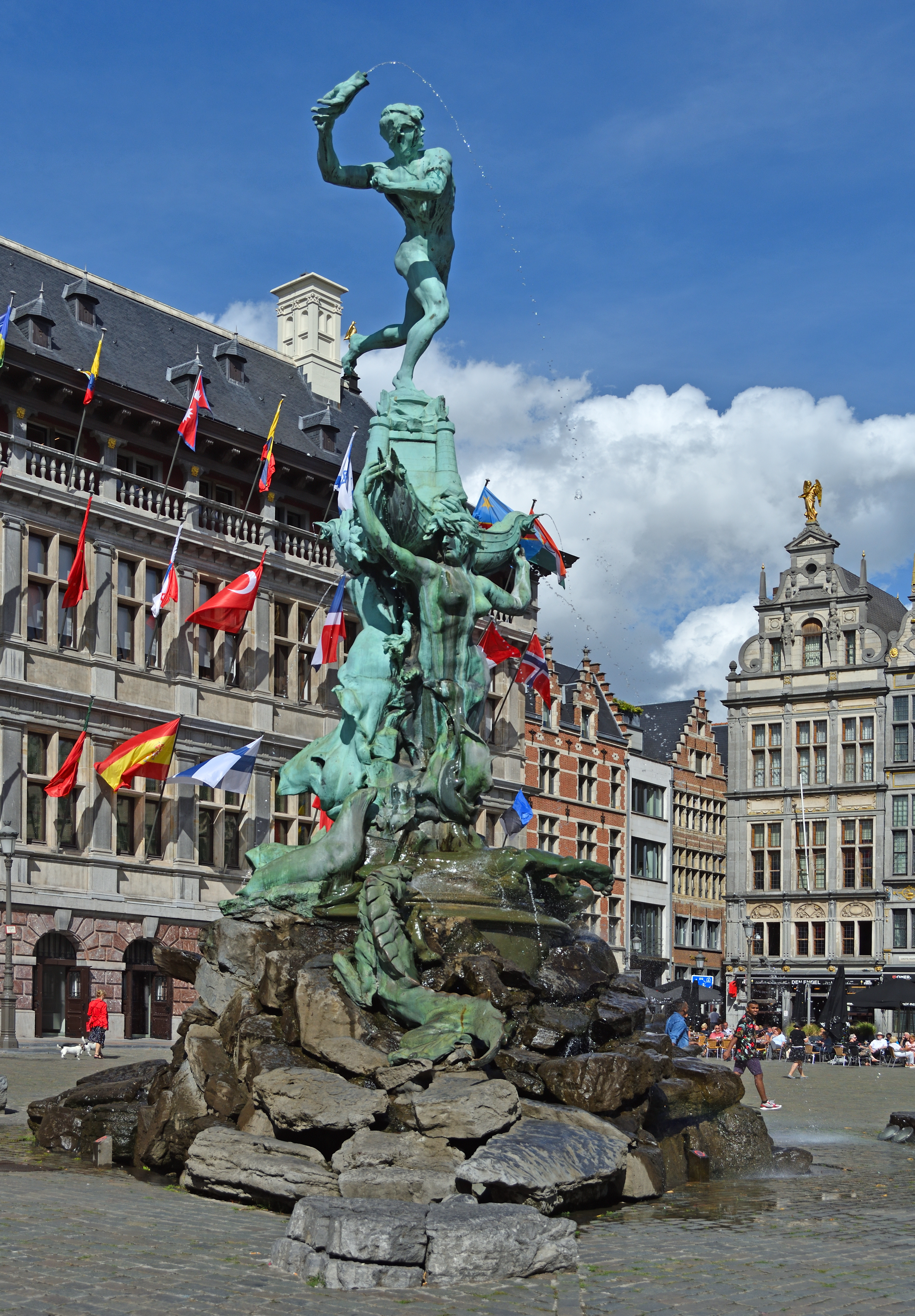
Brabo (1886)

== Jef Lambeaux Museum ==
In 2006 the association "ASBL Musée Jef Lambeaux" was set up to promote the creation of a museum dedicated to the artist in Saint-Gilles, Belgium. The museum was already promised by the municipality of Saint-Gilles in 1898 but never built.

== Notes ==
Alain Jacobs, https://collections.heritage.brussels/fr/objects/42758 [archive]https://collections.heritage.brussels/fr/objects/42760 [archive] https://collections.heritage.brussels/fr/objects/4275 [archive]9 [archive]https://collections.heritage.brussels/fr/objects/42761 [archive]
