= Religious architecture =

Architectural practices used in places of worship

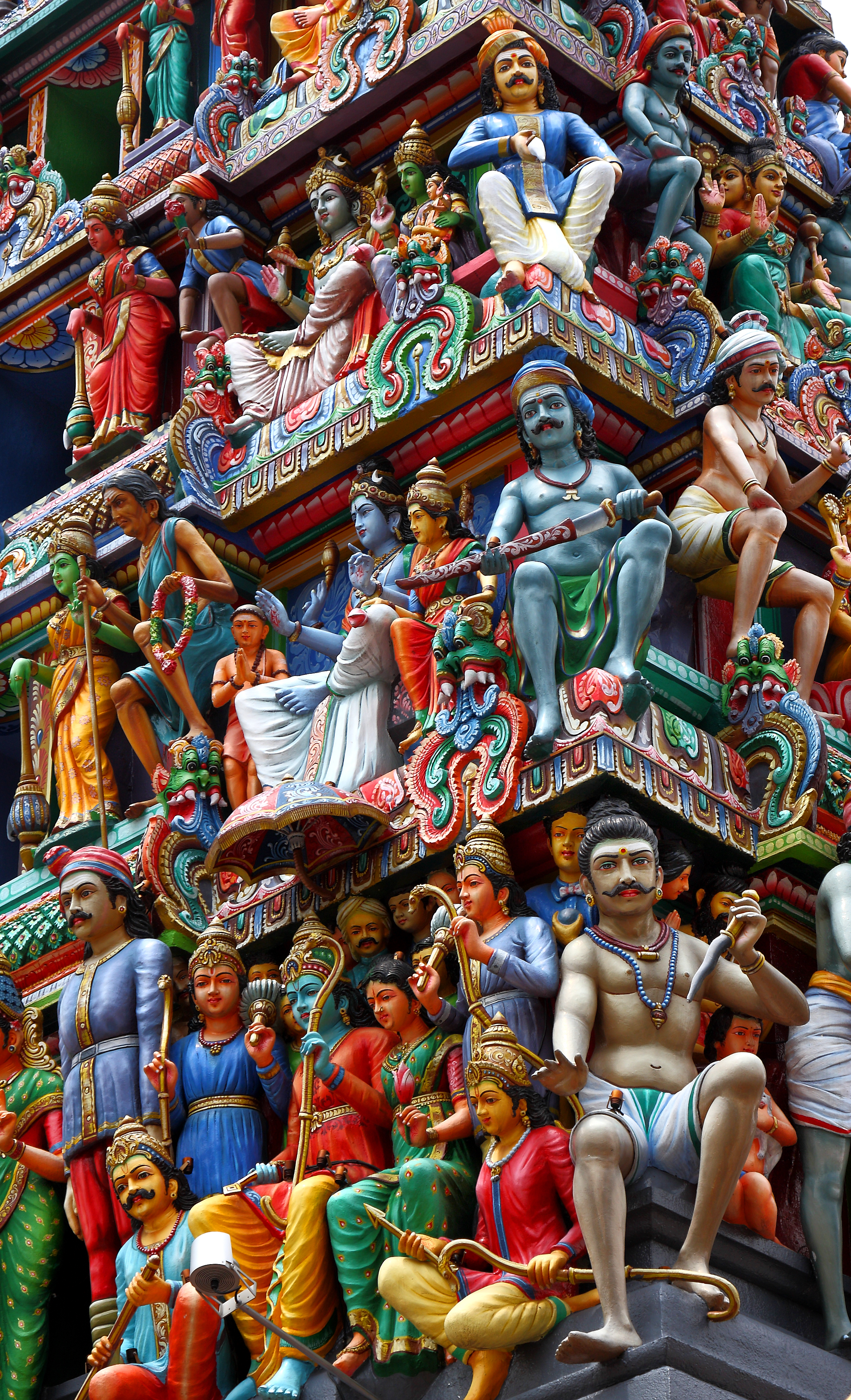
Ornate details on the entrance tower of Sri Mariamman Temple, Singapore

Religious architecture (also known as sacred architecture or sacral architecture) is a religious architectural practice concerned with the design and construction of places of worship or sacred or intentional space, such as churches, mosques, stupas, synagogues, and temples. Many cultures devoted considerable resources to their sacred architecture and places of worship. Religious and sacred spaces are amongst the most impressive and permanent monolithic buildings created by humanity. Conversely, sacred architecture as a locale for meta-intimacy may also be non-monolithic, ephemeral and intensely private, personal and non-public. Sacred, religious and holy structures often evolved over centuries and were the largest buildings in the world, prior to the modern skyscraper. While the various styles employed in sacred architecture sometimes reflected trends in other structures, these styles also remained unique from the contemporary architecture used in other structures. With the rise of Christianity and Islam, religious buildings increasingly became centres of worship, prayer and meditation. The Western scholarly discipline of the history of architecture itself closely follows the history of religious architecture from ancient times until the Baroque period, at least. Sacred geometry, iconography, and the use of sophisticated semiotics such as signs, symbols and religious motifs are endemic to sacred architecture.

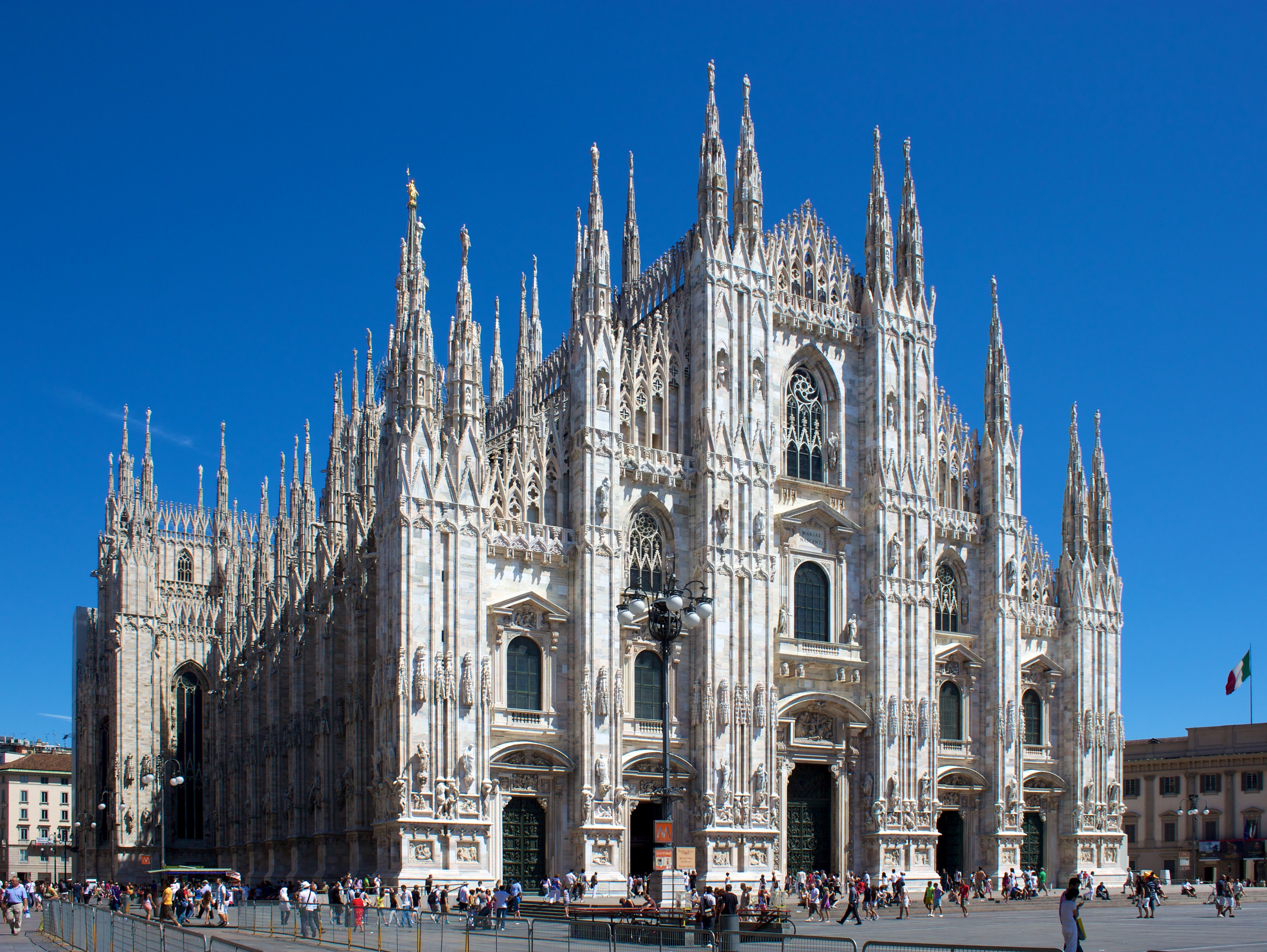
Milan Cathedral is a Gothic church in Italy

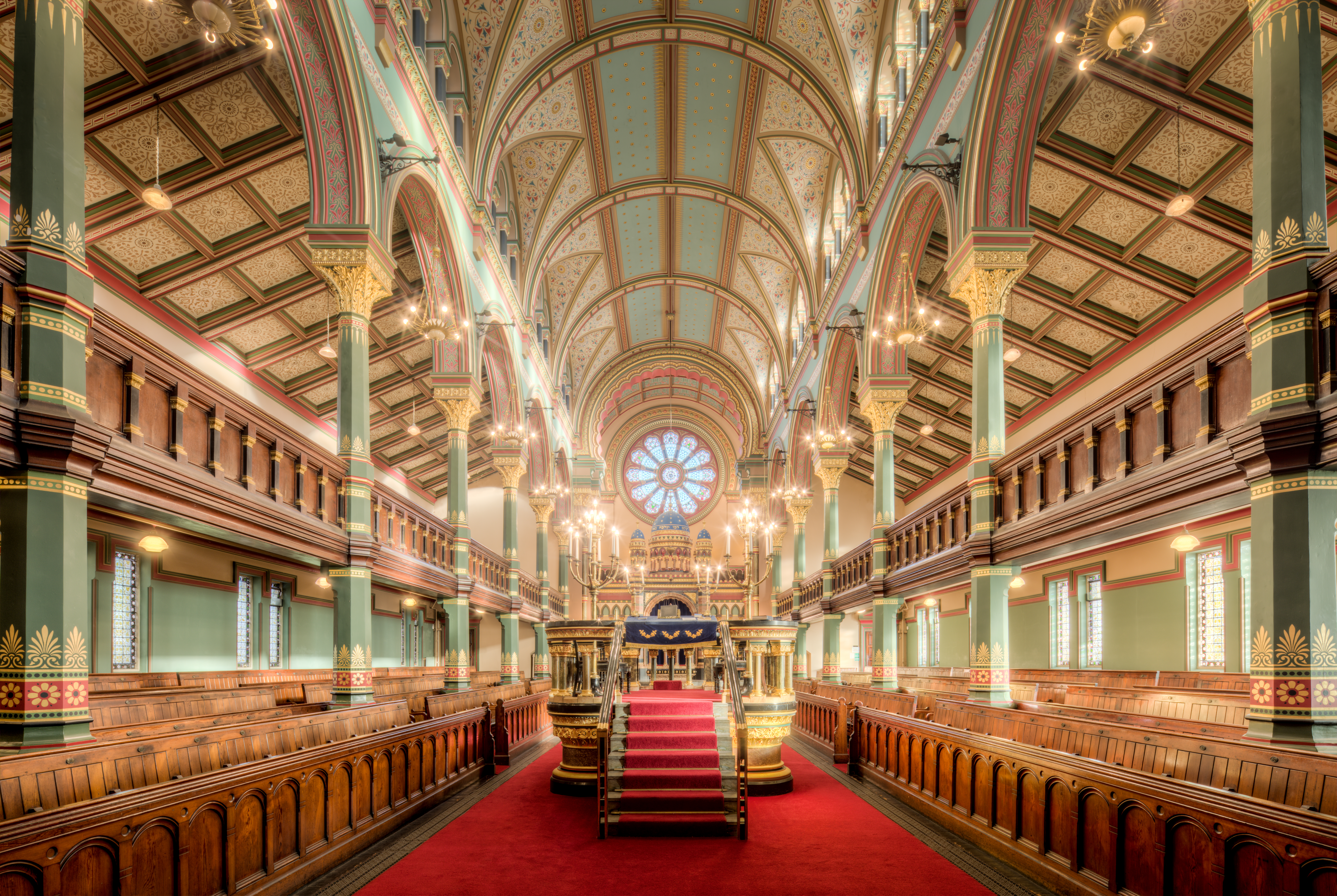
Bimah of Princes Road Synagogue in Liverpool, England

== Spiritual aspects of religious architecture ==
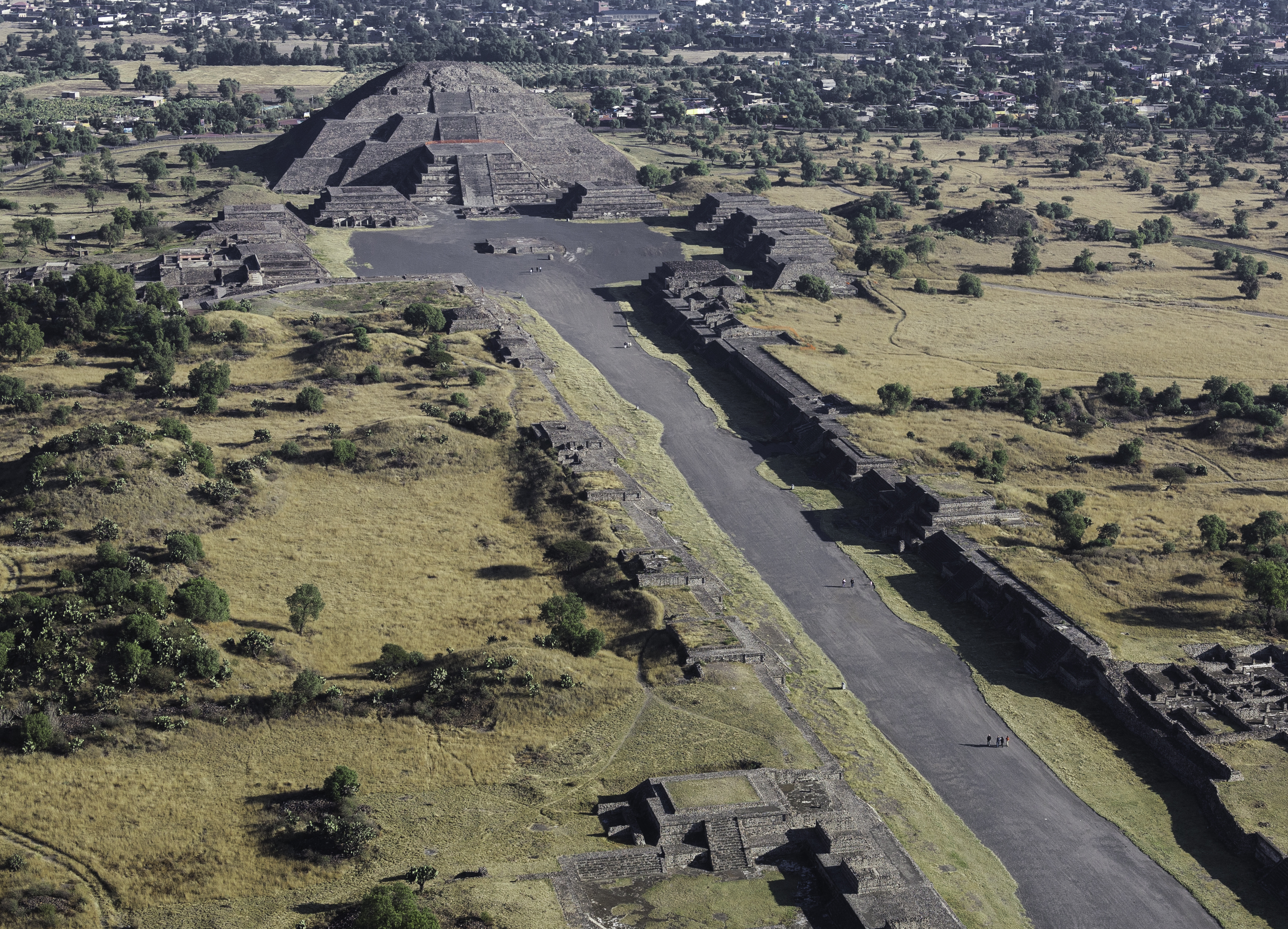
Teotihuacán's Pyramid of the Moon was used for ritual sacrifice

Sacred or religious architecture is sometimes called sacred space.

Architect Norman L. Koonce has suggested that the goal of sacred architecture is to make "transparent the boundary between matter and mind, flesh and the spirit." In discussing sacred architecture, Protestant minister Robert Schuller suggested that "to be psychologically healthy, human beings need to experience their natural setting—the setting we were designed for, which is the garden." Meanwhile, Richard Kieckhefer suggests that entering into a religious building is a metaphor for entering into spiritual relationship. Kieckhefer suggests that sacred space can be analyzed by three factors affecting spiritual process: longitudinal space emphasizes the procession and return of sacramental acts, auditorium space is suggestive of proclamation and response, and new forms of communal space designed for gathering and return depend to a great degree on minimized scale to enhance intimacy and participation in worship. The scholar of religious studies Florin George Călian affirms that "the sacred space is the place where the transcendent becomes immanent, and where the devotee can access God."

== Ancient architecture ==
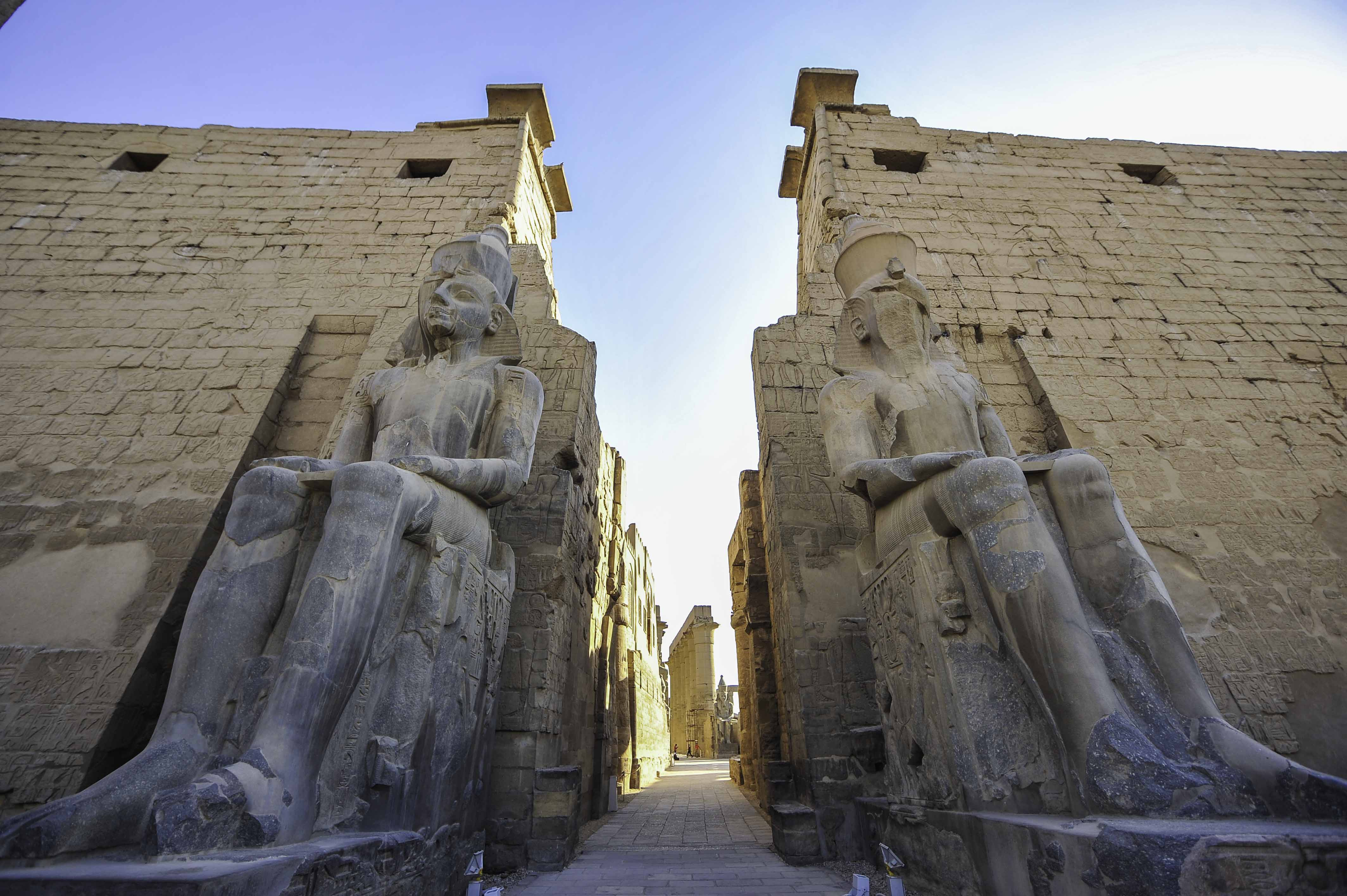
The Egyptian Luxor Temple, constructed about 3400 years ago

Sacred architecture spans a number of ancient architectural styles including Neolithic architecture, ancient Egyptian architecture and Sumerian architecture. Ancient religious buildings, particularly temples, were often viewed as the dwelling place, the temenos of the gods and were used as the site of various kinds of sacrifice. Ancient tombs and burial structures are also examples of architectural structures reflecting religious beliefs of their various societies. The Temple of Karnak at Thebes, Egypt was constructed across a period of 1300 years and its numerous temples comprise what may be the largest religious structure ever built. Ancient Egyptian religious architecture has fascinated archaeologists and captured the public imagination for millennia.

=== Classical architecture ===
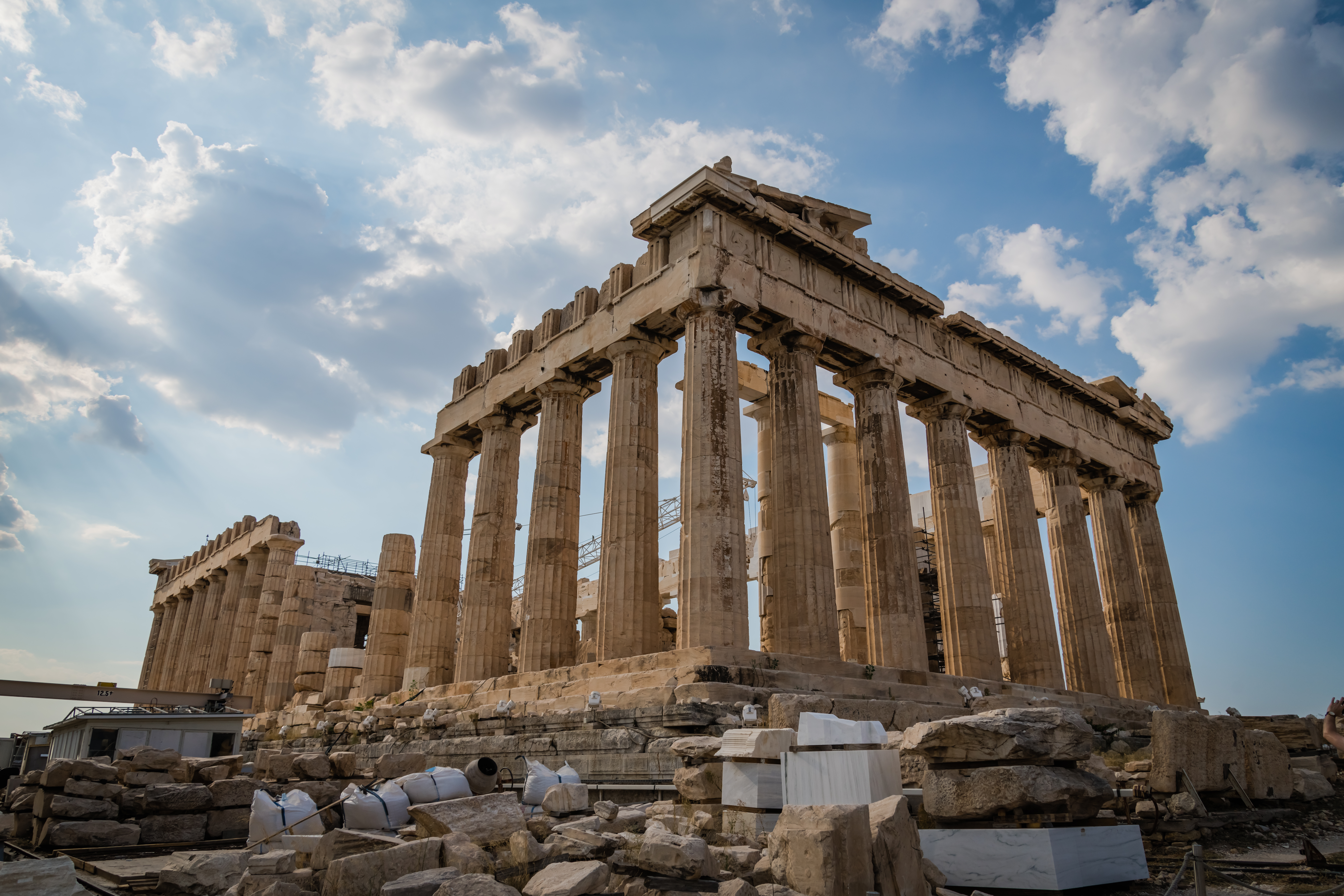
The Parthenon in Athens, Greece.

Around 600 BCE the wooden columns of the Temple of Hera at Olympia were replaced by stone columns. With the spread of this process to other sanctuary structures a few stone buildings have survived through the ages. Since temples are the only buildings which survive in numbers, most of our concept of classical architecture is based on religious structures. The Parthenon, which served as a treasury building as well as a place for veneration of deity, is widely regarded as the greatest example of classical architecture.

== Indian religions ==
Indian architecture is related to the history and religions of the time periods as well as to the geography and geology of the Indian subcontinent. India was crisscrossed by trading routes of merchants from as far away as Siraf and China as well as weathering invasions by foreigners, resulting in multiple influences of foreign elements on native styles. The diversity of Indian culture is represented in its architecture. Indian architecture comprises a blend of ancient and varied native traditions, with building types, forms and technologies from West, Central Asia, and Europe.

=== Buddhism ===
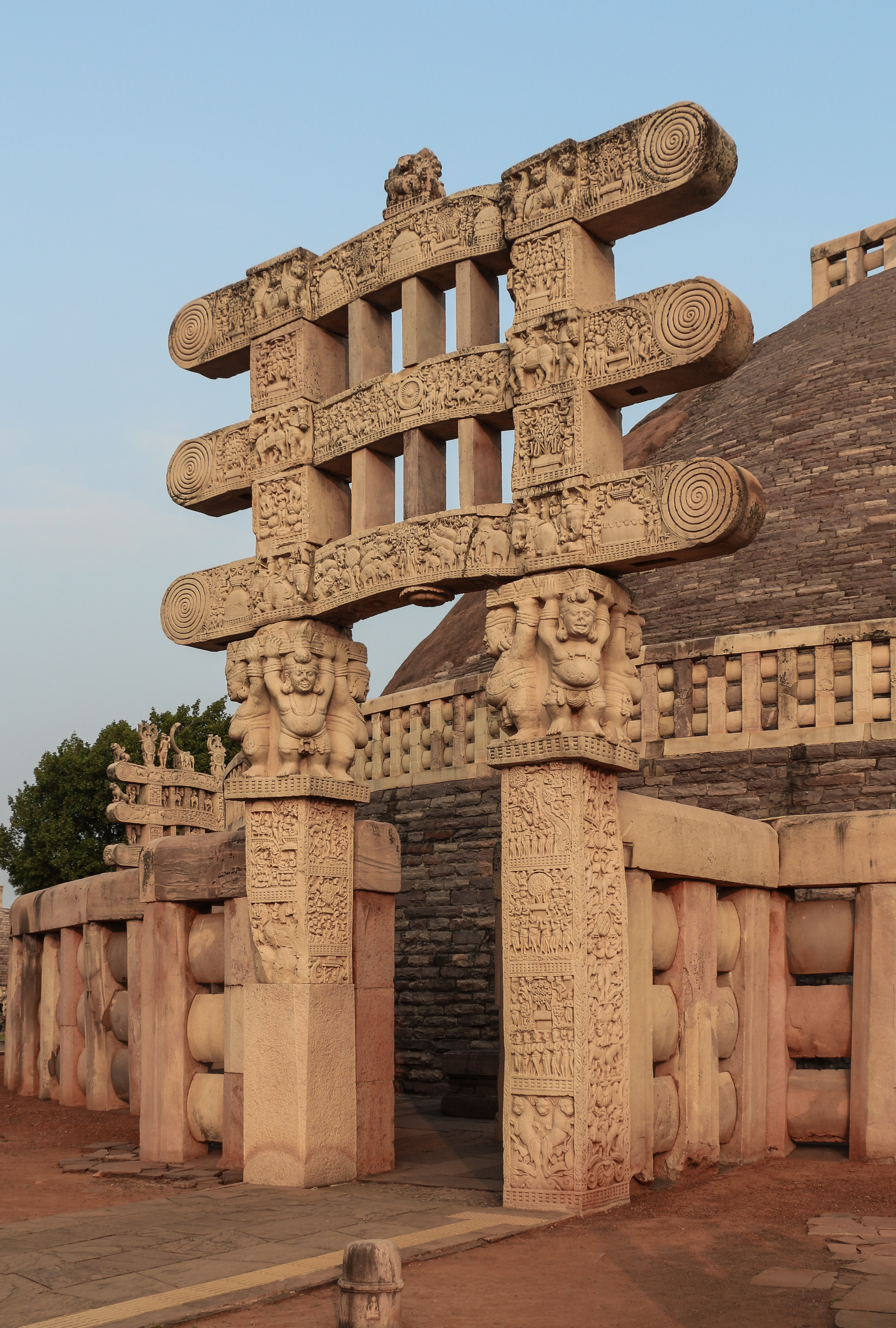
West Torana of Sanchi

Buddhist architecture developed in South Asia beginning in the third century BCE. Two types of structures are associated with early Buddhism: viharas and stupas. Originally, Viharas were temporary shelters used by wandering monks during the rainy season, but these structures later developed to accommodate the growing and increasingly formalized Buddhist monasticism. An existing example is at Nalanda (Bihar).

The initial function of the stupa was the veneration and safe-guarding of the relics of the Buddha. The earliest existing example of a stupa is in Sanchi (Madhya Pradesh). In accordance with changes in religious practice, stupas were gradually incorporated into chaitya-grihas (stupa halls). These reached their highpoint in the first century BCE, exemplified by the cave complexes of Ajanta and Ellora (Maharashtra).

The pagoda is an evolution of the Indian stupa that is marked by a tiered tower with multiple eaves common in China, Japan, Korea, Nepal and other parts of Asia. Buddhist temples were developed rather later and outside South Asia, where Buddhism gradually declined from the early centuries CE onwards, though an early example is that of the Mahabodhi Temple at Bodh Gaya in Bihar. The architectural structure of the stupa spread across Asia, taking on many diverse forms as details specific to different regions were incorporated into the overall design. It was spread to China and the Asian region by Araniko, a Nepali architect in the early 13th century for Kublai Khan.

=== Hinduism ===
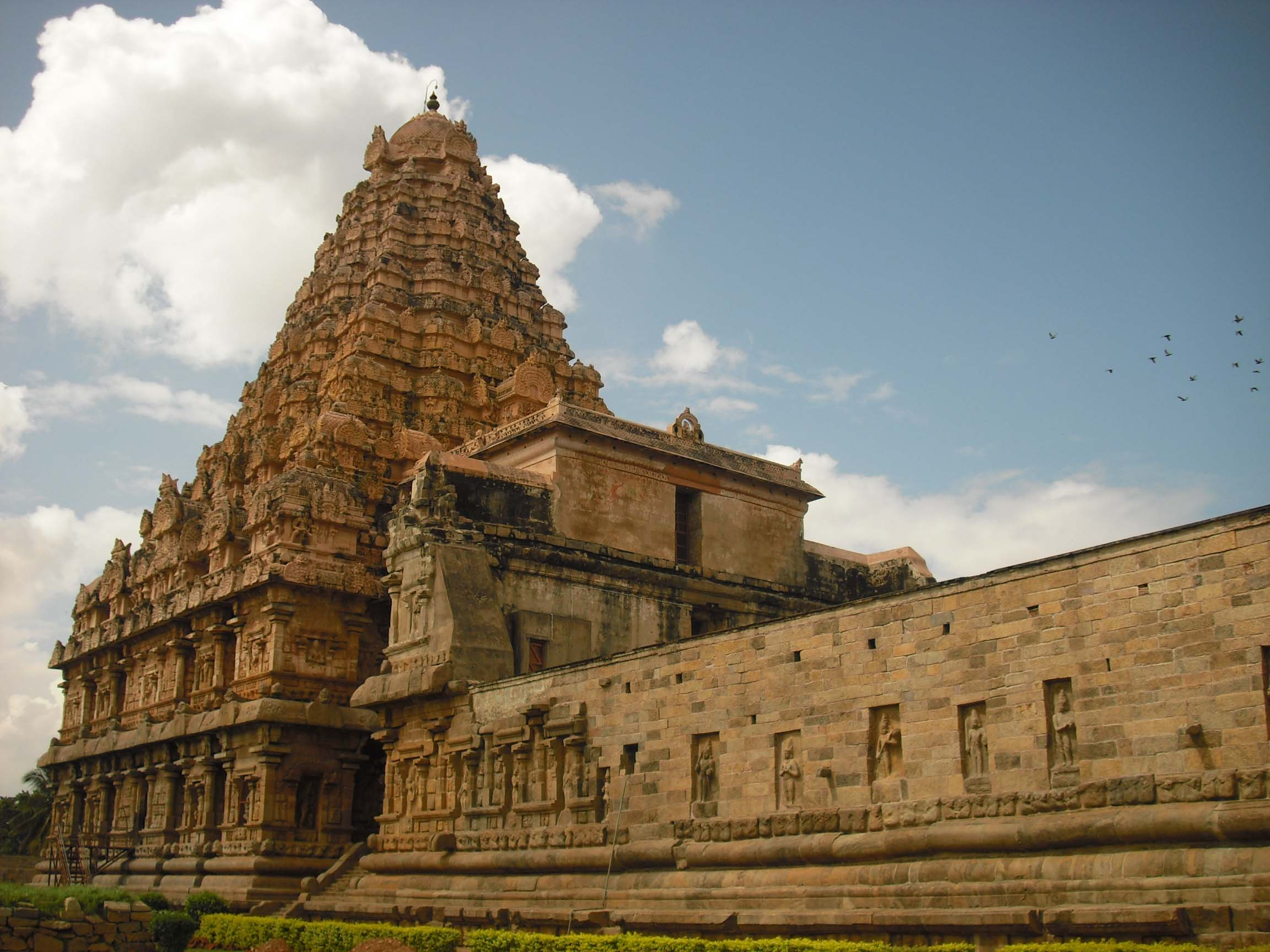
The Brihadeeswarar Temple, Gangaikonda Cholapuram, built in the Dravidian style

Hindu temple architecture is based on Sthapatya Veda and many other ancient religious texts like the Brihat Samhita, Vastu Shastra, and Shilpa Shastras in accordance to the design principles and guidelines believed to have been laid by the divine architect Vishvakarma. It evolved over a period of more than 2000 years. The Hindu architecture conforms to strict religious models that incorporate elements of astronomy and sacred geometry. In Hindu belief, the temple represents the macrocosm of the universe as well as the microcosm of inner space. While the underlying form of Hindu temple architecture follows strict traditions, considerable variation occurs with the often intense decorative embellishments and ornamentation.

== Christian architecture ==
=== Byzantine architecture ===
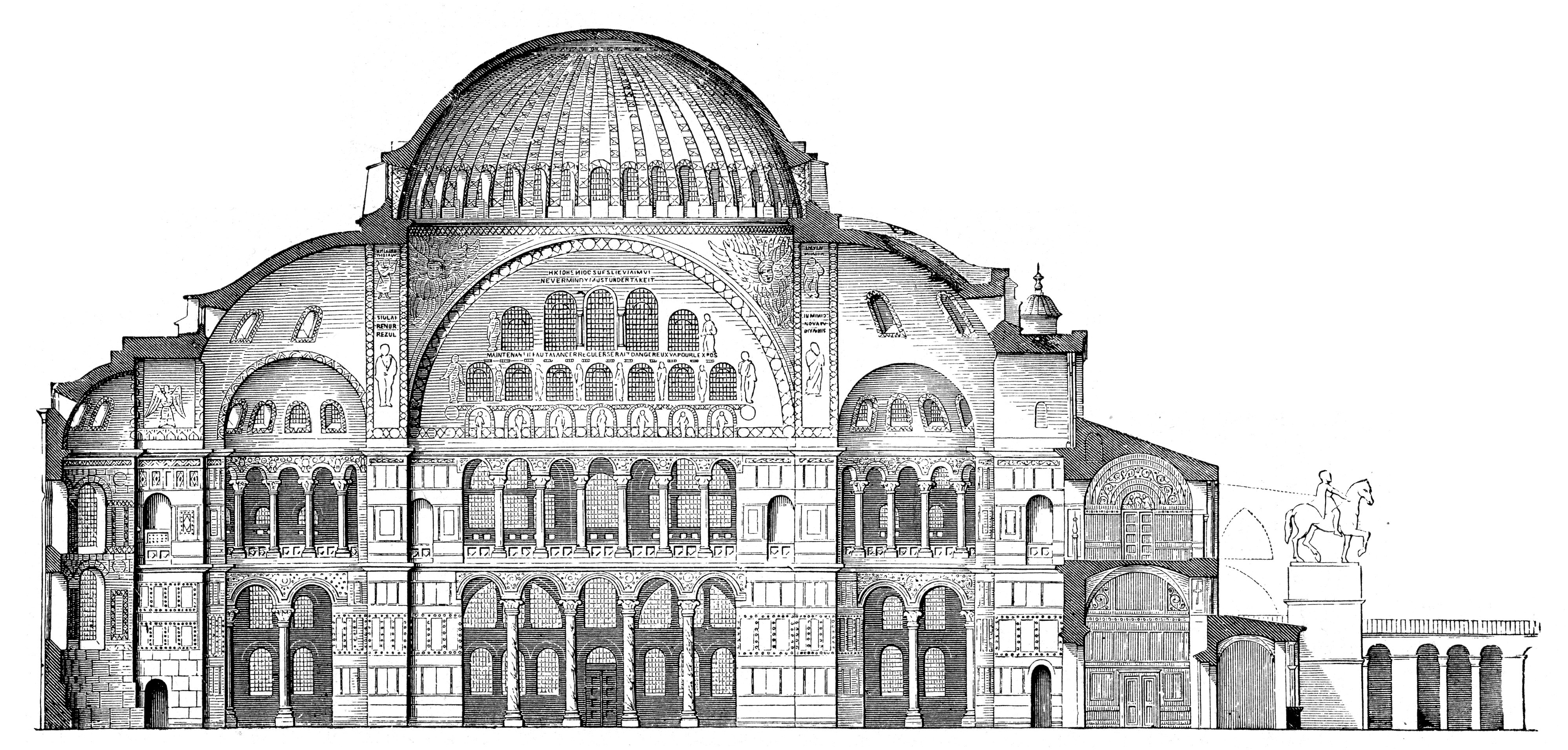
Hagia Sophia, the Church of Holy Wisdom, in Istanbul, Turkey

Byzantine architecture evolved from Roman architecture. Eventually, a style emerged incorporating Near East influences and the Greek cross plan for church design. In addition, brick replaced stone, classical order was less strictly observed, mosaics replaced carved decoration, and complex domes were erected.

One of the great breakthroughs in the history of Western architecture occurred when Justinian I's architects invented a complex system providing a smooth transition from a square plan of the church to a circular dome (or domes) by means of squinches or pendentives. The prime example of early Byzantine religious architecture is the Hagia Sophia in Istanbul.

=== European medieval architecture ===
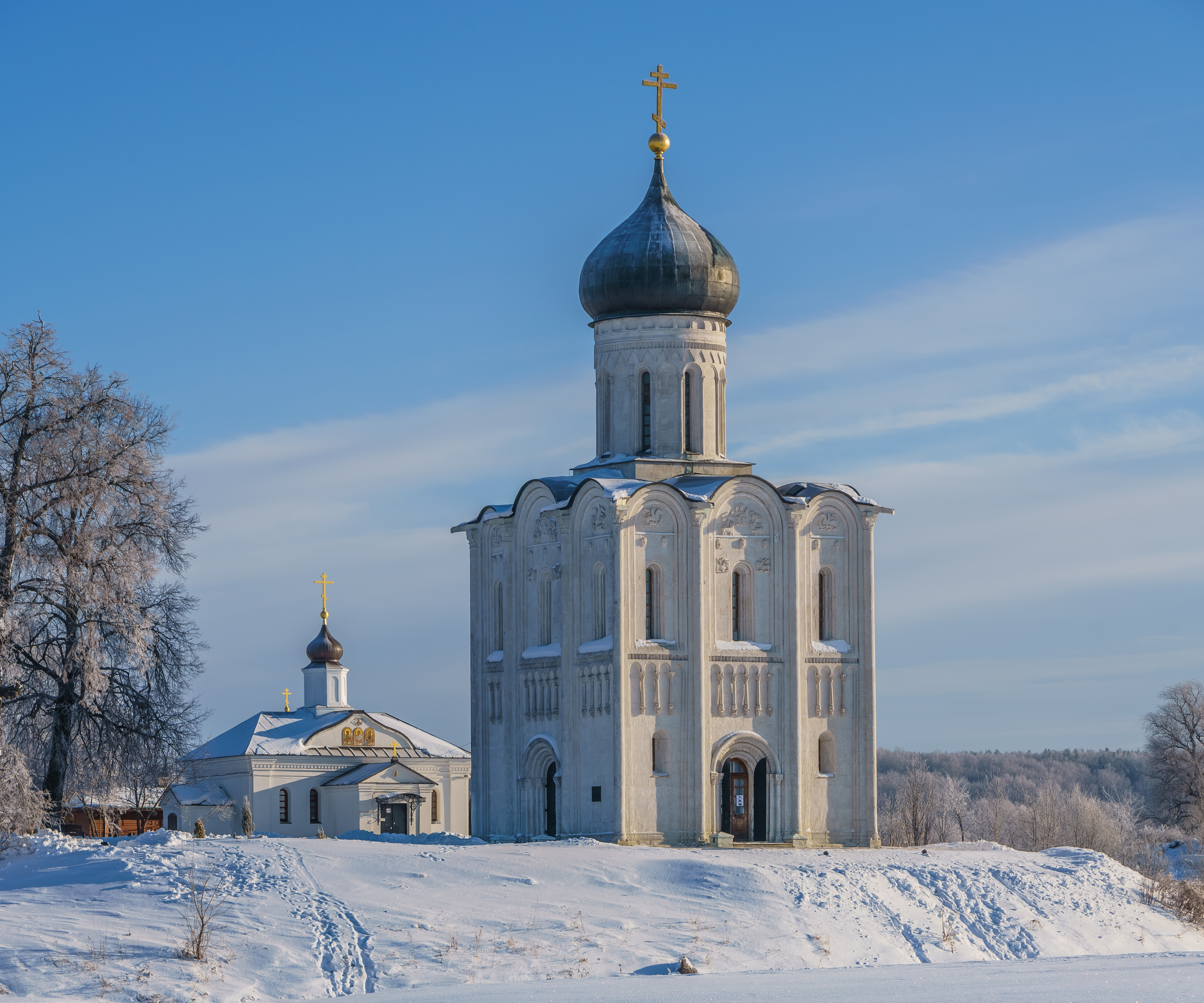
Church of the Intercession on the Nerl

The religious architecture of Christian churches in the Middle Ages featured the Latin cross plan, which takes the Roman basilica as its primary model, with subsequent developments. It consists of a nave and transepts, and the altar stands at the east end (see cathedral diagram). Also, cathedrals influenced or commissioned by Justinian I employed the Byzantine style of domes and a Greek cross (resembling a plus sign), centering attention on the altar at the center of the church. The Church of the Intercession on the Nerl is an excellent example of Russian orthodox architecture in the Middle Ages. The Urnes stave church (Urnes stavkyrkje) in Norway is a superb example of a medieval stave church.

=== Gothic architecture ===
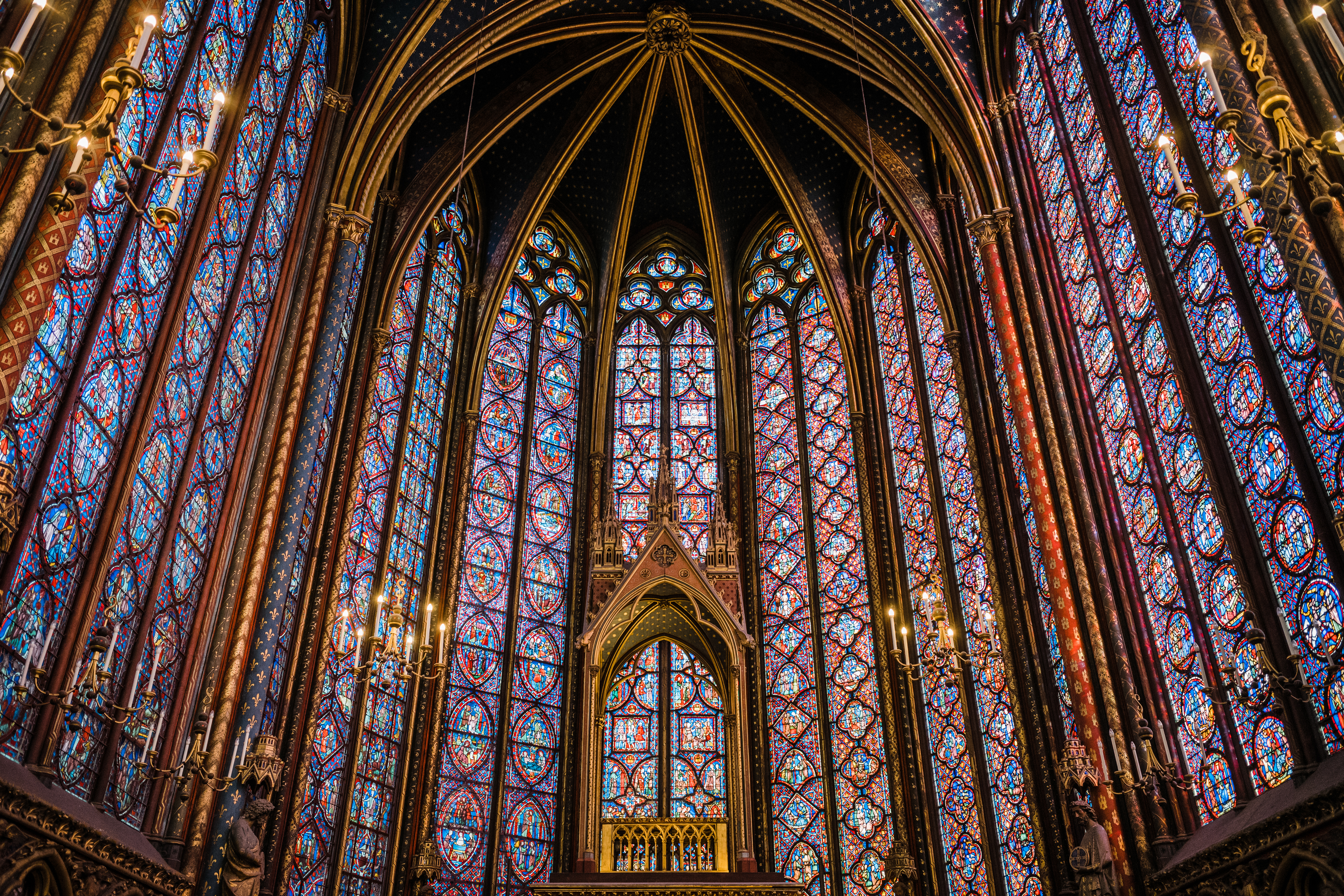
Interior of Sainte-Chapelle

Gothic architecture was particularly associated with cathedrals and other churches, which flourished in Europe during the high and late medieval period. Originating in 12th century France, it was known during the period as Opus Francigenum ("French work"). The style originated at the abbey church of Saint-Denis in Saint-Denis, near Paris. Other notable Gothic religious structures include Notre-Dame de Paris, the Cathedral of Our Lady of Amiens, and the Chartres Cathedral.

=== Renaissance architecture ===
The Florence Cathedral

The Renaissance brought a return of classical influence and a new emphasis on rational clarity. Renaissance architecture represents a conscious revival of Roman architecture with its symmetry, mathematical proportions, and geometric order. Filippo Brunelleschi's plan for the dome of the Florence Cathedral in 1418 was one of the first important religious architectural designs of the Italian Renaissance architecture.

=== Baroque architecture ===
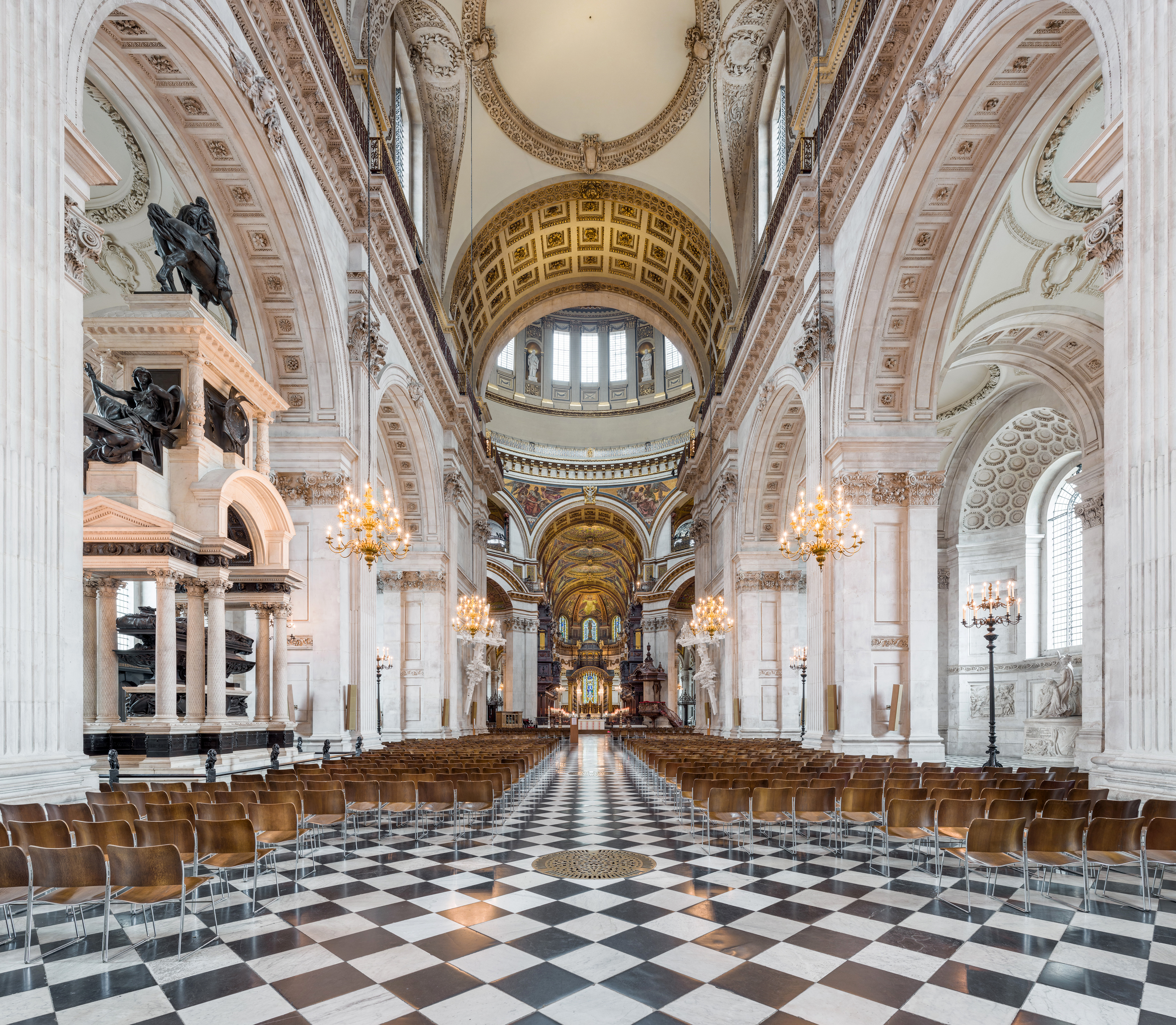
Interior of St Paul's Cathedral

The evolution from Renaissance to Baroque appeared most notably in religious art and architecture. Most architectural historians regard Michelangelo's design of St. Peter's Basilica in Rome as a precursor to the Baroque style; this can be recognized by broader interior spaces (replacing long narrow naves), more playful attention to light and shadow, extensive ornamentation, large frescoes, focus on interior art, and frequently, a dramatic central exterior projection. The most important early example of Baroque architecture was the Santa Susanna by Carlo Maderno. St Paul's Cathedral in London by Christopher Wren is regarded as the prime example of the rather late influence of the Baroque style in England.

=== Mormon temples ===
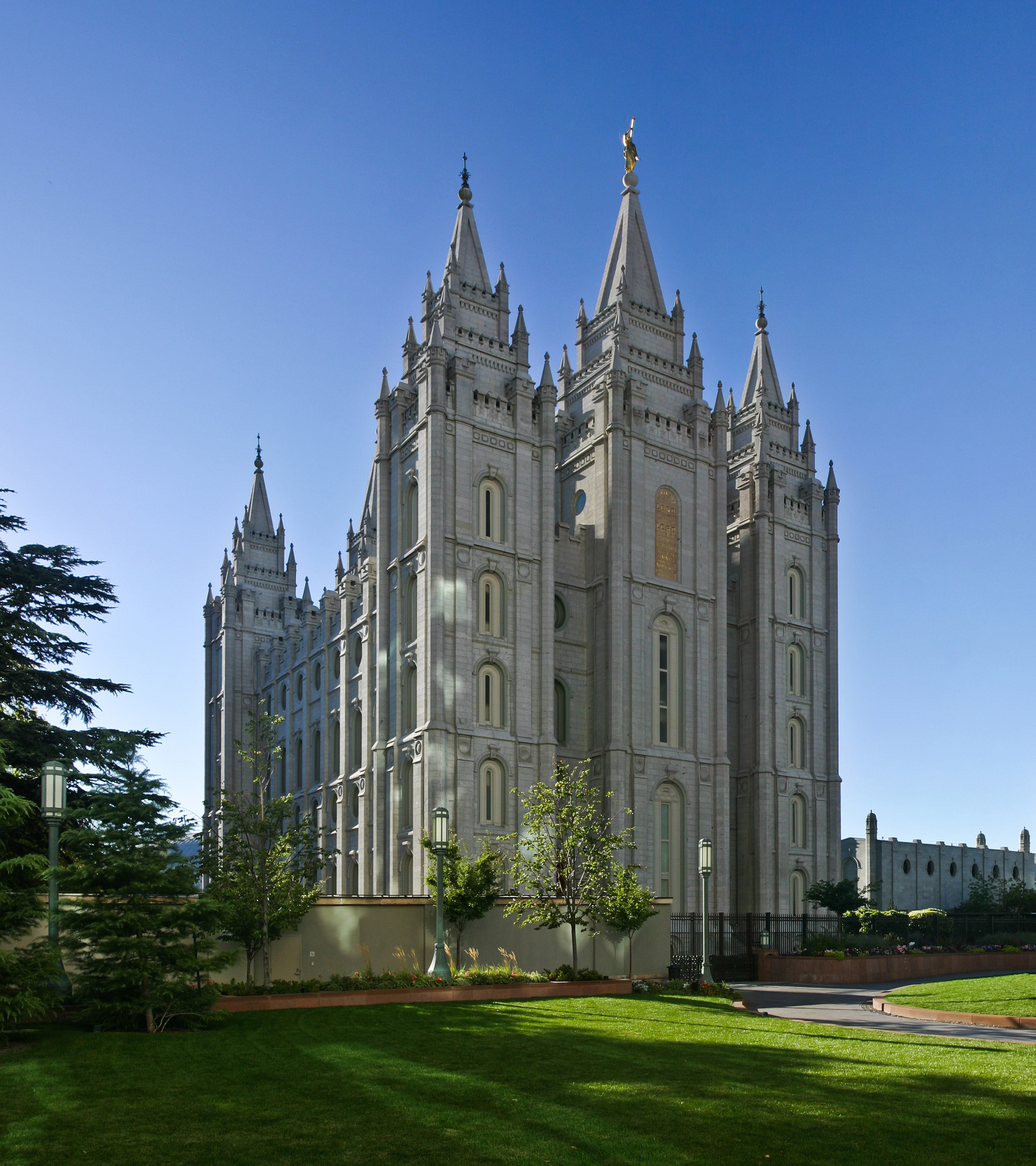
Salt Lake Temple, in Salt Lake City, Utah

Temples of the Church of Jesus Christ of Latter-day Saints offer a unique look at design as it has changed from the simple church-like structure of the Kirtland Temple built in the 1830s, to the castellated Gothic styles of the early Utah temples, to the dozens of modern temples built today. Early temples, and some modern temples, have a priesthood assembly room with two sets of pulpits at each end of the room, with chairs or benches that can be altered to face either way. Most, but not all temples have the recognizable statue of the Angel Moroni atop a spire. The Nauvoo Temple and the Salt Lake Temple are adorned with symbolic stonework, representing various aspects of the faith.

=== Modern and post-modern architectures ===
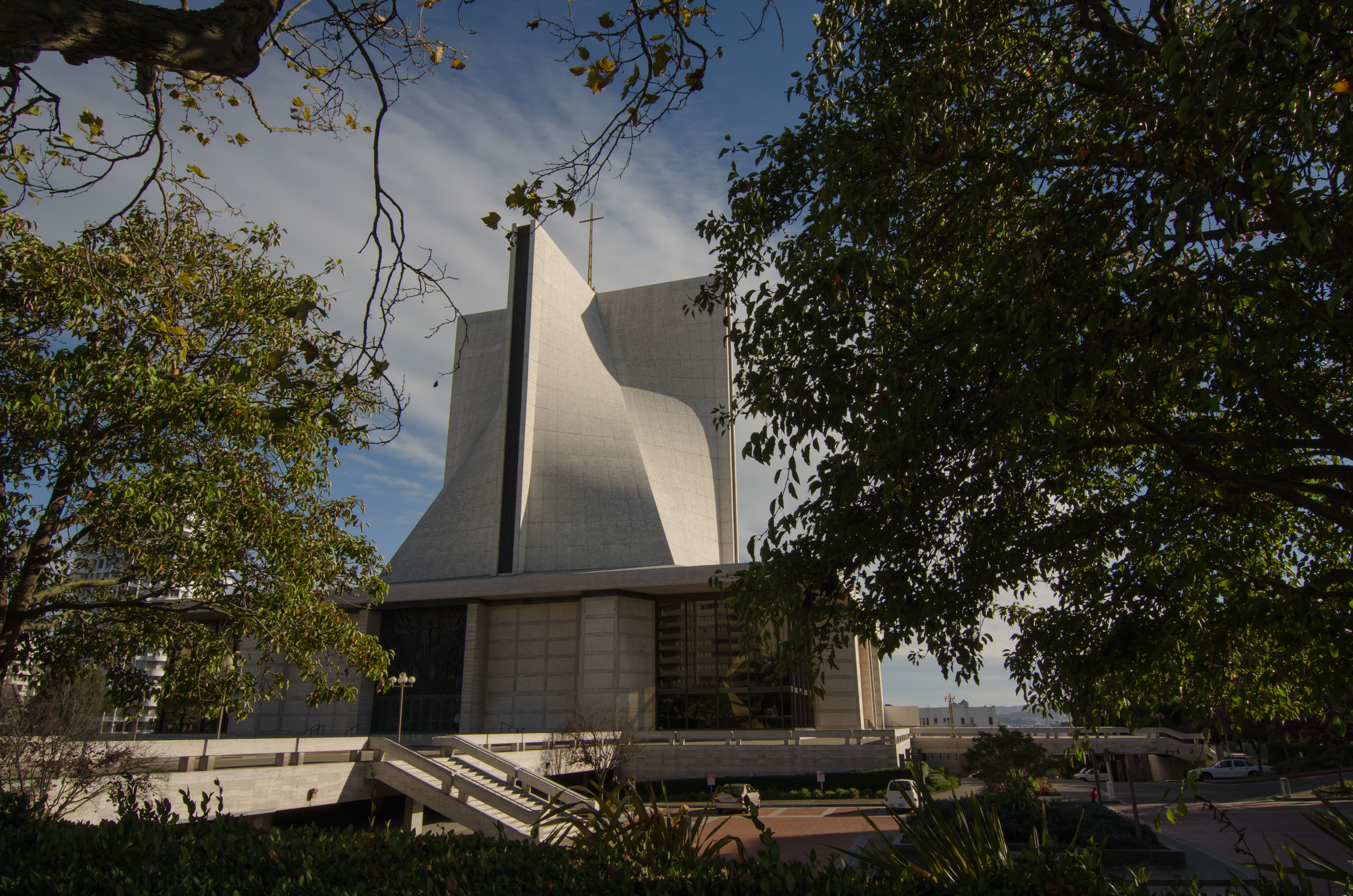
Cathedral of Saint Mary of the Assumption in San Francisco, United States

Modern architecture spans several styles with similar characteristics resulting in simplification of form and the elimination of ornament. The most influential modernist architects in the early to mid 20th century include Dominikus Böhm, Rudolf Schwarz, and Auguste Perret. While secular structures clearly had the greater influence on the development of modern architecture, several excellent examples of modern architecture can be found in religious buildings of the 20th century. For example, Unity Temple in Chicago is a Unitarian Universalist congregation designed by Frank Lloyd Wright. The United States Air Force Academy Cadet Chapel, started in 1954 and completed in 1962, was designed by Walter Netsch and is an excellent example of modern religious architecture. It has been described as a "phalanx of fighters" turned on their tails and pointing heavenward. In 1967, Architect Pietro Belluschi designed the strikingly modern Cathedral of St. Mary of the Assumption (San Francisco), the first Catholic cathedral in the United States intended to conform to Vatican II.

Postmodern architecture may be described by unapologetically diverse aesthetics where styles collide, form exists for its own sake, and new ways of viewing familiar styles and space abound. The Temple at Independence, Missouri was conceived by Japanese architect Gyo Obata after the concept of the chambered nautilus. The Catholic Cathedral of Our Lady of the Angels (Los Angeles) was designed in 1998 by Rafael Moneo in a post-modern style. The structure evokes the area's Hispanic heritage through the use of adobe coloring while combining stark modern form with some traditional elements. The Basilica of Our Lady of Licheń on the other hand is a much more traditional edifice. Designed by Barbara Bielecka and built between 1994 and 2004, its form includes references to a number of Polish structures. The columns possess a slenderness and delicacy inspired by those of the Renaissance court of Wawel Castle in Kraków, while the huge 420-foot spire that will be erected next to the basilica bears more than an accidental resemblance to the Baroque spire that adorns the Jasna Góra Monastery of Częstochowa, home of the Black Madonna.

=== Shaker communities ===
Shaker communities were semiotically architectured upon the crux of the compass rose.

== Islam ==
=== Early Islamic architecture ===
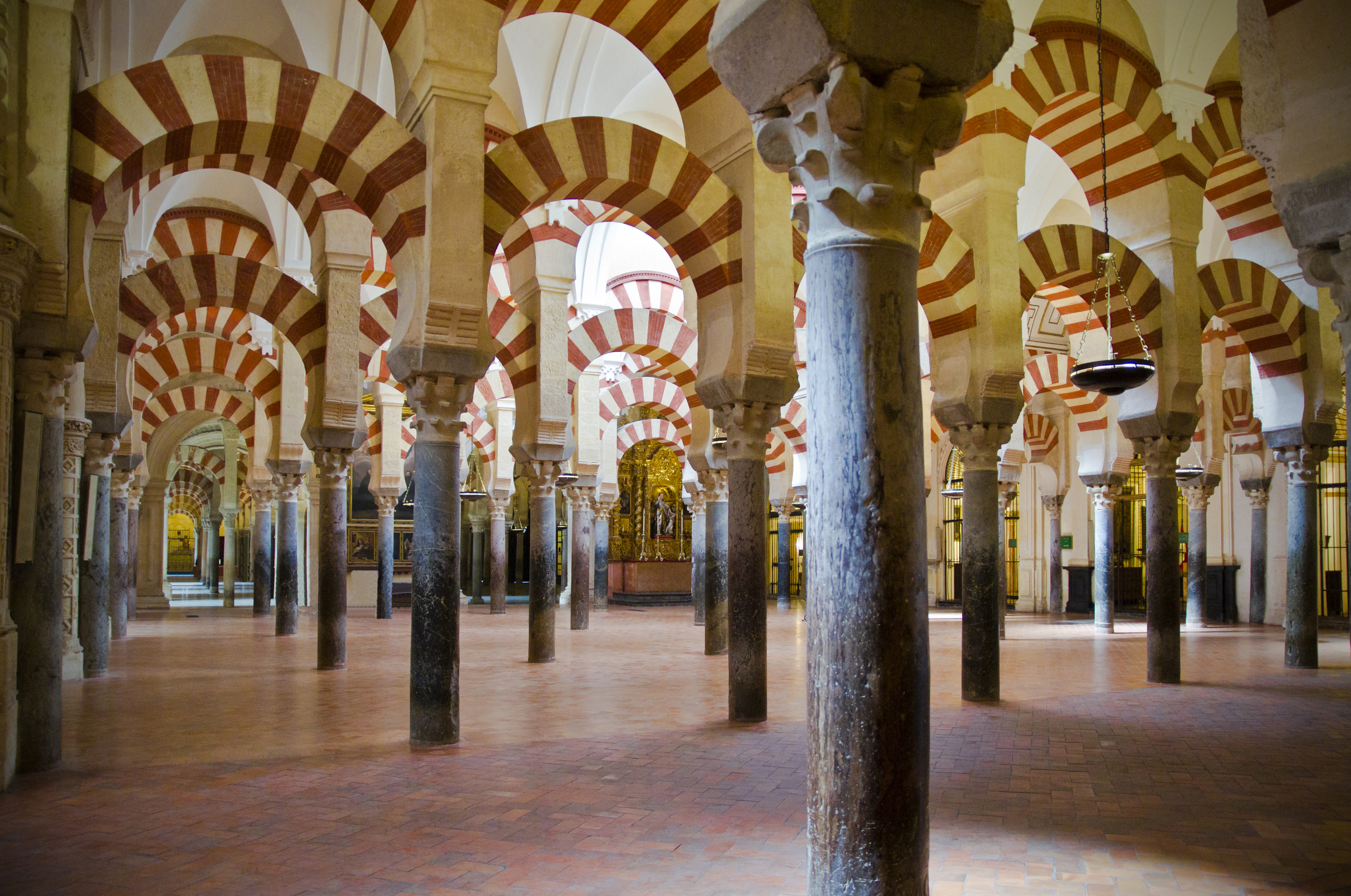
Interior of the Mezquita, a hypostyle mosque-cathedral with columns arranged in grid pattern, in Córdoba, Spain

Byzantine architecture had a great influence on early Islamic architecture with its characteristic horseshoe arches, vaults and domes. Many forms of mosques have evolved in different regions of the Islamic world. Notable mosque types include the early Abbasid mosques, T-type mosques, and the central-dome mosques of Anatolia. The earliest styles in Islamic architecture produced 'Arab-plan' or hypostyle mosques during the Umayyad Dynasty. These mosques follow a square or rectangular plan with enclosed courtyard and covered prayer hall. Most early hypostyle mosques had flat prayer hall roofs, which required numerous columns and supports. The Mezquita in Córdoba, Spain was constructed as a hypostyle mosque supported by over 850 columns. Arab-plan mosques continued under the Abbasid dynasty.

=== Ottoman architecture ===
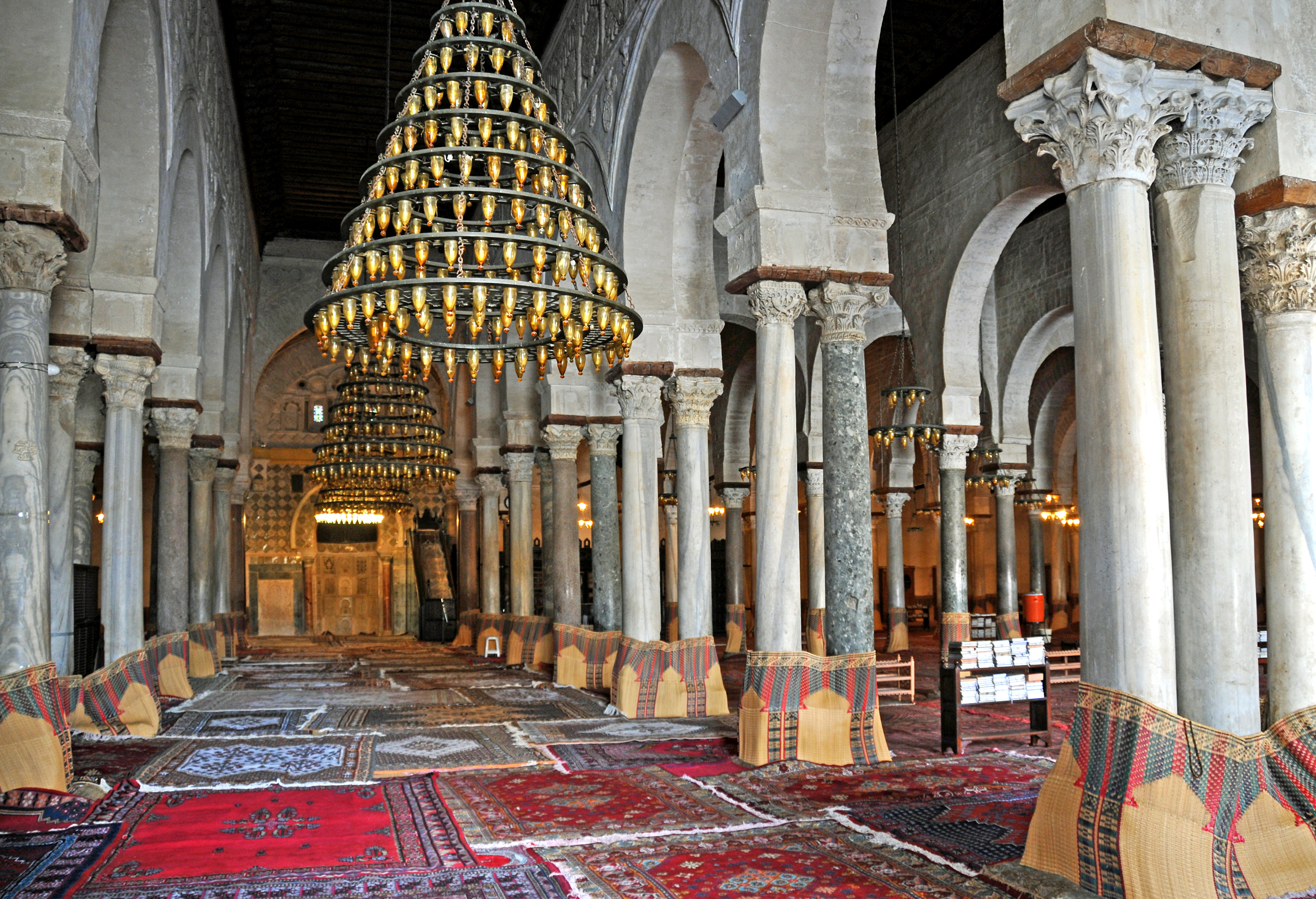
The Great Mosque of Kairouan built in 670 shows considerable Byzantine influence

The Ottomans introduced 'central dome' mosques in the 15th century that have a large dome centered over the prayer hall. In addition to having one large dome at the center, there are often smaller domes that exist off-center over the prayer hall or throughout the rest of the mosque, in areas where prayer is not performed. The Dome of the Rock mosque in Jerusalem is perhaps the best known example of a central dome mosque.

=== Iranian sacral architecture ===
'Iwan mosques' are most notable for their domed chambers and iwans, which are vaulted spaces open out on one end. In iwan mosques, one or more iwans face a central courtyard that serves as the prayer hall. The style represents a borrowing from pre-Islamic Iranian architecture and has been used almost exclusively for mosques in Iran. Many iwan mosques are converted Zoroastrian fire temples where the courtyard was used to house the sacred fire. Today, iwan mosques are no longer built. The Shah Mosque in Isfahan, Iran is a classic example of an iwan mosque.

=== Characteristic features and styles ===
A common feature in mosques is the minaret, the tall, slender tower that usually is situated at one of the corners of the mosque structure. The top of the minaret is always the highest point in mosques that have one, and often the highest point in the immediate area. The first mosques had no minarets, and even nowadays the most conservative Islamic movements, like Wahhabis, avoid building minarets, seeing them as ostentatious and unnecessary. The first minaret was constructed in 665 in Basra during the reign of the Umayyad caliph Muawiyah I. Muawiyah encouraged the construction of minarets, as they were supposed to bring mosques on par with Christian churches with their bell towers. Consequently, mosque architects borrowed the shape of the bell tower for their minarets, which were used for essentially the same purpose – calling the faithful to prayer.

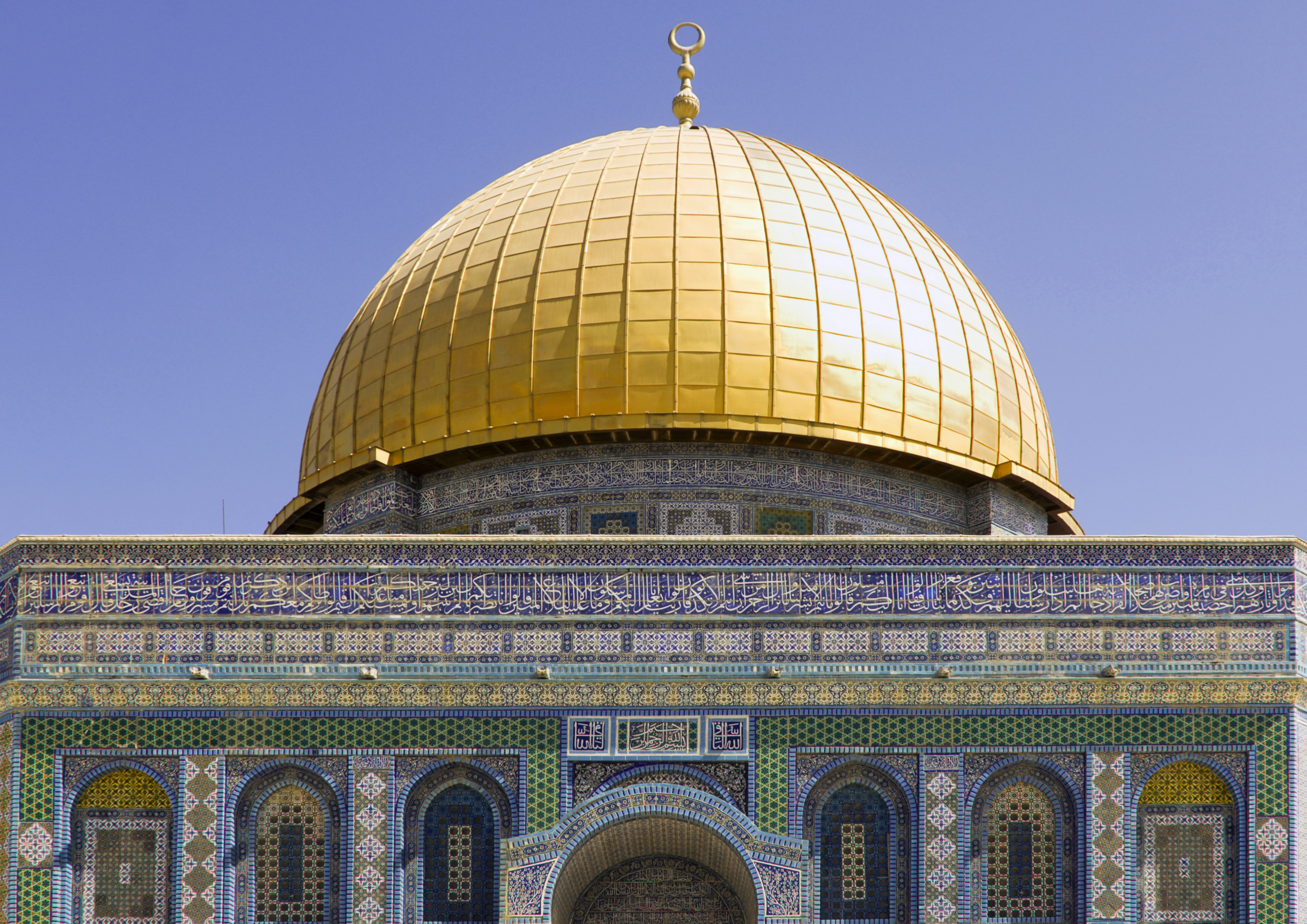
The Dome of the Rock in Jerusalem is a notable Islamic dome

Domes have been a hallmark of Islamic architecture since the 7th century. As time progressed, the sizes of mosque domes grew, from occupying only a small part of the roof near the mihrab to encompassing all of the roof above the prayer hall. Although domes normally took on the shape of a hemisphere, the Mughals in India popularized onion-shaped domes in South Asia and Persia.

The prayer hall, also known as the musalla, has no furniture; chairs and pews are absent from the prayer hall. Prayer halls contain no images of people, animals, and spiritual figures although they may be decorated with Arabic calligraphy and verses from the Qur'an on the walls.

Usually opposite the entrance to the prayer hall is the qibla wall, which is the visually emphasized area inside the prayer hall. The qibla wall is normally set perpendicular to a line leading to Mecca. Worshipers pray in rows parallel to the qibla wall and thus arrange themselves so they face Mecca. In the qibla wall, usually at its center, is the mihrab, a niche or depression indicating the qibla wall. Usually the mihrab is not occupied by furniture either. Sometimes, especially during Friday prayers, a raised minbar or pulpit is located to the side of the mihrab for a khatib or some other speaker to offer a sermon (khutbah). The mihrab serves as the location where the imam leads the five daily prayers on a regular basis.

Mosques often have ablution fountains or other facilities for washing in their entryways or courtyards. However, worshipers at much smaller mosques often have to use restrooms to perform their ablutions. In traditional mosques, this function is often elaborated into a freestanding building in the center of a courtyard. Modern mosques may have a variety of amenities available to their congregants and the community, such as health clinics, libraries and gymnasiums.

== Bahá'í Houses of Worship ==
Bahá'í Houses of Worship or Mas͟hriqu'l-Ad͟hkár (Arabic: مشرق اﻻذكار "Dawning-place of the remembrance of God") exemplify the principles of the Bahá'í Faith of unity in diversity, the unity of God, the unity of His prophets and religions, and the unity of humanity. These spiritual principles give rise to new forms of architectural expression that serve as spaces in which people of all beliefs, cultures, and backgrounds gather together, meditate, reflect, and pray, and around which will be built social, humanitarian, educational, and scientific institutions. The design of each Bahá'í House of Worship reflects unifying elements of their environment, emerging from a grassroots approach of consultation with the native people, each having nine sides and nine entrances, the number nine being symbolic of unity. Eight continental and two local Bahá'í Houses of Worship have been built so far.

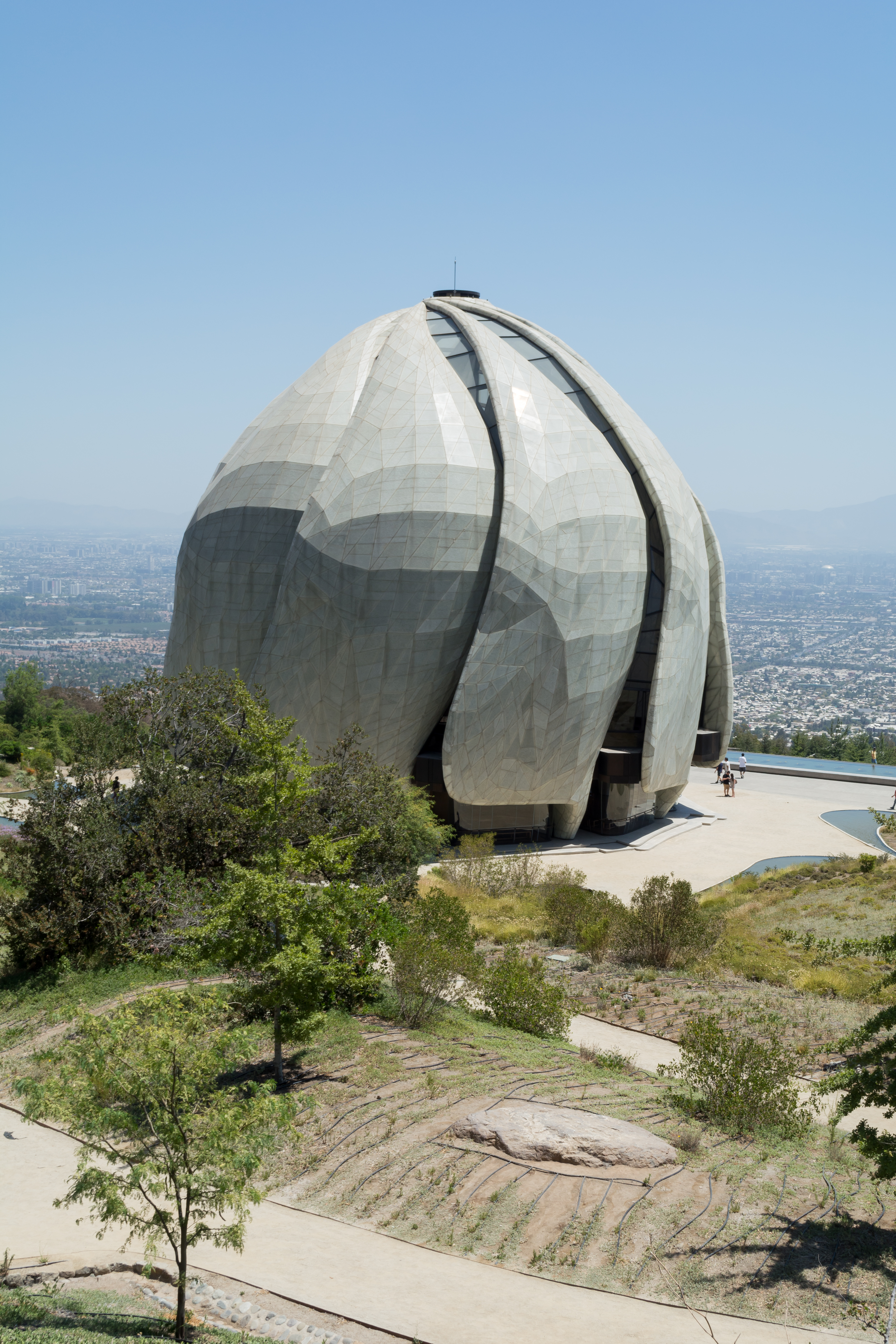
Baháʼí House of Worship, Santiago, Chile

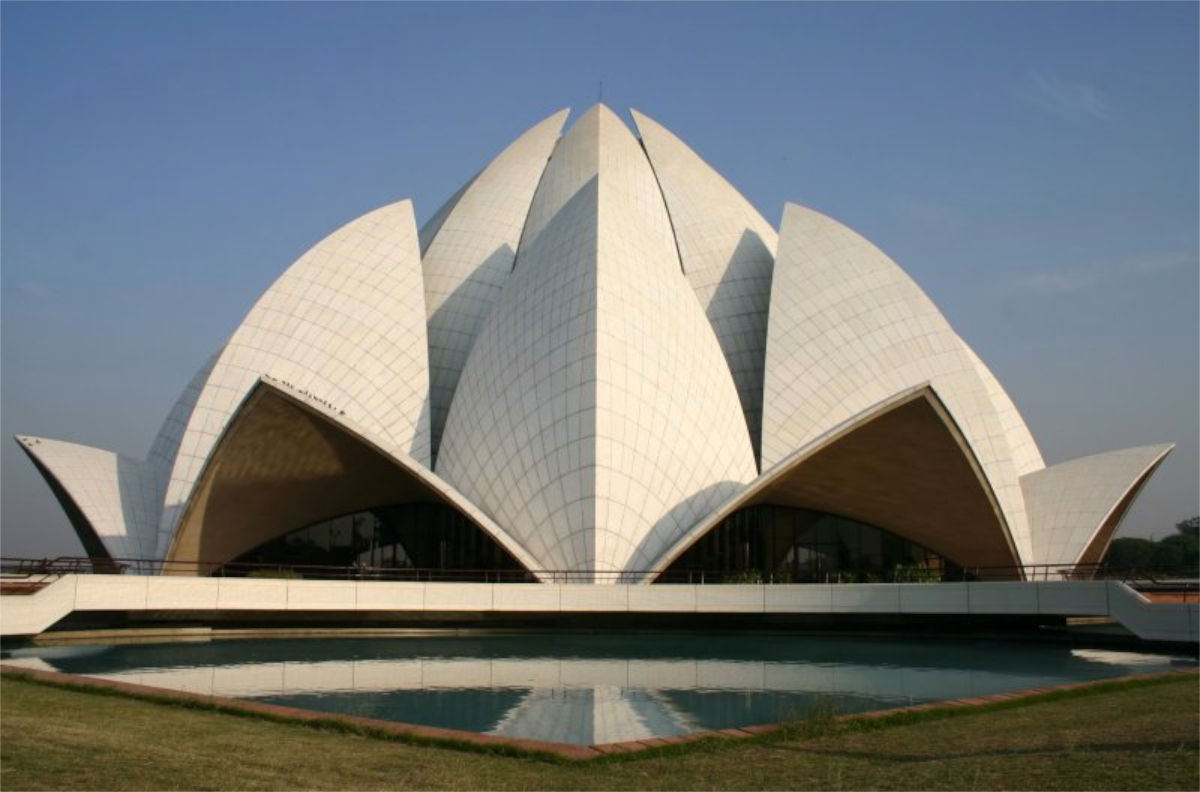
The Baháʼí Lotus Temple in Delhi, India

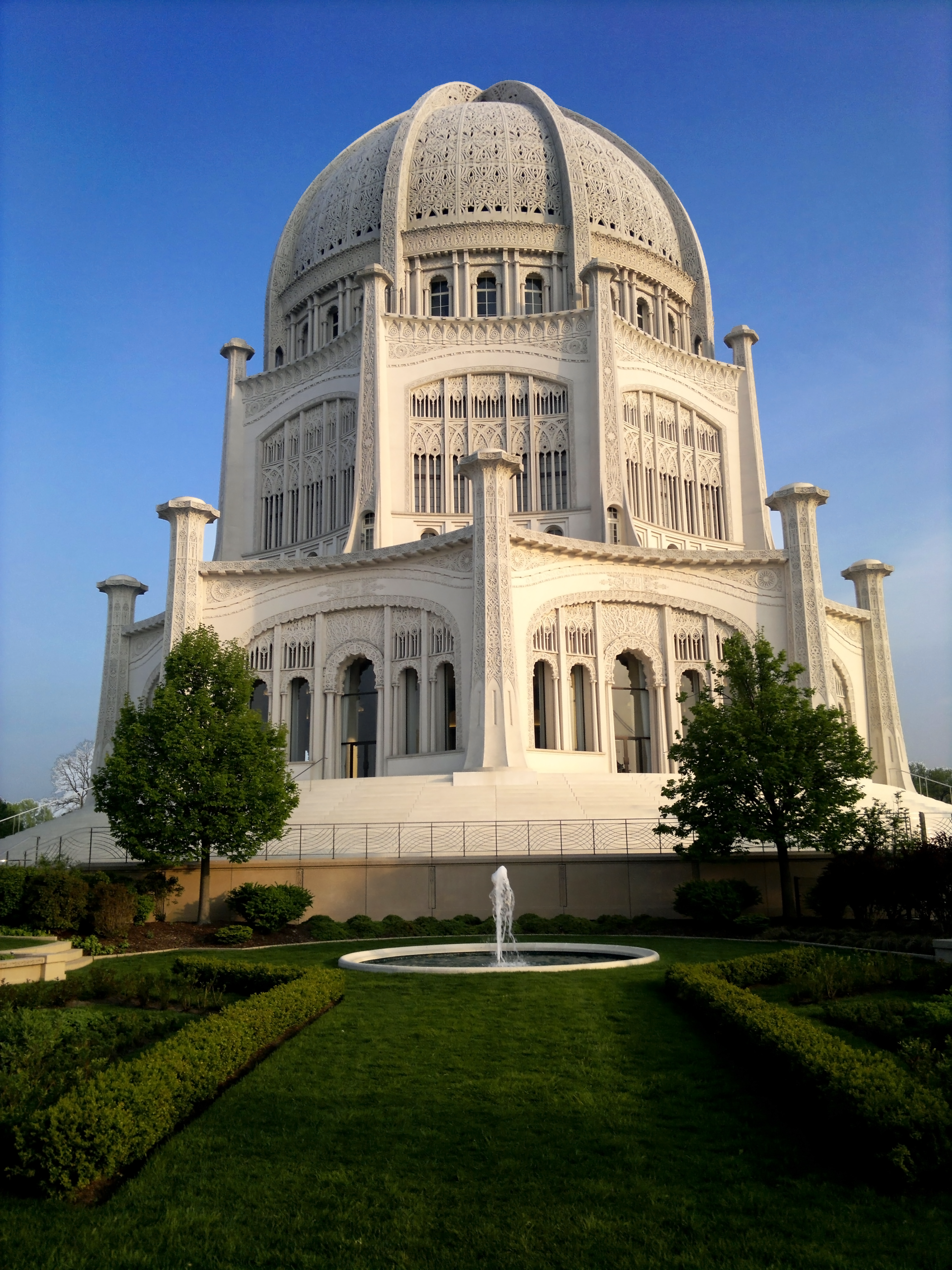
Bahá'í House of Worship, Wilmette, Illinois

== See also ==
- Chapel
- Ġgantija
- Mandir
- Hierotopy
- Sanctum sanctorum
- Sacred site

=== References ===
- Jeanne Halgren Kilde, When Church Became Theatre: The Transformation of Evangelical Church Architecture and Worship in Nineteenth-Century America. (Oxford University Press:2002). ISBN
- Michael E. DeSanctis, Building from Belief: Advance, Retreat, and Compromise in the Remaking of Catholic Church Architecture.. (Liturgical Press:2002). ISBN
- Richard Kieckhefer, Theology in Stone: Church Architecture from Byzantium to Berkeley. (Oxford University Press, USA: 2004). ISBN
- Anne C. Loveland and Otis B. Wheeler, From Meetinghouse to Megachurch: A Material and Cultural History. (University of Missouri Press:2003). ISBN
- Michael S. Rose, Ugly as Sin: Why They Changed Our Churches from Sacred Places to Meeting Spaces -- and How We Can Change Them Back Again. (Sophia Institute Press: 2001). ISBN
- Steven J. Schloeder, Architecture in Communion: Implementing the Second Vatican Council through Liturgy and Architecture. (Ignatius Press: 1998). ISBN 0-89870-631-9.
- R. Kevin Seasoltz, A Sense Of The Sacred: Theological Foundations Of Christian Architecture And Art. (Continuum International Publishing Group: 2005) ISBN
