= Our Lady of Sorrows, Queen of Poland =

1772 Roman Catholic icon of the Blessed Virgin Mary

Our Lady of Sorrows of Lichen Queen and Patroness of Poland
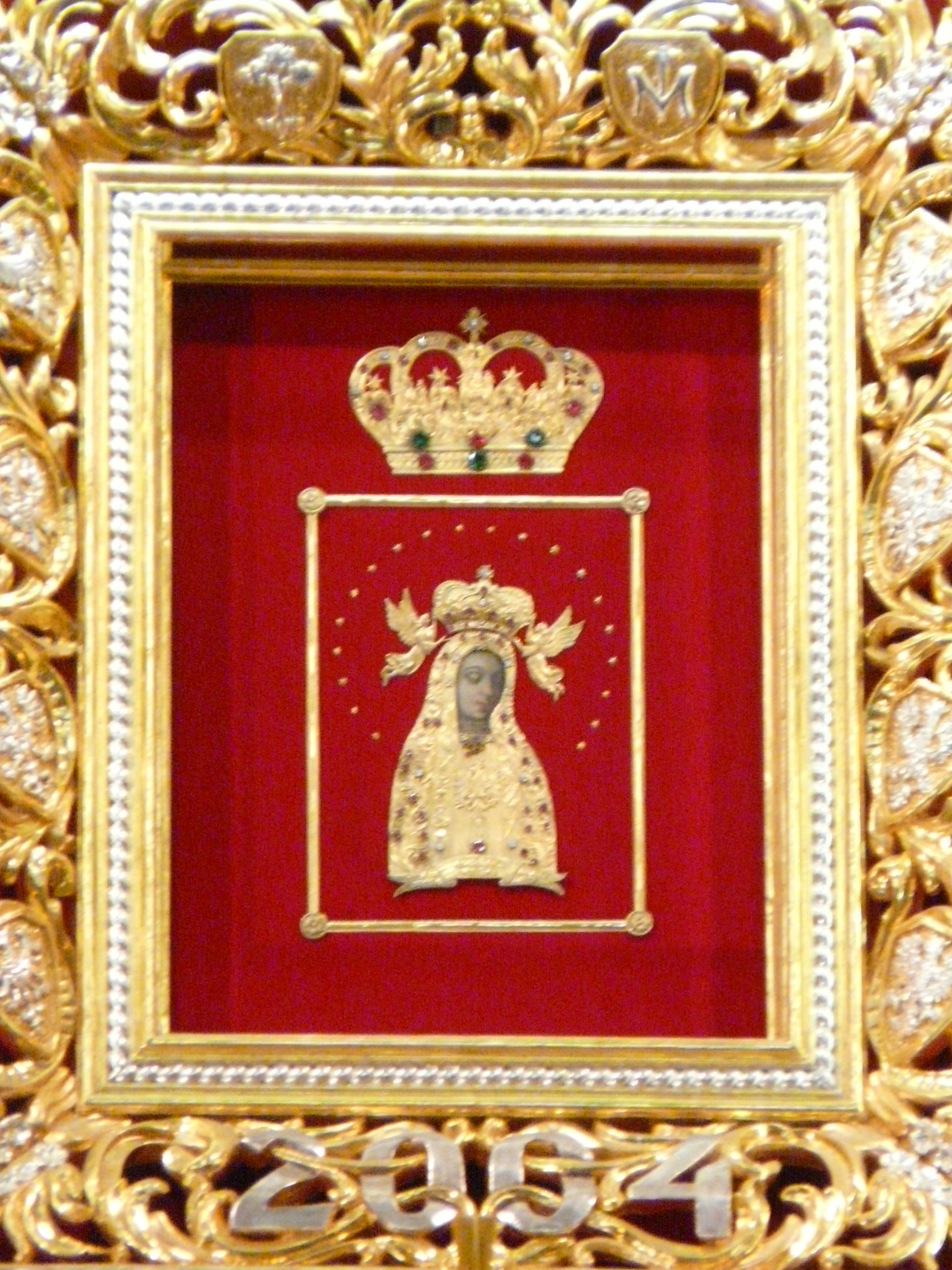
- Location: Licheń, Poland
- Date: 1772
- Type: Wooden icon, bejewelled
- Approval: Pope Paul VI; Pope John Paul II
- Shrine: Basilica of Our Lady of Sorrows of Lichen
- Patronage: Poland

Our Lady of Sorrows, Queen of Poland, locally known as the Virgin of Licheń is a Roman Catholic icon of the Blessed Virgin Mary venerated by its Polish faithful. It dates to 1772 and is permanently enshrined within the Sanctuary of Our Lady of Licheń, in central Poland, which was built to honor it, and receives about 1.5 million pilgrims per year.

Pope Paul VI issued a decree of Pontifical coronation for the image on 8 November 1965. The rite of coronation was executed by the former Archbishop of Warsaw, Cardinal Stefan Wyszyński on 15 August 1967. Pope John Paul II decreed her shrine as a Minor Basilica on 25 February 2005. The image was officially enshrined within the building on 2 July 2006.

Along with the Black Madonna of Częstochowa, the image is one of the two most venerated Marian images in Poland.

== Description ==
In the central image, the Virgin Mary has a gold panel dress created in 2017 for its 50th year thanksgiving anniversary of Pontifical coronation.

The Marian image is crowned by two angels and is surrounded by a ring of stars. Below the image, a ribbon carries the inscription: "Queen of Poland, give us days of peace." The image measures 9.5 × 15.5 cm and is on larger panel of 16 × 25 cm. The actual Pontifical crown of 1967 is above the original image, set on the larger frame panel created in 2004.

== History ==
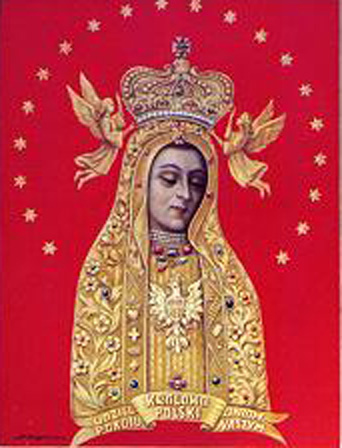
Zoom view of the image.

The icon was painted in 1772 as a replica of the icon of the Blessed Virgin Mary enshrined in Rokitno, Międzyrzecz County in Western Poland. According to legend, a Polish soldier, Thomas Kłossowski was wounded in the Battle of Leipzig in 1813 and had a vision of the Virgin Mary who saved him from death and instructed him to look for the image upon his return to Poland. Kłossowski is then said to have looked for and found the image in the woods in Grąblin as instructed.

According to oral tradition, in 1850 Kłossowski and shepherd Nicholas Sikatka witnessed several apparitions of the Virgin Mary who called for repentance and prayer. In the apparitions, the Virgin reportedly predicted war and a cholera epidemic but also gave hope. During the cholera plague of 1852, the image became famous for claims of purported miraculous healing.

On 29 September 1852, the image was moved to the parish church in Licheń and remained there until 2006. The Primate of Poland, Cardinal Stefan Wyszynski executed the rite of Canonical Coronation towards the image with the 1965 decree of Pope Paul VI on 15 August 1967.

== Minor Basilica (2005) ==
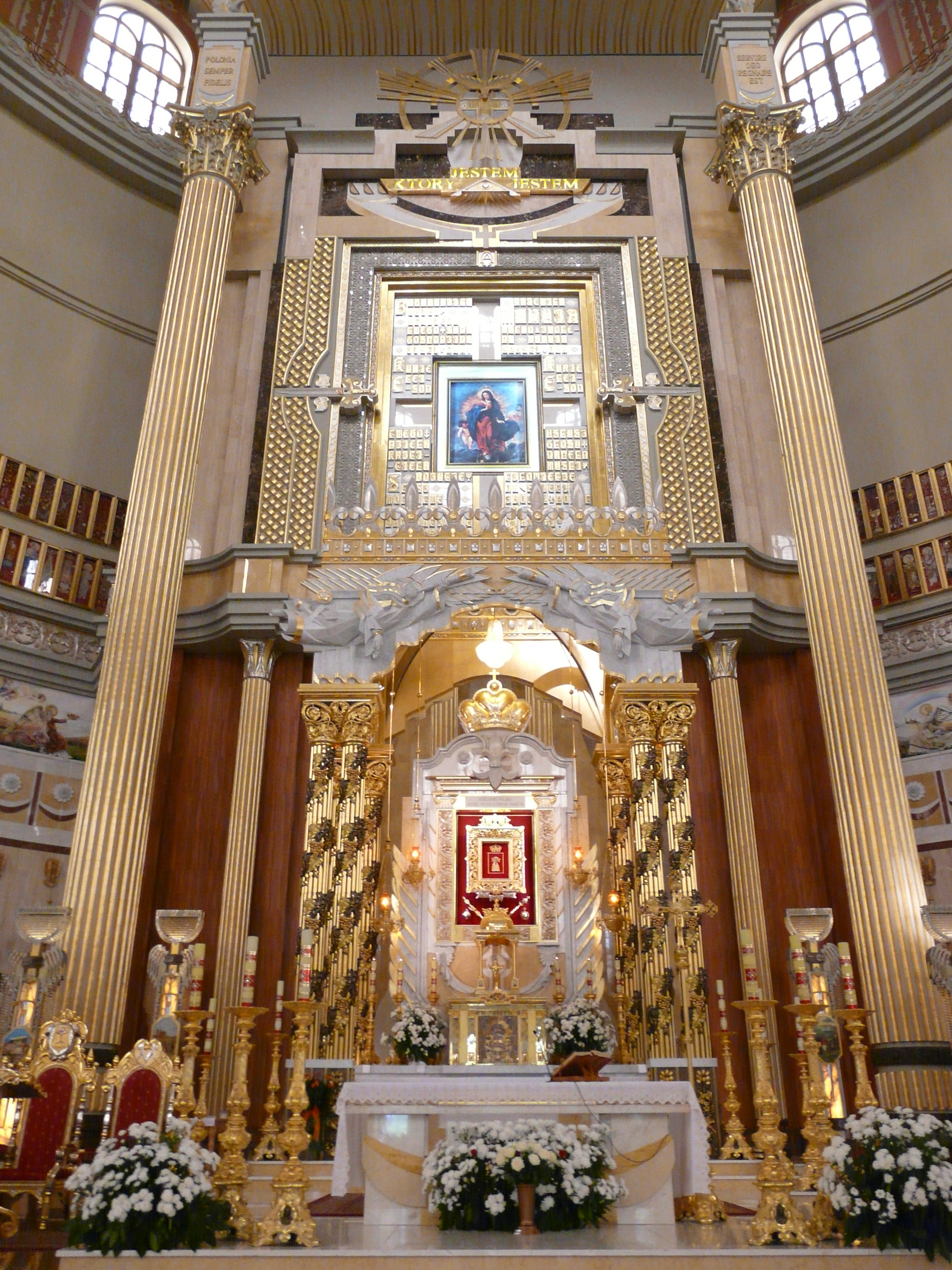
The framed icon (lower image in red) on the altar of the basilica.

In 1994, the construction of the new basilica of Sanctuary of Our Lady of Lichen was started to house the image and accommodate a large number of pilgrims. Pope John Paul II blessed the basilica in 1999, and decreed the title of minor basilica in 2005. The basilica is Poland's largest church, the seventh-largest in Europe and eleventh in the world.

The basilica's organ created by Professor Andrzej Chorosiński and manufactured by the Zych company (157 stops, 6 manuals and pedalboard) is the largest instrument in Poland, the fourth largest in Europe and thirteenth-largest in the world. In 2004, the marked golden protective altar frame was constructed for veneration. On 2 July 2006, the heavily guarded image was placed in the main altar of the basilica.

== See also ==
- Marian devotions
- Catholic Mariology
