= Licheń Stary =

- Village
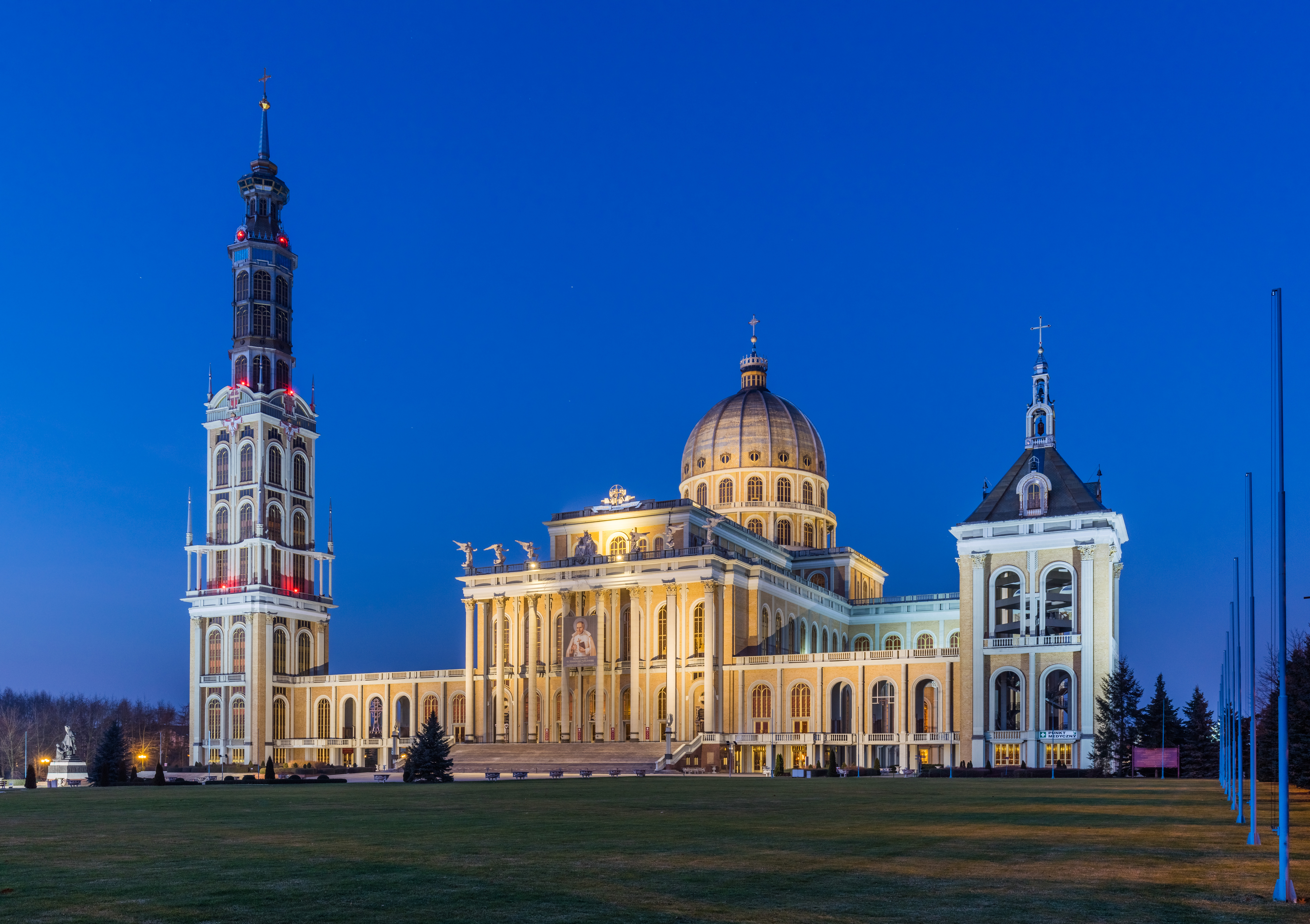
- Sanctuary of Our Lady of Licheń

- Location within Poland
- Coordinates: 52°19′24″N 18°21′36″E
- Country: Poland
- Voivodeship: Greater Poland
- County: Konin
- Gmina: Ślesin
- Population: 1,100

Licheń Stary [ˈlixɛɲ ˈstarɨ] is a village in the administrative district of Gmina Ślesin, within Konin County, Greater Poland Voivodeship, in central Poland.

The village's name means "old Licheń"; it is often referred to as simply Licheń.

Licheń Stary is the site of Poland's largest church, the Basilica of Our Lady of Licheń, completed in 2004, which houses the icon of the Virgin Mary called Our Lady of Sorrows, Queen of Poland. It was constructed to accommodate the large number of pilgrims (ca 1 million each year) who come to venerate the image of the Virgin Mary, which according to tradition has been miraculous.

Licheń Stary is also the site of Poland's largest organ (157 stops, 6 manuals and pedalboard, created by prof. Andrzej Chorosiński and manufactured by Polish organbuilder "Zych - Zakłady Organowe"); this instrument is also the fourth largest in Europe and thirteenth largest in the world. It is located in the Basilica of Our Lady of Licheń.

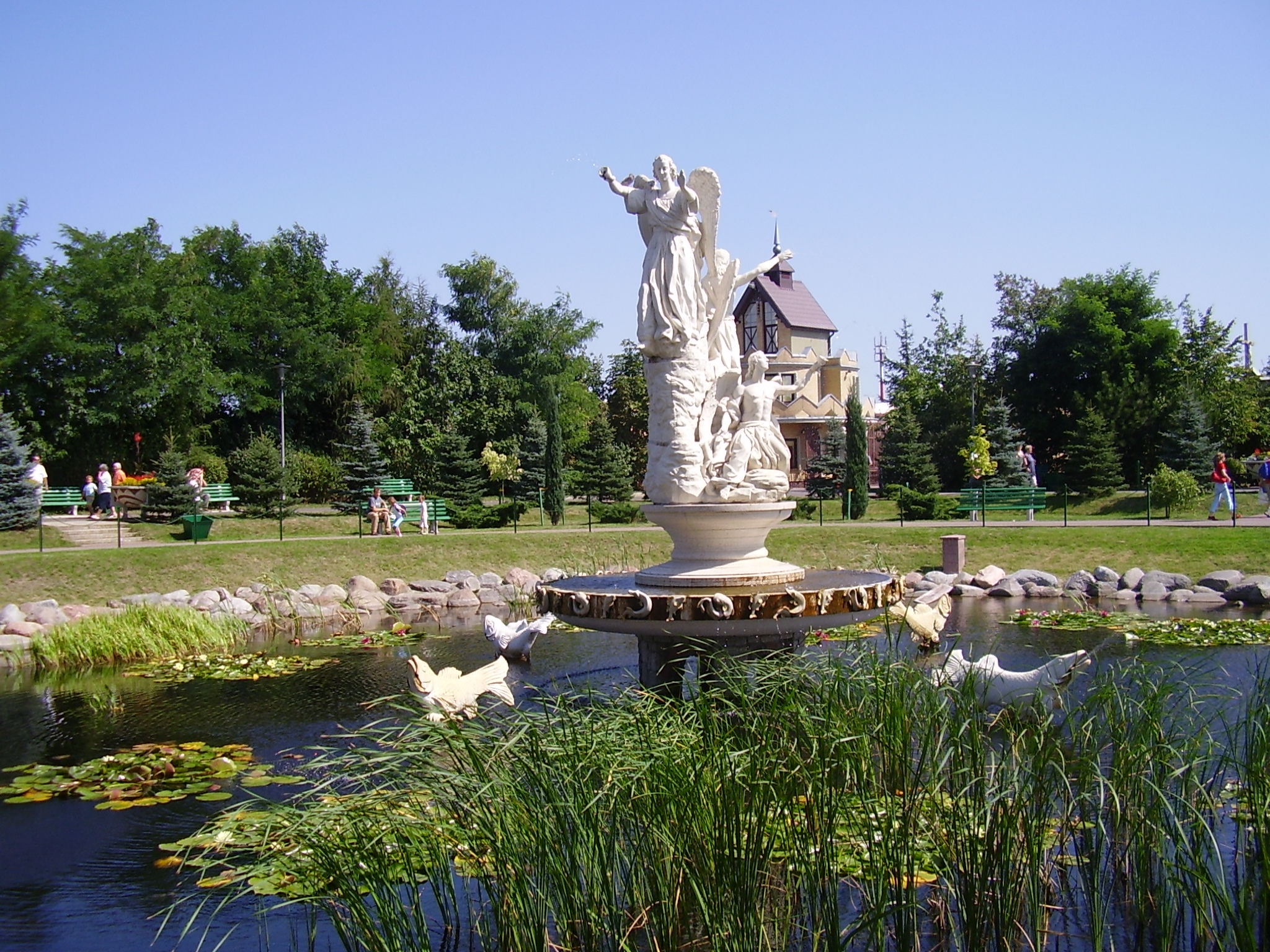
Fountain in Licheń Park popular with frequent visitors

== See also ==
- Basilica of Our Lady of Licheń
