= Barbara Bielecka =

Polish architect (1931–2019)

Barbara Bielecka (1 January 1931 – 23 September 2019) was a Polish Functionalist architect and a member of the Faculty of Architecture at the Gdańsk University of Technology. She designed the Sanctuary of Our Lady of Lichen, Poland's largest church, one of the largest churches by area in the world. It was constructed between 1994 and 2004. She served on the Commission of Urban Planning and Architecture at the Polish Academy of Sciences in Kraków.

== Life ==
Bielecka was born in 1931. She was on the faculty of the architecture department of the Gdańsk University of Technology. She had designed other churches before winning the architectural competition to design the Lichen sanctuary, and a pilgrim’s house in Lichen.

In May 1985, Bielecka joined the Commission of Urban Planning and Architecture at the Polish Academy of Sciences in Kraków. Bielecka died on 23 September 2019, at the age of 87.

== The Basilica of Our Lady of Licheń ==
Bielecka’s design is deliberately traditional, she said that "Retrospection is a characteristic of our times ... and the building cites classical forms freely and willingly”.

The Basilica building is faced with ochre marble, covers 23,000 cubic metres, has two levels, and consists of a main section, a belfry, and three grand porticoes. There is also a 141.5-metre-tall tower. The sanctuary was constructed between 1994 and 2004. The Basilica is Poland's largest church, and one of the largest churches by area in the world.

Bielecka designed the basilica to reflect the shapes and colours of the surrounding wheatfields, the pillars of the porticos reminiscent of Polish birch trees, and the windows shaped to resemble wheat ears. There are Polish symbols throughout the basilica, notably white eagles, the national symbol. The central dome is covered in gold-coloured aluminium tiles. Under the dome there is a mosaic map of Poland.
