= Basilica of Our Lady of Licheń =

Roman Catholic church in Licheń Stary, Poland

- Polish: Bazylika Najświętszej Maryi Panny Licheńskiej
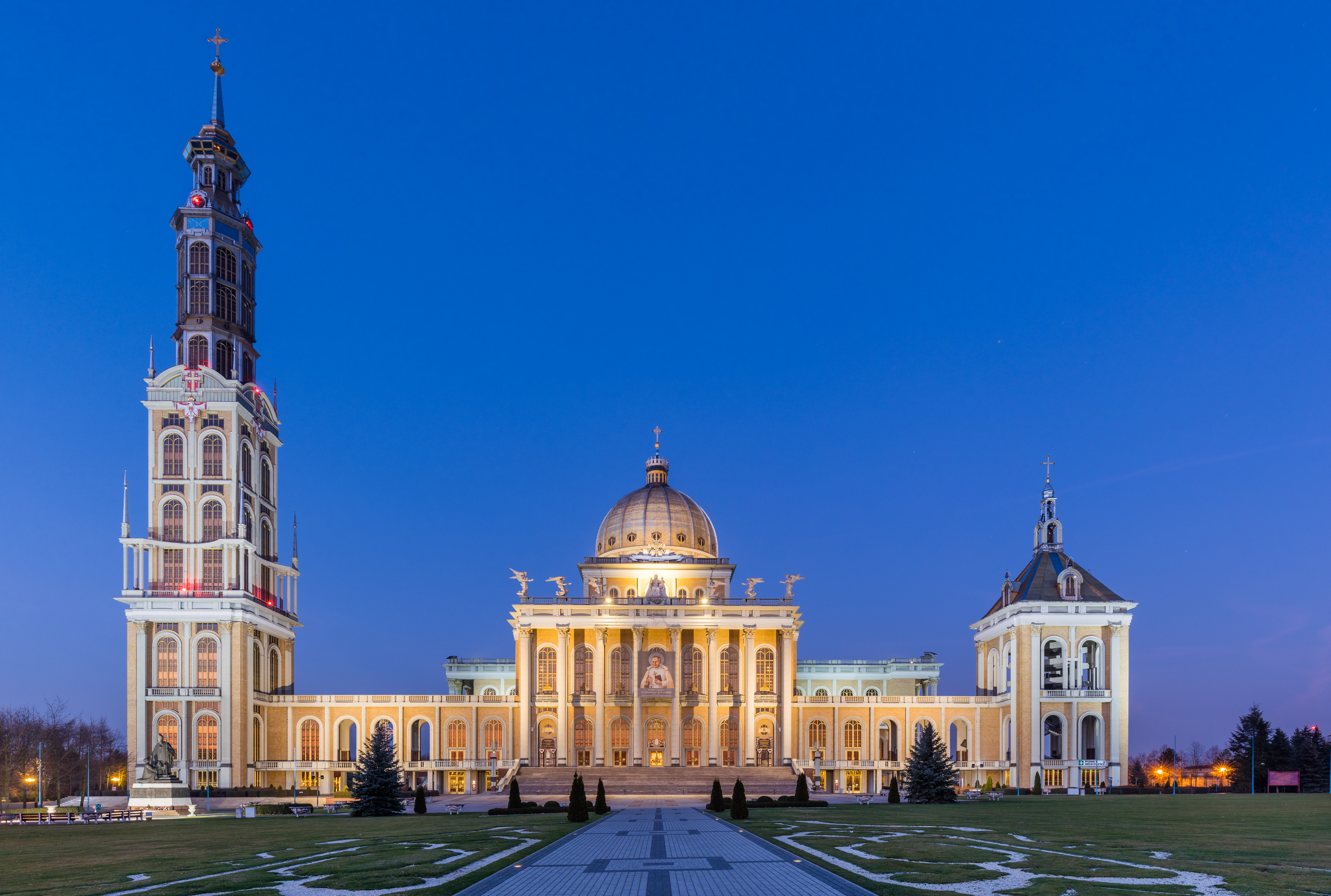
- Front view of the Basilica

- Location within Greater Poland Voivodeship Location within Poland

Religion
- Affiliation: Catholic Church
- Diocese: Diocese of Włocławek
- Year consecrated: 2004

Location
- Location: Licheń Stary, Poland
- Coordinates: 52°19′24.00″N 18°21′28.80″E

Architecture
- Architect: Barbara Bielecka
- Type: church
- Style: postmodern
- Groundbreaking: 24 June 1994
- Completed: 2004

Specifications
- Direction of façade: south
- Spire height: 141.5 m (464 ft)
- Materials: concrete, steel, bricks

The Basilica of Our Lady of Licheń [ˈlixɛɲ] (Polish: Bazylika Najświętszej Maryi Panny Licheńskiej) is a Catholic church at the Shrine of Our Lady of Sorrows, Queen of Poland, in the village of Licheń Stary near Konin in the Greater Poland Voivodeship in Poland. It is the largest church in Poland and one of the largest church buildings in the world.

The building was designed by Barbara Bielecka and built between 1994 and 2004. The construction was funded by pilgrims' donations. With a tower measuring 141.5 meters in height, it is one of the tallest and largest churches in the world.

Pope John Paul II raised the shrine to the status of minor basilica on 25 February 2005.

== History ==
The history of the foundation of the church dates back to 1813, when Tomasz Kłossowski, a Polish soldier fighting under Napoleon near Leipzig, was seriously wounded. He invoked the Virgin Mary, begging her not to let him die in a foreign land. According to legend, she appeared to him wearing a golden crown, a dark red gown, with a golden mantle, and holding a white eagle in her right hand. She comforted the soldier and promised he would recover and return to Poland. Tomasz was instructed to have an image of her made, and to place the image in a public place so that "My people will pray before this image and shall draw many graces at My hands in the hardest times of trial."

With the nave 120 meters long and 77 meters wide, with a central dome 98 meters (321 feet) high, and with a tower 141.5 metres (464 feet) tall, it is the largest church in Poland and one of the largest church buildings in the world. Also, it has one of the tallest domes in the world. The church is dedicated to Our Lady of Sorrows, Queen of Poland, whose icon, perhaps dating back to the 18th century, is displayed on the basilica's main altar. It is one of Poland's principal pilgrimage sites.

Between 2002 and 2007, Polish organbuilder Zych - on the base of the project made by Prof. Andrzej Chorosiński - built a 157-stop pipe organ (6 manuals and pedalboard). It is the largest organ in Poland, 4th in Europe and 13th around the world.

Pope John Paul II blessed the Basilica in 1999. In 2007, parts of the Polish museum in Fawley Court were translocated to the shrine by the Marian Fathers.

== Gallery ==
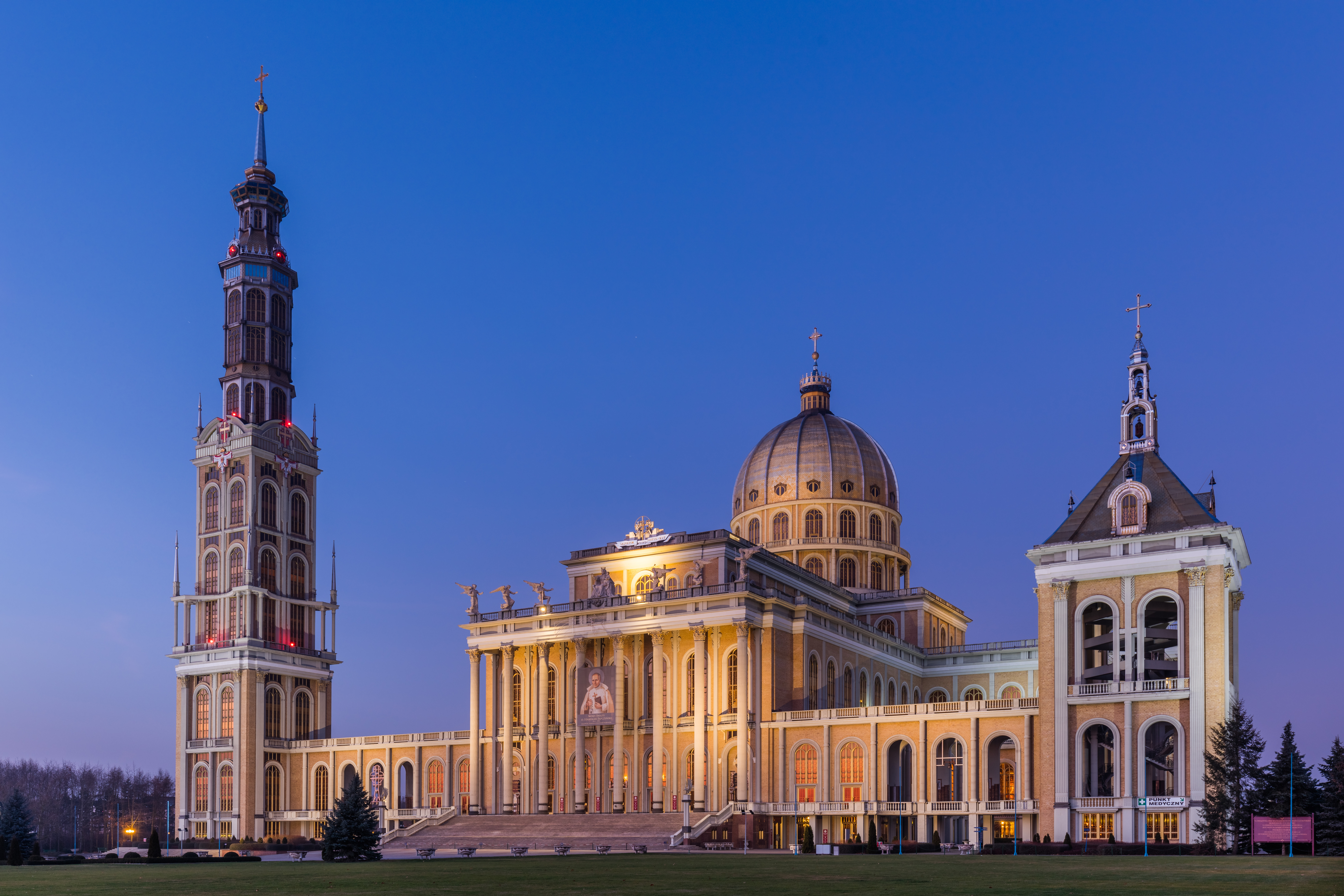
General view

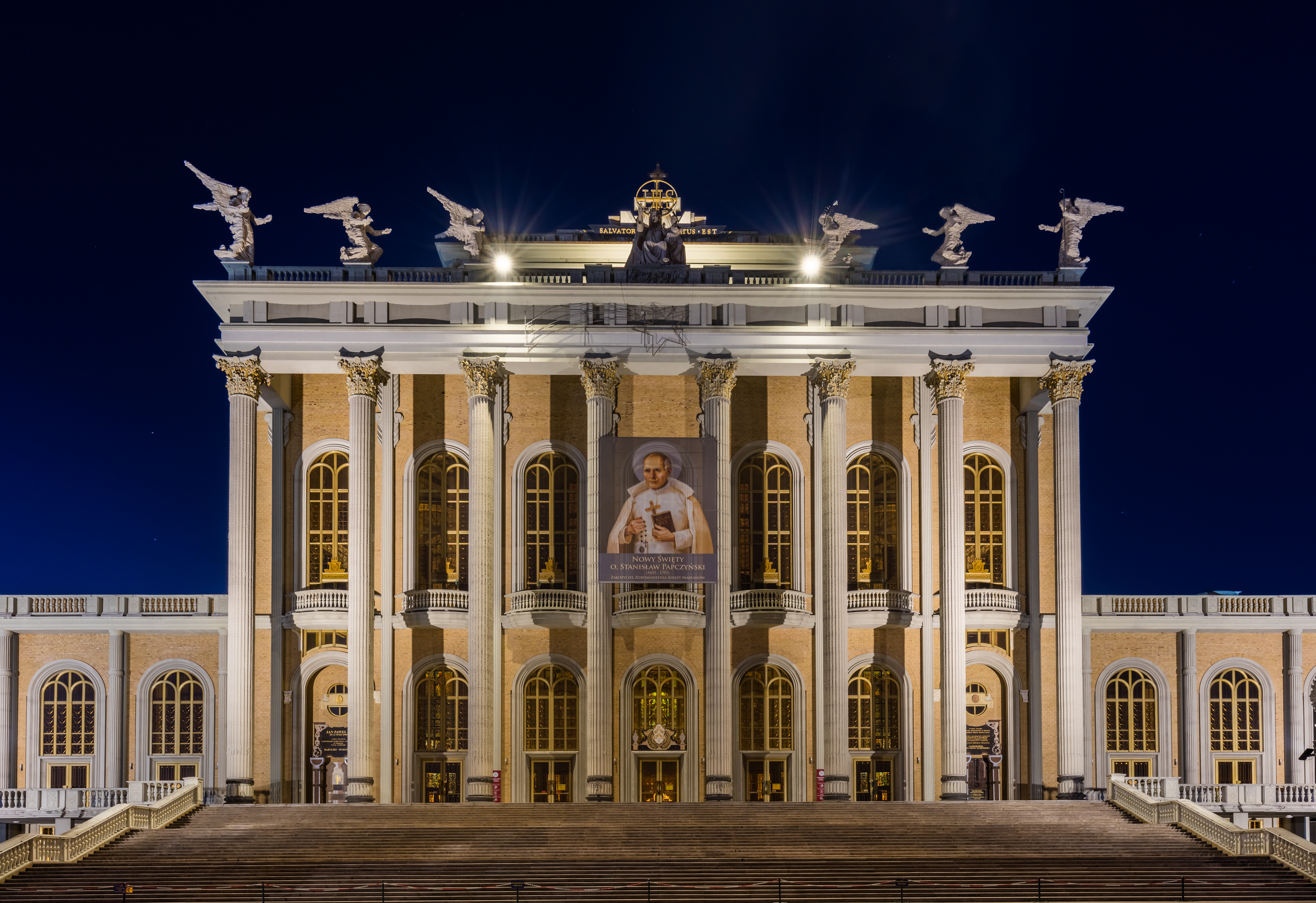
South facade of the main building

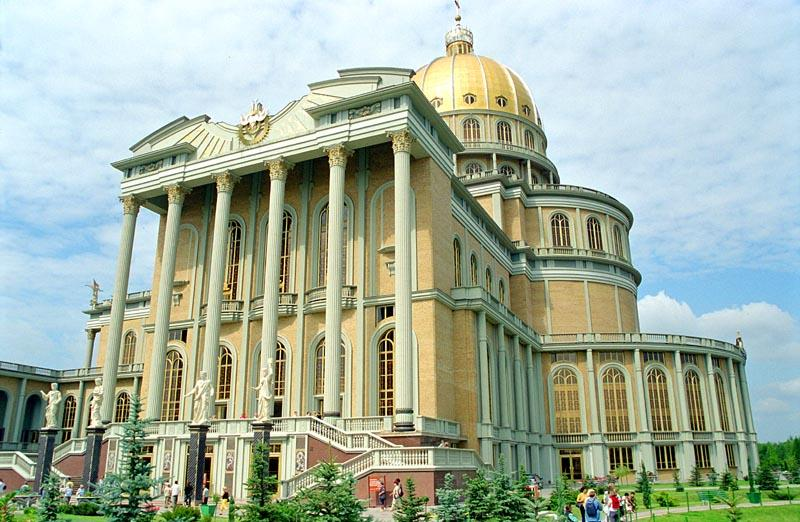
Eastern side view of the Basilica, overlooking the piazza

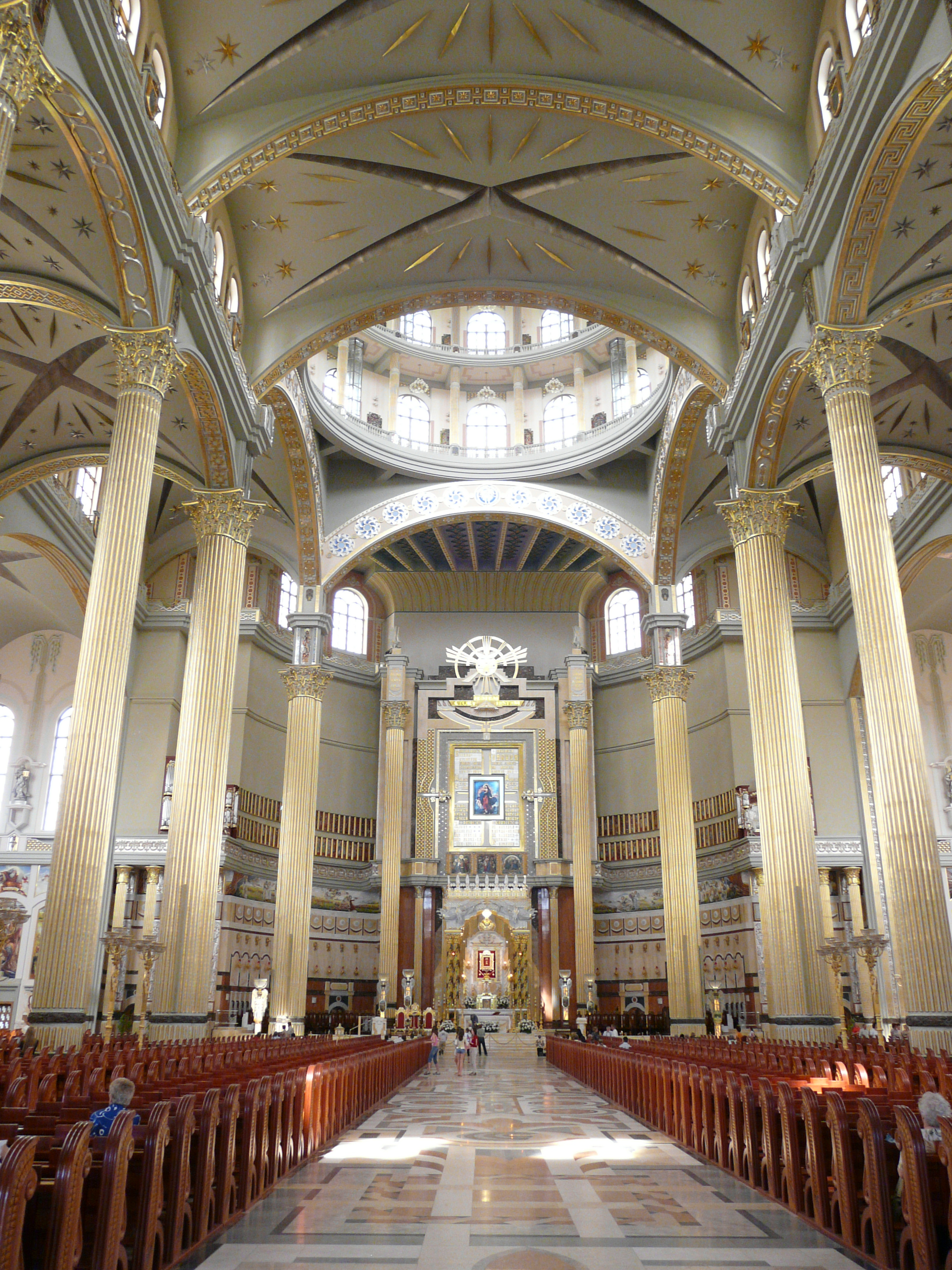
A view of the main altar with the holy icon of Our Lady of Licheń

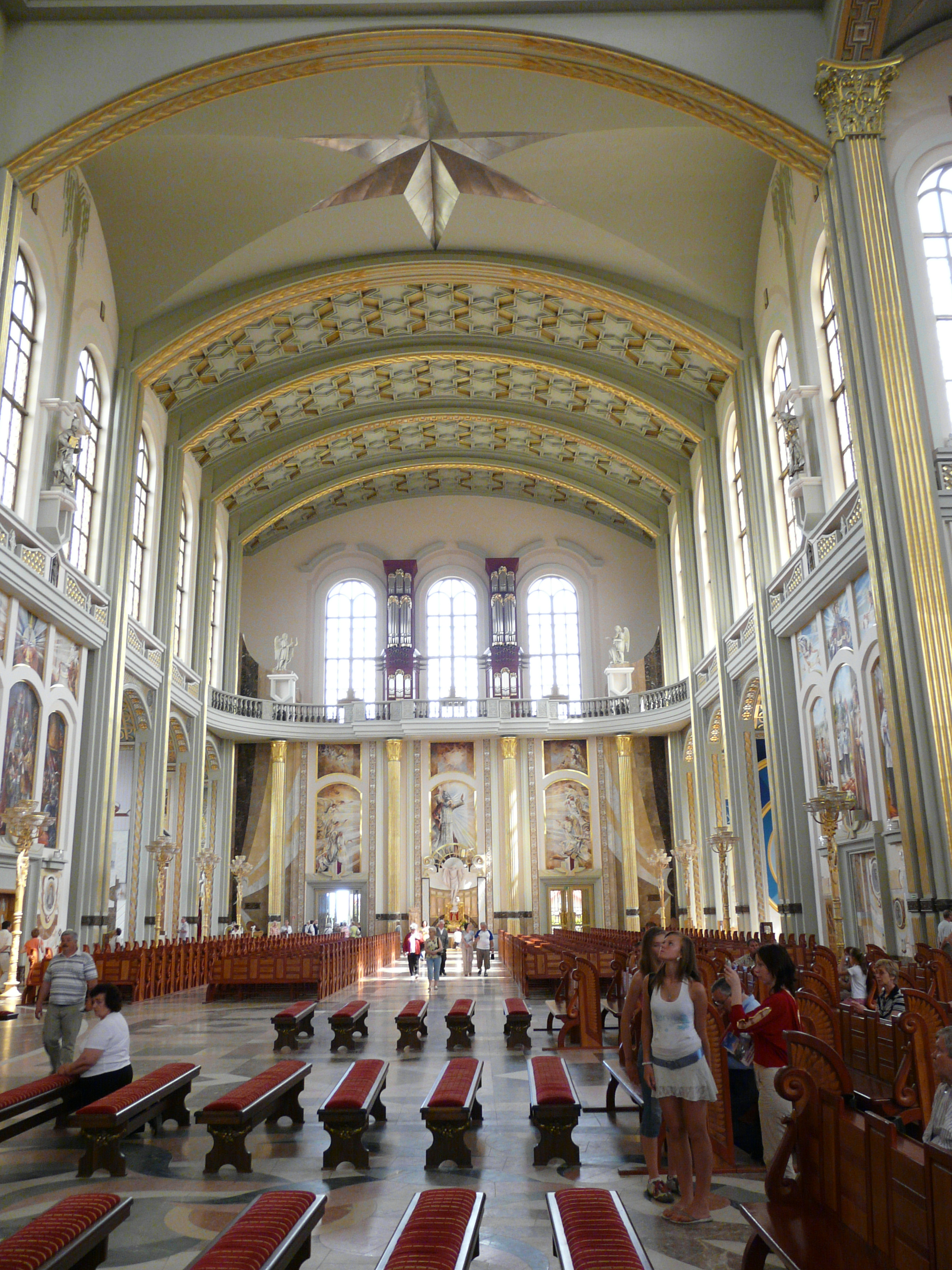
An interior view of the Basilica's eastern side wing

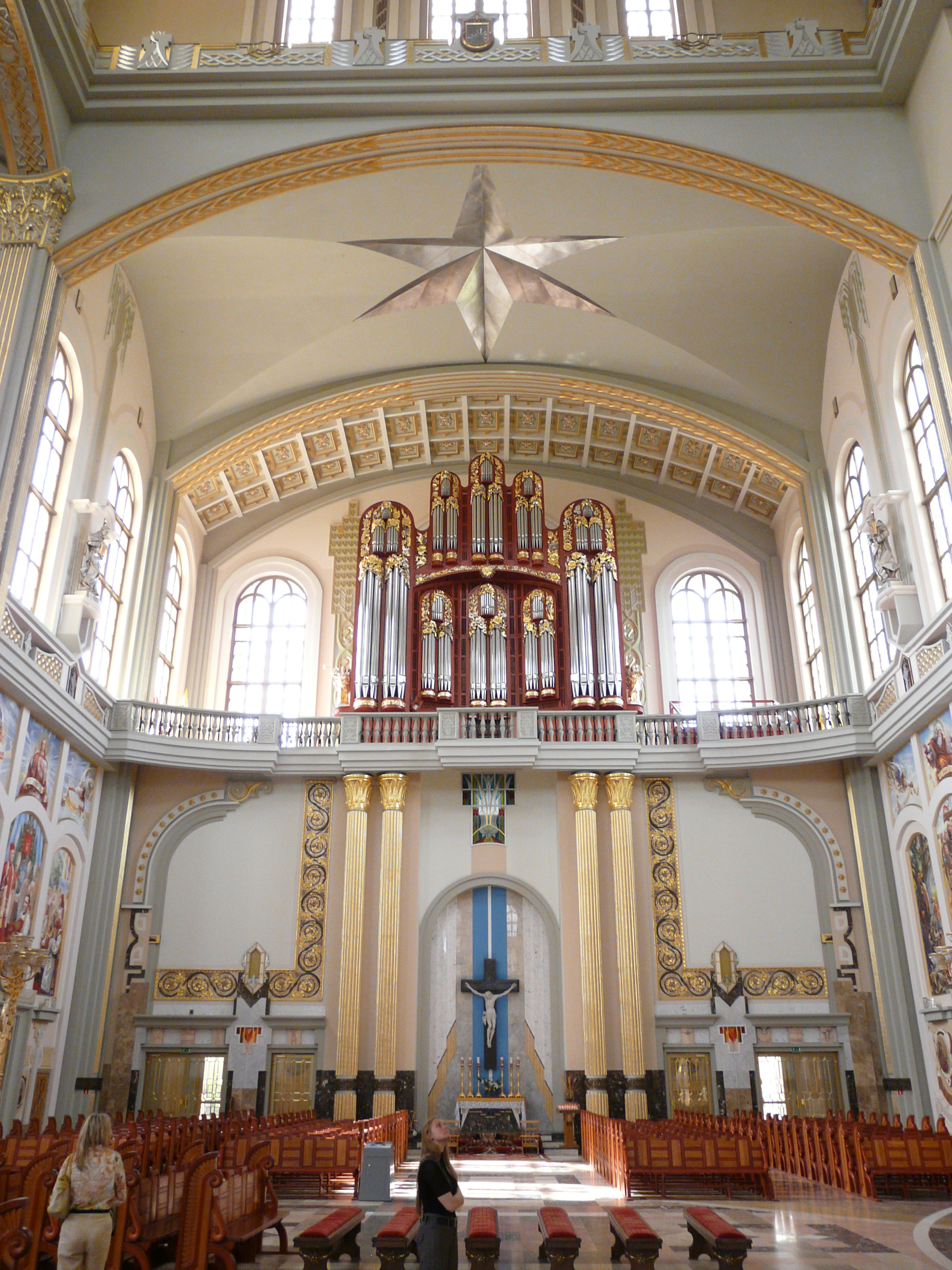
Altar with a large crucifix in the western side wing

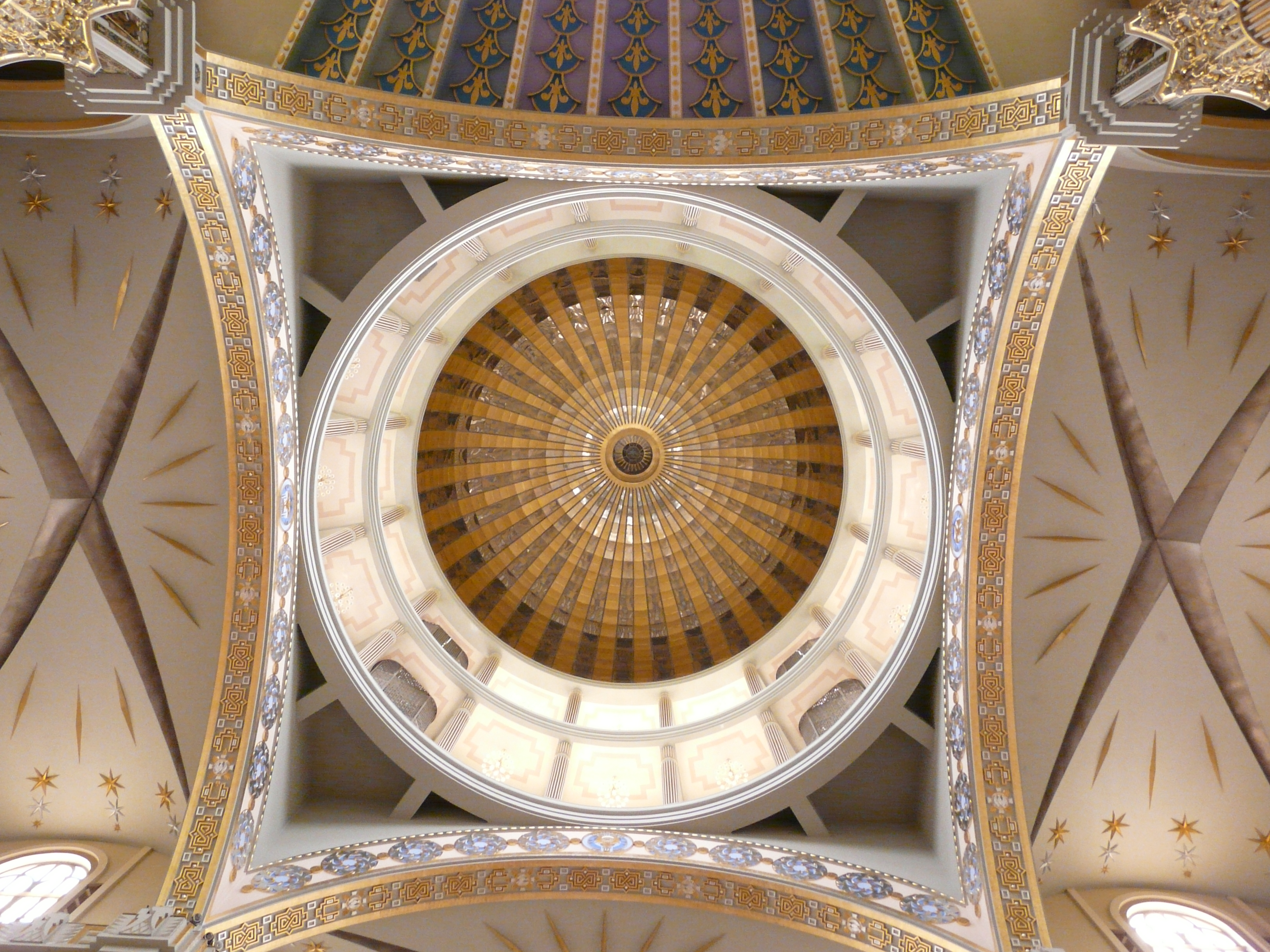
The cupola seen from the interior of the Basilica

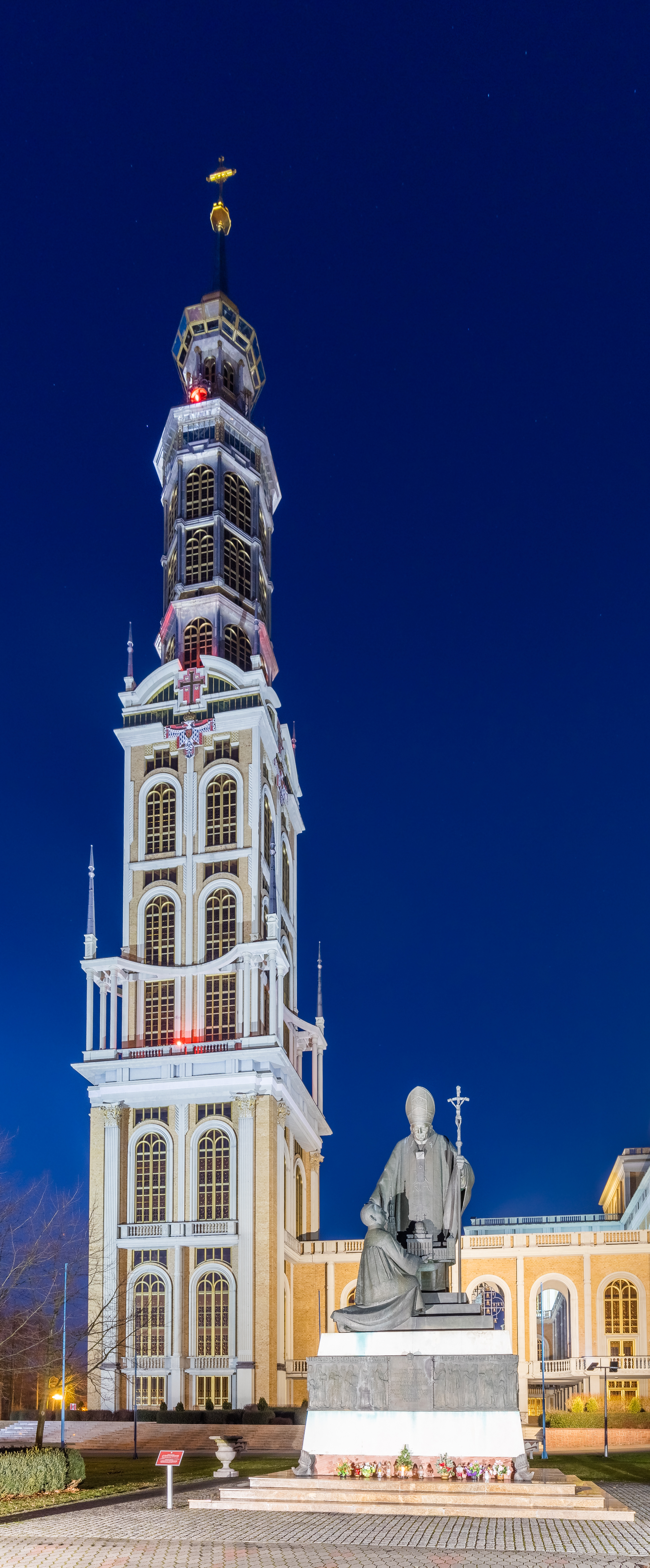
The tower is 141.5 m and has two viewing platforms

== See also ==
- Roman Catholic Marian churches
- List of tallest domes
- List of tallest churches
