= Elisabeth Park =

Park in Koekelberg and Ganshoren, Belgium

- Parc Élisabeth (French); Elisabethpark (Dutch)
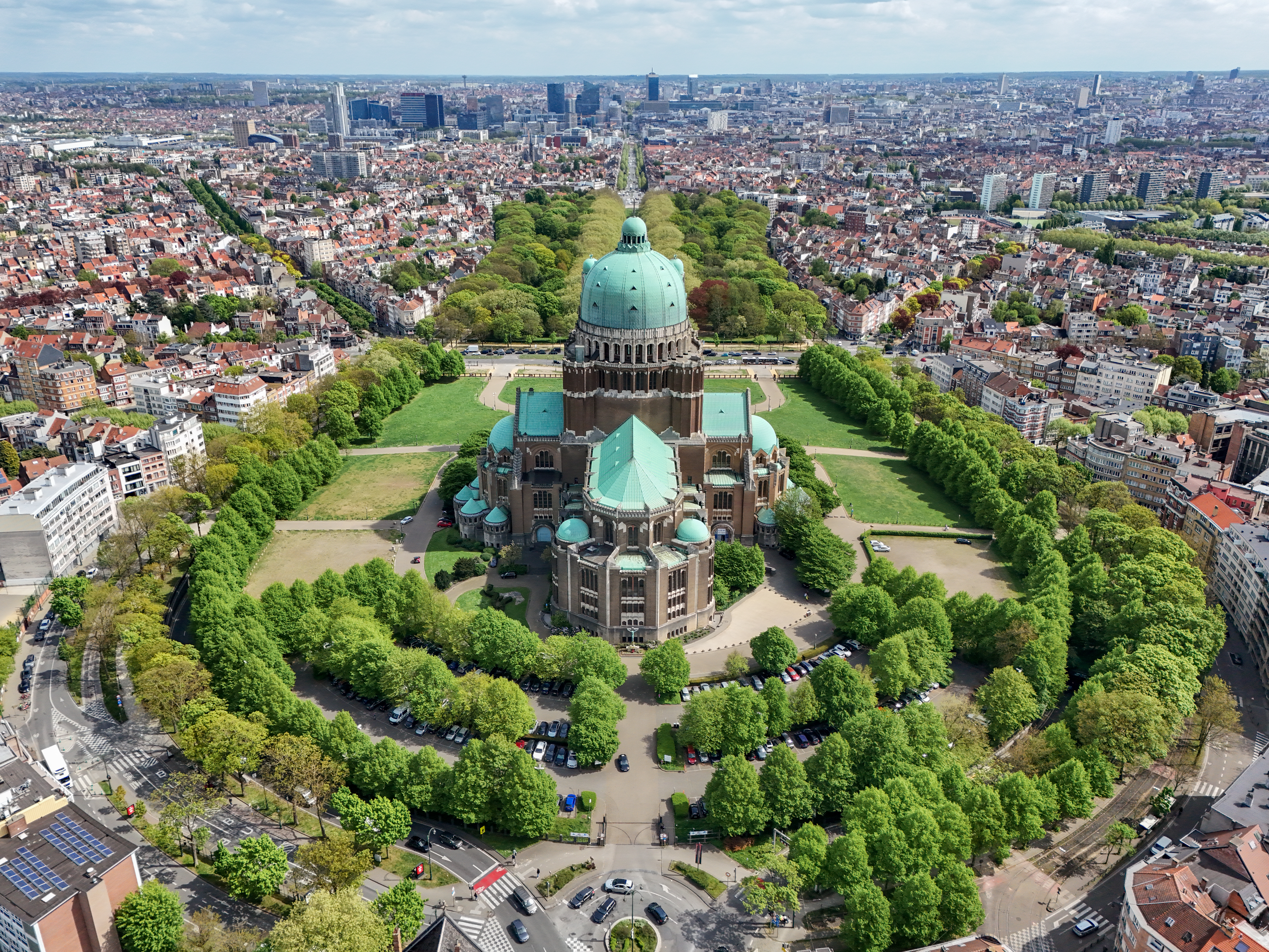
- Aerial view of Elisabeth Park and the Basilica of the Sacred Heart
- Interactive map of Elisabeth Park
- Type: Public park
- Location: Koekelberg and Ganshoren, Brussels-Capital Region, Belgium
- Coordinates: 50°51′54″N 4°19′28″E
- Area: 17 ha (42 acres)
- Created: 1868–1891
- Operator: Brussels Environment
- Status: Open year-round
- Public transit: 2 6 Simonis and Elisabeth

Elisabeth Park (French: Parc Élisabeth, pronounced [paʁk elizabɛt]; Dutch: Elisabethpark, pronounced [eːliˈzaːbɛtˌpɑr(ə)k]) is an urban public park located between the municipalities of Koekelberg and Ganshoren in Brussels, Belgium. It was designed between 1868 and 1891 by the architect and urbanist Victor Besme, as part of an urban project including the Koekelberg district, and covers an area of 17 ha (42 acres). It is named in honour of Queen Elisabeth, the third Queen of the Belgians and wife of King Albert I. At its head is the National Basilica of the Sacred Heart (or Koekelberg Basilica), one of the largest churches in the world.

The park lies at the end of the Boulevard Léopold II/Leopold II-laan, on the Koekelberg Plateau. Beyond the Place Eugène Simonis/Eugène Simonisplein, it forms part of the perspective extending the western boulevards of the Small Ring (Brussels' inner ring road). The Avenue des Gloires Nationales/Landsroemlaan, the Avenue du Panthéon/Pantheonlaan, the Avenue de la Liberté/Vrijheidslaan and the Avenue de Jette/Jetselaan form the boundaries of this green space. The Annie Cordy Tunnel also runs underground through its centre.

== Toponymy ==
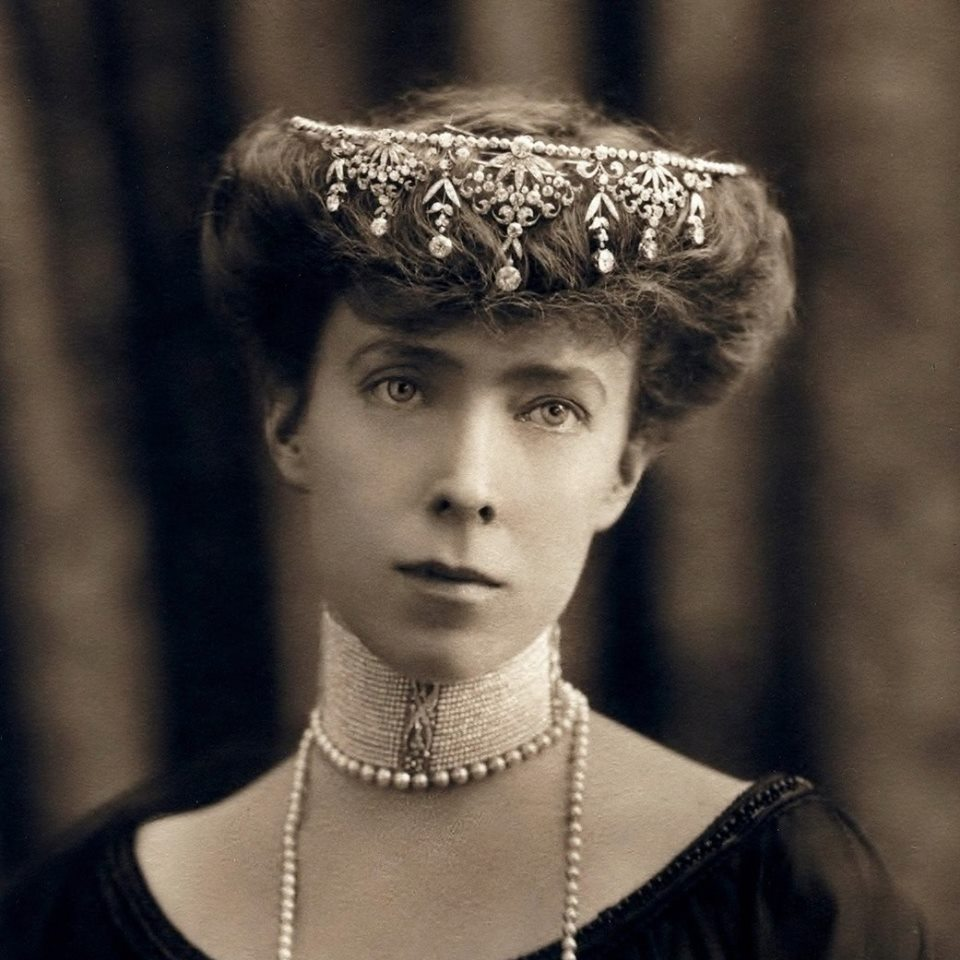
Queen Elisabeth, after whom the park is named

Elisabeth Park was originally named the Parc de Koekelberg/Koekelbergpark ("Koekelberg Park"), except for the section directly surrounding the Basilica of the Sacred Heart, known as the Parc du Sacré-Coeur/Heilig-Hartpark ("Sacred Heart Park"). The park's current name pays homage to Queen Elisabeth, the third Queen of the Belgians and wife of King Albert I.

== History ==
=== Early history ===
The park was created as part of the major urban development projects initiated by King Leopold II. Initially, it was intended to accentuate the view of a monumental Belgian Panthéon dedicated to great Belgians, but due to a lack of funds and enthusiasm from the population, Leopold II's idea was never realised. The names of the adjacent avenues—the Avenue des Gloires Nationales/Landsroemlaan ("National Glories Avenue"), and the Avenue du Panthéon/Pantheonlaan ("Pantheon Avenue")—still attest to this grandiose project.

The Koekelberg municipal council approved the park's construction on 8 December 1868, based on plans by the architect and urbanist Victor Besme. The Compagnie foncière du Quartier Royal de Koekelberg, responsible for subdividing this part of the municipality, had made the land available free of charge. However, this company went bankrupt in 1877, causing delays in the district's urban development. Management was then taken over by the Société anonyme du Quartier Léopold II. Work did not begin until 1880, and the park was finally inaugurated in 1891.

=== 20th and 21st centuries ===
From 1905 onwards, Elisabeth Park became the construction site of the Basilica of the Sacred Heart. Between 1946 and 1950, motorcycle races were held around the basilica through the park and the Place Eugène Simonis/Eugène Simonisplein. In the 1950s, the park was bisected to make way for an urban motorway intended to lead visitors to the 1958 Brussels World's Fair (Expo 58). With the construction of the Leopold II Tunnel (now known as the Annie Cordy Tunnel) in 1985, the park regained its unity.

The park was classified as a landscape on 8 November 1972, and has been a protected area of the Brussels-Capital Region since 14 July 2006. Its central avenue was redesigned in 1990 by the Department of Public Works and Transportation. The park is currently undergoing a new redesign and renovation, including improvements to its infrastructure, flower beds, and trees.

== Description ==
Royal monogram of King Leopold II

The layout of Elisabeth Park forms the L-shaped royal monogram of King Leopold II, during whose reign it was designed in the perspective of the Boulevard Léopold II/Leopold II-laan and the Koekelberg Basilica. The park's large public promenade is reminiscent, in some respects, of the Parc du Cinquantenaire/Jubelpark, which dates from the same period. It is laid out as a double avenue with a wide, grassy central median, flanked by side lawns, groves of trees, and shrubs. Sycamore maples line the main double avenue on the side facing the Avenue du Panthéon. The Boulevard Léopold II, for its part, is lined with plane trees.

The park, which is maintained by Brussels Environment, is home to a number of remarkable trees, including dwarf chestnuts, American lindens, and white birches, to name a few. Since 2004, hundreds of ring-necked parakeets, which were accidentally released, have been gathering in the trees almost every evening. During the day, they fly out to forage for food in the city. The park also contains a well-preserved former bandstand, a sports field, a playground, and a bench designed by the Polish sculptor Halinka Jakubowska.

== Events ==
The park hosts the Festival Plazey in the summer, a music festival open to other performing arts (i.e. dance, circus, workshops, etc.). From 1992 to 2006, it also hosted the first fourteen editions of the Spanish festival Euroferia. Its success caused problems for the park, forcing the organisers to move subsequent editions to the Heysel/Heizel Plateau in northern Brussels.

== Gallery ==
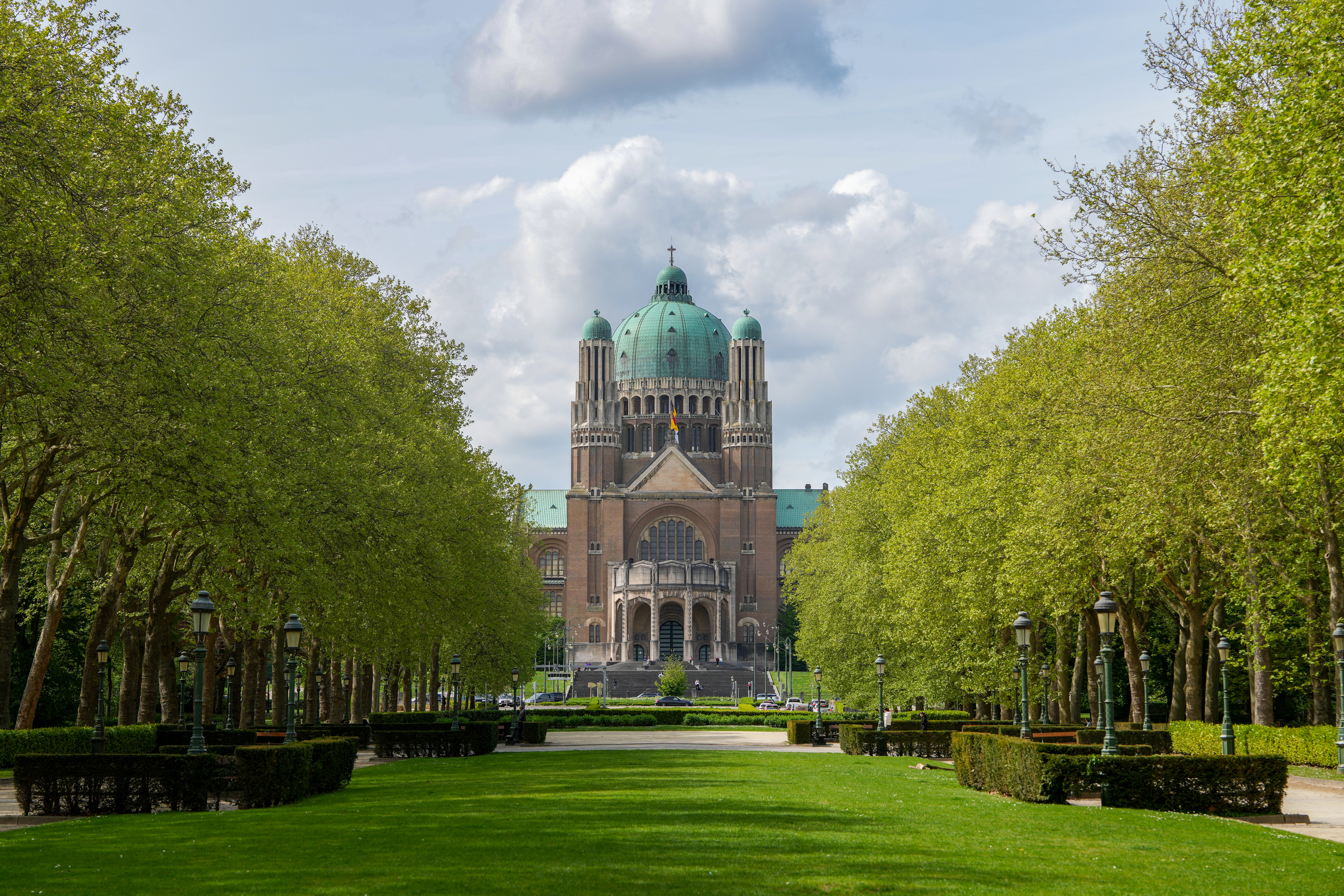
View towards the Koekelberg Basilica

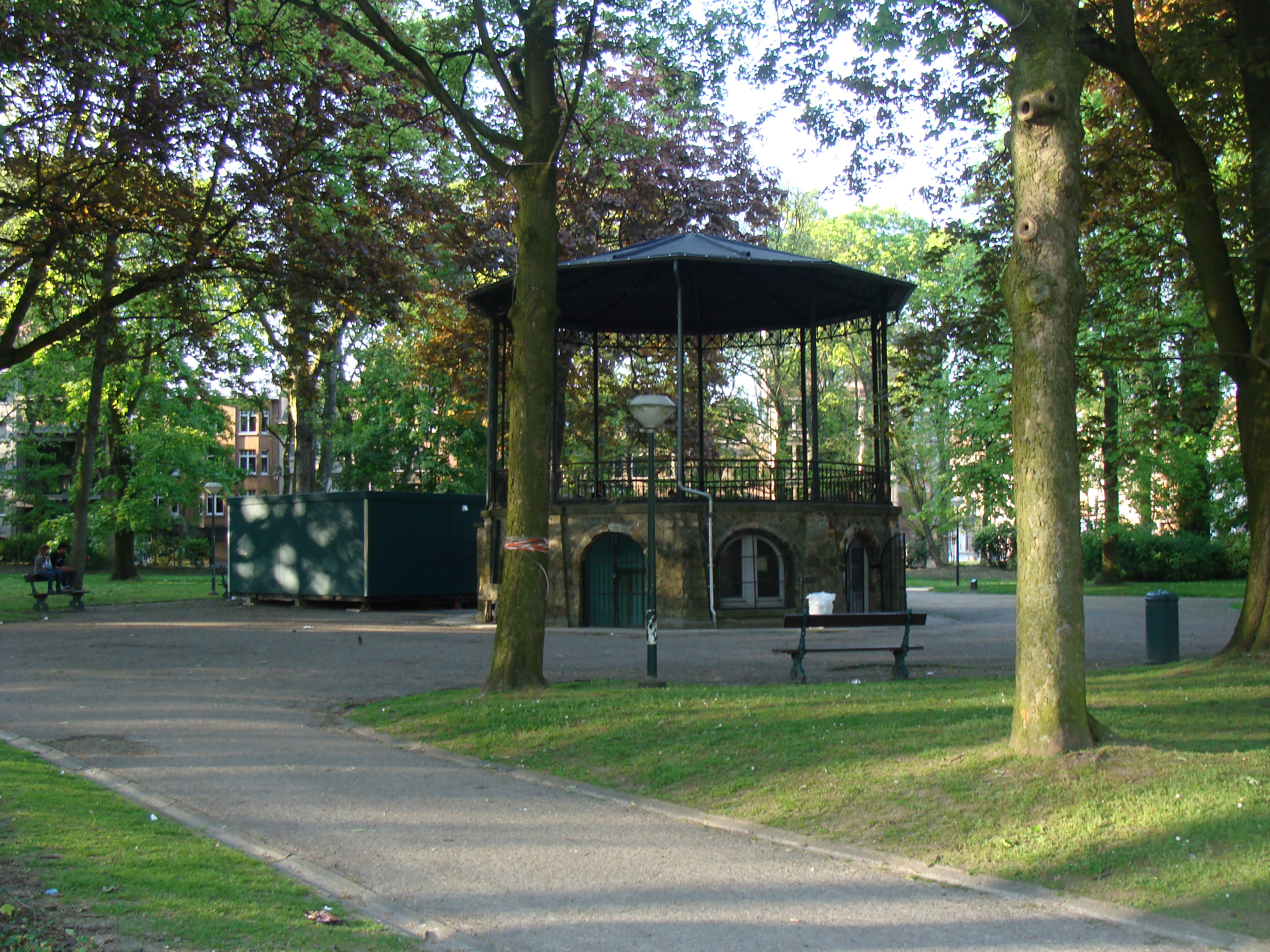
Bandstand

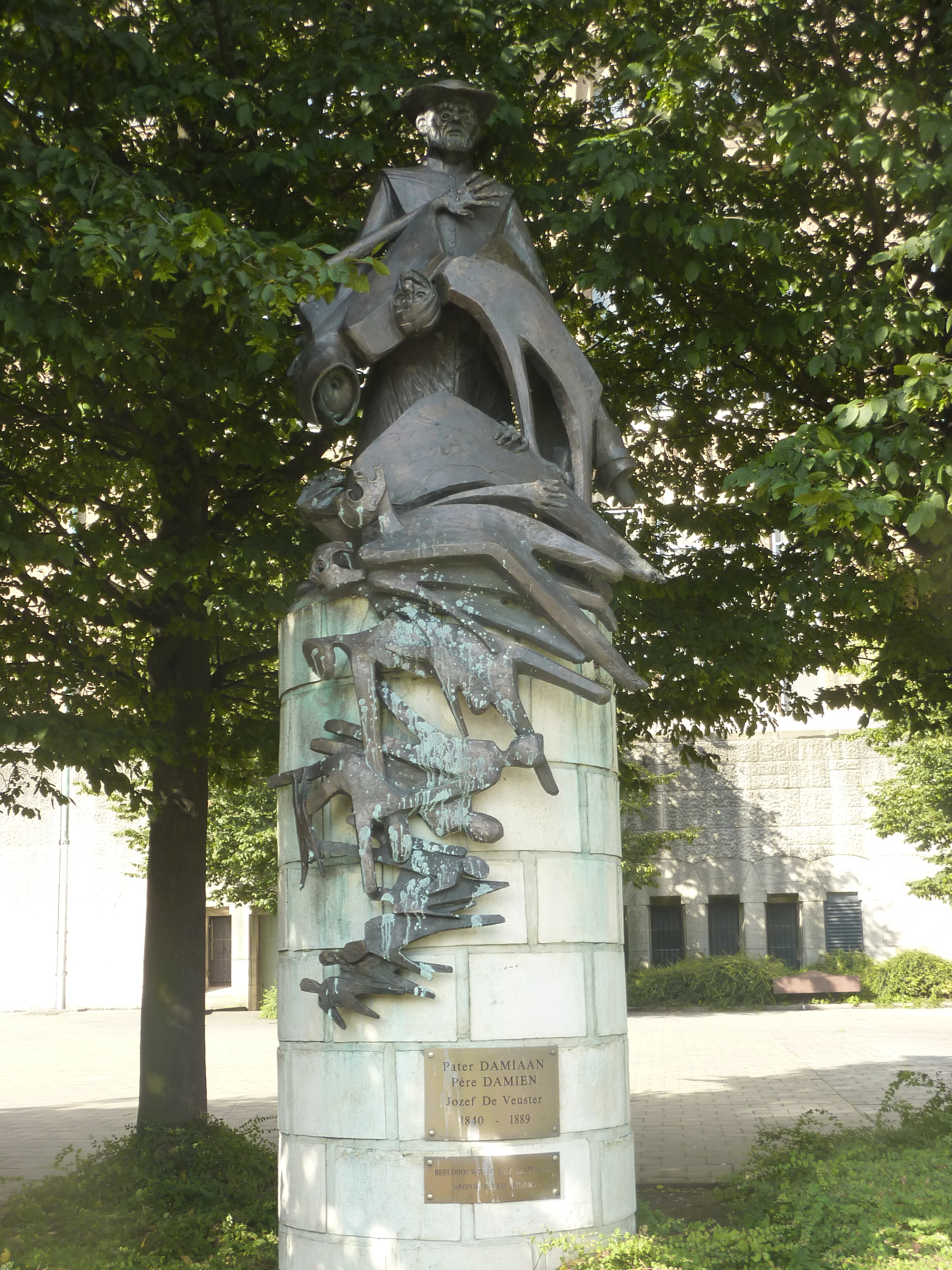
Father Damien statue

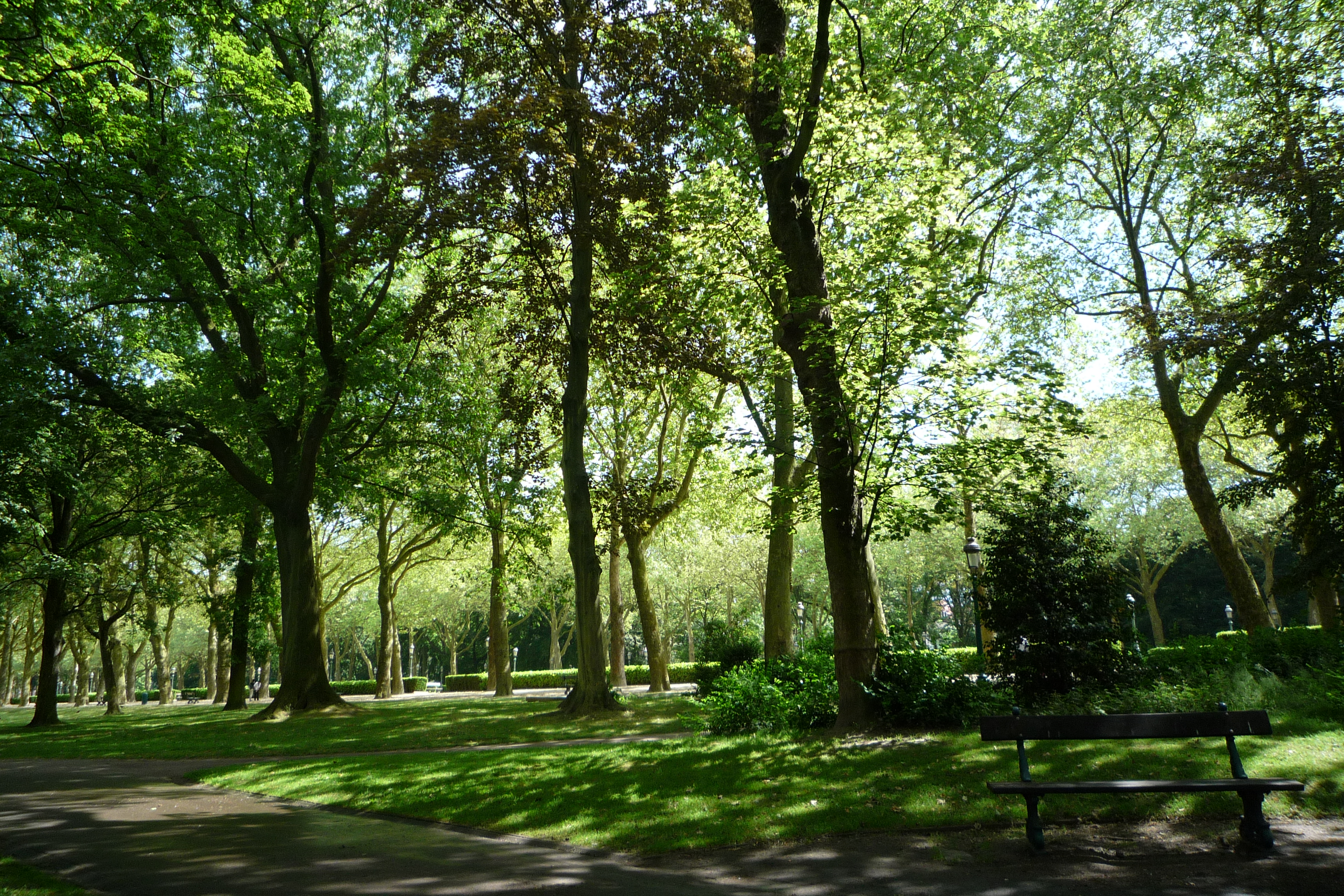
Wooded area

== See also ==
- List of parks and gardens in Brussels
- History of Brussels
- Belgium in the long nineteenth century
