= Tipsy Tribe =

Brewery and distillery in Brussels, Belgium

Tipsy Tribe is a craft brewery and distillery in Brussels and home of the first whiskey made in the city. Located in the Koekelberg municipality, it is the only establishment in Brussels to have both a brewery and a distillery under a single roof.

Tipsy Tribe produces a range of craft beers and spirits including gin, vodka and whiskey.
