= Annie Cordy Tunnel =

Road tunnel in Brussels, Belgium

Coordinates: 50.8624°N 4.3333°E

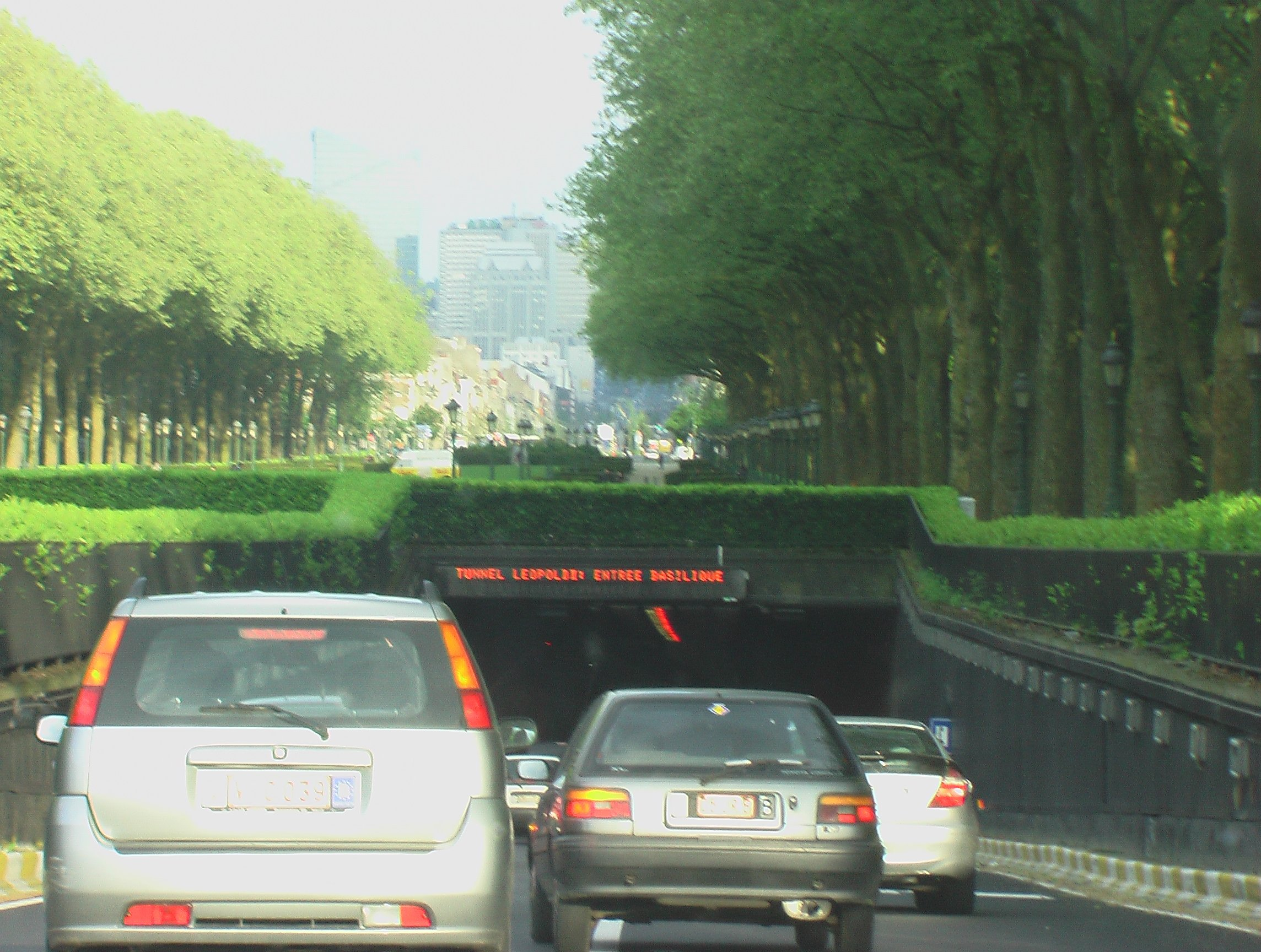

Overview
- Other name: Leopold II Tunnel
- Location: Brussels, Belgium
- Status: Open
- Route: R20

Operation
- Opened: 1986
- Traffic: Automotive
- Toll: No

Technical
- Length: 2,534 m (8,314 ft)
- No. of lanes: 4 (per tube)

The Annie Cordy Tunnel (French: Tunnel Annie Cordy; Dutch: Annie Cordytunnel), formerly the Leopold II Tunnel (French: Tunnel Léopold II; Dutch: Leopold II-tunnel), is a traffic tunnel in Brussels, Belgium. The tunnel, under the Boulevard Léopold II/Leopold II-laan, connects the Rogier Tunnel and the Small Ring (Brussels' inner ring road) with the Basilica Tunnel and the A10/E40 via the Avenue Charles-Quint/Keizer Karellaan. The tunnel is an important arterial road for traffic leaving or entering Brussels. It is the western approach road for Brussels. With a length of 2,534 m (8,314 ft), it is also the longest road tunnel in Belgium.

== Renovation and renaming ==
In 2012, the Brussels-Capital Region started a procedure to renew this tunnel through public-private partnership in the 2014-2018 period and to outsource its maintenance for 25 years. The works were budgeted at €105 million. In 2016, the tunnel was closed several times due to falling debris.

The tunnel was previously named after King Leopold II, the second King of the Belgians. In September 2020, the Brussels Government decided to consult the population about a new name for the tunnel in an effort to increase the number of female-named streets in the city. In March 2021, the results of the public referendum for a new female namesake for the tunnel were announced. It was decided to rename the tunnel after singer Annie Cordy, after planned renovations were completed.
