= Boulevard Léopold II =

Thoroughfare in Brussels, Belgium

Boulevard Léopold II (French); Leopold II-laan (Dutch)
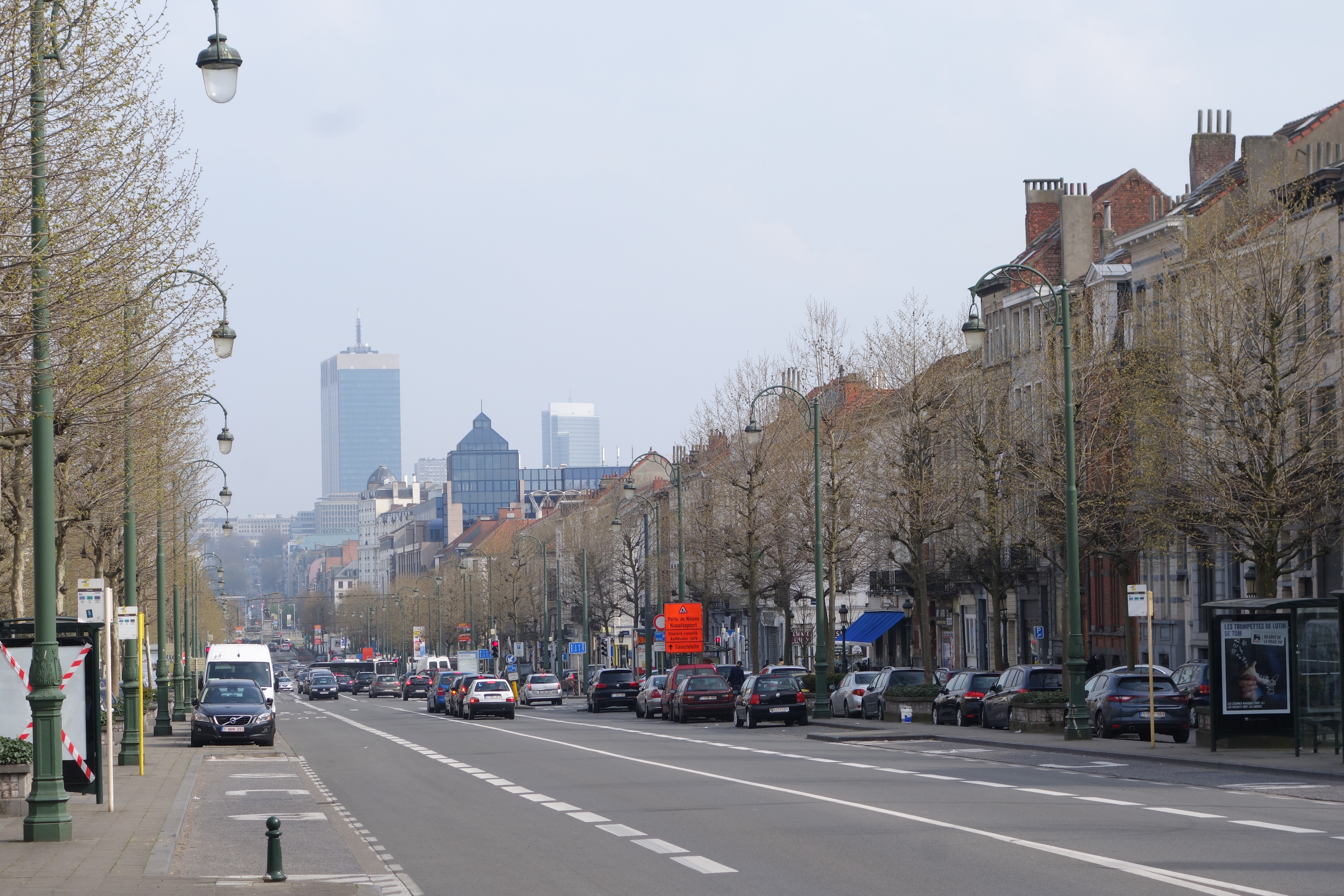
- The Boulevard Léopold II/Leopold II-laan in Brussels

- Location within Brussels Location within Belgium
- Namesake: King Leopold II
- Type: Boulevard
- Location: Koekelberg and Molenbeek-Saint-Jean, Brussels-Capital Region, Belgium
- Postal code: 1080, 1081
- Coordinates: 50°51′44″N 4°20′04″E
- From: Brussels–Charleroi Canal
- To: Basilica of Koekelberg

The Boulevard Léopold II (French) or Leopold II-laan (Dutch) is a major thoroughfare in Brussels, Belgium, running through the municipalities of Koekelberg and Molenbeek-Saint-Jean. It is named in honour of King Leopold II, the second King of the Belgians.

== History ==
The boulevard was laid out in the 19th century according to the plans of the architect and urbanist Victor Besme. In 1873, it was officially named the Boulevard Léopold II/Leopold II-laan ("Leopold II Boulevard") in honour of King Leopold II, the second King of the Belgians.

In 1956, in preparation for the 1958 Brussels World's Fair (Expo 58), a temporary viaduct, the Viaduct of Koekelberg, was built to accommodate increased road traffic. It was demolished in the early 1990s.

== See also ==
- List of streets in Brussels
- History of Brussels
- Belgium in the long nineteenth century
