= Basilica of the Sacred Heart, Brussels =

Basilica in Brussels, Belgium

National Basilica of the Sacred Heart
- Basilique nationale du Sacré-Cœur (French); Nationale Basiliek van het Heilig-Hart (Dutch)
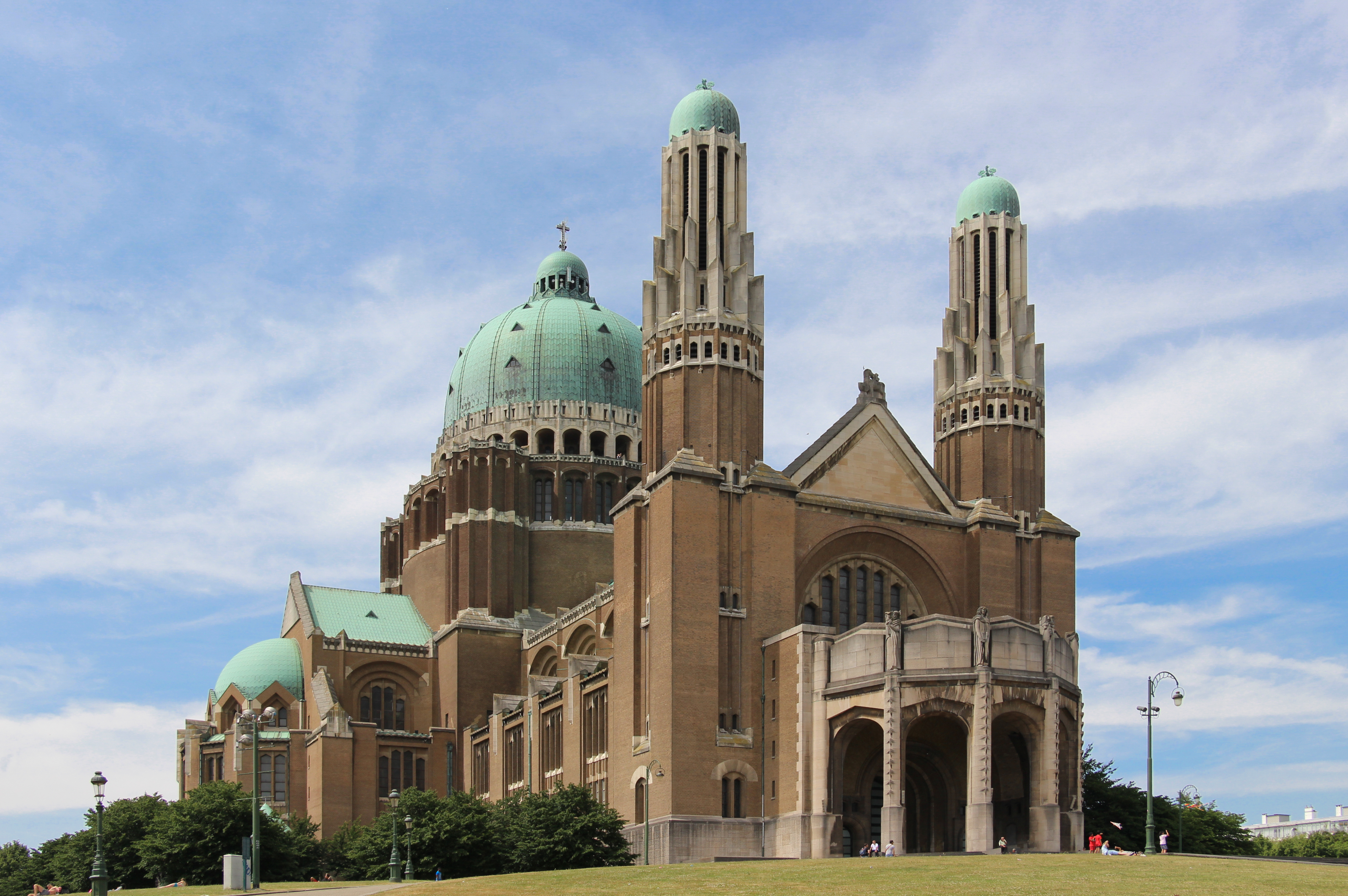
- National Basilica of the Sacred Heart
- National Basilica of the Sacred Heart
- 50°52′00″N 4°19′02″E
- Location: Parvis de la Basilique / Basiliekvoorplein 1; 1083 Ganshoren, Brussels-Capital Region
- Country: Belgium
- Denomination: Catholic Church
- Sui iuris church: Latin Church
- Website: Official website

History
- Status: Minor basilica; Parish church
- Dedication: Sacred Heart
- Consecrated: 1935

Architecture
- Functional status: Active
- Architect(s): Pierre Langerock, Albert Van Huffel, Paul Rome
- Architectural type: Basilica
- Style: Art Deco
- Groundbreaking: 12 October 1905; 121 years ago
- Completed: 11 November 1970; 56 years ago

Specifications
- Capacity: 3,500
- Length: 164.5 metres (540 ft)
- Width: 107.80 metres (353.7 ft)
- Height: 89 metres (292 ft)
- Materials: Reinforced concrete, terracotta layering, bricks, dimension stone

Administration
- Archdiocese: Mechelen–Brussels

Clergy
- Archbishop: Luc Terlinden (Primate of Belgium)

The National Basilica of the Sacred Heart (French: Basilique nationale du Sacré-Cœur; Dutch: Nationale Basiliek van het Heilig-Hart) is a Catholic minor basilica and parish church in Brussels, Belgium. It is dedicated to the Sacred Heart, inspired by the Basilique du Sacré-Cœur in Paris. Symbolically, King Leopold II laid the first stone in 1905 during the celebrations of the 75th anniversary of Belgian independence. The construction was halted by the two world wars and finished only in 1970. Belonging to the Metropolitan Archdiocese of Mechelen–Brussels, it is the 17th largest church by area in the world and the largest in Belgium.

Located at the head of Elisabeth Park atop the Koekelberg Plateau, between the municipalities of Koekelberg and Ganshoren, the church is popularly known as the Koekelberg Basilica (French: Basilique de Koekelberg; Dutch: Basiliek van Koekelberg). The massive brick and reinforced concrete structure, in Art Deco style of neo-Byzantine inspiration, features two thinner towers and a nearly as high green copper dome that rises 89 metres (292 ft) above ground, dominating Brussels' north-western skyline.

== History ==
=== Inception ===
In the mid-19th century, King Leopold I dreamed of turning the uninhabited Koekelberg Plateau in north-western Brussels into a royal residence. Following his death, his son, King Leopold II, envisaged building a Belgian Panthéon dedicated to great Belgians there. Inspired by the French Panthéon in Paris, it was intended to commemorate the 50th anniversary of Belgian independence. However, the king dropped this project due to a lack of funds and of enthusiasm from the population. It is nonetheless still attested today by the two large avenues adjoining the site: the Avenue des Gloires Nationales/Landsroemlaan ("National Glories Avenue"), and the Avenue du Panthéon/Pantheonlaan ("Pantheon Avenue").

In 1902, Leopold II visited the Basilique du Sacré-Cœur of Paris, and inspired by it, decided to build a pilgrimage church back home, a national shrine to the Sacred Heart of Jesus. While he saw the opportunity to build his national Panthéon at the Namur Gate in Ixelles, Leopold II accepted that the land of Koekelberg be ceded by the Compagnie immobilière de Belgique to the Catholic Church with the intent of building the national basilica there instead. The deed of donation of 3.32 ha (8.2 acres) of land was signed on 12 December, and confirmed on 31 December through a royal decree.

=== Neo-Gothic basilica (1905–1914) ===
The initial vision of the Leuven-based architect Pierre Langerock was a sumptuous neo-Gothic basilica, inspired by the "ideal cathedral" of French architectural theorist Eugène Viollet-le-Duc. Langerock envisaged an edifice bristling with six towers of a hundred metres or more, the highest of which would have stood at 146 metres (479 ft) above the crossing.

Leopold II laid the first stone on 12 October 1905, during celebrations commemorating the 75th anniversary of Belgian independence. Foundation works began in 1909, but the project was delayed due to the king's death on 17 December 1909. Financing the basilica's construction also soon became a problem, so only the foundations had been finished when World War I broke out. In his pastoral letter for Christmas 1914, Cardinal Mercier gave the basilica a new meaning:

As soon as Peace shines on our country, we will rebuild on our ruins, and we hope to put the crowning touch on this work of reconstruction by building, on the heights of the capital of free and catholic Belgium, the National Basilica of the Sacred Heart.

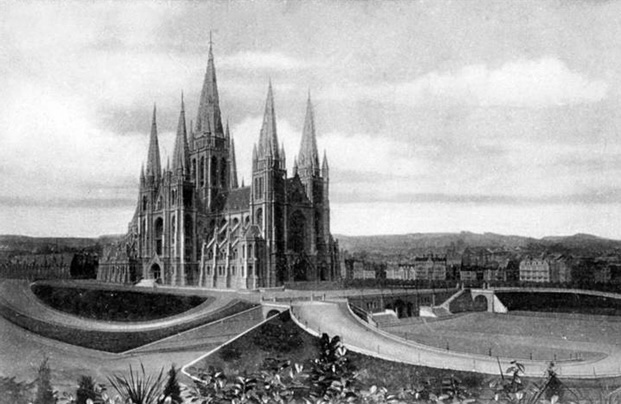
Neo-Gothic design for the National Basilica of the Sacred Heart by Pierre Langerock (1905)

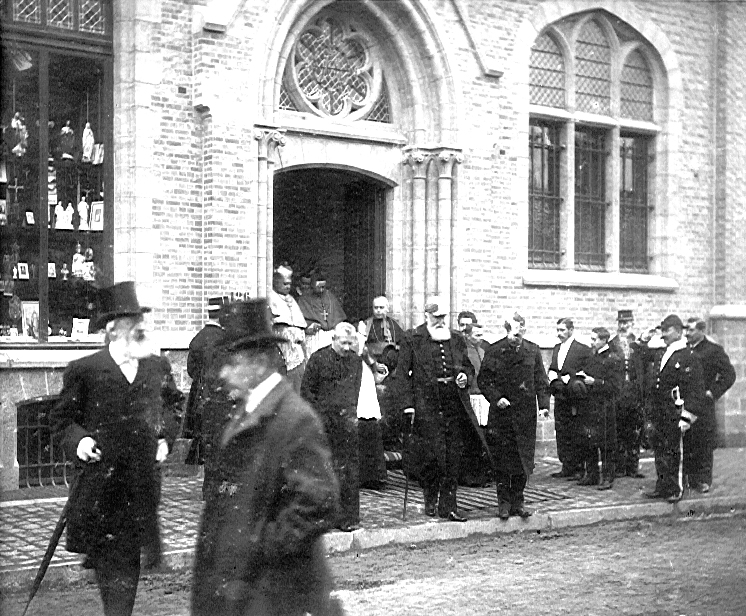
King Leopold II leaving the provisional church for the laying of the first stone (12 October 1905)

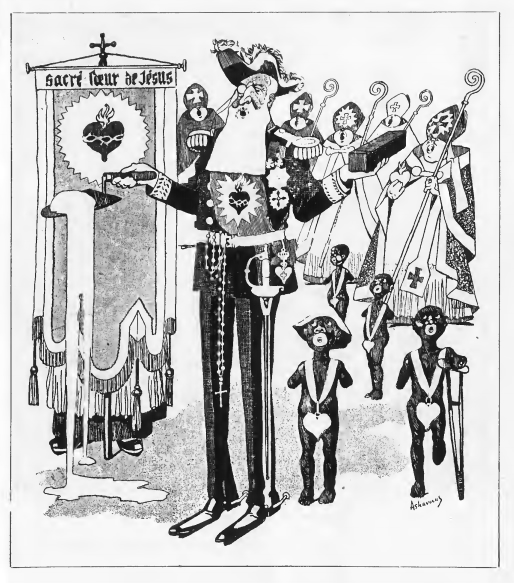
Cartoon depicting Leopold II laying the first stone (12 October 1905)

=== Art Deco basilica (1919–present) ===
On 29 June 1919, King Albert I and a large crowd associated themselves with this promise in a ceremony on the Koekelberg Plateau. However, it was impossible to resume Langerock's plan due to the state of public finances. A new design, in Art Deco style with neo-Byzantine inspiration by the Ghent architect Albert Van Huffel, was thus adopted. In 1925, a 1/40 scale model of this final design won the great architectural prize at the International Exhibition of Modern Decorative and Industrial Arts in Paris. This model, produced with great care, still stands today in the basilica.

The adaptation and extension of the existing foundations were undertaken from January 1926, and building the apse began in August 1930. Following Van Huffel's death on 16 March 1935, the construction was taken over by his assistant, the architect-engineer Paul Rome. Cardinal Jozef-Ernest van Roey consecrated the unfinished basilica and opened it for worship on 14 October 1935, after obtaining special permission from Pope Pius XI. The base of the cupola had been finished in 1940 when World War II stalled work again. Building resumed in September 1944, and the main nave was completed in 1951.

The basilica was consecrated by Cardinal Van Roey on 13 and 14 October 1951, and Pope Pius XII elevated it to the rank of minor basilica on 28 January 1952. In 1953, the two towers were completed. The south transept opened in 1958, and the north transept in 1962. The cupola and thus the external structure was finished in 1969, and on 11 November 1970, the ceremony for the 25th anniversary of the episcopate of Archbishop of Mechelen–Brussels, Cardinal Leo Joseph Suenens, marked the basilica's completion. On 4 June 1995, Father Damien was beatified in the basilica by Pope John Paul II.

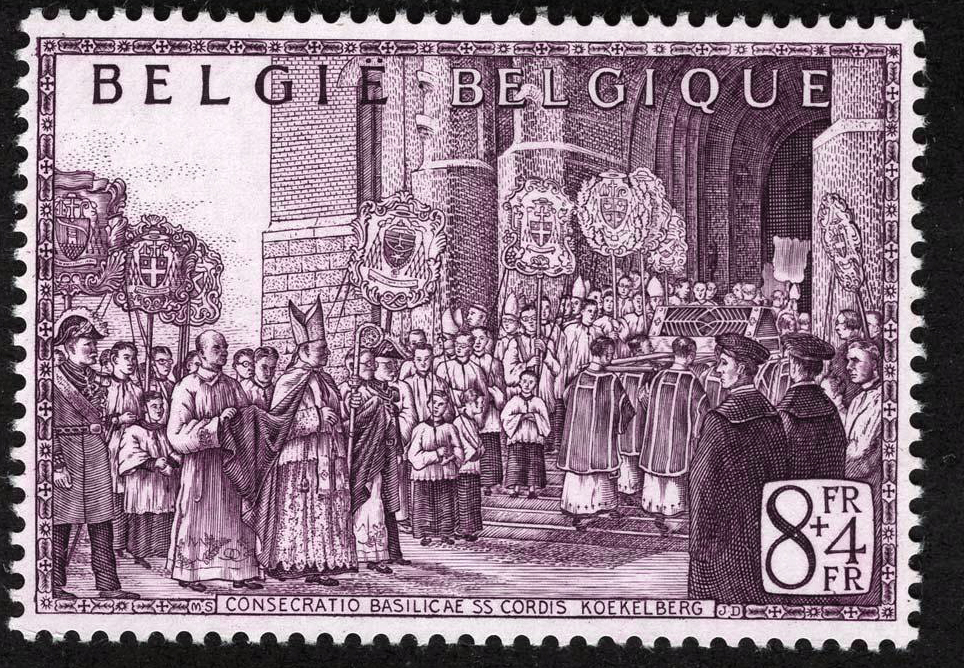
Postage stamp commemorating the basilica's consecration (14 October 1951)

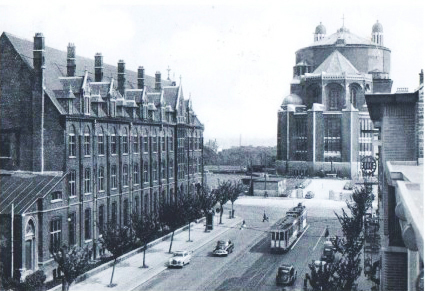
Rear view of the basilica and the Collège du Sacré-Cœur of Ganshoren, c. 1956

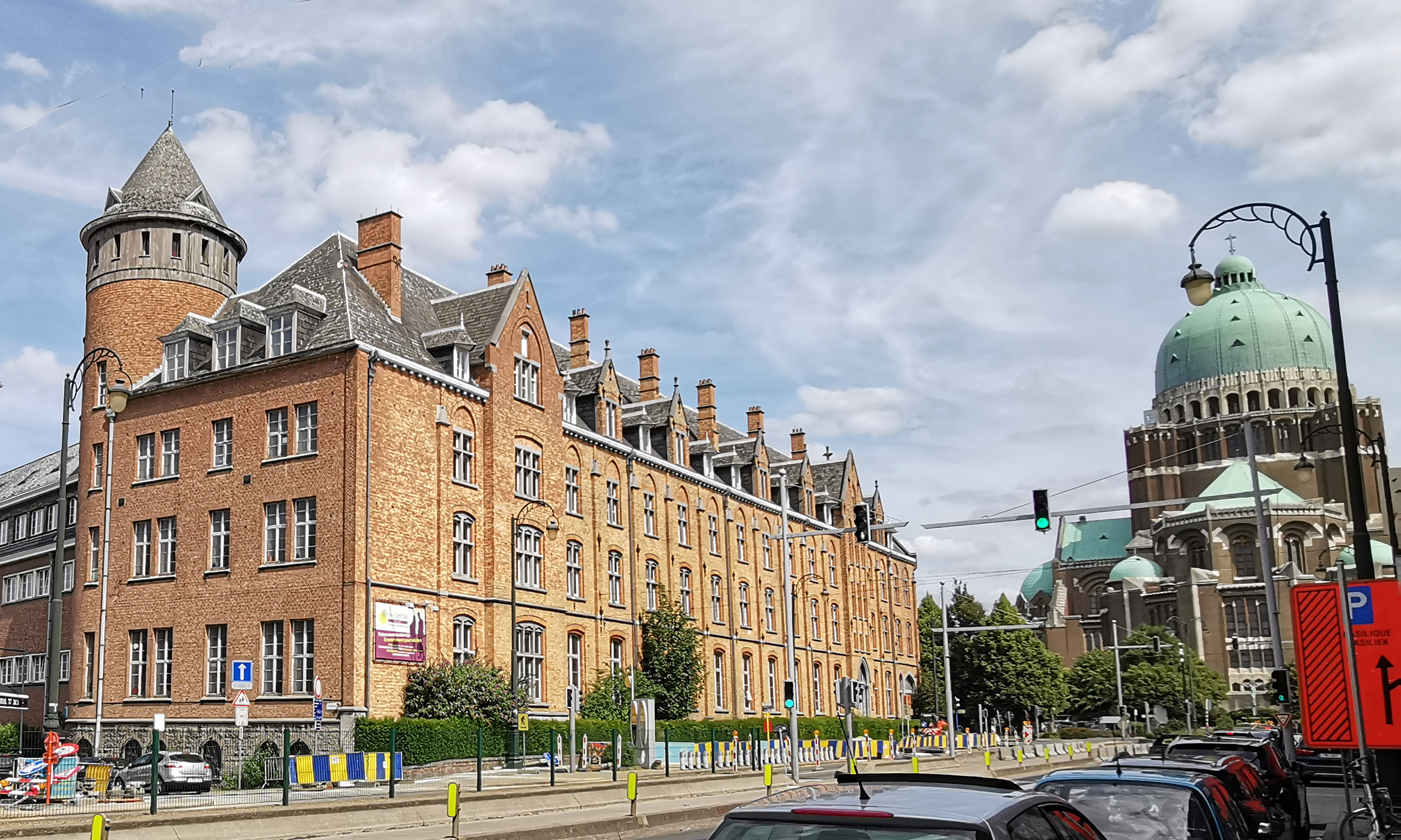
The same view as it appears today

== Building ==
=== Dimensions ===
The Koekelberg Basilica is one of the largest Art Deco buildings in the world, and was, at the time of its construction, the fifth largest church building in the world, at 89 metres (292 ft) high and 164.5 metres (540 ft) long (outside length). Nowadays, it remains one of the largest basilicas, and can accommodate up to 3,500 worshippers. The main nave is 141 metres (463 ft) long, and at its widest, the building is 107 metres (351 ft). The cupola rises 89 metres (292 ft) above ground and has a diameter of 33 metres (108 ft).

The building hosts Catholic liturgies in Belgium's two main national languages (Dutch and French), as well as conferences, and exhibitions (as in 2007–08, the International Leonardo da Vinci Expo). It is also home to a restaurant, a Catholic radio station, a theatre, and two museums.

=== Exterior ===
The building's exterior combines reinforced concrete with terracotta layering, Dutch belvédère bricks, and white dimension stone from Burgundy. The green roofs and domes are of verdigris patinated Congolese copper.

The main entrance is flanked by two slender towers, 65 metres (213 ft) high, topped with reduced domes. The narthex-portal has a large balcony intended for open-air Masses, the parapet of which was carved with a bas-relief depicting Christ the Merciful. Its pillars are extended by statues of the four evangelists by the Belgian-Danish sculptor Harry Elstrøm. From left to right, they depict Saint John and his eagle (1955), Saint Luke carrying the bull (1958), Saint Mark enlaced by the lion (1958), and Saint Matthew with man (1964).

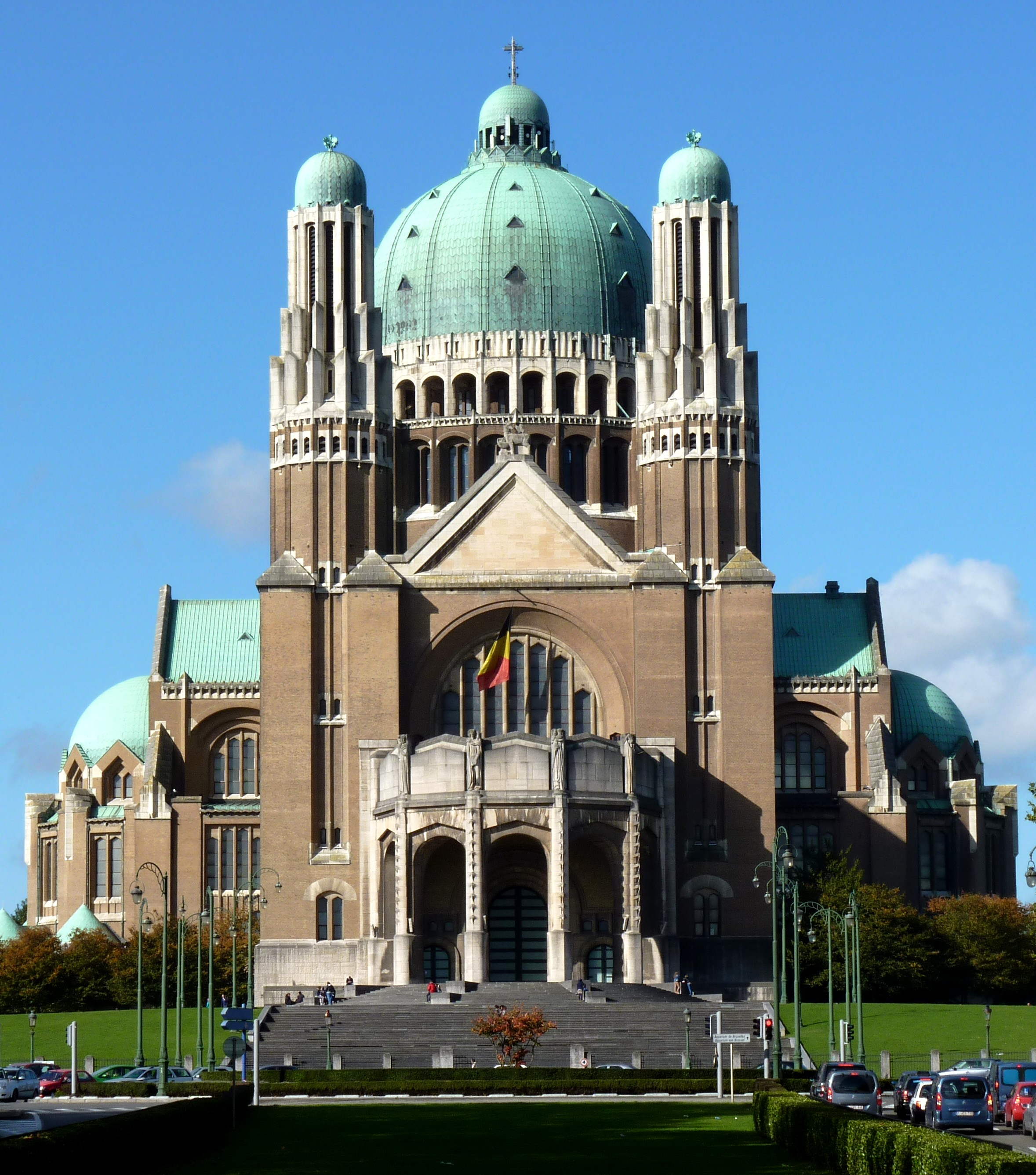
Frontal view

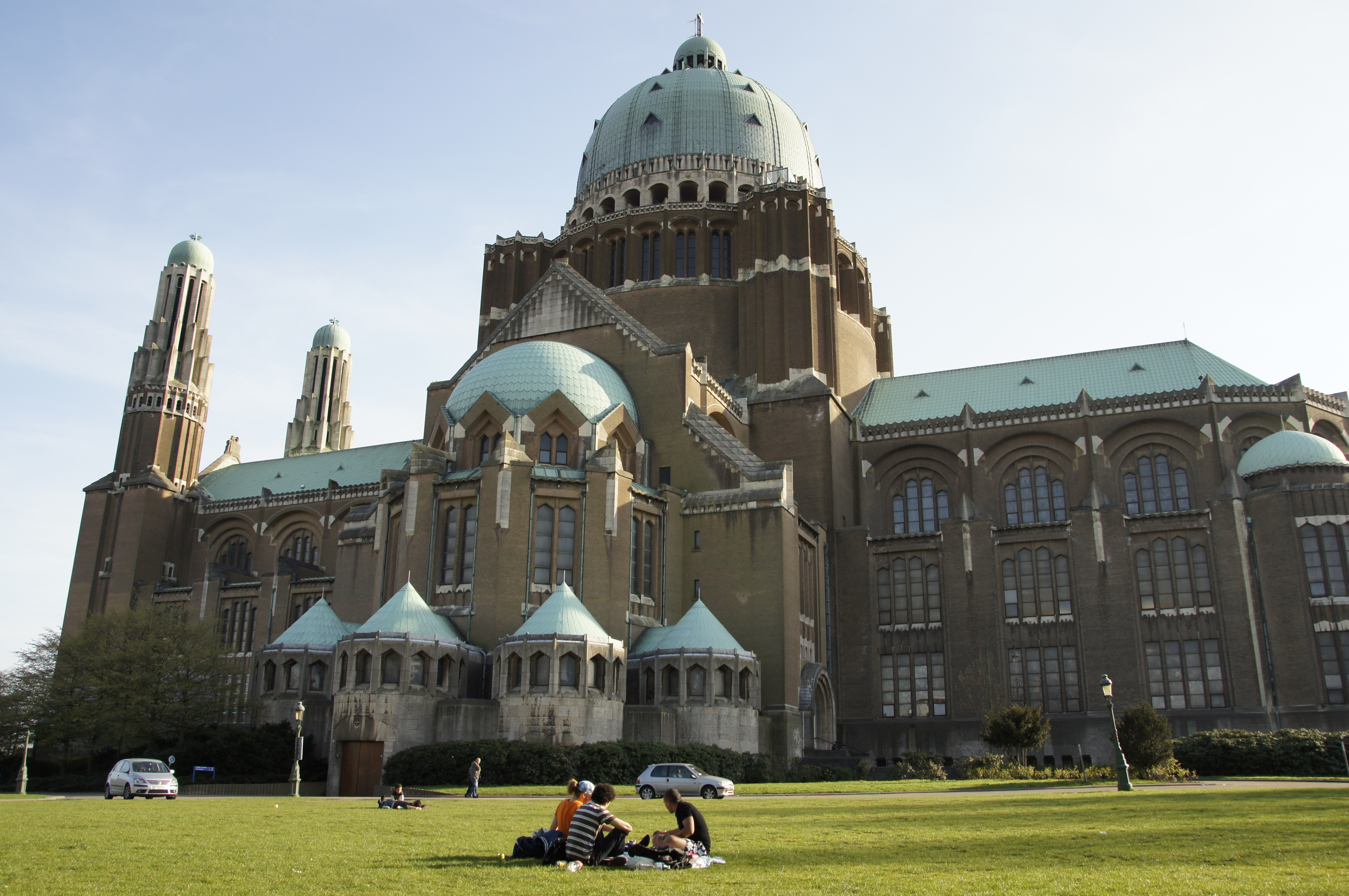
Lateral view

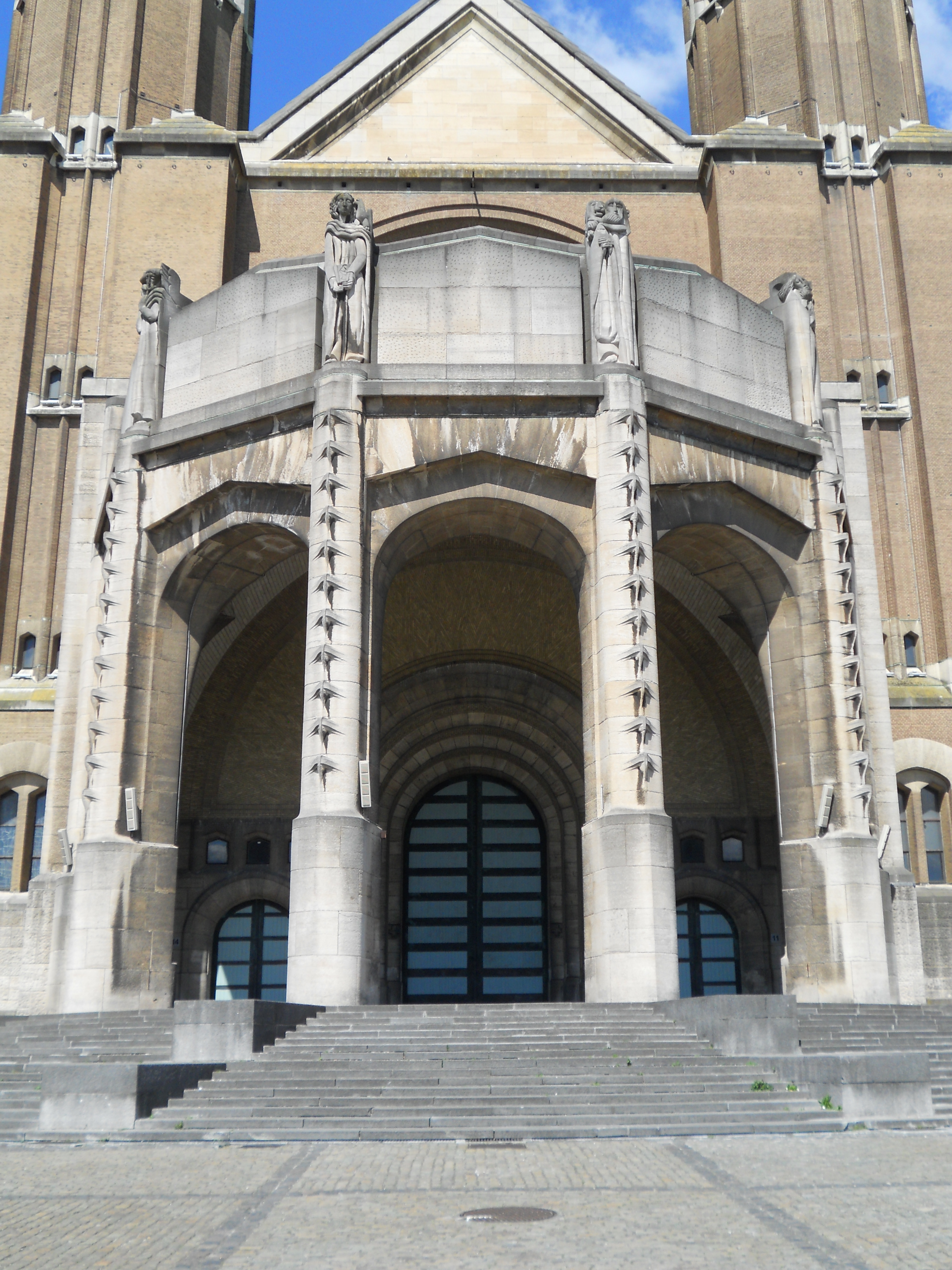
Portal

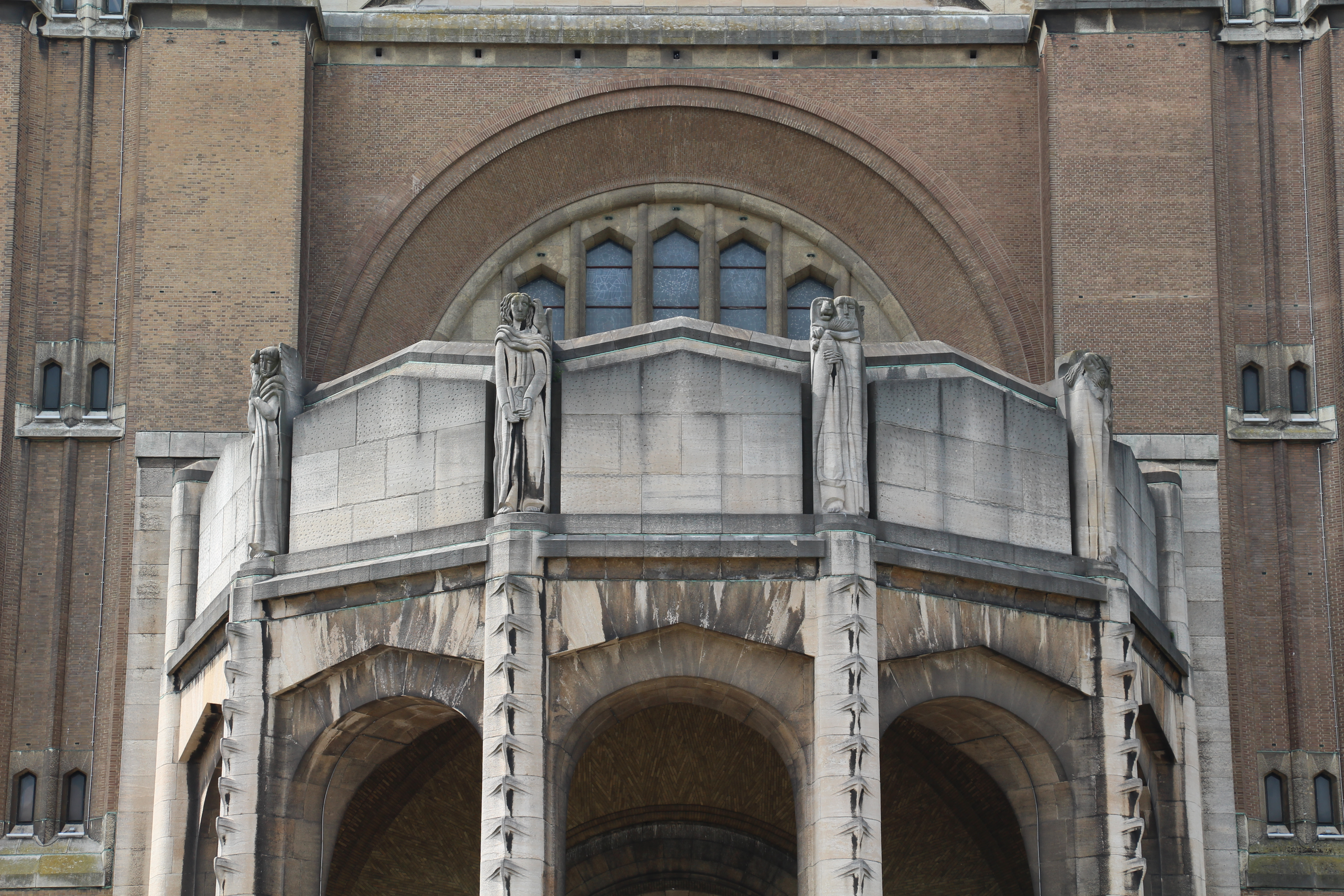
Closeup of the portal

=== Interior ===
The basilica's interior possesses a rich architectural heritage and holds an exceptional collection of works of art, including a Tête du Christ bronze sculpture by Constant Permeke, thirty-one engravings by Joan Miró on the Canticle of the Sun by Saint Francis of Assisi, a painting by Antoni Tàpies, a photographic work by San Damon called When Jesus Became Christ on the theme of the crucifixion, seven original lithographs by Alfred Manessier on the theme of Easter and the Mount of Olives, works by James Ensor, a painting by Geneviève Asse on the biblical theme, as well as paintings by Albert Servaes. The painter Anto Carte designed the eight stained glass windows representing the life of Jesus, and the artist Ri Coëme an additional twenty-eight.

The altar, liturgical furnishings, and the cross in the choir were fashioned by the sculptor Jacques Dieudonné. The basilica also contains two organs: a large 1959 modern choir organ and a 1965 classical choir organ in the crypt.

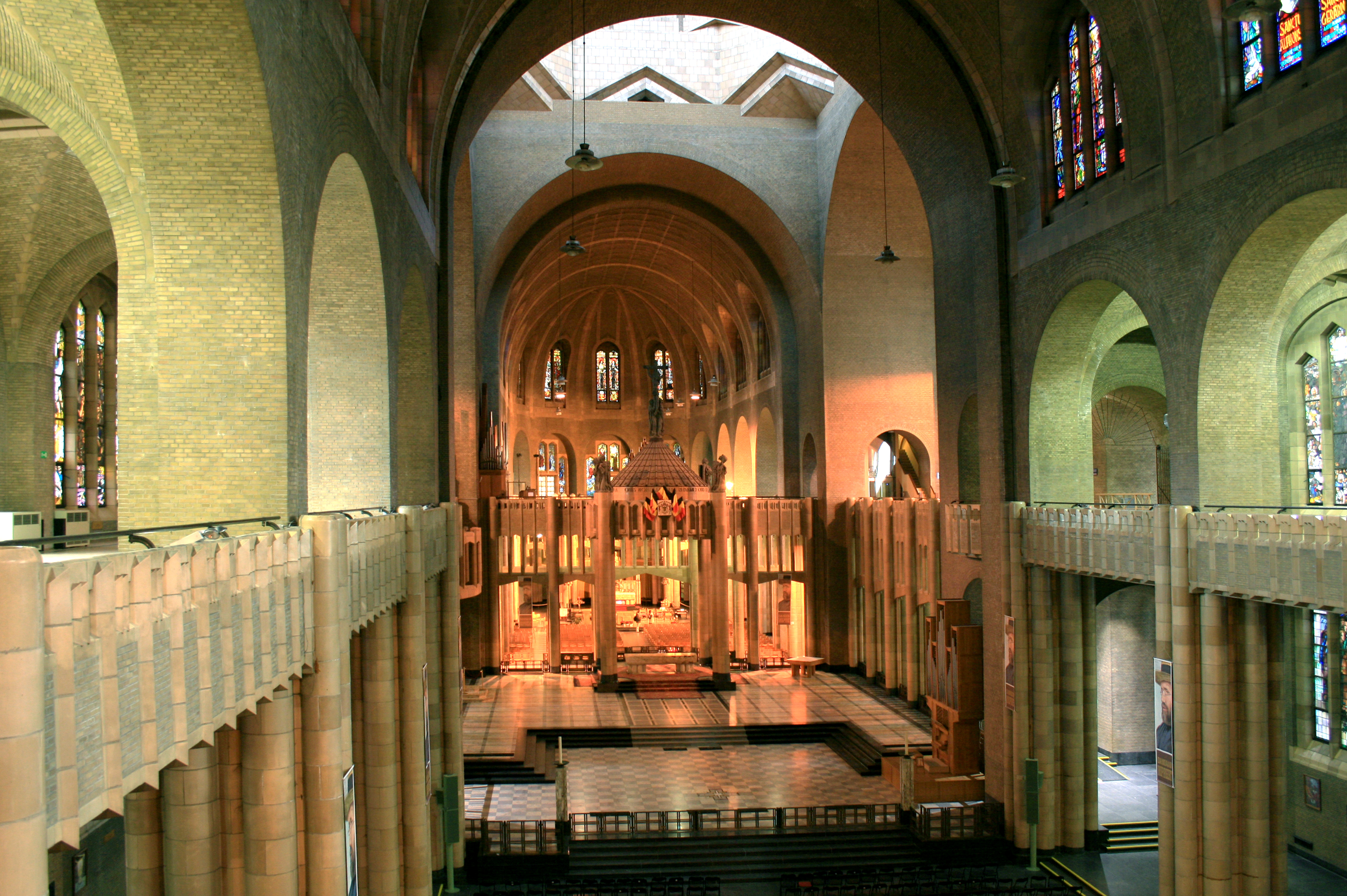
Central nave

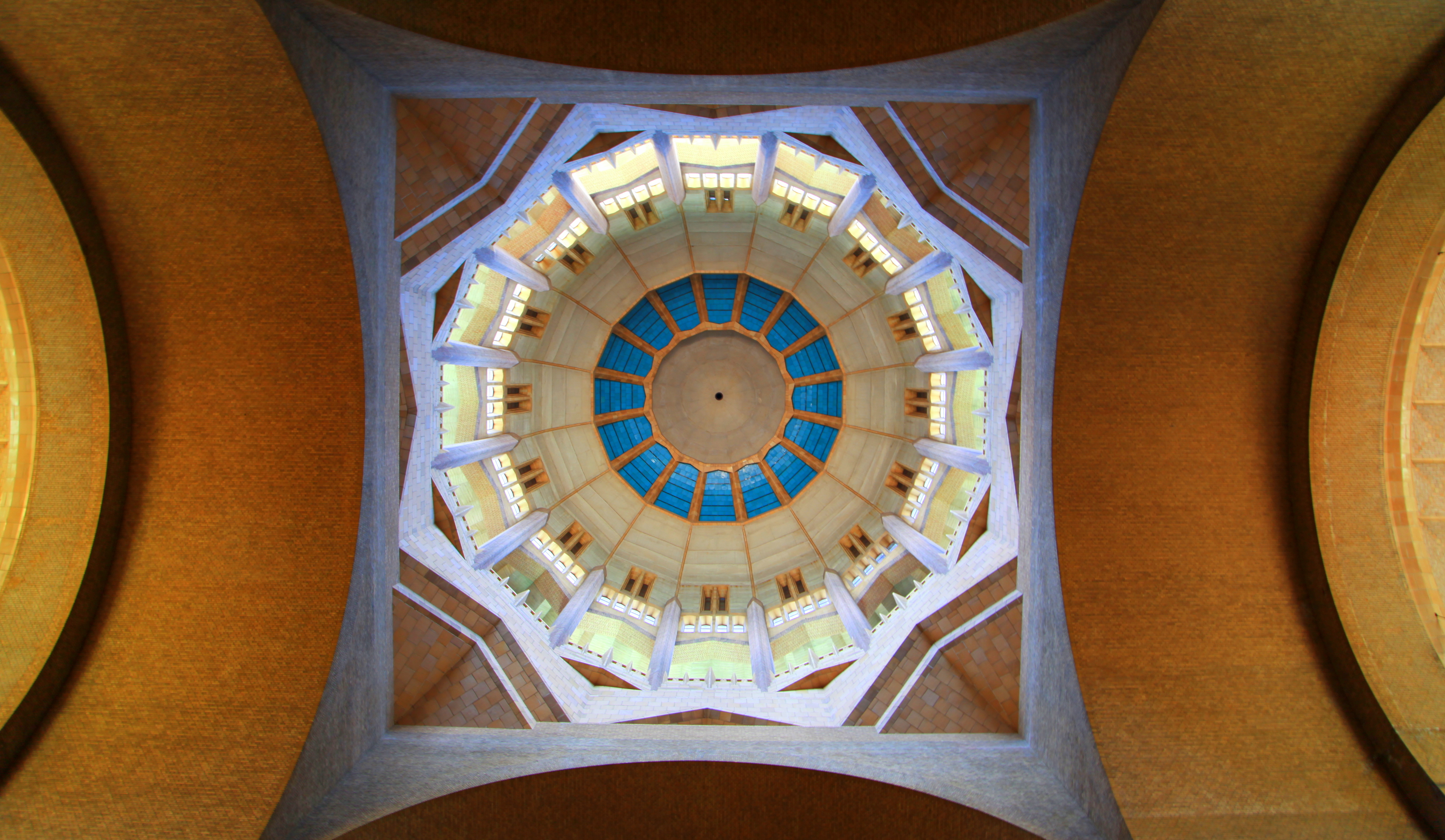
Inside view of the dome

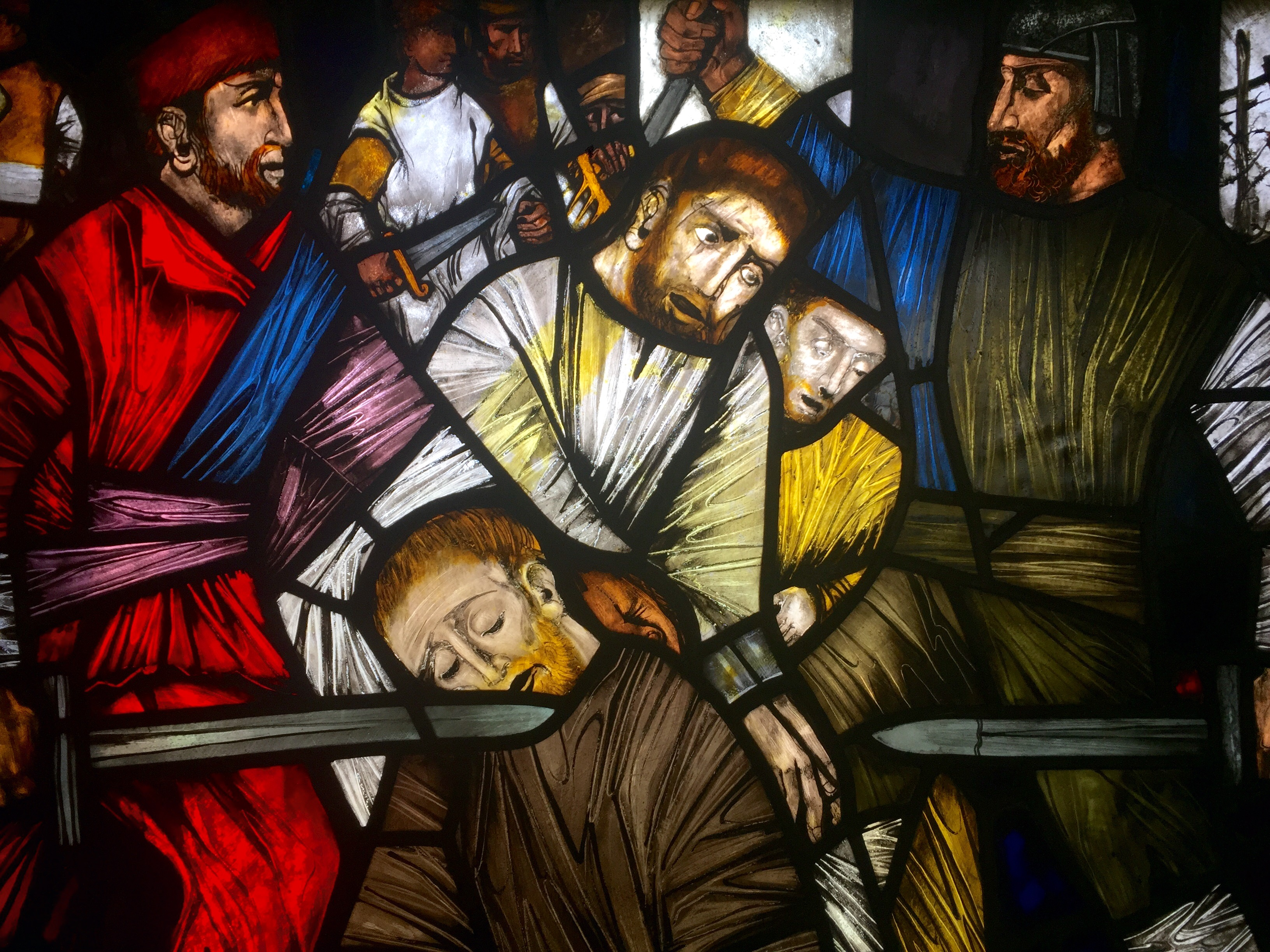
Stained glass

== Panoramic view ==
The basilica, on the Koekelberg Plateau, is a landmark on the Brussels skyline. The cupola's platform offers a panoramic view of Brussels and the wider province of Flemish Brabant. Visitors can reach the platform either by stairs or by two lifts commissioned in the spring of 2012, in the form of a cage and two fully glazed cabins.

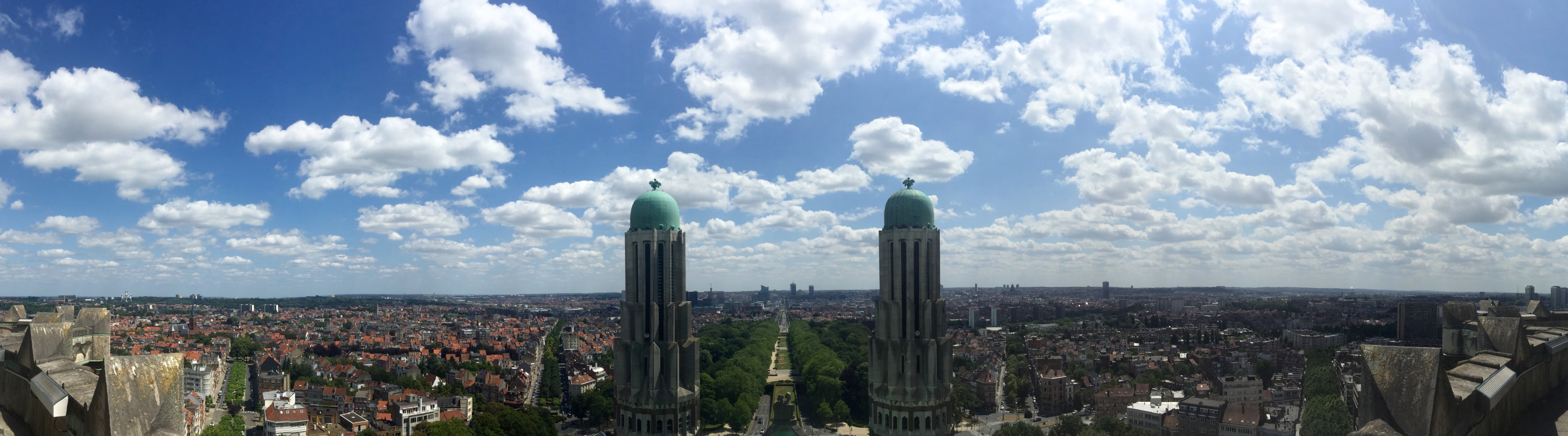
Panoramic view from atop the Koekelberg Basilica

== See also ==
- List of churches in Brussels
- List of basilicas
- List of tallest domes
- Catholic Church in Belgium
- Art Deco in Brussels
- History of Brussels
- Culture of Belgium
- Belgium in the long nineteenth century
