= List of largest church buildings =

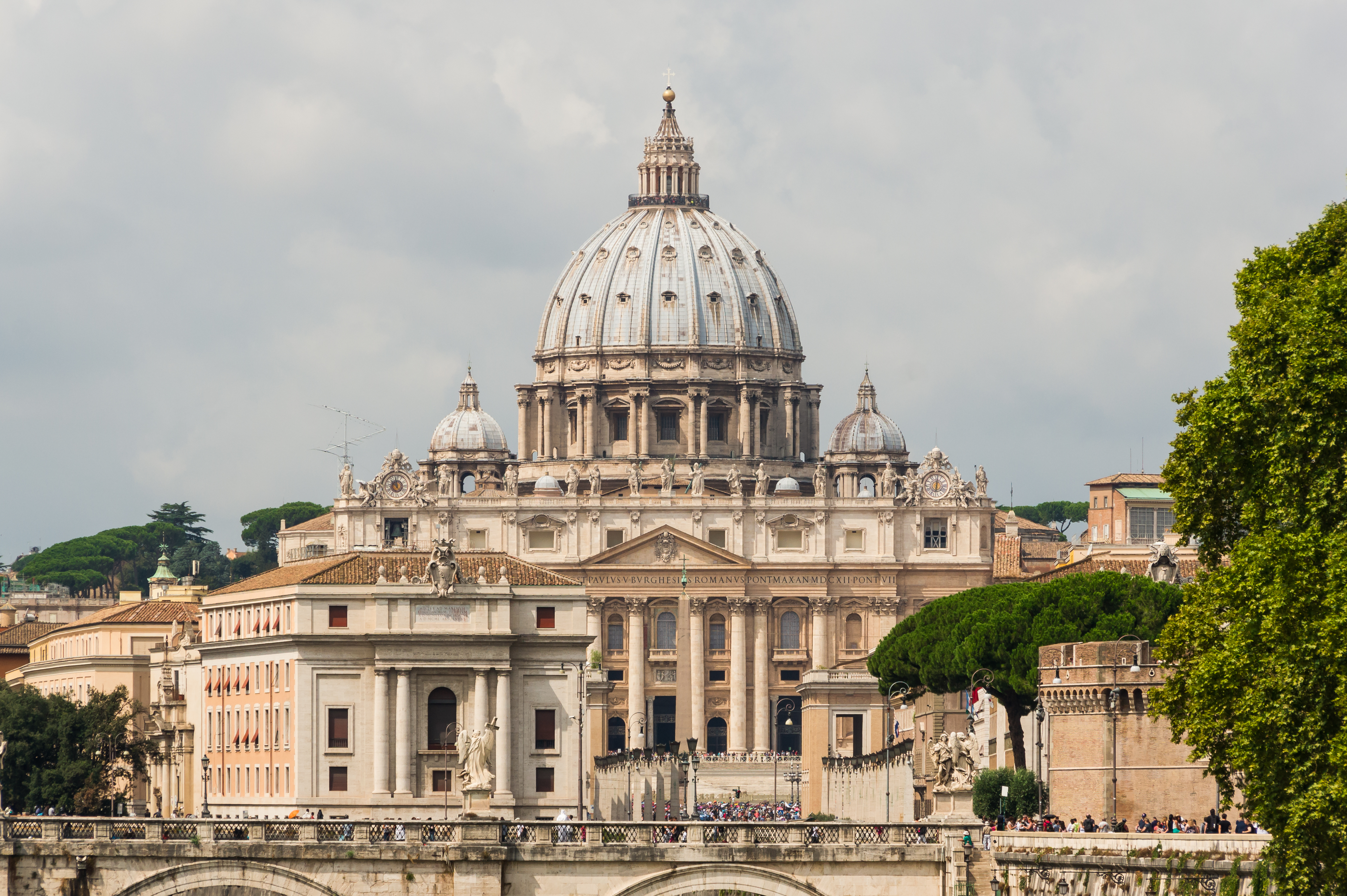
St. Peter's Basilica in Rome is the largest church in the world.

Churches can be measured and compared in several ways. These include area, volume, length, width, height, and seating capacity. Several churches individually claim to be "the largest church", which may be due to any one of these criteria. This article provides a table of large churches that can be re-sorted (and automatically re-ranked) according to each criterion, by clicking on the column headings.

== Criteria for inclusion ==
- The building was originally constructed for the purpose of holding Christian religious services (see Church (building) for more detail), and was not built as a shrine, tabernacle, temple, or for any other function different from that of a church.
  - Entries are included even if they currently do not function as a church. For example, the Hagia Sophia is included; it was originally built as a church but currently operates as a mosque. (Note: The Hagia Sophia was constructed in 360 and operated as a church until 1453 when it was converted into a mosque. In 1935 the Hagia Sophia was reconstituted as a museum open to the public. After this decision was annulled in 2020, the status of the Hagia Sophia reverted to that of a mosque.)
  - Buildings that were not originally constructed as churches are generally not included; for example, the Lakewood Church building, which was built as The Summit. An exception is made for buildings that have been substantially modified for use as a church; for example, the Mosque–Cathedral of Córdoba.
- The building must still be standing.
- The building's internal floor area is known to be more than 2,000 square metres (22,000 sq ft).
  - Internal floor area is measured to the internal face of the external walls.
  - External floor area is measured to the external face of the external walls.
  - A reliable source is present that states the building's area.

== List ==
Church measurements have often been reported in ways that are vague or inconsistent, and the accuracy of the list is limited by the availability of reliable published data that is consistent with the criteria used in this article.

Converted buildings included due to substantial transformation into churches

Name	Area (m^{2})		Gross volume (m^{3})	Capacity	Built	City	Country	Denomination	Notes
Name	Interior	Exterior	Gross volume (m^{3})	Capacity	Built	City	Country	Denomination	Notes
St. Peter's Basilica	25,616	76,800	1,600,000	60,000 standing, or 20,000 seated	1506–1626	Rome	Vatican City	Catholic (Latin)	Largest church in the world.
Cathedral Basilica of Our Lady Aparecida	25,000	142,865	1,200,000	45,000 standing, 30,000 seated	1955–1980	Aparecida	Brazil	Catholic (Latin)	Largest cathedral in the world.
Mosque–Cathedral of Córdoba	13,000	23,400 (Note: The external floor area also includes the courtyards.)		40,000 standing	785–1607	Córdoba	Spain	Catholic (Latin)	Much of its original mosque architecture has been preserved, and it serves as the Catholic cathedral of the Diocese of Córdoba.
Seville Cathedral	11,520+ (Note: The measurement does not include non-public areas such as private cloisters, offices, and storage rooms. It also excludes other buildings that are part of the Cathedral, such as La Giralda, which is the Cathedral’s bell tower, as well as exterior spaces within the Cathedral complex, like the Patio de los Naranjos (Orange Tree Courtyard) and other courtyards.)	23,500	205,524	80,000 standing, or 20,000 seated	1401–1528	Seville	Spain	Catholic (Latin)	Largest Gothic church by total exterior area and the largest gothic cathedral. The site was originally occupied by a Visigothic church, which was destroyed by the Arabs in 712. A mosque was built between 1172-1198 and demolished in 1401.
Milan Cathedral	11,700	12,000	440,000	40,000	1386–1965	Milan	Italy	Catholic (Latin)	
Cathedral of St. John the Divine	11,241		480,000	8,600	1892–present	New York City	United States	Anglican (Episcopal Church in the U.S.)	Unfinished.
Basilica of Our Lady of Licheń	23,000		300,000	7,000	1994–2004	Licheń Stary	Poland	Catholic (Latin)	
Liverpool Cathedral	9,687		450,000	3,500	1904–1978	Liverpool	United Kingdom	Anglican (Church of England)	Longest cathedral in the world.
Basilica of the Holy Trinity	8,700		130,000	9,000	2004–2007	Fátima	Portugal	Catholic (Latin)	Area given as 12,000 m^{2}
Basilica of Saint Paul Outside the Walls	8,515				320-420; rebuilt 1825–1929	Rome	Italy	Catholic (Latin)	
People's Salvation Cathedral	8,400	13,668.55	478,857	7,000	2010–2025 (estimated); Consecrated 2018.	Bucharest	Romania	Eastern Orthodox (Romanian)	Tallest and largest (by volume) Orthodox church building in the world.
Cathedral Basilica of Our Lady of the Pillar	8,318				1681–1872	Saragossa	Spain	Catholic (Latin)	
Florence Cathedral	8,300				1296–1436	Florence	Italy	Catholic (Latin)	
Basilica of Our Lady of Guadalupe	8,167			10,000	1974–1976	Mexico City	Mexico	Catholic (Latin)	Circular base of 102 m in diameter
Cathedral of Our Lady	8,000				1352–1521	Antwerp	Belgium	Catholic (Latin)	
Rio de Janeiro Cathedral	8,000			20,000 standing, 5,000 seated	1964–1976	Rio de Janeiro	Brazil	Catholic (Latin)	
Basilica of the Sacred Heart	8,000				1905–1970	Koekelberg (Brussels)	Belgium	Catholic (Latin)	
Basilica of Our Lady of Peace	7,989	30,000		18,000	1985–1989	Yamoussoukro	Ivory Coast	Catholic (Latin)	Largest Catholic church by exterior area. Exterior area includes rectory and a villa.
Hagia Sophia	7,960		255,800		532–537	Istanbul	Turkey	Eastern Orthodox (Greek)	Byzantine church constructed in 537; converted to a mosque.
San Petronio Basilica	7,920		258,000	28,000	1390–1479	Bologna	Italy	Catholic (Latin)	
Cologne Cathedral	7,914		407,000		1248–1880	Cologne	Germany	Catholic (Latin)	
St Paul's Cathedral	7,875				1677–1708	London	United Kingdom	Anglican (Church of England)	
Washington National Cathedral	7,712				1907–1990	Washington, D.C.	United States	Anglican (Episcopal Church in the U.S.)	
Amiens Cathedral	7,700		200,000 (interior only)		1220–1270	Amiens	France	Catholic (Latin)	Gross volume slightly below 400,000
Abbey of Santa Giustina	7,700				1501–1606	Padua	Italy	Catholic (Latin)	
Cathedral of the Nativity	7,500		135,000	8,200	2017–2019	Cairo	Egypt	Oriental Orthodox (Coptic)	Largest Oriental Orthodox church in the world
Yoido Full Gospel	7,450 (estimated)	44,000		12,000	1973	Seoul	South Korea	Protestant (Pentecostal)	Largest Pentecostal church
St. Vitus Cathedral	7,440				1344–1929	Prague	Czech Republic	Catholic (Latin)	
Basilica of the Immaculate Conception	7,097	10,234		10,000	1920–2017	Washington, D.C.	United States	Catholic (Latin)	Interior area only for the upper church / upper floor.
Cathedral of La Plata	6,968				1884–1932	La Plata	Argentina	Catholic (Latin)	Largest church in Argentina
Saint Joseph's Oratory	6,825				1904–1967	Montreal	Canada	Catholic (Latin)	The largest church in Canada
Mexico City Metropolitan Cathedral	6,732				1573–1813	Mexico City	Mexico	Catholic (Latin)	
Chartres Cathedral	6,700	10,875			1145–1220	Chartres	France	Catholic (Latin)	
Berlin Cathedral	6,270			2,000+	1451–1905	Berlin	Germany	Protestant (Lutheran)	116 meters high & 73 meters wide.
Cathedral of Saint Paul (Minnesota)		6,200 (estimated)			1906–1915	St Paul	United States	Catholic (Latin)	
Cathedral of Our Lady of the Angels	6,038				1998–2002	Los Angeles	United States	Catholic (Latin)	
De Hoeksteen	6,020		43,300	2,531	2007–2008	Barneveld	Netherlands	Protestant (Calvinist)	
Padre Pio Pilgrimage Church	6,000			6,500	1991–2004	San Giovanni Rotondo	Italy	Catholic (Latin)	Vaulted church holding 6,500 seats
Ulm Minster	5,950		190,000	2,000	1377–1890	Ulm	Germany	Protestant (Lutheran)	Tallest church in the world
York Minster	5,927				1230–1472	York	United Kingdom	Anglican (Church of England)	Largest Gothic cathedral in Northern Europe.
Bourges Cathedral	5,900	6,200			1195–1230	Bourges	France	Catholic (Latin)	
Reims Cathedral	5,800	6,650			1211–1275	Reims	France	Catholic (Latin)	The longest church in France at 149.17m
São Paulo Cathedral	5,700			8,000	1913–1954	São Paulo	Brazil	Catholic (Latin)	
Esztergom Basilica	5,660				1822–1869	Esztergom	Hungary	Catholic (Latin)	
Diocesan Sanctuary of Our Lady of Guadalupe	5,414.58				1898–2008	Zamora	Mexico	Catholic (Latin)	Co-cathedral church of the diocese of Zamora.
Basilica de la Sagrada Familia	5,400			9,000	1882–present	Barcelona	Spain	Catholic (Latin)	Unfinished; expected complete sometime after 2026.
Strasbourg Cathedral	5,300	6,044			1015–1439	Strasbourg	France	Catholic (Latin)	World's tallest building from 1647 to 1874
Primate Cathedral of Bogotá	5,300				1807–1823	Bogotá	Colombia	Catholic (Latin)	Largest church in Colombia
Palma Cathedral	5,200		160,000 (interior)		1220–1346	Palma	Spain	Catholic (Latin)	
New Cathedral, Linz	5,170			20,000	1862–1924	Linz	Austria	Catholic (Latin)	
Speyer Cathedral	5,038				1030–1103	Speyer	Germany	Catholic (Latin)	Added to the UNESCO World Heritage List
Metropolitan Cathedral of Lima	5,020				1535–1797	Lima	Peru	Catholic (Latin)	Largest church in Peru
Westminster Cathedral	5,017			2,000	1895–1910	London	United Kingdom	Catholic (Latin)	Largest Roman Catholic Church in the UK.
Medak Cathedral	5,000				1914–1926	Medak	India	Protestant (Church of South India)	
Basilica of Our Lady of Good Health	5,574			10,000 seated	2013	Velankanni, Tamil Nadu	India	Catholic (Latin)	The church has been built without pillars. It is ranked among the largest Christian worship places in Asia.
Lincoln Cathedral	5,000 (estimated)				1185–1311	Lincoln	United Kingdom	Anglican (Church of England)	
St. Mary's Church	5,000		155,000		1343–1502	Gdańsk	Poland	Catholic (Latin)	Largest brick church in the world
Holy Trinity Cathedral	5,000		137,000		1995–2004	Tbilisi	Georgia	Eastern Orthodox (Georgian)	
Winchester Cathedral	4,968				1079–1525	Winchester	United Kingdom	Anglican (Church of England)	The longest Gothic cathedral in Europe
Basílica del Voto Nacional	4,900	8,000	170,000	6,000 standing, 2,000 seated (estimate)	1892-1988 (consecrated)	Quito	Ecuador	Catholic (Latin)	Largest Gothic Church in the Americas. Some internal details still unfinished.
Canterbury Cathedral	4,900 (estimated)			2,000	1070-1495	Canterbury	United Kingdom	Anglican (Church of England)	Mother Church of the Anglican Communion.
Notre-Dame de Paris	4,800	5,500	100,000	9,000	1163–1345; 2019–present (reconstruction)	Paris	France	Catholic (Latin)	
Almudena Cathedral	4,800				1883–1993	Madrid	Spain	Catholic (Latin)	It has a north–south orientation instead of east–west.
Dresden Cathedral	4,800				1739–1755	Dresden	Germany	Catholic (Latin)	Largest church in all of Saxony
Durham Cathedral	4,760 (estimated)				1093-1133	Durham	United Kingdom	Anglican (Church of England)	Largest and finest example of Norman architecture in England.
Turku Cathedral	4,745	10,429		900	1300–1773	Turku	Finland	Protestant (Lutheran)	
Peterborough Cathedral	4,660 (estimated)				1118-1237	Peterborough	United Kingdom	Anglican (Church of England)	Unique painted wooden nave ceiling, one of only four in Europe.
Basilica Cathedral of Arequipa	4,608				1540–1656	Arequipa	Peru	Catholic (Latin)	
Salisbury Cathedral	4,510 (estimated)				1220-1258	Salisbury	United Kingdom	Anglican (Church of England)	Origin of the Sarum Rite; Tallest spire in UK (123 m).
Santiago Metropolitan Cathedral	4,500				1748–1906	Santiago de Chile	Chile	Catholic (Latin)	
Basilica of St. Thérèse, Lisieux	4,500				1929–1954	Lisieux	France	Catholic (Latin)	
Lübeck Cathedral	4,470 (estimated)				1173-1335	Lübeck	Germany	Protestant (Lutheran)	Part of Lübeck UNESCO World Heritage Site.
Basilica de San Martin de Tours (Taal)	4,320				1856–1878	Taal, Batangas	Philippines	Catholic (Latin)	Largest Catholic church in Asia
Ely Cathedral	4,273				1083–1375	Ely	United Kingdom	Anglican (Church of England)	
St Albans Cathedral	4,200 (estimated)				1077–1893	St Albans	United Kingdom	Anglican (Church of England)	Oldest site of continuous Christian worship in Britain.
Frauenkirche	4,188		185,000–190,000		1468–1525	Munich	Germany	Catholic (Latin)	
Cathedral Basilica of the Sacred Heart	4,181			2,000	1898–1954	Newark, New Jersey	United States	Catholic (Latin)	
Se Cathedral	4,180				1619–1640	Goa, India	India	Catholic (Latin)	
St. Stephen's Basilica	4,147				1851–1906	Budapest	Hungary	Catholic (Latin)	
Cathedral Basilica of Saint Louis (St. Louis)	4,130				1907–1914	St. Louis	United States	Catholic (Latin)	Mosaics 7,700 square meters
Magdeburg Cathedral	4,020 (estimated)				1209-1520	Magdeburg	Germany	Protestant (Lutheran)	Oldest Gothic cathedral in Germany.
Saint Isaac's Cathedral	4,000 +	7,000	260,000		1818–1858	Saint Petersburg	Russia	Eastern Orthodox (Russian)	Built as a cathedral, now a museum
Cathedral of Christ the Saviour	3,980	6,829.3	101,992	9,500	1839–1883	Moscow	Russia	Eastern Orthodox (Russian)	Rebuilt from 1995 to 2000
Briarwood Presbyterian Church	3,960 (estimated)				1960	Birmingham	United States	Protestant (Calvinist - Presbyterian)	
Saint Gregory the Illuminator Cathedral, Yerevan	3,822				1997–2001	Yerevan	Armenia	Oriental Orthodox (Armenian)	
Holy Name of Jesus Cathedral	3,820				2015–2018	Raleigh	United States	Catholic (Latin)	
Catedral Evangelica de Chile or Jotabeche Cathedral	3,714.91			7,000	1967–1974	Santiago de Chile	Chile	Protestant (Pentecostal)	Largest capacity in Chile; national historic monument since 2013.
Bremen Cathedral	3,660 (estimated)				1220	Bremen	Germany	Protestant (Lutheran)	
Church of Saint Sava	3,650	4,830	170,000		1935–2020	Belgrade	Serbia	Eastern Orthodox (Serbian)	
Blessed Stanley Rother Shrine	3,512			1,859	2021–2022	Oklahoma City	United States	Catholic (Latin)	
Nieuwe Kerk (Amsterdam)	3,500				1385	Amsterdam	Netherlands	Protestant (Calvinist)	Second oldest parish church in Amsterdam.
Worcester Cathedral	3,480 (estimated)				1084–1504	Worcester	United Kingdom	Anglican (Church of England)	
Uppsala Cathedral	3,439	4,077	50,000 excluding towers	2,200	1273-1435	Uppsala	Sweden	Church of Sweden (Lutheran)	Largest Cathedral in northern Europe. Height 118,7m, Length 118,95 m.
Yeonmudae Catholic Church	3,360				2008–2009	Korea Army Training Center	South Korea	Catholic (Latin)	The largest church in East Asia
Grace Cathedral	3,357				1910–1964	San Francisco	United States	Anglican (Episcopal Church in the U.S.)	
Oude Kerk (Amsterdam)	3,300				1213 –1306	Amsterdam	Netherlands	Protestant (Calvinist)	Oldest parish church in Amsterdam.
Norwich Cathedral	3,300 (estimated)				1096–(1121 or 1145)	Norwich	United Kingdom	Anglican (Church of England)	Longest cloister in England after Salisbury.
Wells Cathedral	3,280 (estimated)				1176 – c. 1490	Wells	United Kingdom	Anglican (Church of England)	First entirely Gothic English cathedral.
Strängnäs Cathedral	3,270 (estimated)				1260	Strängnäs	Sweden	Church of Sweden (Lutheran)	
Basilica of Saints Peter and Paul (Lewiston, Maine)	3,264			2,200	1906–1936	Lewiston	United States	Catholic (Latin)	Largest church in the State of Maine, still serves mass in French.
Alexander Nevsky Cathedral	3,170		86,000	5,000	1882–1912	Sofia	Bulgaria	Eastern Orthodox (Bulgaria)	Largest church in Bulgaria and largest cathedral in the Balkan Peninsula.
Chester Cathedral	3,170 (estimated)				1093-c. 15 cent.	Chester	United Kingdom	Anglican (Church of England)	Largest medieval church in Cheshire.
Schwerin Cathedral	3,160 (estimated)				1172-1248	Schwerin	Germany	Protestant (Lutheran)	Tallest church tower in Mecklenburg-Vorpommern.
St. Charles Borromeo (Visalia)	3,159			3,148 seated	2011–2023	Visalia	United States	Catholic (Latin)	Largest Catholic parish church in North America.
Linköping Cathedral	3,140 (estimated)				1230	Linköping	Sweden	Church of Sweden (Lutheran)	
Gloucester Cathedral	3,120 (estimated)				1089-1482	Gloucester	United Kingdom	Anglican (Church of England)	
Immaculata Church	3,084			1,580	2020-2023	St. Marys	United States	Catholic (Latin)	The largest SSPX Catholic church in the world
Roskilde Cathedral	3,080 (estimated)				1170–1636	Roskilde	Denmark	Church of Denmark (Lutheran)	Burial place of 40 Danish monarchs.
Riga Cathedral	3,050 (estimated)				1211	Riga	Latvia	Protestant (Lutheran)	Largest medieval church in Baltics.
Västerås Cathedral	3,050 (estimated)			1,100	1271	Västerås	Sweden	Church of Sweden (Lutheran)	
Lichfield Cathedral	3,040 (estimated)				1210–1330	Lichfield	United Kingdom	Anglican (Church of England)	
Christ Cathedral	3,030				1977–1980	Garden Grove	United States	Catholic (Latin)	Formerly known as the Crystal Cathedral. Consecrated as the Christ Cathedral
Aarhus Cathedral	3,010 (estimated)				1190–1500	Aarhus	Denmark	Church of Denmark (Lutheran)	Longest and tallest church in Denmark.
Chichester Cathedral	2,980 (estimated)				1075	Chichester	United Kingdom	Anglican (Church of England)	
Westminster Abbey	2,972			2,200	960–c. 18 cent.	London	United Kingdom	Anglican (Church of England)	
Tewkesbury Abbey	2,910 (estimated)				1102 –1121	Tewkesbury	United Kingdom	Anglican (Church of England)	Considered one of the finest examples of Norman architecture in Britain, it has "probably the largest and finest Romanesque" crossing tower in England.
Sümi Baptist Church, Zünheboto	2,885			8,500	2007–2017	Zunheboto, Nagaland	India	Protestant (Baptist)	
Bern Minster	2,835				1421–1893	Bern	Switzerland	Protestant (Calvinist)	Tallest church in Switzerland.
St. Lorenz, Nuremberg	2,810 (estimated)				1250-1477	Nuremberg	Germany	Protestant (Lutheran)	
Guildford Cathedral	2,750 (estimated)				1936-1961	Guildford	United Kingdom	Anglican (Church of England)	
Church of Our Lady, Copenhagen	2,700 (estimated)				1817-1829	Copenhagen	Denmark	Church of Denmark (Lutheran)	
Grote Kerk (Breda)	2,700 (estimated)				1410-1547	Breda	Netherlands	Protestant (Calvinist)	The most important monument and a landmark of Breda
St. Michael's Church, Hamburg	2,700 (estimated)				1647-1669	Hamburg	Germany	Protestant (Lutheran)	
Methodist Central Hall, Westminster	2,700 (estimated)	2,700 (estimated)			1905-1911	London	United Kingdom	Protestant (Methodist)	Largest Methodist church building in England and used formerly as the headquarters of the Methodist Church of Great Britain until 2000
Ripon Cathedral	2,680 (estimated)				1160–1547	Ripon	United Kingdom	Anglican (Church of England)	
St Patrick's Cathedral, Melbourne	2,621				1858-1939	Melbourne	Australia	Catholic (Latin)	
Beverley Minster	2,620 (estimated)				1188–1420	Beverley	United Kingdom	Anglican (Church of England)	It is one of the largest parish churches in the UK, larger than one-third of all English cathedrals and is regarded as a Gothic masterpiece.
Exeter Cathedral	2,610				1112–1400	Exeter	United Kingdom	Anglican (Church of England)	
St Andrew's Cathedral, Patras	2,600				1908–1974	Patras	Greece	Eastern Orthodox (Greek)	1,900 m^{2} on the ground floor and additionally 700 m^{2} on the first level (used as a gynaeconitis)
St Mary's Cathedral, Sydney	2,600				1868–2000	Sydney	Australia	Catholic (Latin)	
Nidaros Cathedral	2,600 (estimated)				1070-1320	Nidaros	Norway	Church of Norway (Lutheran)	
Hereford Cathedral	2,580 (estimated)				1079-c.1250	Hereford	United Kingdom	Anglican (Church of England)	
Great Yarmouth Minster	2,580 (estimated)				1101-1119	Great Yarmouth	United Kingdom	Anglican (Church of England)	one of the largest parish churches in England
St Patrick's Cathedral, Dublin	2,520 (estimated)				1191-1260	Dublin	Ireland	Anglican (Church of Ireland)	the national cathedral of the Church of Ireland
St. Patrick's Cathedral (New York City)	2,500			2,400	1858–1878	New York City	United States	Catholic (Latin)	
Truro Cathedral	2,480 (estimated)				1880–1910	Truro	United Kingdom	Anglican (Church of England)	
Schleswig Cathedral	2,470				1134-c. 1200	Schleswig (city)	Germany	Protestant (Lutheran)	
Beomeo Cathedral	2,463				2013–2016	Daegu	South Korea	Catholic (Latin)	
Buurkerk	2,430 (estimated)				1279 - 1553	Utrecht	Netherlands	Protestant (Calvinist)	
Helsinki Cathedral	2,400			1,300	1869–1887	Helsinki	Finland	Protestant (Lutheran)	
Basel Minster	2,400				1019–1500	Basel	Switzerland	Protestant (Calvinist)	
Lausanne Cathedral	2,390				1170–1235	Lausanne	Switzerland	Protestant (Calvinist)	
Lund Cathedral	2,330 (estimated)				1080/1090-1145	Lund	Sweden	Church of Sweden (Lutheran)	
Cathedral Basilica of St. Francis of Assisi (Santa Fe)	2,322				1869–1887	Santa Fe	United States	Catholic (Latin)	
St Anne's Cathedral, Belfast	2,310 (estimated)				1899-1904	Belfast	United Kingdom	Anglican (Church of Ireland)	
Basilica of Our Lady of Dolours, Thrissur	2,300				1929–2005	Thrissur	India	Catholic (Syro-Malabar)	It has the third tallest tower in Asia
Coventry Cathedral	2,290 (estimated)				1956–1962	Coventry	United Kingdom	Anglican (Church of England)	
St. John's Church, Seongnam	2,260				1994–2002	Seongnam	South Korea	Catholic (Latin)	Until 2009, largest church in East Asia
Martinikerk (Groningen)	2,240 (estimated)				1300	Groningen	Netherlands	Protestant (Calvinist)	
Hull Minster	2,220 (estimated)				c. 1285	Kingston upon Hull	United Kingdom	Anglican (Church of England)	Hull Minster is one of the largest parish church in England by floor area, and contains what is widely acknowledged to be some of the finest medieval brick, reflecting the historic wealth of the port of Hull.
Romsey Abbey	2,210 (estimated)				907	Romsey	United Kingdom	Anglican (Church of England)	largest parish church in Hampshire, England, and a premier example of Norman architecture.
Rochester Cathedral	2,200 (estimated)				1079–1238	Rochester	United Kingdom	Anglican (Church of England)	Cathedral of the second oldest bishopric in England after that of the Archbishop of Canterbury.
Sacred Heart Cathedral	2,191	3,350		4,000 +	1897-1977	Bendigo	Australia	Catholic (Latin)	One of Australia's largest churches and the third tallest after St Patrick's Cathedral and St Paul's Cathedral. 75 metres (246 ft) long and has a ceiling height of 24 metres (79 ft). The main spire is 87 metres (285 ft) high.
Selby Abbey	2,185 (estimated)				1069–1465	Selby	United Kingdom	Anglican (Church of England)	one of the largest surviving medieval abbey churches in Britain.
Christchurch Priory	2,180 (estimated)				1094	Christchurch	United Kingdom	Anglican (Church of England)	Parish church known for its immense length (approx. 94 meters or 310 feet), making it one of the longest parish churches in the country.
Basilica of St. John the Baptist	2,135		64,040		1839–1855	St. John's	Canada	Catholic (Latin)	
St. Joseph Cathedral	2,125				1941	San Diego	United States	Catholic (Latin)	
St Davids Cathedral	2,120 (estimated)				1181-1131	St Davids	United Kingdom	Anglican (Church in Wales)	It is a Church in Wales cathedral situated in St Davids, Britain's smallest city
St. Pierre Cathedral	2,120 (estimated)			1,000	1160–1898	Geneva	Switzerland	Protestant (Calvinist)	It is closely associated with John Calvin, who preached there during his leadership of the Reformed movement.
Bristol Cathedral	2,110 (estimated)				1220–1877	Bristol	United Kingdom	Anglican (Church of England)	
Newcastle Cathedral	2,110 (estimated)				1091 – c. 1500	Newcastle upon Tyne	United Kingdom	Anglican (Church of England)	
Storkyrkan	2,100 (estimated)				1306	Stockholm	Sweden	Church of Sweden (Lutheran)	

== See also ==
- List of the largest evangelical church auditoriums
- List of Christian denominations by number of members
- List of tallest church buildings
- List of largest Eastern Orthodox church buildings
- List of tallest Eastern Orthodox church buildings
- List of tallest domes
- List of highest church naves
- Monumental crosses
