= Koekelberg =

Municipality of the Brussels-Capital Region, Belgium

- Municipality
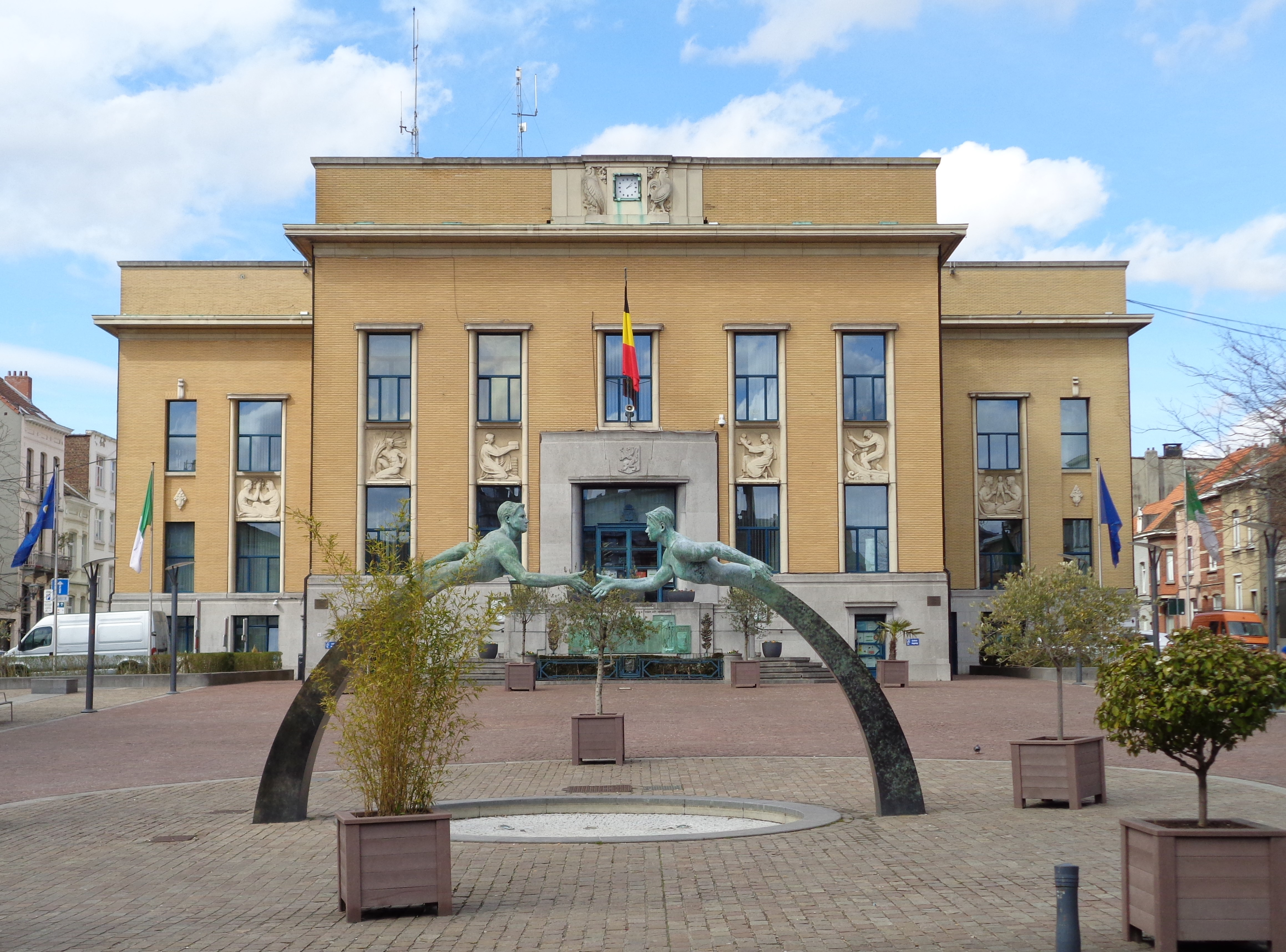
- Koekelberg's Municipal Hall seen from the Place Henri Vanhuffel/Henri Vanhuffelplein

- Flag Coat of arms

- Koekelberg municipality in the Brussels-Capital Region
- Interactive map of Koekelberg
- Location in Belgium
- Coordinates: 50°52′N 04°20′E
- Country: Belgium
- Community: Flemish Community; French Community
- Region: Brussels-Capital
- Arrondissement: Brussels-Capital

Government
  - Mayor: Olivia P'tito (PS)
  - Governing party: PS - Vooruit - Alternative humaniste

Area
  - Total: 1.18 km^{2} (0.46 sq mi)

Population (2020-01-01)
  - Total: 21,959
  - Density: 18,600/km^{2} (48,200/sq mi)
- Postal codes: 1081
- NIS code: 21011
- Area codes: 02
- Website: www.koekelberg.be

Koekelberg (French: [kukœlbɛʁ(ɡ)]; (Note: The name Koekelberg comes from Dutch, so its French pronunciation does not (exactly) match the French orthography. See also Schaerbeek.) Dutch: [ˈkukəlˌbɛr(ə)x]) is one of the 19 municipalities of the Brussels-Capital Region, Belgium. Located in the north-western part of the region, it is bordered by Berchem-Sainte-Agathe, Ganshoren, Jette, and Molenbeek-Saint-Jean. Like all municipalities in Brussels, it is officially bilingual (French–Dutch).

As of 1 January 2024, the municipality had a population of 22,648 inhabitants, the smallest in the region. The total area is 1.18 km^{2} (0.46 sq mi), which gives a population density of 19,162/km^{2} (49,630/sq mi).

The municipality is dominated by the National Basilica of the Sacred Heart (or Koekelberg Basilica), one of the largest churches in the world. Its main transportation hub are the interconnected Simonis and Elisabeth metro stations, served by the Brussels Intercommunal Transport Company (STIB/MIVB) system.

== Main sights ==
Koekelberg has a rich cultural and architectural heritage. Some of the main points of interest include:

- The National Basilica of the Sacred Heart (or Koekelberg Basilica), a minor basilica and parish church, as well as one of the largest churches by area in the world. Completed only in 1969, and combining Art Deco with neo-Byzantine elements, its cupola provides a panoramic view of Brussels and its outskirts.
- The Municipal Hall of Koekelberg, located on the Place Henri Vanhuffel/Henri Vanhuffelplein. Built in 1882, it was fitted with a geometric Art Deco facade designed by the architect Henri-Aimé Jacobs in 1938.
- The Church of St. Anne, a Catholic parish church designed in postmodern style by the architects Jean Cosse and Brigitte-Noël de Groof and built in 1989–1990.
- The Lefever House, an early 20th-century (1913) Art Nouveau town house designed by the architect Fernand Lefever.
- The buildings of the former Victoria biscuit factory, now home to the Belgian Chocolate Village, a museum dedicated to chocolate.
- Finally, the municipality maintains several green areas, including Elisabeth Park and Victoria Park.
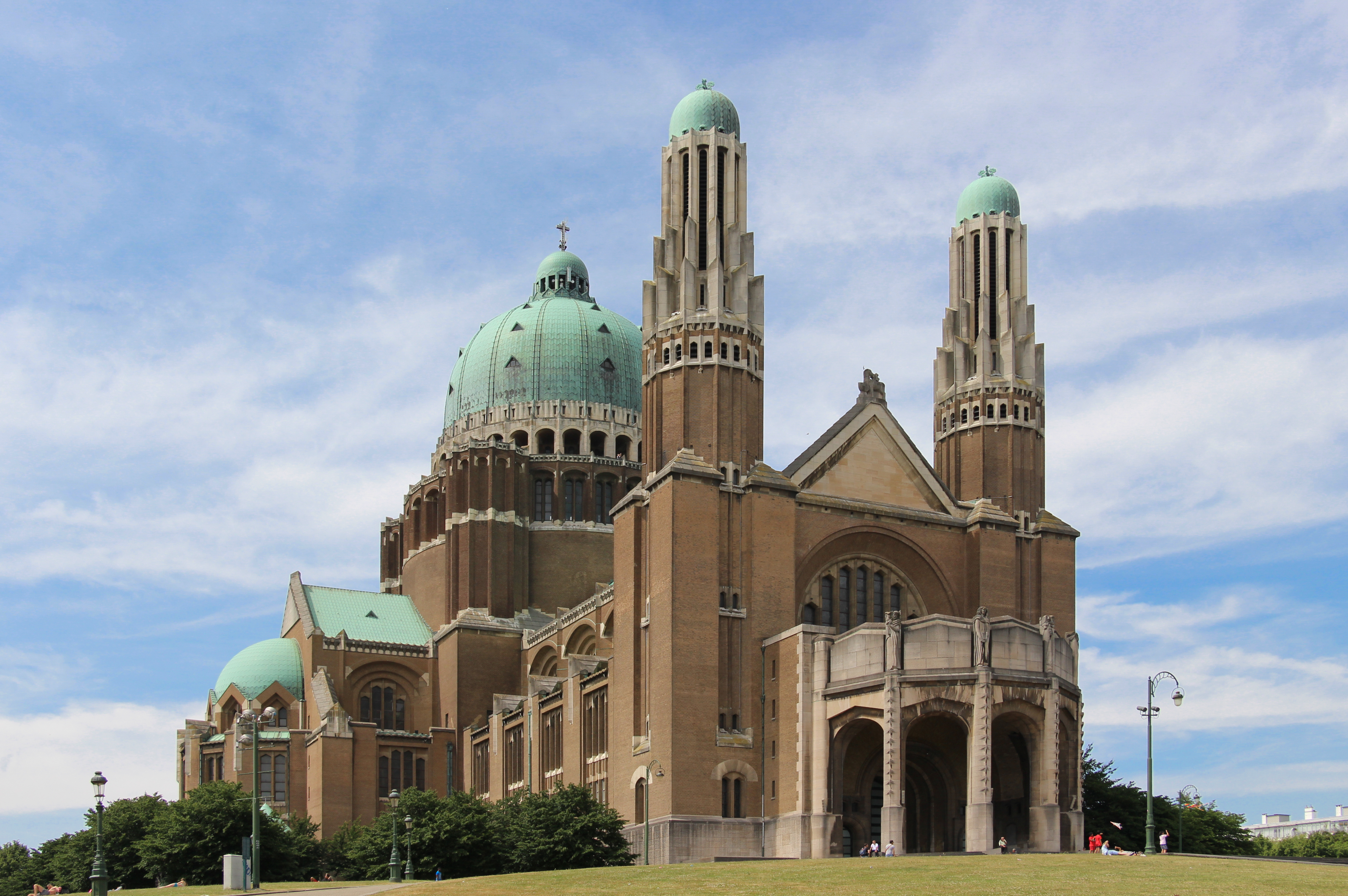
National Basilica of the Sacred Heart

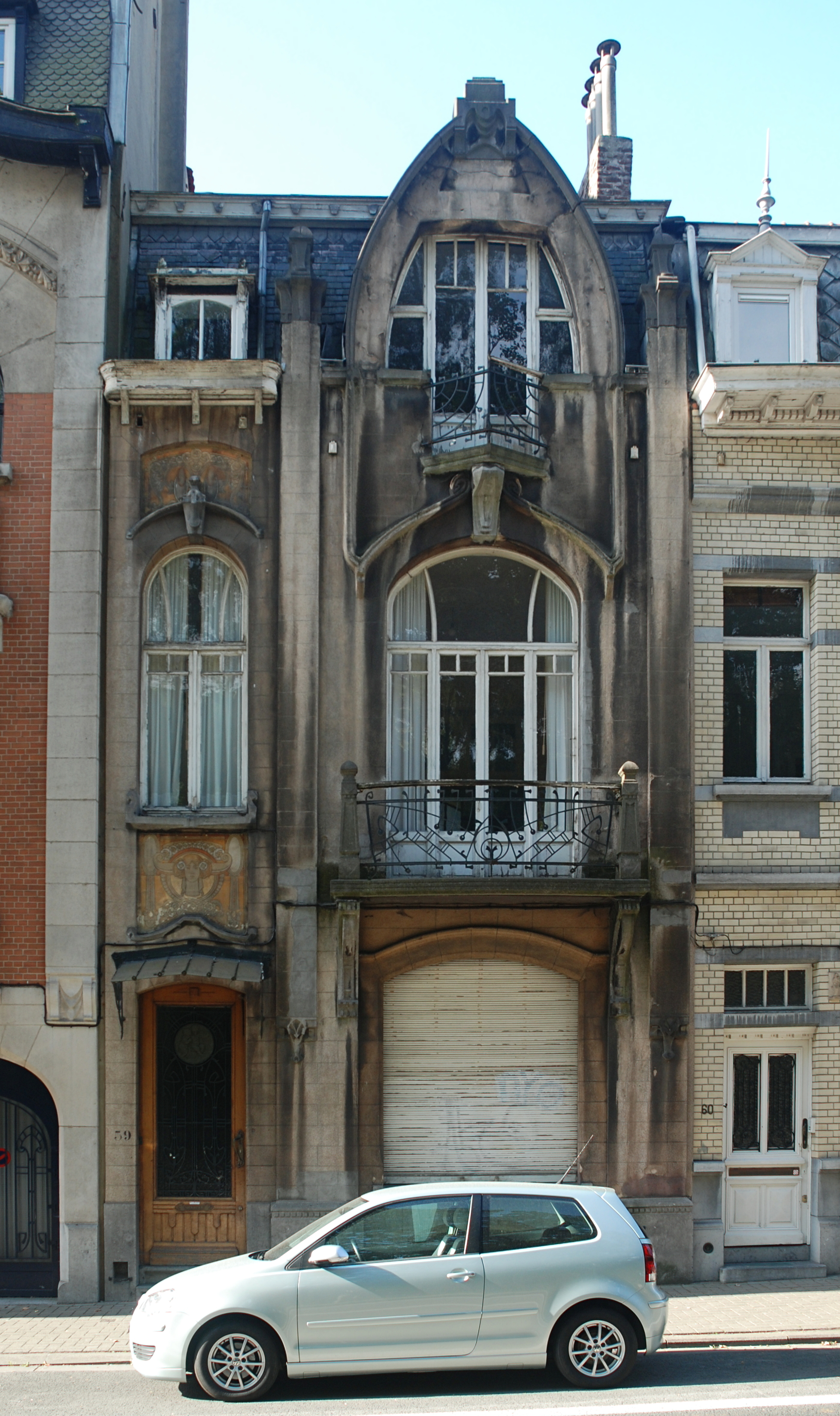
Lefever House

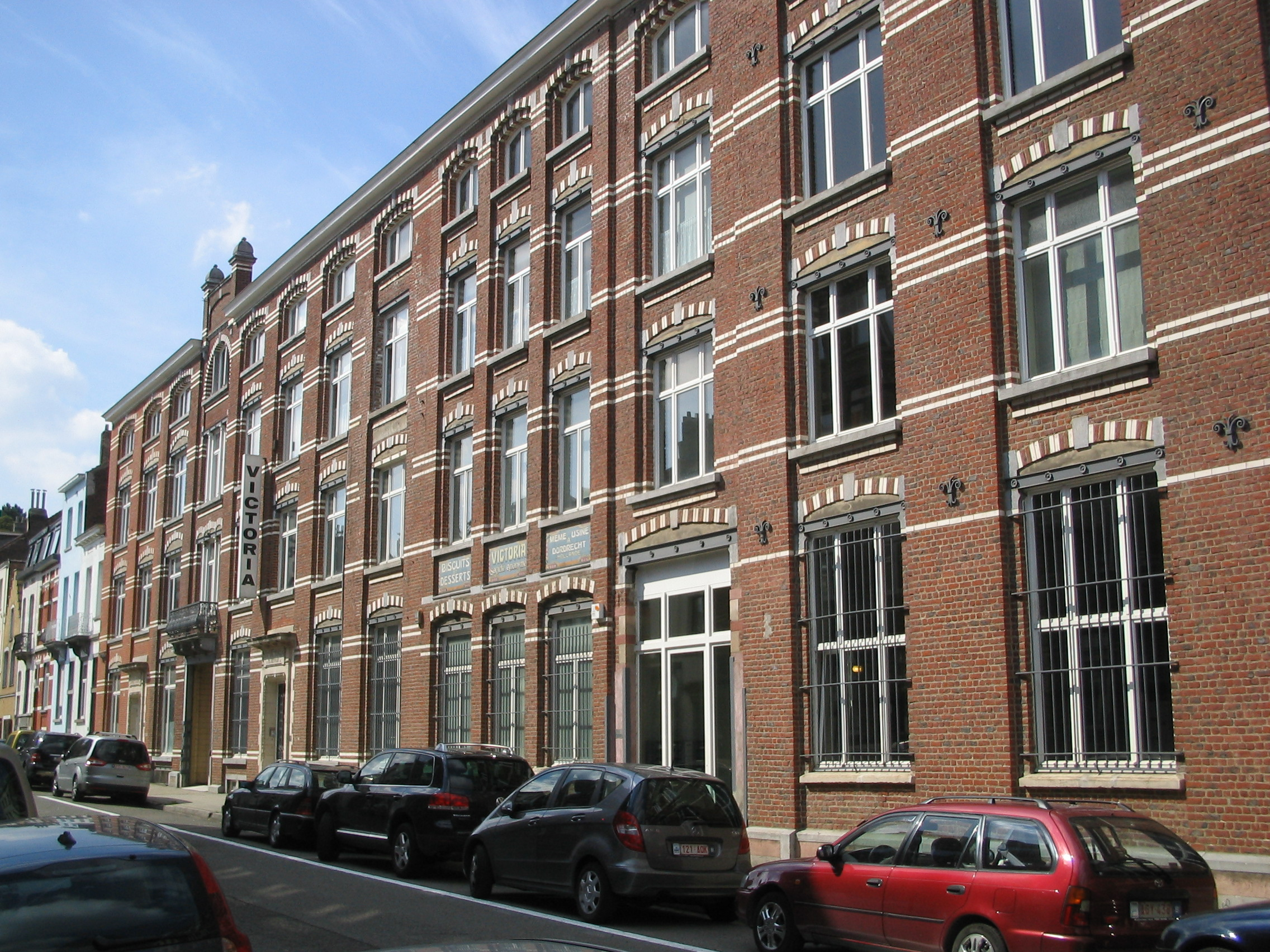
Belgian Chocolate Village

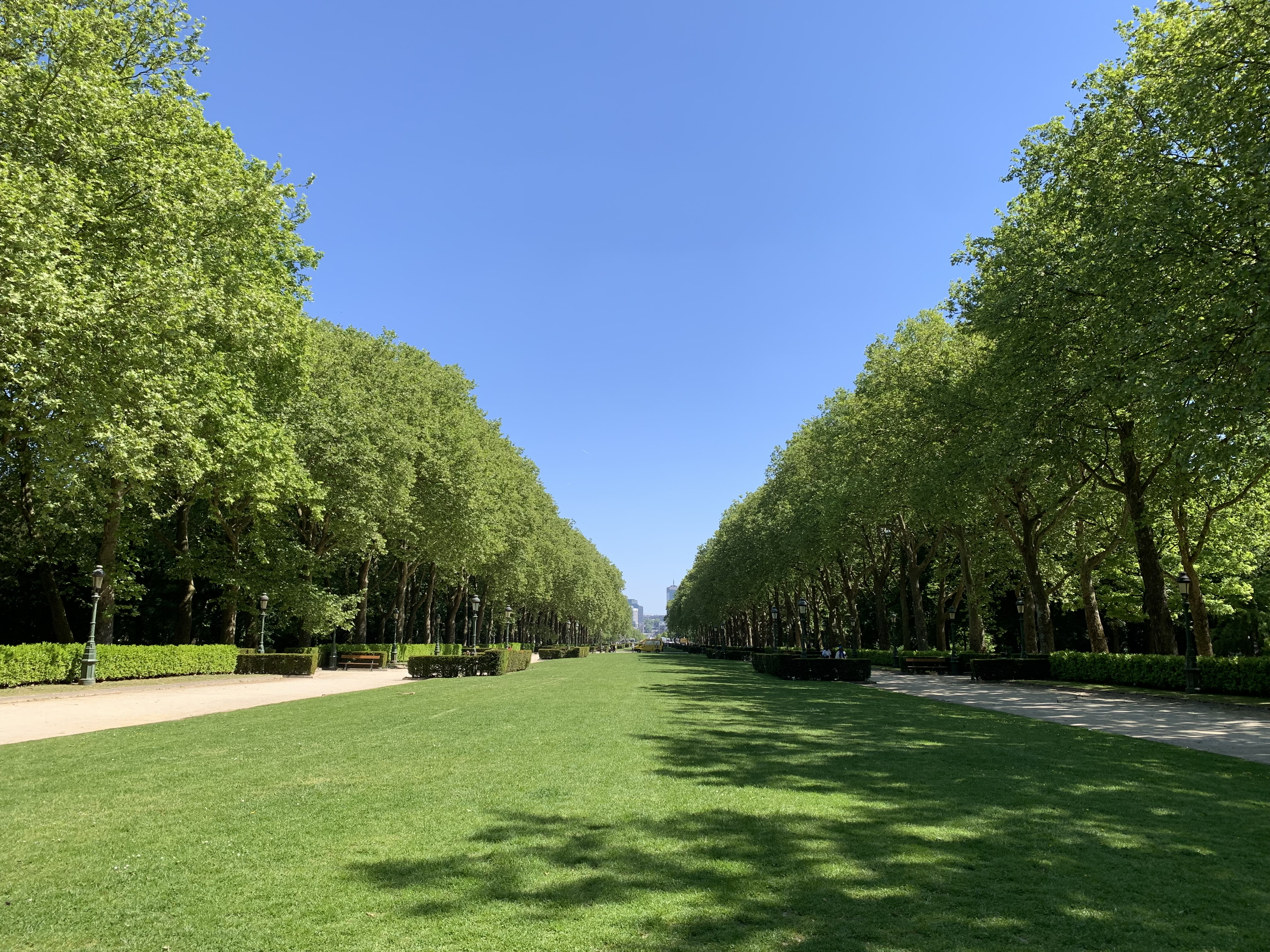
Elisabeth Park

== Politics ==
The current city council was elected in the October 2024 elections. The current mayor of Koekelberg is Olivia P'tito, a member of PS. The socialists won an outright majority in the local election.

== Economy ==
Koekelberg is the birthplace of the modern column still. In 1820, Jean‐Baptiste Cellier‐Blumenthal moved to Koekelberg and did the first experiments with his column still. The Belgians began distilling with his design soon after as they wanted to innovate in their distilleries. It is also home to the first whisky produced in Brussels.
