= Athénée Royal Serge Creuz =

School in Brussels, Belgium

Information
- School type: Secondary school
- Language: French

The Athénée Royal Serge Creuz (ARSC) is a French-language secondary school in the municipality of Molenbeek-Saint-Jean in Brussels, Belgium. It is supported by the French Community of Belgium. There are five locations: Fondamental Prospérité, Fondamental Sippelberg, Secondaire Prospérité, Secondaire Sippelberg, and Secondaire Ch. de Gand.

As of 2014, Fabrice Vanbockestal was the headmaster.

== History ==
In 2006, a group of students rescued a 29-year old teacher from a beating that occurred shortly after he left school.

In 2013, the director of the implantation II basic section was dismissed.
