= Eugène Demolder =

Belgian author

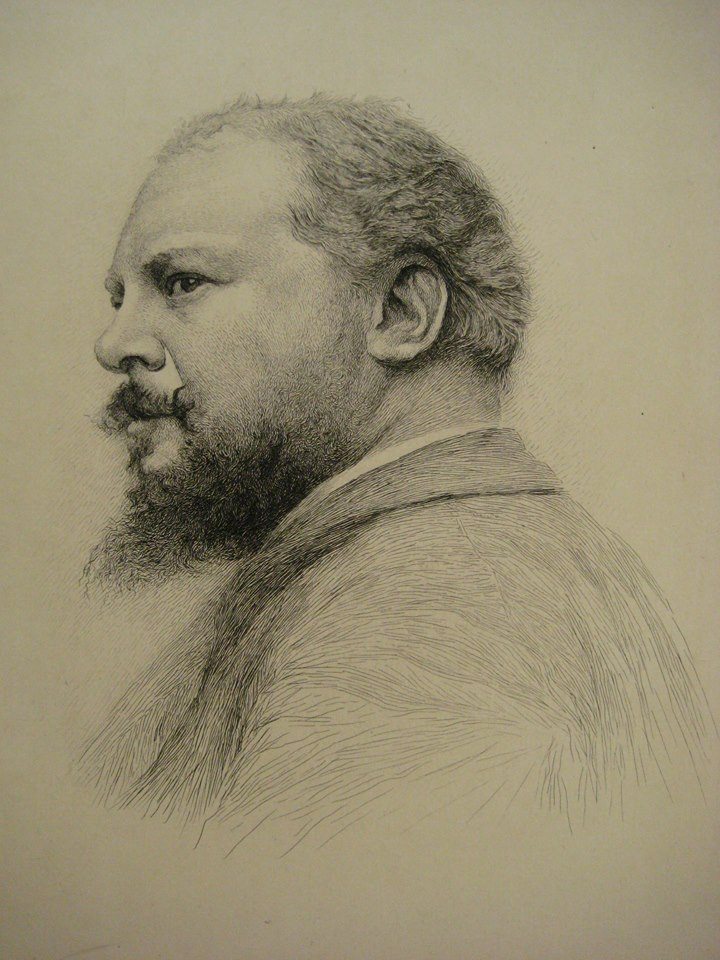
- Born: 16 December 1862; Molenbeek-Saint-Jean, Belgium
- Died: 8 October 1919 (aged 56); Corbeil-Essonnes, France
- Occupation: author

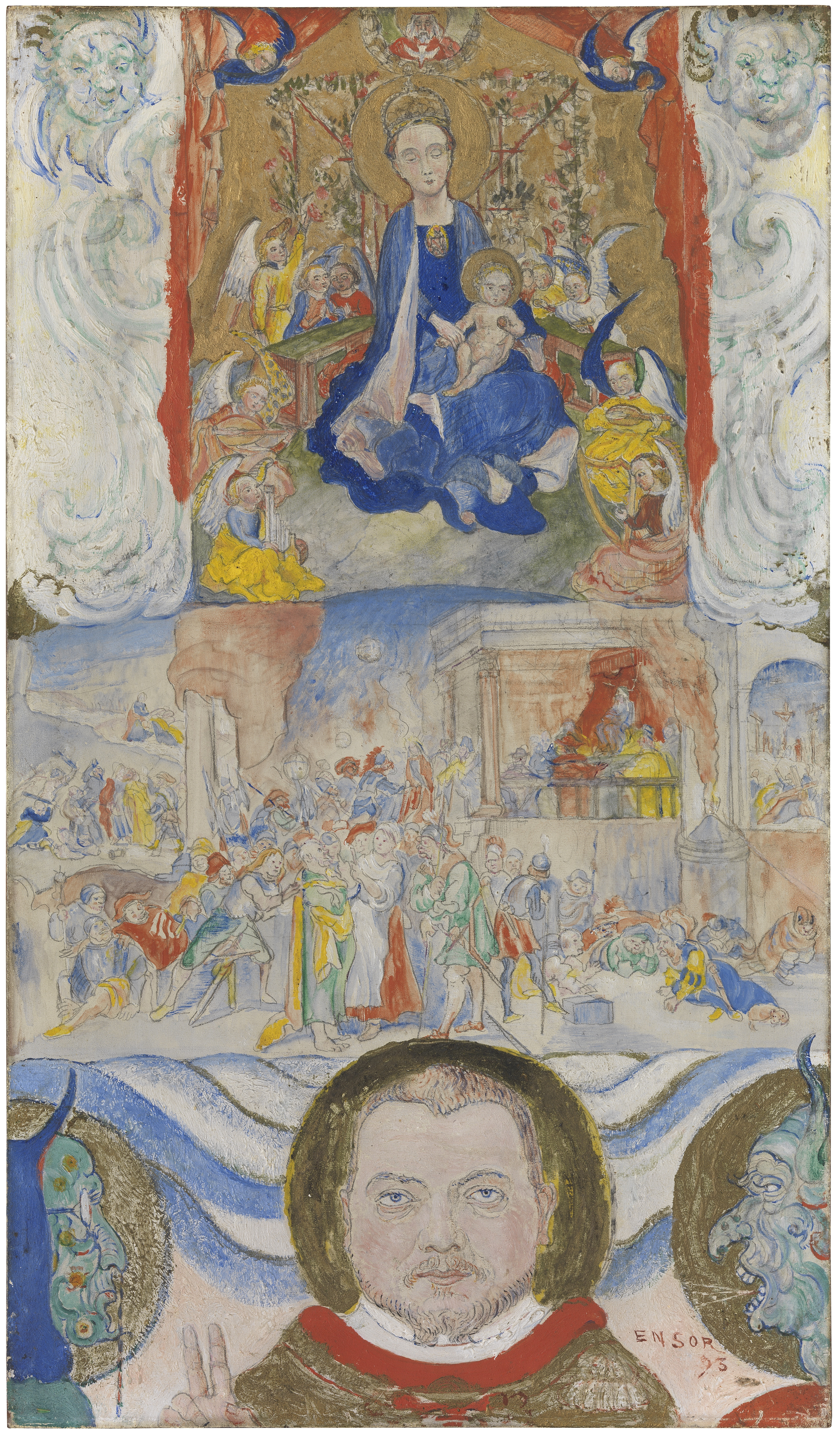
Portrait of Eugène Demolder by James Ensor (1893), Groeningemuseum.

Eugène-Ghislain-Alfred Demolder (16 December 1862 – 8 October 1919) was a Belgian writer.

He is probably best known among English speakers for his romantic novel Le jardinier de la Pompadour, (Madame de Pompadour's Gardener). A novelist, short story writer, and art critic he was also educated in law. His memoirs, Sous la robe (Under the Robe), offers a cultural view of the Belgian professional class of the late 19th century and its involvement in literary reform. (See also cultural movements.) His use of symbolism and mastery of ambience sets his novels apart from earlier romance pieces.

He was a member of La Jeune Belgique (The Young Belgium), a literary review journal which encouraged a literary renaissance movement of 19th century Belgium. This movement was influential in raising the national consciousness of Belgians, ushering in modernism and discouraging romanticism. Demolder contributed to La Jeune Belgique as an art critic and published an early monograph on symbolist artist, James Ensor in 1892. Among his contemporaries were Emile Verhaeren, Max Sulzberger, Edouard Fetis.

Demolder was born in Molenbeek-Saint-Jean and died in Corbeil-Essonnes, France. He married Claire Dulac-Rops, the daughter of the Belgian illustrator and artist Félicien Rops.

== List of works ==
- 1889 - Impressions d'art, études, critiques, transpositions, critique d'art
- 1891 - Contes d'Yperdamme
- 1891 - Le Massacre des innocents
- 1891 - Les Matines de Marie-Madeleine, conte de Pentecôte
- 1893 - Récits de Nazareth
- 1894 - Félicien Rops, étude patronymique
- 1896 - La Legende d'Yperdamme
- 1896 - Le Royaume authentique du grand Saint Nicolas
- 1897 - Quatuor
- 1897 - Sous la robe, ("Under the robe")
- 1899 - La Mort aux berceaux
- 1899 - La Route d'émeraude, ("The Emerald Road")
- 1900 - Die Stimme des Blutes
- 1901 - Le Cœur des pauvres
- 1901 - Constantin Meunier
- 1901 - Les Patins de la reine de Hollande
- 1901 - Trois contemporains: Henri de Brakeleer, Constantin Meunier, Félicien Rops
- 1901 - L'Agonie d'Albion
- 1904 - L'Arche de Monsieur Cheunus ("The arch of Mr. Cheunus")
- 1904 - Le jardinier de la Pompadour has been included in Project Gutenberg
- 1906 - L'Espagne en auto, ("Spain by car")
