= Molenbeek-Saint-Jean =

Municipality of the Brussels-Capital Region, Belgium

Molenbeek-Saint-Jean: Molenbeek-Saint-Jean (French); Sint-Jans-Molenbeek (Dutch)
- Municipality
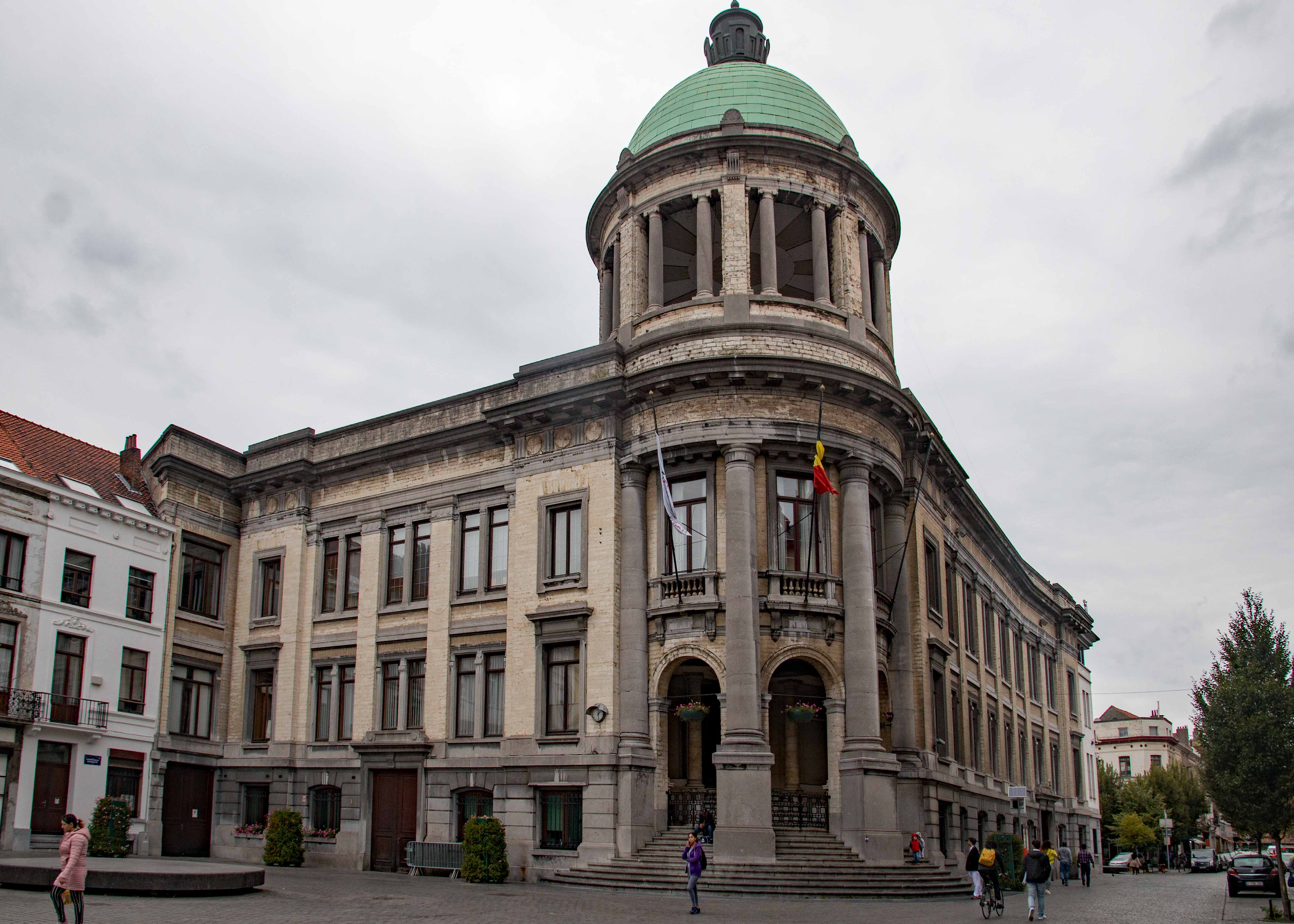
- Molenbeek's Municipal Hall seen from the Place Communale/Gemeenteplein

- Flag Coat of arms

- Molenbeek municipality in the Brussels-Capital Region
- Interactive map of Molenbeek-Saint-Jean
- Location in Belgium
- Coordinates: 50°51′28″N 04°18′57″E
- Country: Belgium
- Community: Flemish Community; French Community
- Region: Brussels-Capital
- Arrondissement: Brussels-Capital

Government
  - Mayor: Catherine Moureaux (PS)
  - Governing parties: PS, PTB, Molenbeek Autrement

Area
  - Total: 6.02 km^{2} (2.32 sq mi)

Population (2020-01-01)
  - Total: 97,979
  - Density: 16,300/km^{2} (42,200/sq mi)
- Postal codes: 1080
- NIS code: 21012
- Area codes: 02
- Website: molenbeek.irisnet.be/fr (in French) molenbeek.irisnet.be/nl (in Dutch)

Molenbeek-Saint-Jean (French, pronounced [molœnbek sɛ̃ ʒɑ̃]) or Sint-Jans-Molenbeek (Dutch, pronounced [sɪɲˈtɕɑns ˈmoːlə(m)ˌbeːk]), often simply called Molenbeek, is one of the 19 municipalities of the Brussels-Capital Region, Belgium. Located in the western part of the region, it is bordered by the City of Brussels, from which it is separated by the Brussels–Charleroi Canal, as well as by the municipalities of Anderlecht, Berchem-Sainte-Agathe, Dilbeek, Jette, and Koekelberg. The Molenbeek brook, from which it takes its name, flows through the municipality. Like all municipalities in Brussels, it is officially bilingual (French–Dutch).

From its origins in the Middle Ages until the 18th century, Molenbeek was a rural village on the edge of Brussels, but around the turn of the 19th century, it experienced major growth brought on by a boom in commerce and manufacturing during the Industrial Revolution. Its prosperity declined after the Second World War, owing to deindustrialisation, leading to extensive investment and regeneration. Experiencing a strong movement of immigration, mainly Moroccan, from the 1950s and 1960s, Molenbeek became increasingly multicultural with a minority Muslim population. In the 2010s, it gained international attention as the base for Islamist terrorists who carried out attacks in both Paris and Brussels.

Molenbeek is a mostly residential municipality consisting of several historically and architecturally distinct districts. As of 1 January 2024, the municipality had a population of 98,365 inhabitants. The total area is 6.02 km^{2} (2.32 sq mi), which gives a population density of 16,352/km^{2} (42,350/sq mi), twice the average of Brussels. Its upper area is greener and less densely populated.

== Toponymy ==
=== Etymology ===
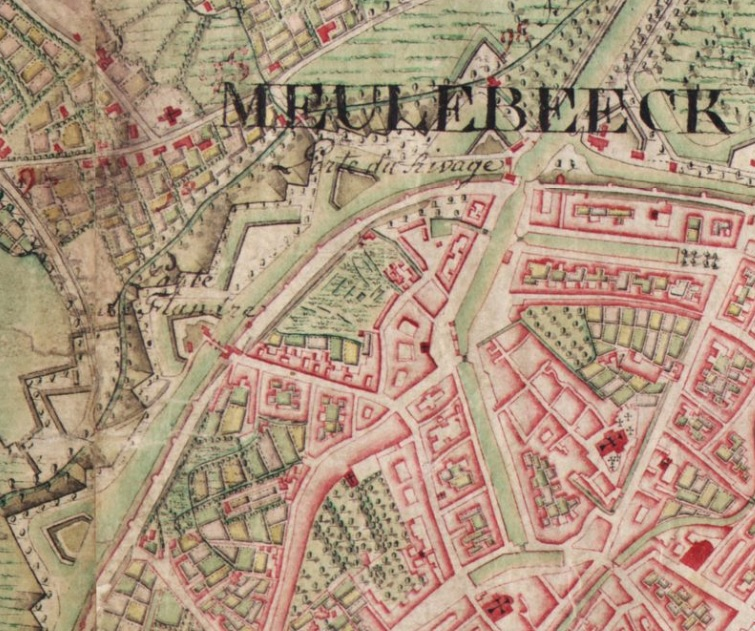
The village of Molenbeek (spelled Meulebeeck) marked on the 18th-century Ferraris map

The name Molenbeek derives from two Dutch words: molen, meaning "mill", and beek, meaning "brook"; and could be literally translated as "Millbrook" in English. It is a very common name for brooks in the Netherlands and Belgium, such as the Molenbeek (Erpe-Mere Bovenschelde), as well as the Molenbeek-Ter Erpenbeek, both in the Denderstreek, Belgium.

Although first applied to the brook that flowed through the village, the name Molenbeek (originally spelled Molembecca) eventually came to be used to designate the village itself, around the year 985. The suffix Saint-Jean in French or Sint-Jans in Dutch, meaning "Saint John", refers to the parish's patron saint, Saint John the Baptist, though it is seldom used in everyday speech, today's inhabitants—whether French or Dutch speaking—usually shortening the name to simply Molenbeek.

=== Pronunciation ===
In French, Molenbeek-Saint-Jean is pronounced [molənbeːk sɛ̃ ʒɑ̃], and in Dutch, Sint-Jans-Molenbeek is pronounced [sɪɲˈtɕɑns ˈmoːlə(m)ˌbeːk] (in both languages, the "-beek" is pronounced like "bake" in English). Inhabitants of Molenbeek are known in French as Molenbeekois (pronounced [molənbeːkwa]) and in Dutch as Molenbeekenaars (pronounced [ˈmoːlə(m)ˌbeːkənaːrs]). In France, the pronunciations [molənbɛk sɛ̃ ʒɑ̃] ("-beek" like "beck" in English) and [molənbɛkwa] (for molenbeekois) are often heard, but are rather rare in Belgium. The dialectal forms Muilebeik and Meulebeik are still used by older adults of Belgian ancestry, whilst the abbreviations Molen and Molem are common among younger speakers.

== History ==
=== Rural beginnings ===
As early as the 9th century, Molenbeek was the site of a church dedicated to Saint John the Baptist. The parish boundaries of St. John's Church were much greater than today, reaching as far as the river Senne, and from the end of the 12th century, included a chapel dedicated to Saint Catherine. This chapel was split off from the rest of the parish following the construction of Brussels' second city walls and gradually became the current Church of St. Catherine in the Quays or Sainte-Catherine/Sint-Katelijne Quarter of Brussels. The first documented mention of Molenbeek was made on 9 April 1174 in a papal bull by Pope Alexander III listing the property of the chapter of the Collegiate Church of St. Michael and St. Gudula (now Brussels' cathedral), which included St. John's Church, as well as other property. The Brussels Beguinage, founded before 1247 outside the city walls, also depended on Molenbeek.

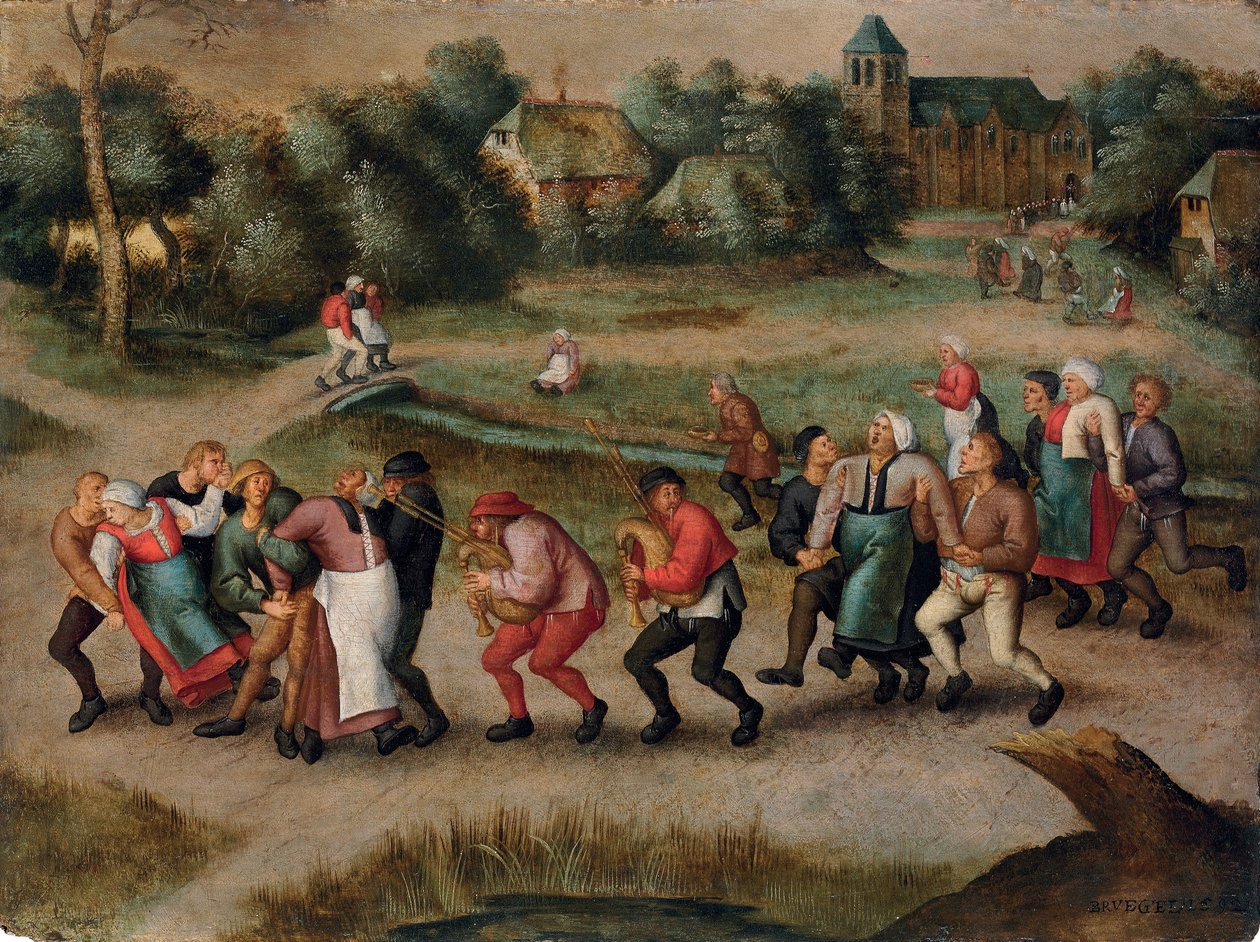
Saint John's Dancers in Molenbeeck', Pieter Brueghel the Younger, 1592

In the early Middle Ages, Molenbeek was known for its miraculous spring of Saint Gertrude of Nivelles, the mythical founder of Nivelles Abbey, which attracted thousands of pilgrims. According to legend, she visited Molenbeek and offered the land on which the village's first church was built, and allegedly caused this sacred spring to spur out by ramming her abbess's crosier into the ground near the church. Later, the tradition of a special pilgrimage for patients with epilepsy developed around St. John's Church. On St. John's Day (24 June), a dancing procession took place, in which epileptics could be freed from their illness for a year if they crossed a bridge over the Molenbeek brook towards the church without their feet touching the ground. A painting by Pieter Brueghel the Younger, dating from 1592, illustrates this procession.

Molenbeek was made part of Brussels in the 13th century. As a result, the agricultural village lost a lot of its land to its more powerful neighbour. In addition, St. John's Church was dismantled in 1578 during the Calvinist Republic of Brussels, which lasted from 1577 to 1585, leading to further decline, though it was later rebuilt on the same spot. The town's aspect remained mostly rural until the 18th century.

=== Industrialisation ===
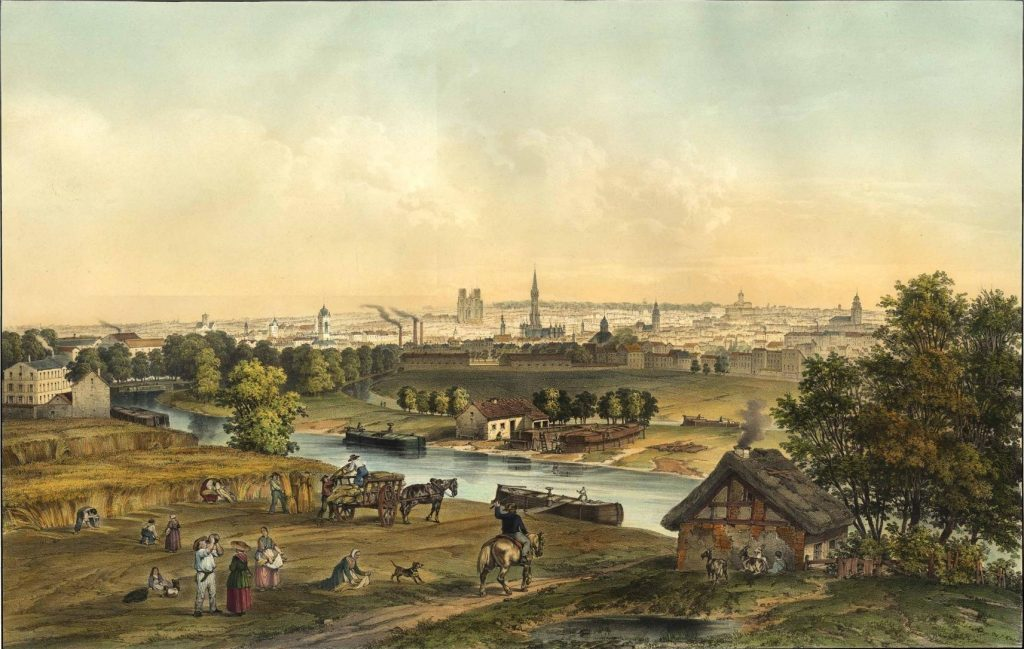
View into Brussels along the Brussels–Charleroi Canal from Molenbeek, c. 1855

At the end of the 18th century, the Industrial Revolution brought prosperity back to Molenbeek through commerce and manufacturing. In 1795, under the French regime, the town regained its status as an independent municipality. Around that time, Molenbeek experienced its first wave of urbanisation with the development of a neighbourhood, known as the Faubourg Saint-Martin, around a number of streets to the immediate west of the City of Brussels, as well as another, the Faubourg de Flandre, a little more to the north.

During the first quarter of the 19th century, several hundred workers were employed in Molenbeek's chemical and textile industries. In total, there were fifty companies in Molenbeek in 1829. The opening of the Brussels–Charleroi Canal in 1832 greatly increased the traffic of coal and thus the mechanisation of industry, which led to the development of foundries, engineering and metalworking companies in the municipality. Attracted by the industrial opportunities, many workers moved in, first from the other Belgian provinces (mainly rural residents from Flanders) and France, then from Southern European, and more recently from Eastern European and African countries.

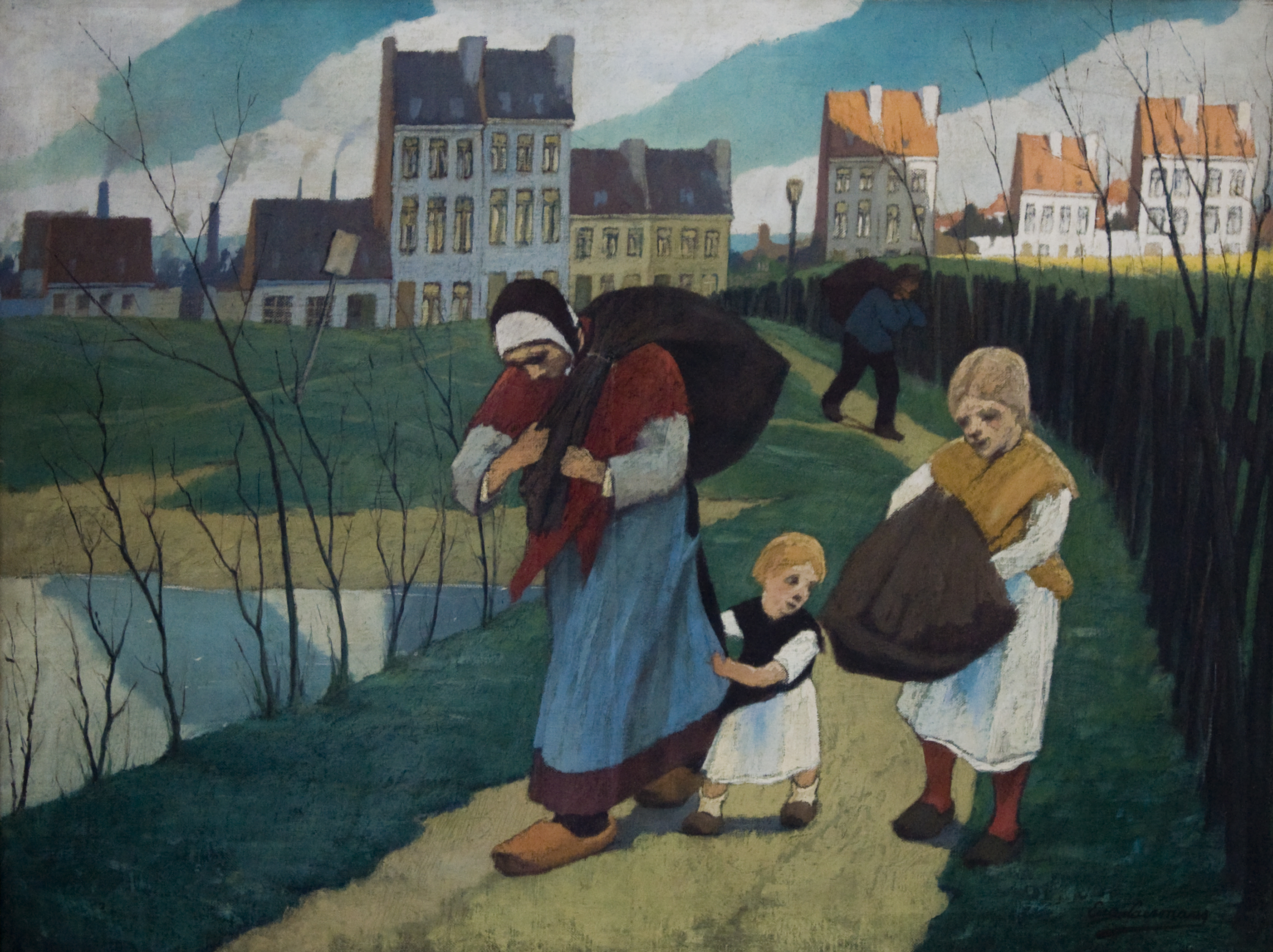
De voddenrapers (The Trash Pickers), Eugène Laermans (1914), with Molenbeek as setting

The growth of the community continued unabated throughout the 19th century, leading to cramped living conditions, especially near the canal. In that period, Molenbeek was dubbed the Little Manchester (French: le petit Manchester, Dutch: het Klein Manchester) or the Belgian Manchester (French: le Manchester belge, Dutch: het Belgisch Manchester), in reference to the Northern English city that led the history of industrialisation. On 5 May 1835, Molenbeek was the departure site of the first passenger train in continental Europe. At the end of the 19th century, part of the industry, namely the port area, was lost by Molenbeek when Brussels annexed and reintegrated the canal area within its new port.

=== 20th century ===
Until the early 20th century, Molenbeek was a booming suburb which attracted a large working-class population. Remarkable new urban developments and garden cities such as the Cité Diongre were built at the beginning of the century to house the influx of newcomers. The Church of St. John the Baptist was also rebuilt between 1930 and 1932 in Art Deco style to accommodate this growing populace. The industrial decline, however, which had already started before World War I, accelerated after the Great Depression and World War II.

Following the industrial decline after the war, the old districts bordering the City of Brussels began to decrease in population. Much of the original Belgian working-class population, when its financial means allowed it, left the lower Molenbeek for Brussels' newly developing suburbs. In this lower part of the town, new immigrant populations moved in, leading to the present-day urban fabric. The depopulation was not addressed until the 1960s through the construction of new residential areas in the then-rural west of the municipality. In the 1990s, this expansion was halted, leaving some woods and meadows in Molenbeek, such as the semi-natural site of the Scheutbos.

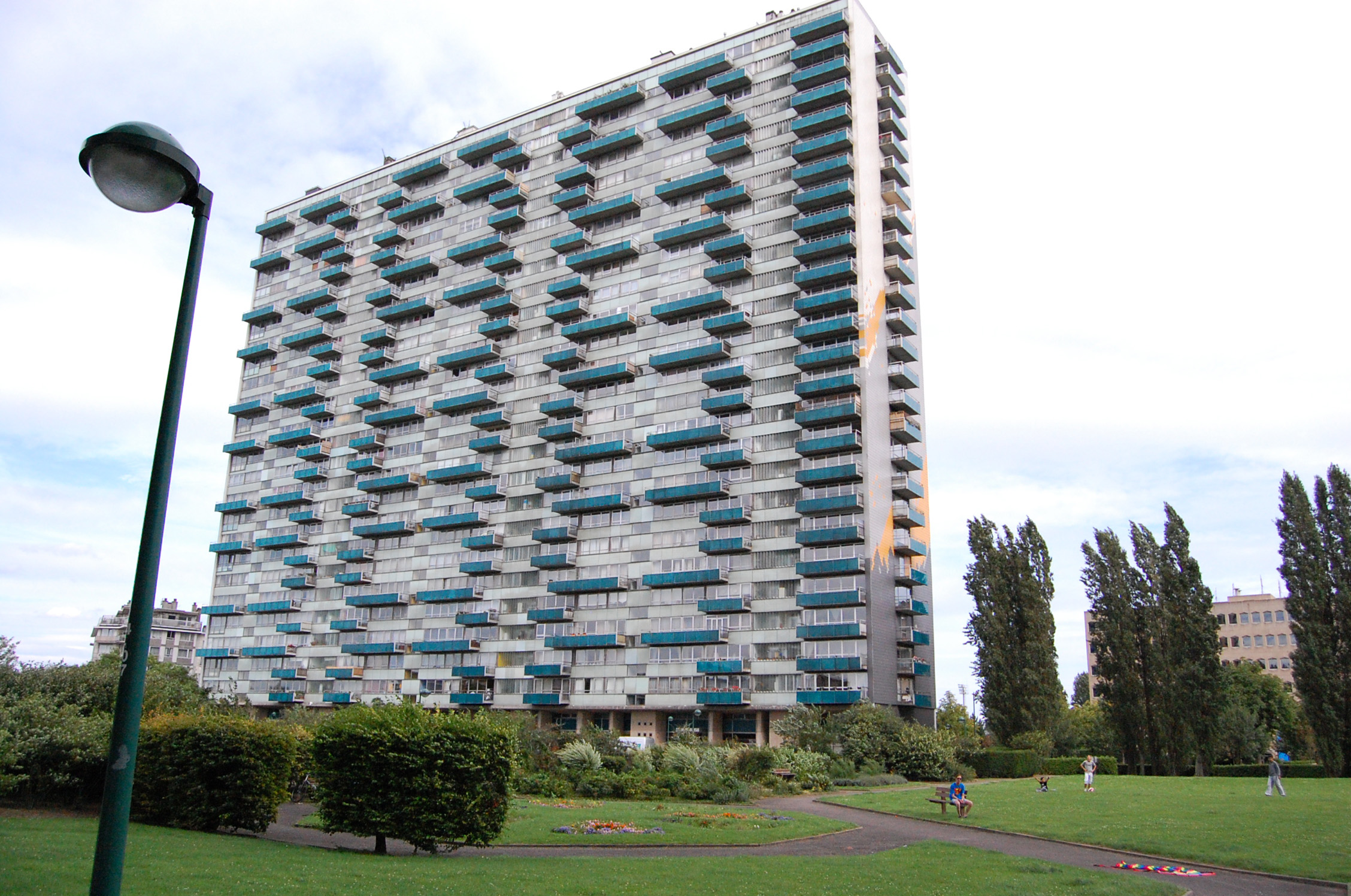
L'Écluse Tower on the Boulevard Louis Mettewie/Louis Mettewielaan

Where Molenbeek was once a centre of intense industrial activity, concentrated around the canal and the railway, most of those industries have disappeared to make way for large-scale urban renewal following the modernist Athens Charter, such as the L'Écluse Tower along the Boulevard Louis Mettewie/Louis Mettewielaan in the upper town and the Brunfaut Tower near the canal. In addition, clearance work for the extension of the metro in the 1970s and 1980s led to further destruction. In spite of this, Molenbeek has maintained its character to this day. This industrial past is still remembered in the Brussels Museum of Industry and Labour, a museum of social and industrial history built on the site of the former foundry of the Compagnie des Bronzes de Bruxelles.

=== 21st century ===
In some areas of Molenbeek, the ensuing poverty left its mark on the urban landscape and scarred the social life of the community, leading to rising crime rates and pervading cultural intolerance. Various local revitalisation programmes are currently under way, aiming at relieving the municipality's most impoverished districts. Currently, the local economy is renewing itself, but it is "dominated" by the administrative sector. Alongside large companies such as KBC Bank and the distribution company Delhaize, there are administrations such as that of the Ministry of the French Community and numerous businesses.

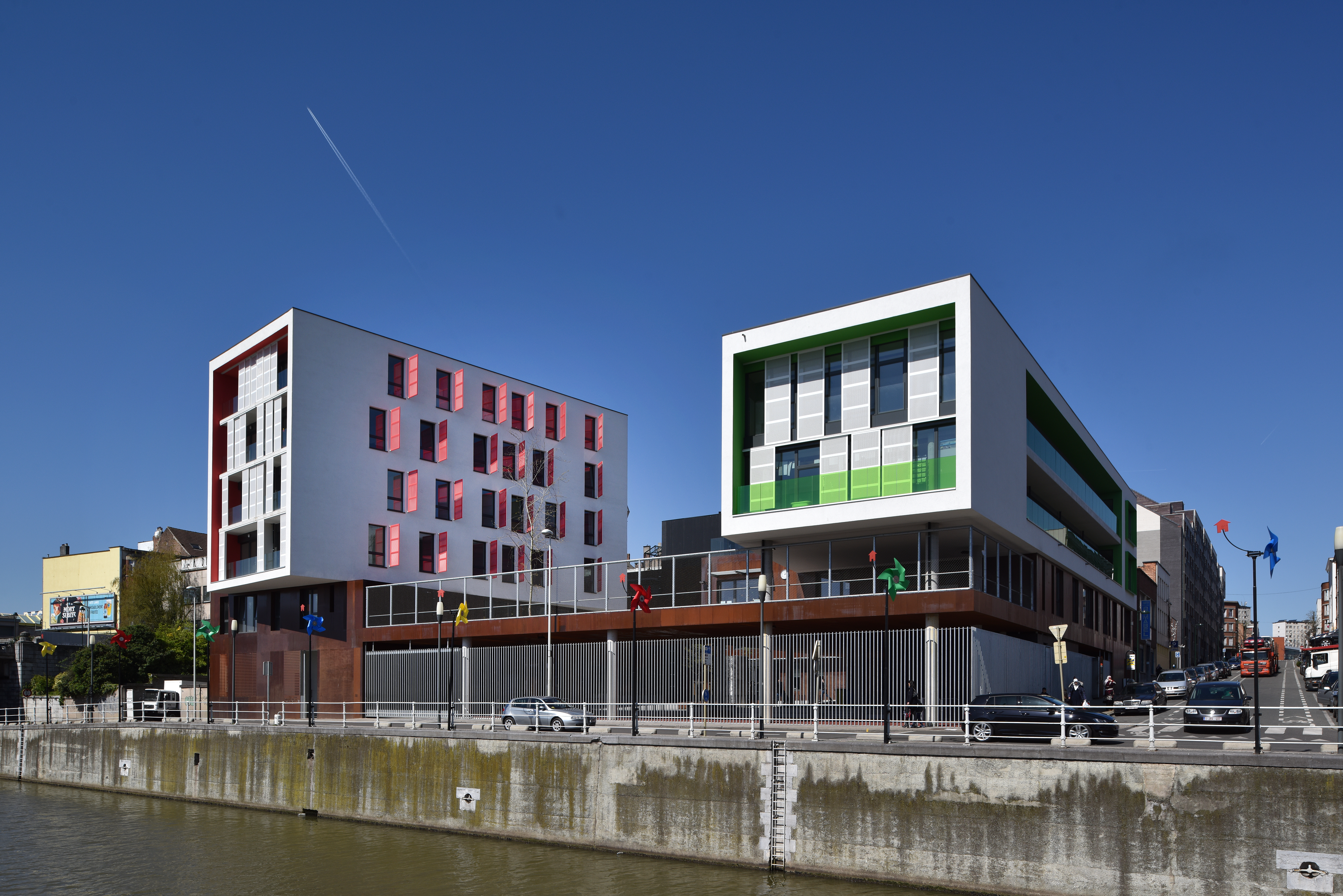
Bonne–Mariemont project on the Quai de Mariemont/Mariemontkaai

Attempts at revitalising the municipality have, however, not always been successful. In June 2011, the multinational company BBDO, citing over 150 attacks on their staff by locals, posted an open letter to then-mayor Philippe Moureaux, announcing its withdrawal from the municipality. As a result, serious questions were raised about governance, security and the administration of Moureaux. Following a general decrease in crime, the company finally decided to remain in Molenbeek.

==== Islamic terrorism ====
According to Le Monde, the assassins who killed anti-Taliban commander Ahmed Shah Massoud both came from Molenbeek. Hassan el-Haski, one of the 2004 Madrid terror bombers, came from Molenbeek. The perpetrator of the Jewish Museum of Belgium shooting, Mehdi Nemmouche, lived in Molenbeek for a time. Ayoub El Khazzani, the perpetrator of the 2015 Thalys train attack, stayed with his sister in Molenbeek. French police believe the weapons used in the Porte de Vincennes siege two days after the Charlie Hebdo shooting were sourced from Molenbeek. The bombers of the November 2015 Paris attacks were also traced to Molenbeek; during the Molenbeek capture of Salah Abdeslam, an accomplice of the Paris bombers, protesters "threw stones and bottles at police and press during the arrest", stated the then-Interior Minister of Belgium, Jan Jambon. Oussama Zariouh, the bomber of Brussels Central Station in June 2017, lived in Molenbeek.

At least four of the terrorists in the November 2015 Paris attacks—the brothers Brahim and Salah Abdeslam, alleged accomplice Mohamed Abrini, and the alleged mastermind Abdelhamid Abaaoud—grew up and lived in Molenbeek. According to former French President François Hollande, that was also where they organised the attacks. On 18 March 2016, Salah Abdeslam, a suspected accomplice in those attacks, was captured in two anti-terrorist raids in Molenbeek that killed another suspect and injured two others.

Since several of the attackers in the Paris and Brussels terrorist attacks had connections to the area, Belgian police started door-to-door checks in which a quarter of Molenbeek's inhabitants were investigated, a total of 22,668. This operation resulted in that of the 1,600 organisations investigated, 102 were found to be involved with crime and a further 52 were involved with terrorism. 72 individuals were found to have a terrorist connection and were subject to future surveillance.

== Geography ==
=== Location ===
Location of Molenbeek within Brussels

Molenbeek is located in the north-central part of Belgium, about 110 kilometres (68 mi) from the Belgian coast and about 180 km (110 mi) from Belgium's southern tip. It is located in the heartland of the Brabantian Plateau, about 45 km (28 mi) south of Antwerp (Flanders), and 50 km (31 mi) north of Charleroi (Wallonia). It is the third westernmost municipality in the Brussels-Capital Region after Anderlecht and Berchem-Sainte-Agathe and is an important crossing point for the Brussels–Charleroi Canal, which borders the municipality to the east. With an area of 6.02 km^{2} (2.32 sq mi), it is also a relatively small municipality in the region, ranking eleventh out of nineteen. It is bordered by the Brussels municipalities of Anderlecht, Berchem-Sainte-Agathe, Jette and Koekelberg, as well as the Flemish municipality of Dilbeek.

=== Climate ===
Molenbeek, in common with the rest of Brussels, experiences an oceanic climate (Köppen: Cfb) with warm summers and cool winters. Proximity to coastal areas influences the area's climate by sending marine air masses from the Atlantic Ocean. Nearby wetlands also ensure a maritime temperate climate. On average (based on measurements in the period 1991–2020), there are approximately 130 days of rain per year in the region. It also often experiences violent thunderstorms in the summer months.

Climate data for Molenbeek-Saint-Jean (1991−2020 normals)
Month	Jan	Feb	Mar	Apr	May	Jun	Jul	Aug	Sep	Oct	Nov	Dec	Year
Mean daily maximum °C (°F)	6.7 (44.1)	7.7 (45.9)	11.4 (52.5)	15.6 (60.1)	19.1 (66.4)	21.9 (71.4)	24.0 (75.2)	23.8 (74.8)	20.2 (68.4)	15.5 (59.9)	10.4 (50.7)	7.0 (44.6)	15.3 (59.5)
Daily mean °C (°F)	3.8 (38.8)	4.2 (39.6)	7.0 (44.6)	10.1 (50.2)	13.8 (56.8)	16.8 (62.2)	18.8 (65.8)	18.4 (65.1)	15.2 (59.4)	11.3 (52.3)	7.2 (45.0)	4.3 (39.7)	10.9 (51.6)
Mean daily minimum °C (°F)	1.0 (33.8)	0.8 (33.4)	2.6 (36.7)	4.7 (40.5)	8.5 (47.3)	11.6 (52.9)	13.6 (56.5)	13.1 (55.6)	10.1 (50.2)	7.2 (45.0)	4.0 (39.2)	1.7 (35.1)	6.6 (43.9)
Average precipitation mm (inches)	69.7 (2.74)	60.7 (2.39)	54.2 (2.13)	45.2 (1.78)	57.6 (2.27)	68.8 (2.71)	72.2 (2.84)	84.8 (3.34)	63.0 (2.48)	66.2 (2.61)	73.8 (2.91)	84.8 (3.34)	800.9 (31.53)
Average precipitation days (≥ 1.0 mm)	12.2	11.4	10.8	9.2	10.5	9.9	10.1	10.3	9.7	10.6	12.0	13.4	130.0
Mean monthly sunshine hours	61	76	129	178	204	204	210	198	157	115	68	50	1,651
Source: Royal Meteorological Institute

== Districts ==
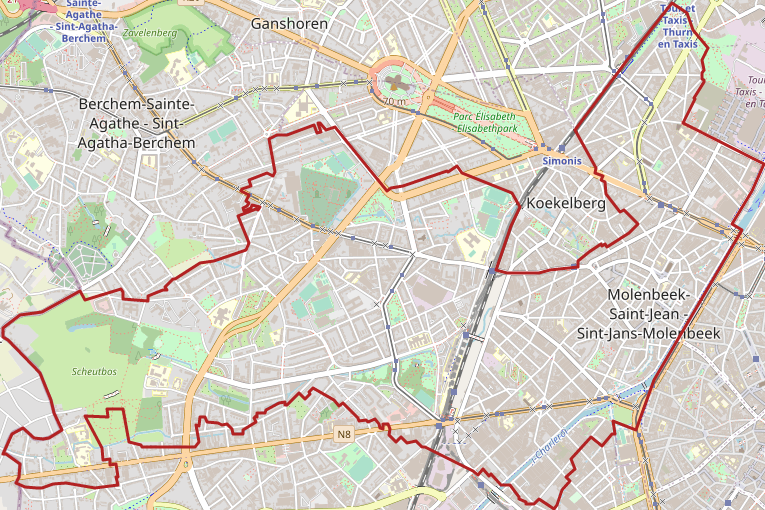
Map of Molenbeek

There are two distinct areas in Molenbeek: a lower area and an upper area. The lower area, next to the canal, consists of working-class, predominantly migrant, communities, mostly of Moroccan (mainly Riffian and Berber) descent, with many being second- and third-generation. The upper area, close to the Greater Ring (Brussels' second ring road), features newer construction and is mostly middle-class and residential.

The territory of Molenbeek is very heterogeneous and is characterised by a mixture of larger districts including smaller residential and (formerly) industrial neighbourhoods. The area along the canal is currently experiencing a large revitalisation programme, as part of the Plan Canal of the Brussels-Capital Region.

=== Lower Molenbeek ===
==== Historical centre ====
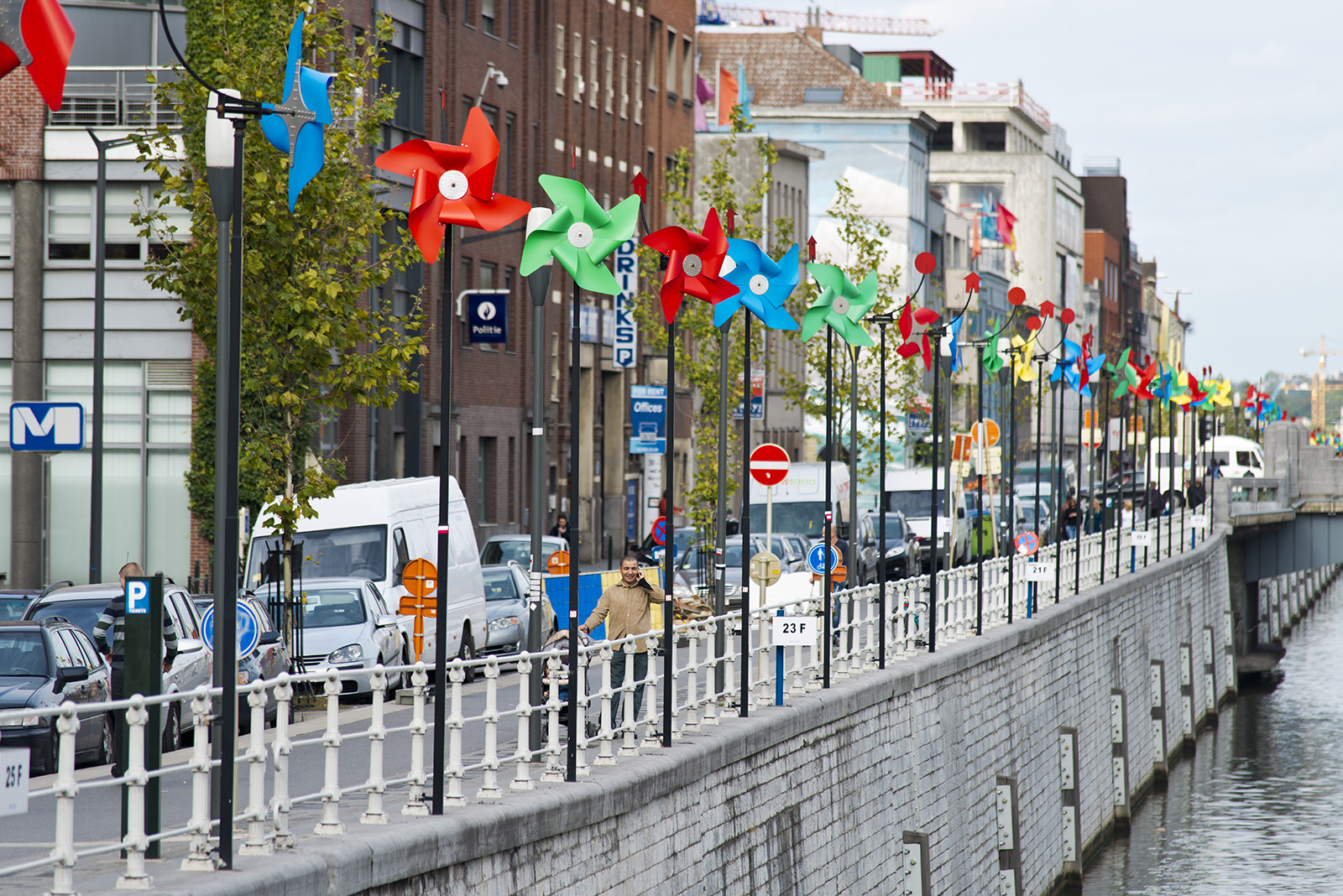
Pinwheels along the canal in Molenbeek

The historical centre of Molenbeek, sometimes referred to as Old Molenbeek, is the municipality's central district. It is bounded by the Brussels–Charleroi Canal to the east and by the Boulevard Léopold II/Leopold II-laan to the north, with the Chaussée de Gand/Gentsesteenweg as its central artery. It grew up around the medieval village core, located on the site of the present-day Parvis Saint Jean-Baptiste/Sint-Jan-Baptistvoorplein. During the Industrial Revolution, it was a centre of intense industrial activity, concentrated around the canal, and is currently in a fragile social and economic situation due to the decline of its economy and the poor quality of some of its housing. Landmarks from this period include the Brussels Museum of Industry and Labour, a former foundry, and the Gosset factory with its Art Deco/modernist architecture, several former breweries converted into hotels (Hôtel Belvue) or event venues (Brussels Event Brewery), as well as many private lofts. The Municipal Hall of Molenbeek is located on the Place Communale/Gemeenteplein ("Municipal Square"), in the heart of this district.

==== Duchesse (Quatre-vents) ====
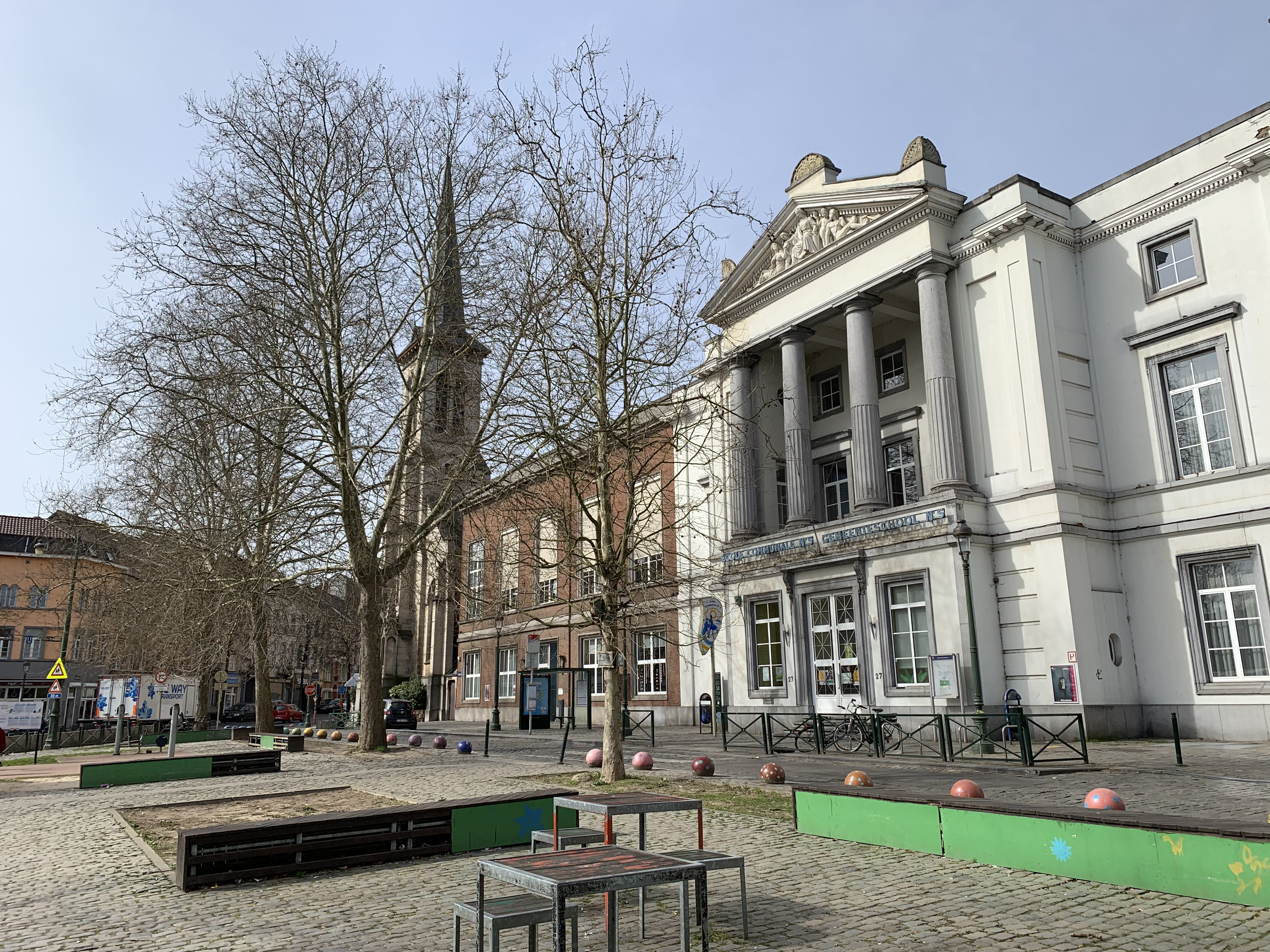
Place de la Duchesse de Brabant/Hertogin van Brabantplein

Located to the south of the historical centre of Molenbeek, this district is centred on the Place de la Duchesse de Brabant/Hertogin van Brabantplein. The square was created in 1847 on the grounds of the Hospices de Bruxelles, of which only the neoclassical facade remains. The hospice buildings now house a primary school (Municipal School no. 5). In 1869, the Church of St. Barbara was erected there for the Catholic worship of the new parish. The Rue de Birmingham/Birminghamstraat, the Rue de Manchester/Manchesterstraat, the Rue de la Princesse/Prinsesstraat, the Rue Vanderstraeten/Vanderstraetenstraat and the Rue Isidoor Teirlinck/Isidoor Teirlinckstraat also end there.

==== Heyvaert ====
Located in the south-east of Molenbeek, near the Abattoirs of Anderlecht (the main slaughterhouse in Brussels) and along the Charleroi Canal, Heyvaert is part of the larger Cureghem/Kuregem district. It is bounded by the Rue Nicolas Doyen/Nicolas Doyenstraat, the Rue de Birmingham, the Place de la Duchesse de Brabant, the Rue Isidoor Teirlinck, the Rue Delaunoy/Delaunoystraat, and the Rue Heyvaert/Heyvaertstraat (formerly called the Rue de l'Écluse/Sasstraat because of its proximity to the canal lock; écluse meaning "lock" in French). The district, formerly primarily industrial, now offers an environment characterised by the used car trade, particularly exports to West Africa, as well as other related activities.

==== Maritime Quarter ====
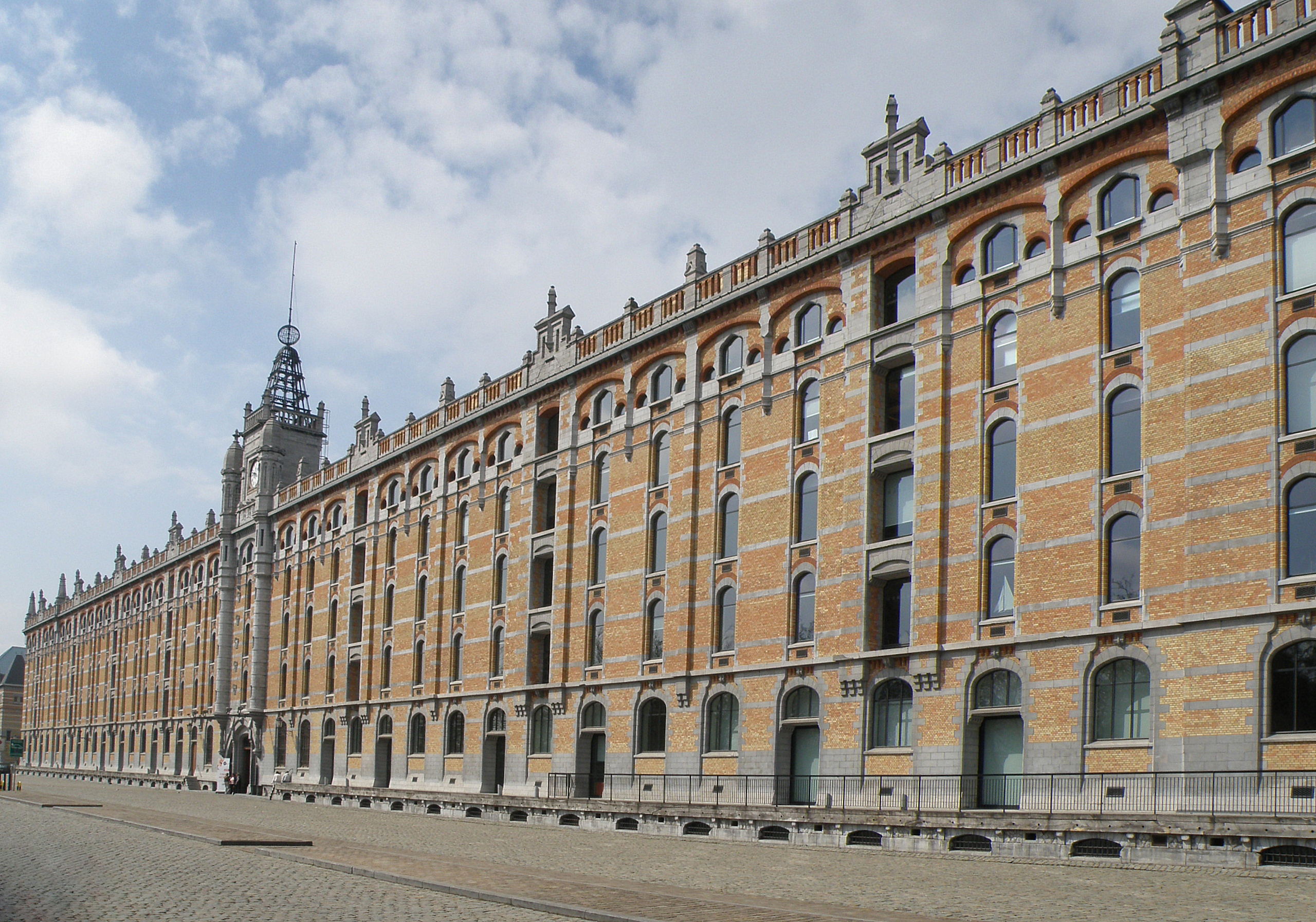
Royal Depot of Tour & Taxis

Located in the north of Molenbeek, with a piece extending into the City of Brussels, the Maritime Quarter (French: Quartier Maritime, Dutch: Maritiemwijk) was born, around 1900, from the implementation of the Port of Brussels and the Maritime Station on the Tour & Taxis site. A number of customs agencies and handling activities mingled with homes were concentrated there and have given the neighbourhood a diverse character. The residents, historically made up of workers, as well as of the small and large bourgeoisie, were also from the outset of great diversity. In the interwar period, the Foyer Molenbeekois/Molenbeekse Haard housing cooperative built several large-scale social housing complexes for workers and employees in the district. Many traces of this history can still be found today, including old factories and workshops, as well as Art Deco and modernist apartment buildings, designed by architects such as Joseph Diongre, Armand de Saulnier and François Van Meulecom.

=== Upper Molenbeek ===
==== Karreveld ====
Located in the north of the upper part of Molenbeek, Karreveld Park and its surrounding district are named after the former domain of Karreveld Castle, which now covers 3 ha (7.4 acres). The name Karreveld derives from the Old Dutch Karreelvelt, meaning "field of brick earth", referring to the local brickmaking activity that continued into the early 20th century. Today, it is a mostly residential neighbourhood between the Avenue de la Liberté/Vrijheidslaan, the Chaussée de Gand and the railroad.

==== Korenbeek ====
Located in the north-east of Molenbeek, Korenbeek takes its name from a former stream that originated near the present-day Rue du Korenbeek/Korenbeekstraat and once fed the ponds of Karreveld Castle. The largely residential neighbourhood is characterised by mid-sized housing and a historically mixed working-class population. It is notably home to Molenbeek Cemetery between the Chaussée de Gand and the Boulevard Louis Mettewie/Louis Mettewielaan. This cemetery was inaugurated in 1864 to replace the old parish cemetery around the Church of St. John the Baptist, which had become too small, and whose last remains were cleared in 1932.

==== Machtens (Marie-José) ====
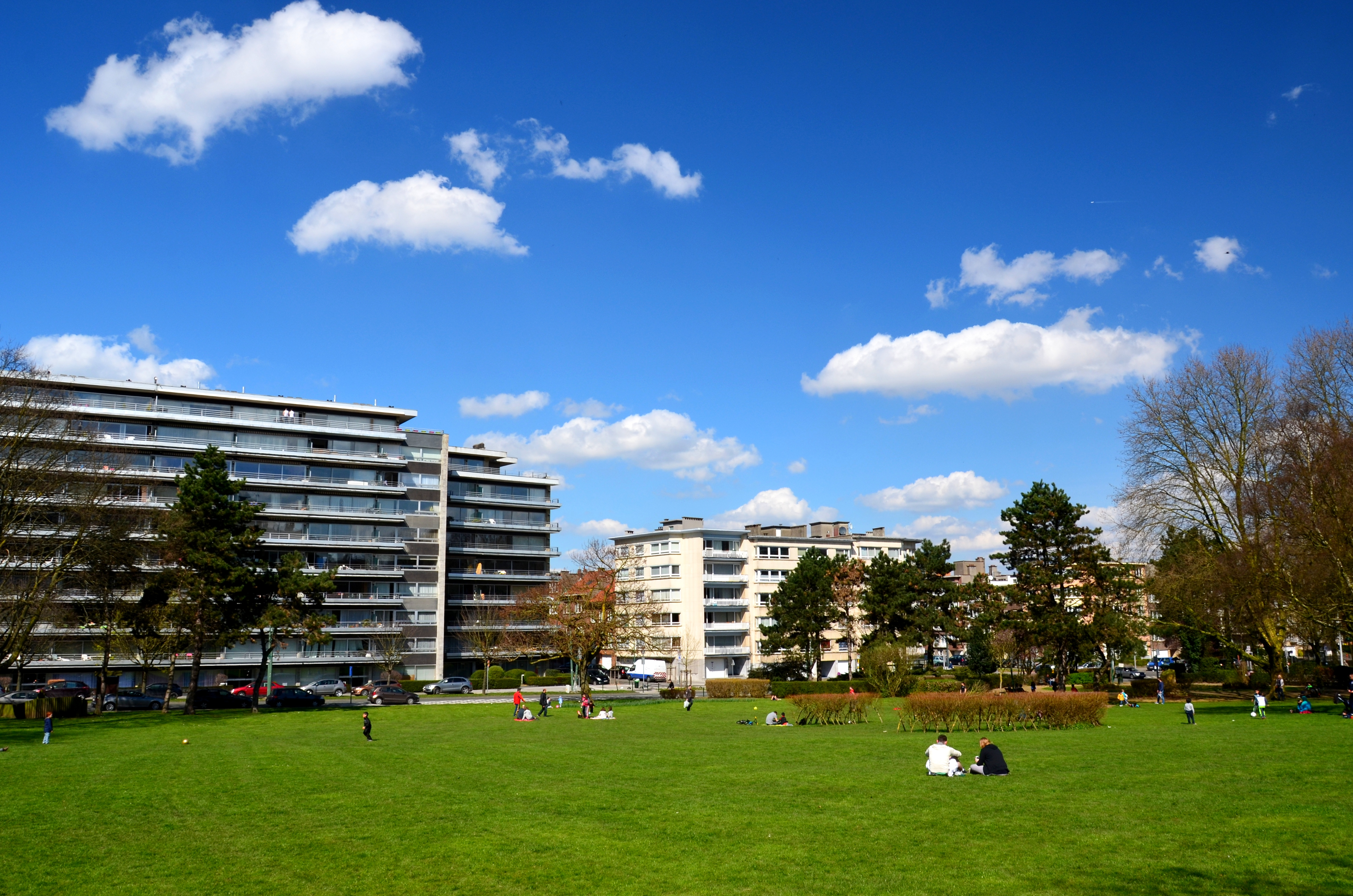
Albert Park

Located in the upper part of Molenbeek, this district lies in the valley of the Maalbeek (or Molenbeek) that gave the municipality its name. Originally, the area was part of the former Oostendaal estate. In 1920, it was purchased by the municipality and partly turned into two parks, Albert Park and Marie-José Park, in the triangle formed by the Boulevard Edmond Machtens/Edmond Machtenslaan, the Avenue De Roovere/De Rooverelaan and the Boulevard Joseph Baeck/Joseph Baecklaan. They were designed by the architect and urban planner Louis Van der Swaelmen, and are named after King Albert I and his daughter, Princess Marie-José, the last Queen of Italy.

==== Osseghem/Ossegem ====
Osseghem/Ossegem is centrally located in the upper part of Molenbeek, west of the municipality's historical centre. The neighbourhood used to be a rural hamlet. The name is of Germanic (Frankish) origin and is composed of Odso + -inga + heim, meaning "residence/domain of the family of Odso". An old country road, today's Rue d'Osseghem/Ossegemstraat, which led to the Chaussée de Gand near the current Osseghem/Ossegem metro station, connected the hamlet to Molenbeek and Brussels.

==== Scheutbos (Mettewie) ====
Located in the extreme west of Molenbeek, near the Boulevard Louis Mettewie, the Scheutbos (or Scheutbosch) is the municipality's remaining green area, home to the likewise named semi-natural site of the Scheutbos. It is a predominantly residential neighbourhood, characterised by broad avenues and large post-war housing complexes interspersed with extensive green spaces.

== Main sights ==
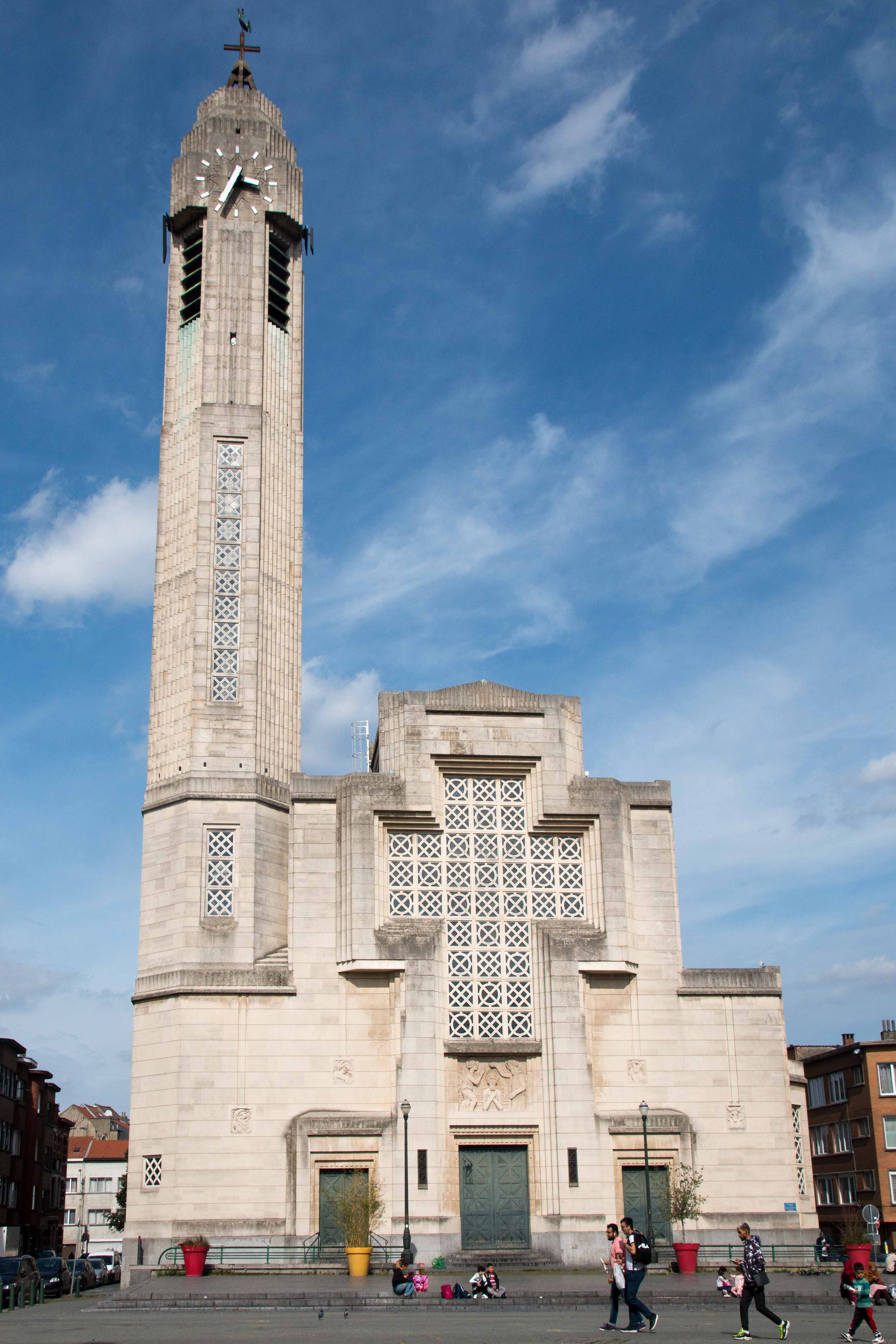
Church of St. John the Baptist

Molenbeek-Saint-Jean has a rich cultural and architectural heritage. Some of the main points of interest include:

- The Municipal Hall of Molenbeek, located on the Place Communale/Gemeenteplein, designed in eclectic style by the architect Jean-Baptiste Janssens, which was opened in 1889.
- The Church of St. John the Baptist, a Catholic parish church designed in Art Deco style by the architect Joseph Diongre and built in 1931–32, which has been listed as a protected monument since 1984.
- The Church of St. Remigius, located on the Boulevard du Jubilé/Jubelfeestlaan, a neo-Gothic building completed in 1907.
- The Church of St. Barbara, located on the Place de la Duchesse de Brabant/Hertogin van Brabantplein, another neo-Gothic building completed in 1894 and listed since 1998.
- Molenbeek Cemetery, which contains remarkable monuments, including funerary galleries and a columbarium built in 1880.
- Karreveld Castle and its surrounding park, which are used for cultural events and meetings of the municipal council. At the beginning of the 20th century, it was one of the birthplaces of Belgian cinema. At the request of Charles Pathé (Pathé Cinémas), the French director Alfred Machin established the country's first film studio there, consisting of glazed sheds with offices, dressing rooms, workshops for set construction, as well as a small menagerie of exotic animals, such as bears, camels and two panthers, for use as 'extras' in films. Some twenty early Belgian feature films, including Saïda a enlevé Manneken-Pis, La Fille de Delft and Maudite soit la guerre (in hand-painted colours), were shot and produced there. Since 1999, the castle hosts from mid-July to September the Festival Bruxellons!, a theatre festival open to other performing arts (i.e. magic, music, circus, etc.).
- The Municipal Museum of Molenbeek (MoMuse), housed in the prestigious building of the Academy of Drawing and Visual Arts.
- The Jubilee Bridge, designed in 1904 by the engineer Frédéric Bruneel, which connects the Boulevard du Jubilé to the Boulevard Émile Bockstael/Emile Bockstaellaan over Tour & Taxis Park.
- The monument dedicated to the heroes of the First World War, designed by the sculptor Georges Vandevoorde and the architect Lucien François, and completed in 1925–26. It is located in the centre of the Square des Libérateurs/Bevrijderssquare, along the Boulevard du Jubilé.
- The Vaartkapoen statue, designed by the sculptor Tom Frantzen in 1985, on the Place Sainctelette/Sainctelettesquare.

Moreover, several rundown industrial buildings have been renovated and converted into prime real estate and other community functions. Examples include:

- The Fonderie, a former smelter of the Compagnie des Bronzes de Bruxelles, operational from 1854 to 1979, now home to the Brussels Museum of Industry and Labour. The museum focuses on the industry, coupled with the social history of Molenbeek, and the impact of industrialisation on the development of the municipality.
- The Raffinerie, a former sugar refinery, now the site of a cultural and modern dance complex.
- The Bottelarij, a bottling plant that housed the Royal Flemish Theatre during its renovation in the centre of Brussels.
- The Millennium Iconoclast Museum of Art (MIMA), a museum dedicated to culture 2.0 and to urban art opened in April 2016, in the former buildings of the Belle-Vue brewery, and is the first of the kind in Europe.
- The impressive buildings of the former goods station of Tour & Taxis and the surrounding area bordering the municipality, which are being turned into residences, as well as commercial enterprises.
- Brussels' Circus School, installed in the buildings of Tour & Taxis.
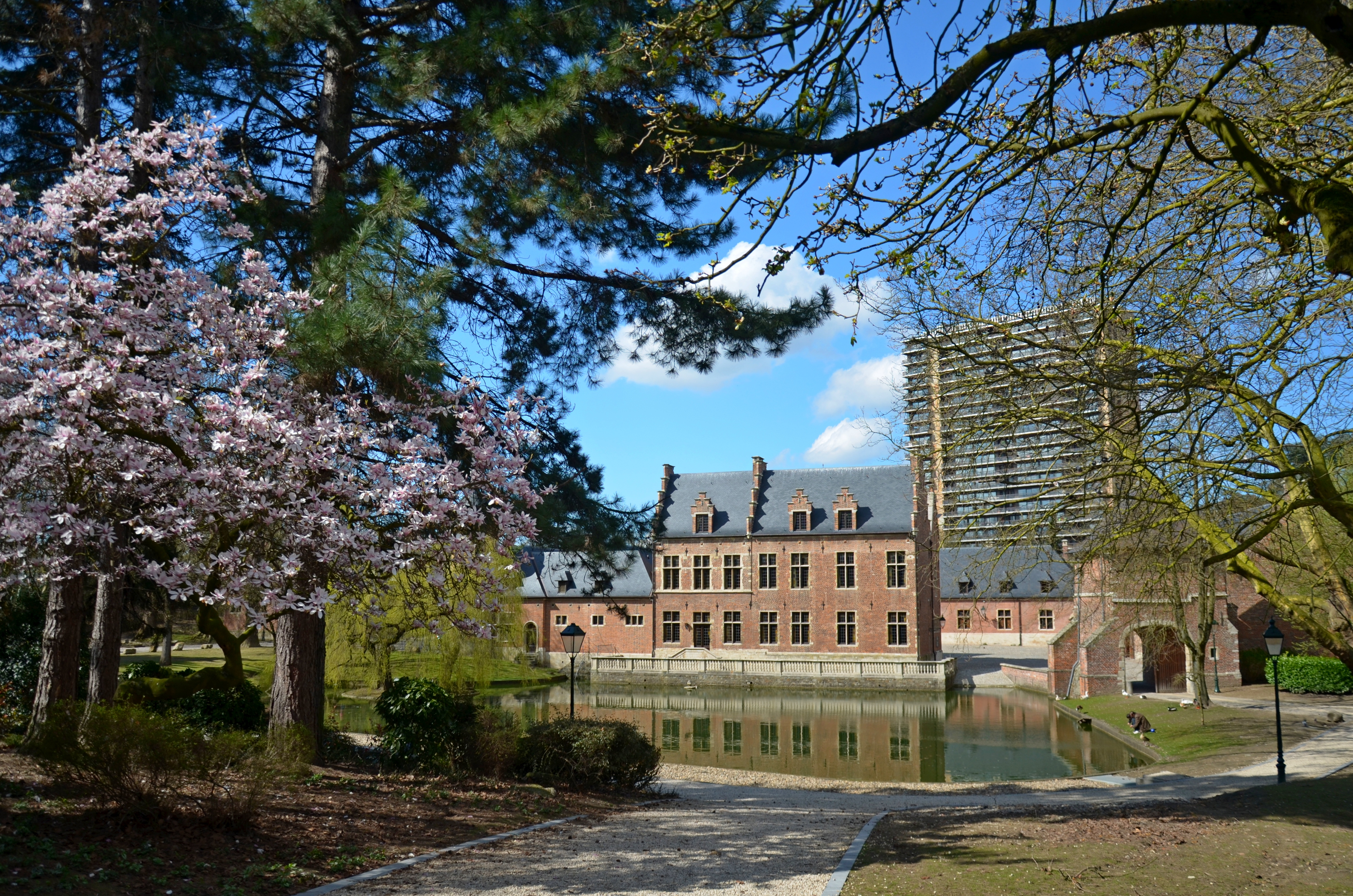
Karreveld Castle

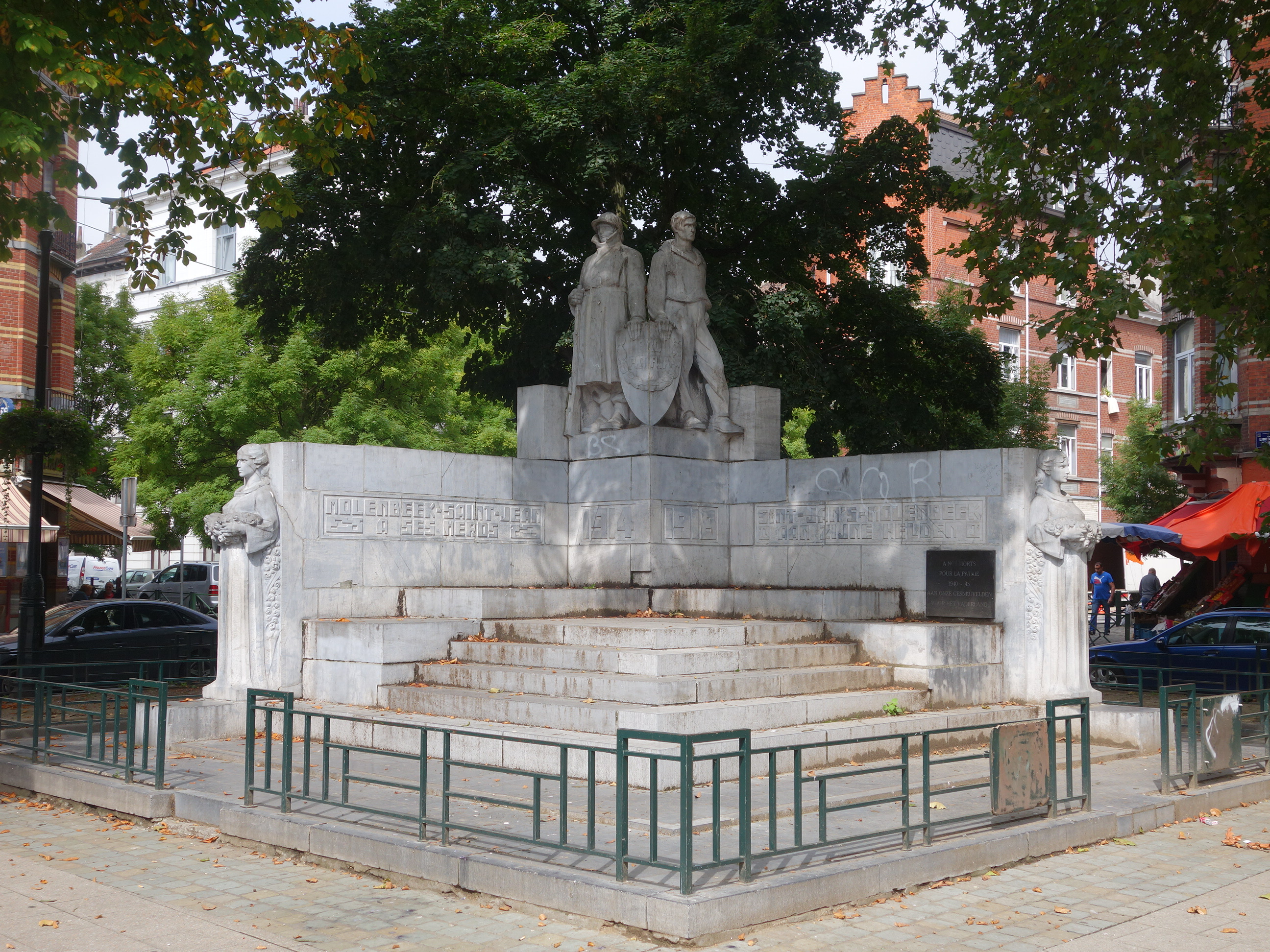
World War I memorial on the Square des Libérateurs/Bevrijderssquare

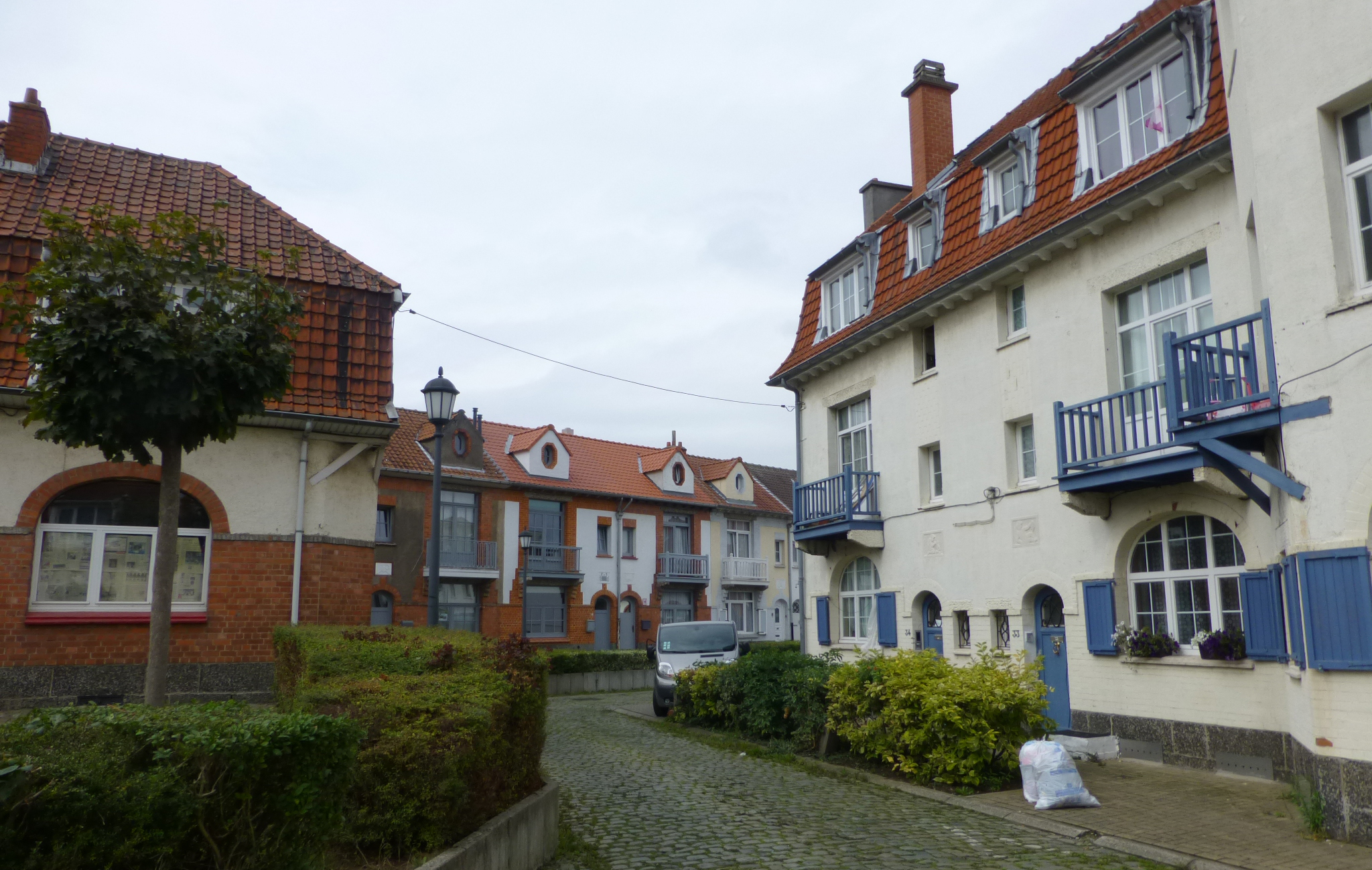
Diongre garden city

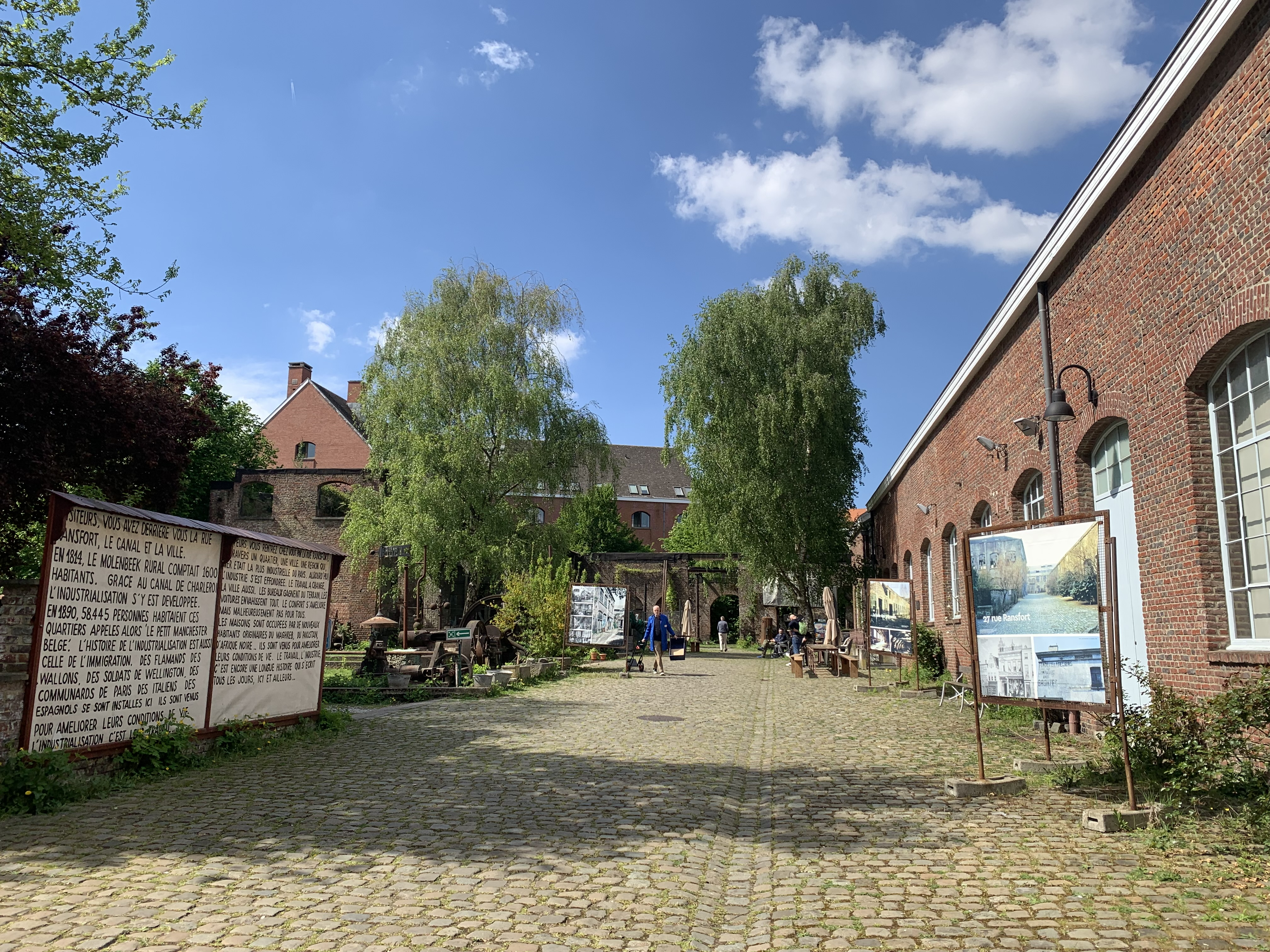
The Fonderie, Brussels' Museum of Industry and Labour

== Demographics ==
=== Historical population ===
Historically, the population of Molenbeek was quite low. The municipality counted 690 inhabitants in 1707 and fewer than 2,000 inhabitants at the beginning of the 19th century. However, following the Industrial Revolution, the population underwent a remarkable growth, peaking at 72,783 in 1910. From then, it began to decrease slightly during the first half of the 20th century to a low of 63,528 in 1961, before increasing again rapidly in recent years.

As of 1 January 2024, the population was 98,365. The area is 6.02 km^{2} (2.32 sq mi), making the density 16,352/km^{2} (42,350/sq mi). The population is relatively young—the average age is 35 years—with nearly 29% under 18 years old, and fewer than 12% over 65. This population, while already impoverished and overcrowded, further increased by 24.5% between 2005 and 2015.

- Sources: INS: 1806 to 1981 = census; 1990 and later = population on 1 January

=== Foreign population ===
Largest groups of foreign residents (2020)
Country	Population
Morocco	5,960
Romania	4,242
Spain	2,255
France	1,956
Italy	1,759
Syria	1,666
Poland	1,040

The population has been described as "mainly Muslim" in the media; however, actual figures are estimated to range between 25% and 40%, depending on the catchment area. Belgium does not collect statistics by religious beliefs, so exact figures are unknown, but the Muslim minority in the community is visibly significant.

As of 2016, there is one main minority group in Molenbeek, Belgian Moroccans (mainly Riffian and other Berbers). That year, Françoise Schepmans, then-mayor of Molenbeek, stated that the lack of diversity in the foreign population of Molenbeek and the fact they are all clustered in the same area is a problem. Nearly 40% of young people in Molenbeek are unemployed. The municipality lies in a semi-circle of neighbourhoods in Brussels often referred to as the "poor croissant".

As of 2023, taking into account the nationality of birth of the parents, 69.16% of Molenbeek's population is of non-European origin (predominantly Moroccan and Syrian), 17.49% of European origin other than Belgian (mainly Romanian, Spanish, French, Italian, and Polish), while 13.31% is solely of native Belgian ancestry. Among all major migrant groups from outside the EU, a majority of the permanent residents have acquired Belgian nationality.

Group of origin	Year	
Group of origin	2023	
Group of origin	Number	%
Belgians with Belgian background	13,083	13.31%
Belgians with foreign background	56,630	57.63%
Neighbouring country	1,873	1.91%
EU27 (excluding neighbouring country)	3,338	3.4%
Outside EU 27	51,419	52.32%
Non-Belgians	28,557	29.06%
Neighbouring country	2,301	2.34%
EU27 (excluding neighbouring country)	9,709	9.88%
Outside EU 27	16,547	16.84%
Total	98,270	100%

== Politics ==
Molenbeek is governed by an elected municipal council and an executive college of the mayor and aldermen. The longtime mayor from 1992 to 2012 was Philippe Moureaux (PS). Following the Belgian local elections, 2012, an alternative majority was formed headed by then-mayor Françoise Schepmans (MR) and consisting of MR (15 seats), CDH-CD&V (6 seats) and Ecolo-Groen (4 seats). The Socialist Party (16 seats) became the opposition next to the Workers' Party of Belgium (PTB), Democratic Federalist Independent (DéFI), the ISLAM party and the New Flemish Alliance (N-VA), each having one seat.

The 2018 local elections saw PS return to the majority, with a coalition between the aforementioned and MR being agreed upon. The current mayor is Catherine Moureaux.

Molenbeek-Saint-Jean local election – 14 October 2018
Party
Party	Votes	%	Swing (pp)	Elected 2018	Change
PS – sp.a	12,122	31.34	▲2.16	17 / 45 (38%)	▲1
MR – Open Vld	9,268	23.96	▼3.37	13 / 45 (29%)	▼2
PVDA-PTB	5,262	13.61	▲9.09	7 / 45 (16%)	▲6
cdH – CD&V	3,246	8.39	▼3.22	3 / 45 (7%)	▼3
Ecolo	3,163	8.18	▼0.88	3 / 45 (7%)	▼1
DéFI	1,842	4.76	▲0.29	1 / 45 (2%)	Steady
N-VA	1,307	3.38	▼0.62	1 / 49 (2%)	Steady
Groen	940	2.43	New	0 / 49 (0%)	-
Molenbeek Act	734	1.90	New	0 / 45 (0%)	-
ISLAM	695	1.80	▼2.32	0 / 45 (0%)	▼1
CITOYEN D'EUROPE M3E	95	0.25	New	0 / 45 (0%)	-

=== Mayors ===
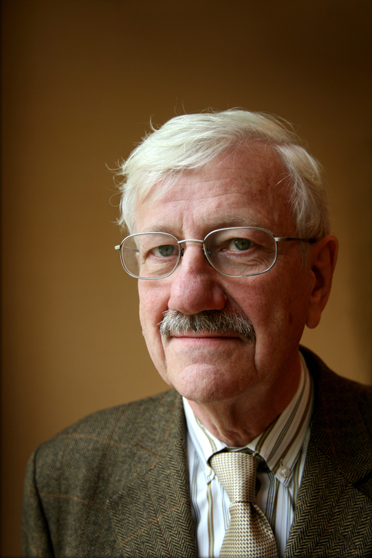
Philippe Moureaux was mayor of Molenbeek from 1992 until 2012.

Historical list of mayors or burgomasters of Molenbeek:

==== Pre-independence (before 1830) ====
- 1800–1812: J.-B. De Roy
- 1812–1818: FR. De Putte
- 1818–1819: V. Van Espen
- 1819–1830: F. Vanderdussen

==== Kingdom of Belgium (1830–present) ====
Name	Start date	End date	Length	Political Party
Charles De Roy	1830	1836	6 years	
Pierre-Joseph Meeûs	1836	1842	6 years	
Albert Vanderkindere	1843	1848	5 years	
H.-J.-L. Stevens	1848	1860	12 years	
J.-B. Debauche	1861	1863	2 years	
L.-A. De Cock	1864	1875	11 years	
Guillaume Mommaerts	1876	1878	2 years	
Henri Hollevoet	1879	1911	32 years	Liberal
Julien Hanssens	1912	1914	2 years	Liberal
Louis Mettewie	1914	1938	24 years	Liberal
Edmond Machtens	1938	1978	40 years	PSB
Marcel Piccart	1978	1989	11 years	PS
Marcel Piccart	1978	1989	11 years	FDF
Léon Spiegels	1989	1992	3 years	PRL
Philippe Moureaux	1992	2012	20 years	PS
Françoise Schepmans	2012	2018	6 years	MR
Catherine Moureaux	2018	Present	Ongoing	PS

== Sports ==
As in the rest of Brussels, sport in Molenbeek is under the responsibility of the Communities. The Administration de l'Éducation Physique et du Sport (ADEPS) is responsible for recognising the various French-speaking sports federations. Its Dutch-speaking counterpart is Sport Vlaanderen (formerly called BLOSO).

=== Football ===
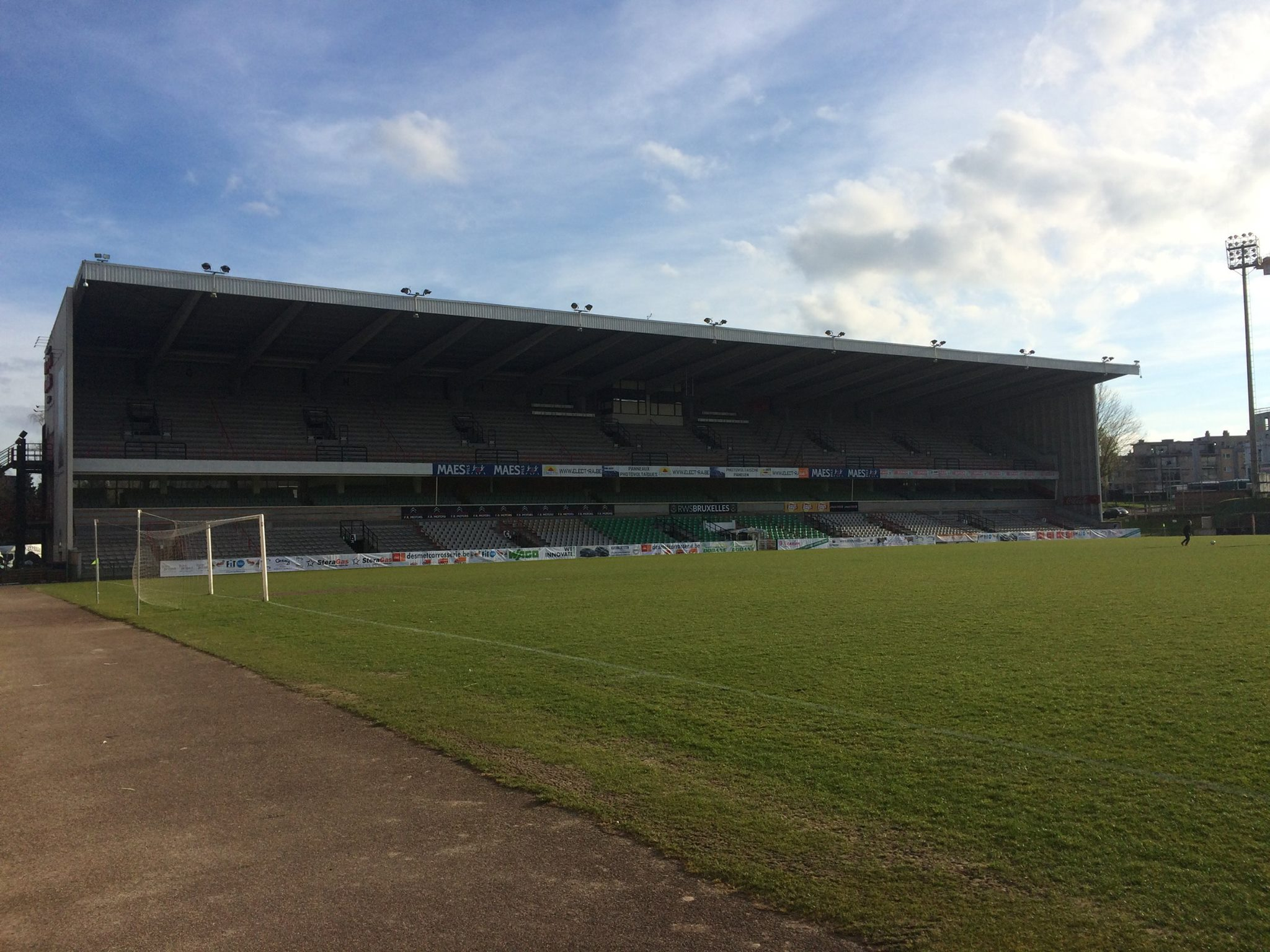
Edmond Machtens Stadium

Molenbeek's historical football club, Racing White Daring Molenbeek, often referred to as RWDM, was very popular until its dissolution in 2002. Its successor, R.W.D.M. Brussels F.C., used to play in the Belgian first division. It folded at the end of 2012–13 as a member of the Belgian Second Division. Since 2023, its reincarnation, RWDM47, is back playing in the first division. The club's home stadium is the Edmond Machtens Stadium.

=== Other sports ===
The municipality is home to the Royal Daring Hockey Club Molenbeek, a field hockey club.

== Education ==
Most of Molenbeek pupils between the ages of 3 and 18 go to schools organised by the French-speaking Community or the Flemish Community.

=== Primary education ===
There are 17 French-language and six Dutch-language primary schools in Molenbeek.

=== Secondary education ===
- Athénée royal Serge Creuz (French-speaking)
- Athaneum Toverfluit (Dutch-speaking)

== Transport ==
=== Road network ===
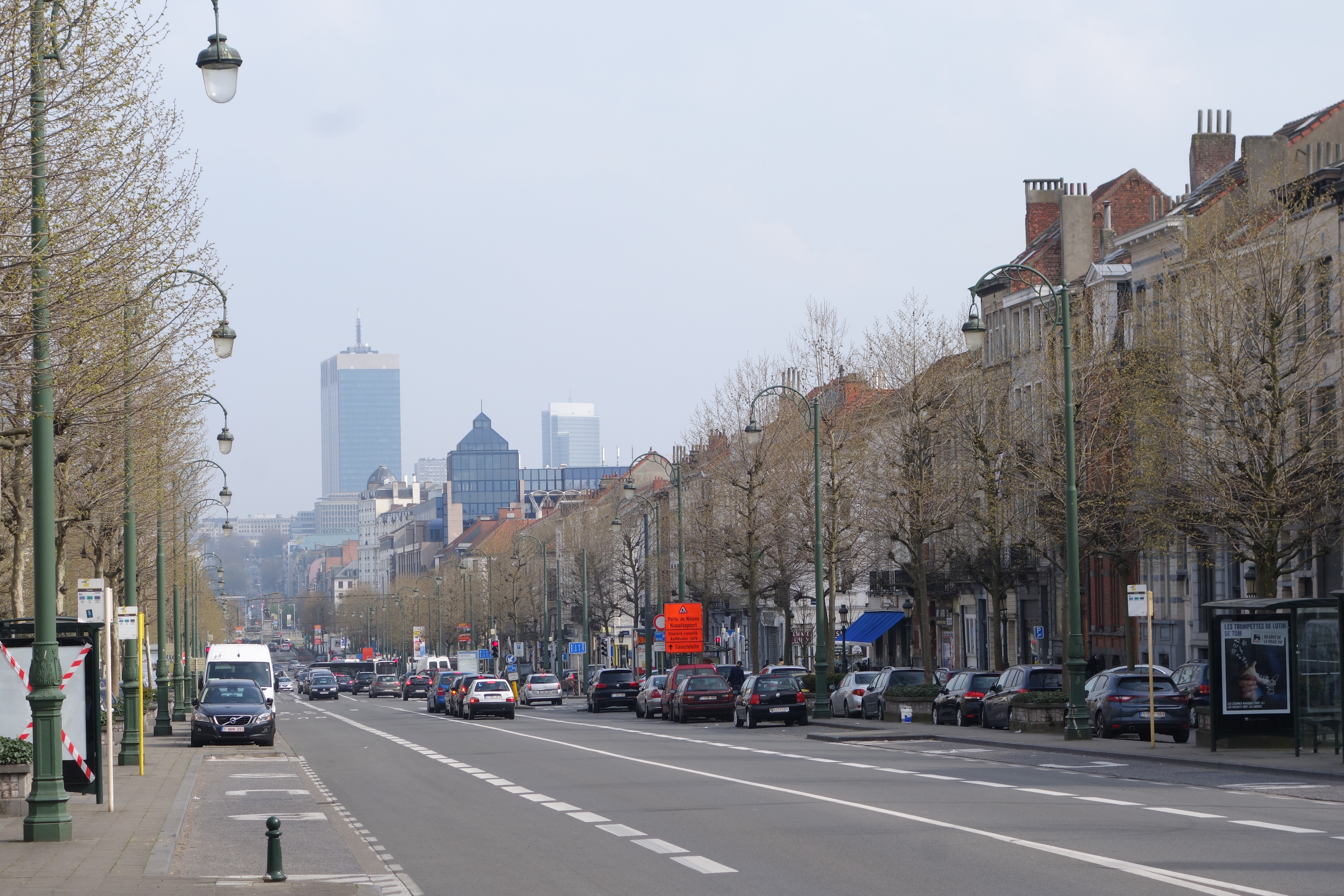
Boulevard Léopold II/Leopold II-laan

The Boulevard Léopold II/Leopold II-laan in the north of Molenbeek is part of a monumental east–west axis, at the end of which is the National Basilica of the Sacred Heart in Koekelberg. Some other main roads that cross the municipality are the Chaussée de Gand/Gentsesteenweg, the Boulevard Edmond Machtens/Edmond Machtenslaan and the Chaussée de Ninove/Ninoofsesteenweg running east–west, as well as the Boulevard Louis Mettewie/Louis Mettewielaan running north–south.

=== Public transport ===
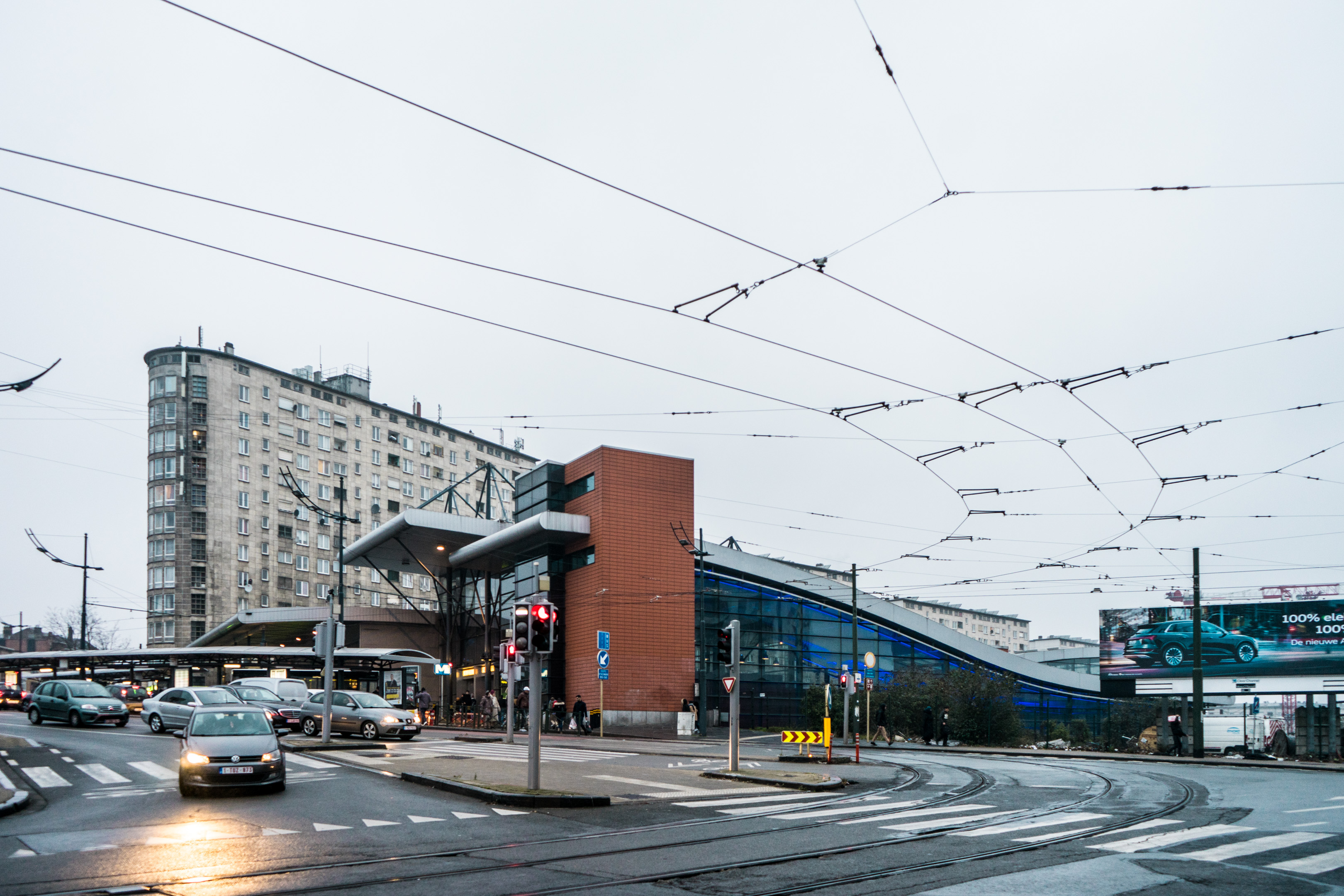
Brussels-West Station is a multimodal transport hub in western Brussels

Molenbeek is served by Brussels' metro lines 1, 2, 5 and 6, with Comte de Flandre/Graaf van Vlaanderen, Étangs Noirs/Zwarte Vijvers, Osseghem/Ossegem, Belgica, Beekkant, Gare de l'Ouest/Weststation (Brussels-West Station), and Ribaucourt stations. Brussels-West and Beekkant are connected to all the metro lines and are multimodal transport hubs in western Brussels. The former will also gain importance in the framework of the Brussels Regional Express Network (RER/GEN)'s development, which will connect the capital and surrounding towns. Additionally, a comprehensive bus and tram service links Molenbeek to other parts of the region. The municipality also has a number Villo! public bicycle stations on its territory.

=== Waterways ===
Molenbeek is on the route of the second largest axis of the Belgian network of inland waterways, that is the Antwerp–Brussels–Charleroi axis via the maritime Scheldt, the Maritime Canal and the Brussels–Charleroi Canal.

== Parks and green spaces ==
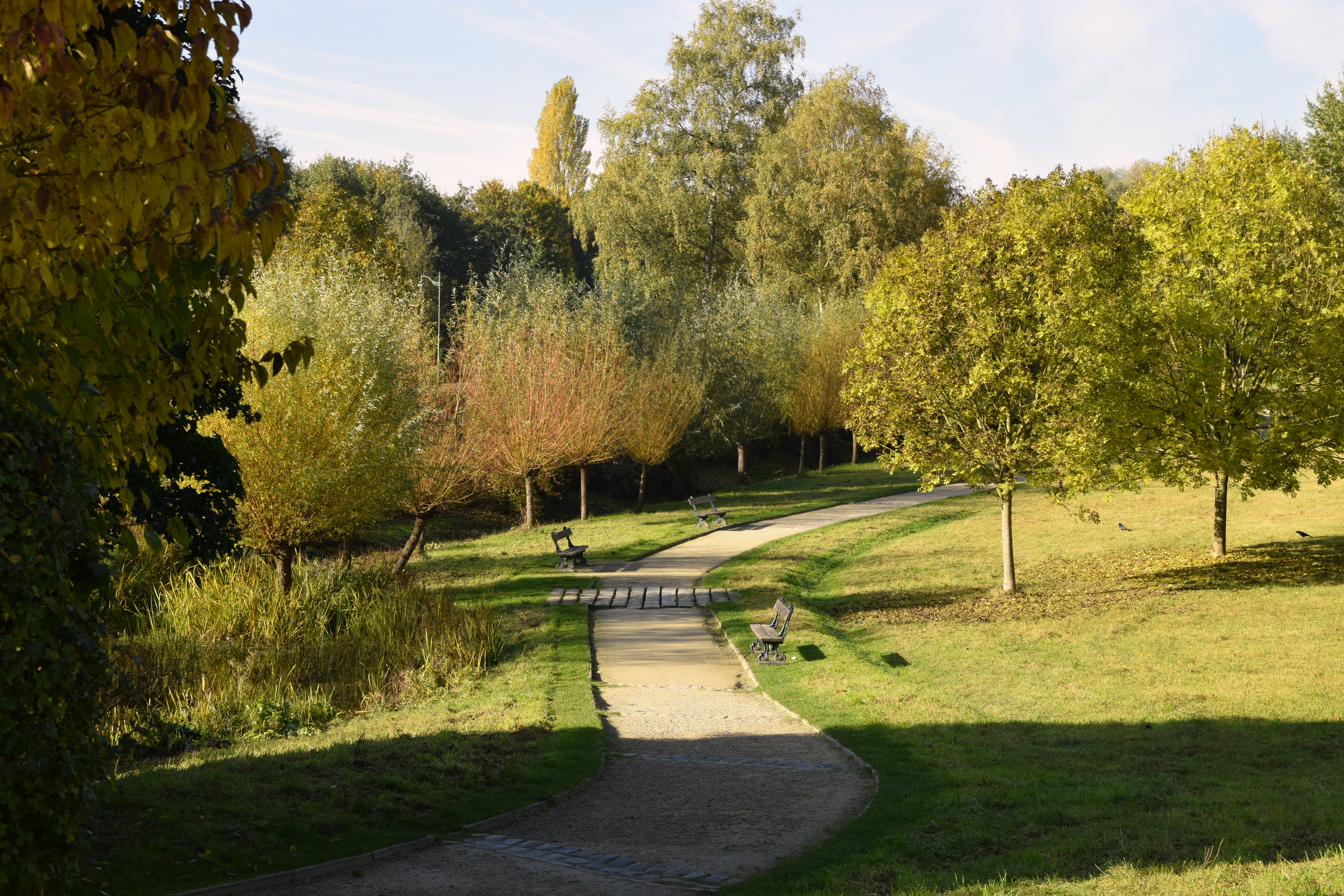
Scheutbos regional nature park

Green spaces in the municipality include:

- Scheutbos Park, a regional nature park of 6 ha (15 acres)
- Semi-natural site of the Scheutbos, a protected area of 44 ha (110 acres)
- Karreveld Park 3 ha (7.4 acres)
- Marie-José Park 6 ha (15 acres)
- Albert Park
- Muses' Park
- Hauwaert Park
- Bonnevie Park
- Fonderie Park

== Notable inhabitants ==
- Abdelhamid Abaaoud (1987–2015), French jihadist terrorist involved in the November 2015 Paris attacks
- Salah Abdeslam (born 1989), French jihadist terrorist involved in the November 2015 Paris attacks
- Montasser AlDe'emeh (born 1989), Belgian-Palestinian researcher
- Richard Beauthier (1913–1999), politician, senator, and mayor of Jette, was born there.
- Norbert Benoit (Norbert Benoit Van Peperstaete) (1910–1993), filmmaker
- Louis Bertrand (1856–1943), politician, author, and Minister of State
- Ado Chale (born 1928), artist
- Serge Creuz (1924–1996), painter
- Jean de la Hoese (1846–1917), painter
- Jean De Middeleer (1908–1986), musician
- Eugène Demolder (1862–1919), writer
- Joseph Diongre (1878–1963), modernist architect
- Alfred Dubois (1898–1949), professor at the Brussels Conservatory, violinist, and teacher of the violinist Arthur Grumiaux
- Alexis Dumont (1877–1962), architect of the Citroën building (now part of KANAL – Centre Pompidou)
- Ferdinand Elbers (1862–1943), mechanic, trade unionist, politician, and senator
- Hendrik Fayat (1906–1997), politician, Minister of European Affairs, and Minister of Foreign Affairs
- Henri Hollevoet (1833–1911), politician and mayor of Molenbeek
- Eugene Hins (1839–1923), founder of the newspaper La Pensée, leader of the Belgian freethinking movement, and co-founder of the Socialist International
- Marcel Josz (1899–1984), actor
- Eugène Laermans (1864–1940), painter and engraver
- Daniel Leyniers, Esq. (1881–1957), politician, senator, and mayor of Itterbeek, was born there.
- Edmond Machtens (1902–1978), politician and mayor of Molenbeek
- Marka, Serge Van Laeken (born 1961), singer, songwriter, composer, and filmmaker
- Pierre-Joseph Meeûs (1793–1873), industrialist, politician, mayor of Neder-over-Heembeek and Molenbeek, and registrar of the Court of Audit. He lived at 7, faubourg de Flandre.
- Louis Mettewie (1855–1942), politician and mayor of Molenbeek
- Henry Meuwis (1870–1935), painter
- Georges Mogin, also known as Norge (1898–1990), poet
- Philippe Moureaux (1939–2018), politician, senator, mayor of Molenbeek, and Professor of Economic History at the Université libre de Bruxelles (ULB)
- Michel Mourlon (1845–1915), geologist, palaeontologist, and curator of the Museum of Natural Sciences of Belgium
- Jean Muno (1924–1988), writer
- Gabrielle Petit (1893–1916), spy and World War I martyr
- Zeynep Sever (born 1989), Miss Belgium 2008
- Robert Schuiten (1912–1997), architect and painter
- Shay (born 1992), rapper
- Jean Stampe (1889–1978), war pilot and aircraft manufacturer, including of the Stampe SV-4
- Reimond Stijns (1850–1905), writer
- Eric Struelens (born 1969), professional basketball player
- Herman Teirlinck (1879–1967), writer
- Isidoor Teirlinck (1851–1934), writer
- Pierre Tetar van Elven (1828–1908), painter
- Toots Thielemans (1922–2016), jazz musician
- Henri Joseph Thomas (1878–1972), painter
- Pierre Van Humbeeck (1829–1890), politician and Minister of Education
- Leon Vanderkindere (1842–1906), historian and professor at the Free University of Brussels
- Philippe Vandermaelen (1795–1869), geographer and cartographer. He founded the geographical establishment of Brussels in Molenbeek.
- Franky Vercauteren (born 1956), football personality
- Firmin Verhevick (1874–1962), painter
- Thierry Zéno (1950–2017), author-filmmaker

== International relations ==
=== Twin towns and sister cities ===
Molenbeek is twinned with:

- Oujda, Morocco
- Levallois-Perret, France
