= Montasser AlDe'emeh =

Belgian academic

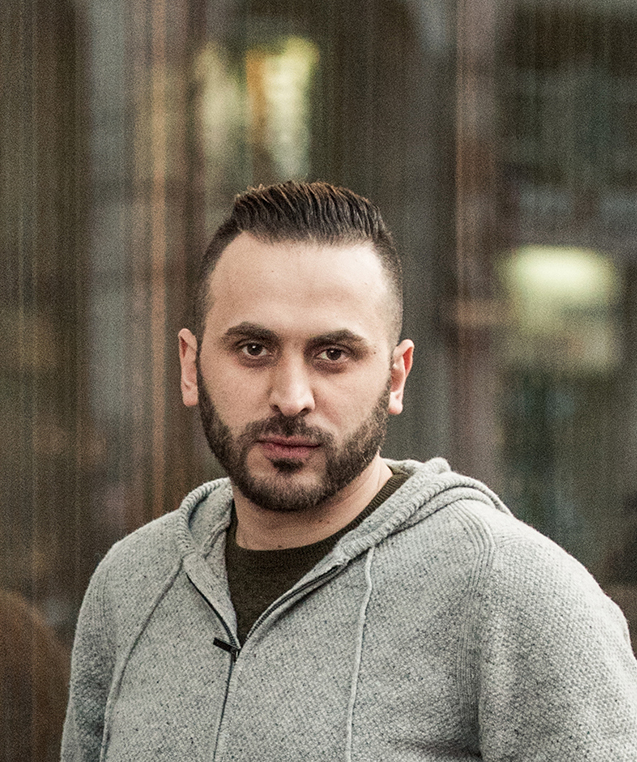
- Born: April 8, 1989; Russeifa, Jordan
- Other name: "Monty"
- Education: KU Leuven (BA, 2011); KU Leuven (MA, 2012); SOAS University of London (PgD, 2020); Trinity College Dublin (MPhil, 2025); KU Leuven (PhD, 2026)
- Occupation: Academic
- Website: montasser.be

Montasser AlDe'emeh (Arabic: مُنْتَصِر يُوسُف عَلِيّ الدَّعْمِيّ, romanized: Muntaṣir Yūsuf ʿAliyy ad-Daʿmiyy; Jordan, April 8, 1989) is a Belgian-Palestinian academic.

== Biography ==
Montasser's parents and grandparents were both born in Mandatory Palestine. In 1948, his family fled from Sabbarin, a village in the subdistrict of Haifa that was depopulated and destroyed during the Nakba. The family ended up in the Nur Shams and Far'a refugee camps, in the northern part of the West Bank. During the Six-Day War in 1967, his family fled to Jordan. Montasser Alde'emeh was born in a Palestinian refugee camp in Russeifa, near Zarqa, which was at the time a stronghold of Palestinian commandos, known as the Palestinian fedayeen. In the early 1990s, the AlDe'emeh family moved to a poor neighbourhood in Molenbeek-Saint-Jean, before later relocating to Asse in Flemish Brabant and eventually settling in Baardegem, East Flanders, where Montasser grew up as a child.

During the Second Intifada, one of his cousins was shot dead by Israeli soldiers while returning from the Arab American University of Jenin. In February 2024, another cousin was killed by the Israeli military. He was an officer in the security services of the Palestinian Authority and was buried with military honours.

== Education ==
In 2011, Montasser graduated cum laude from the KU Leuven with a Bachelor of Arts degree in Language and Area Studies: Arabic and Islamic studies. In 2012, Montasser obtained a master's degree in Language and Area studies: Arabic and Islamic Studies (Magna cum laude) from the same university. During the academic year 2019/20, he continued his studies and research in the United Kingdom, where he obtained a postgraduate diploma with distinction from SOAS University of London. In 2025, he was awarded a Master of Philosophy with distinction from Trinity College Dublin. On 20 October 2026, he successfully defended his PhD dissertation at KU Leuven.

== Career ==
=== Anti-Radicalisation ===
Immediately following the 2016 Brussels attacks, Montasser started to work with Scholengroep Brussel (2016–2022), schools organised by the Flemish Community in Brussels, as the head of deradicalisation, a job that he also performed for VCLB Pieter Breughel for three school years and for GO! CLB Brussel during one year.

=== Research ===
At KU Leuven and Ghent University, he is conducting research into Islamic State-affiliated groups and foreign fighters in the Syrian Civil War and War in Iraq. During his doctoral study, he went to Syria to interview fighters from the Al-Nusra Front. In Syria, he got arrested, and interrogated by Al-Nusra. AlDe’emeh tries to help young people turn away from radical ideology. AlDe'emeh tried to stop Abdelmalek Boutalliss, a young ISIS fighter, from blowing himself up in Iraq. In 2017, he embedded further field research in Kirkuk, Iraq; here he followed the Patriotic Union of Kurdistan Peshmerga fighters led by the Kurdish general Wasta Rasul, during their battles with ISIS at the frontline. In 2019, he visited the Gweran Prison in Al-Hasakah, where he interviewed Islamic State of Iraq and the Levant prisoners. On 20 October 2026, AlDe'emeh successfully defended his doctoral dissertation at KU Leuven. His research examined the interpretation and use of Qur'anic verses by Dutch-speaking Salafi-jihadist ideological producers in Belgium and the Netherlands between 2010 and March 2019. It focused on three concepts central to Salafi-jihadist thought: tawhid (the oneness of God), al-wala' wal-bara' (loyalty and disavowal), and armed jihad. The study compared these interpretations with the broader Islamic exegetical tradition (tafsir), examining how the producers drew on classical Qur'anic exegesis while applying verses to contemporary political and ideological contexts.

== Views ==
AlDe’emeh believes that exposure to a more sophisticated study of Islam can help some of those recruited by armed groups rethink their fanatical views. He believes there are two profiles of jihadists: the naive idealists and the more violent extremists prepared to strike in their homeland. In January 2024, AlDe'emeh stated that Islamic State cells are still active in Syria and Iraq. However, he pointed out that the group has many local enemies. In Syria, these include Shia militias, the Lebanese Hezbollah, Tahrir al-Sham, Syrian rebel groups supported by Turkey, the Syrian Democratic Forces (SDF), Sunni Arab tribes, Assad's forces and militias affiliated with them, in addition to the international coalition, Arab countries such as United Arab Emirates, Saudi Arabia and Jordan, as well as Russia.

== Works ==
His 2015 co-written highly-acclaimed book De Jihadkaravaan. Reis naar de wortels van de haat (The Jihad Caravan. A Journey to the Roots of Hatred), was nominated for the Brusseprijs 2016 (award for the best journalistic book in Dutch). The book includes AlDe’emeh's interviews with Western jihadists in Syria. He has also authored scientific publications, including "Tawhid and shirk in Salafi-jihadist Discourse in the Netherlands and Belgium: An Interpretation of ‘Persecution is Worse than Killing’ from Q 2:191 by Dutch-speaking European Ideological Actors", which was published in August 2026 in The Journal of Muslims in Europe (Brill Publishers).
