= Jean de la Hoese =

Belgian painter

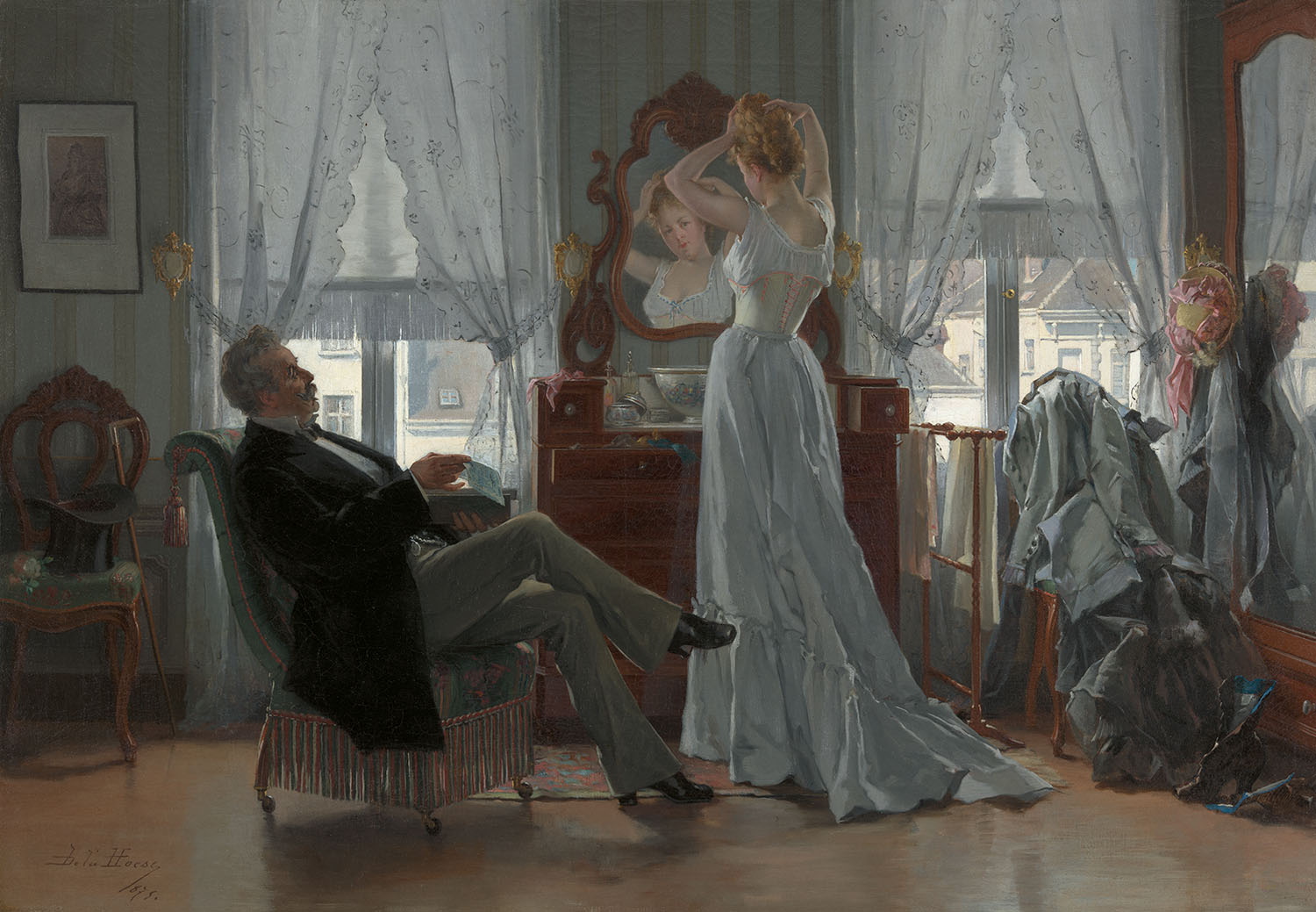
Jean de la Hoese, Le Billet de faveur (Berko Fine Paintings)

Jean de la Hoese (1846, in Molenbeek-Saint-Jean – 1917, in Saint-Josse-ten-Noode) was a Belgian painter of portraits, landscapes and genre scenes.

== Training and career ==
Jean De la Hoese's father worked as a graphic designer at the Militair Kartografisch Instituut.

Jean De la Hoese was a pupil of Auguste De Keyser (1859) and, from 1859 until 1870, of the Brussels Academy of Fine Arts. His early works were very academic, but later on he evolved to a freer style.

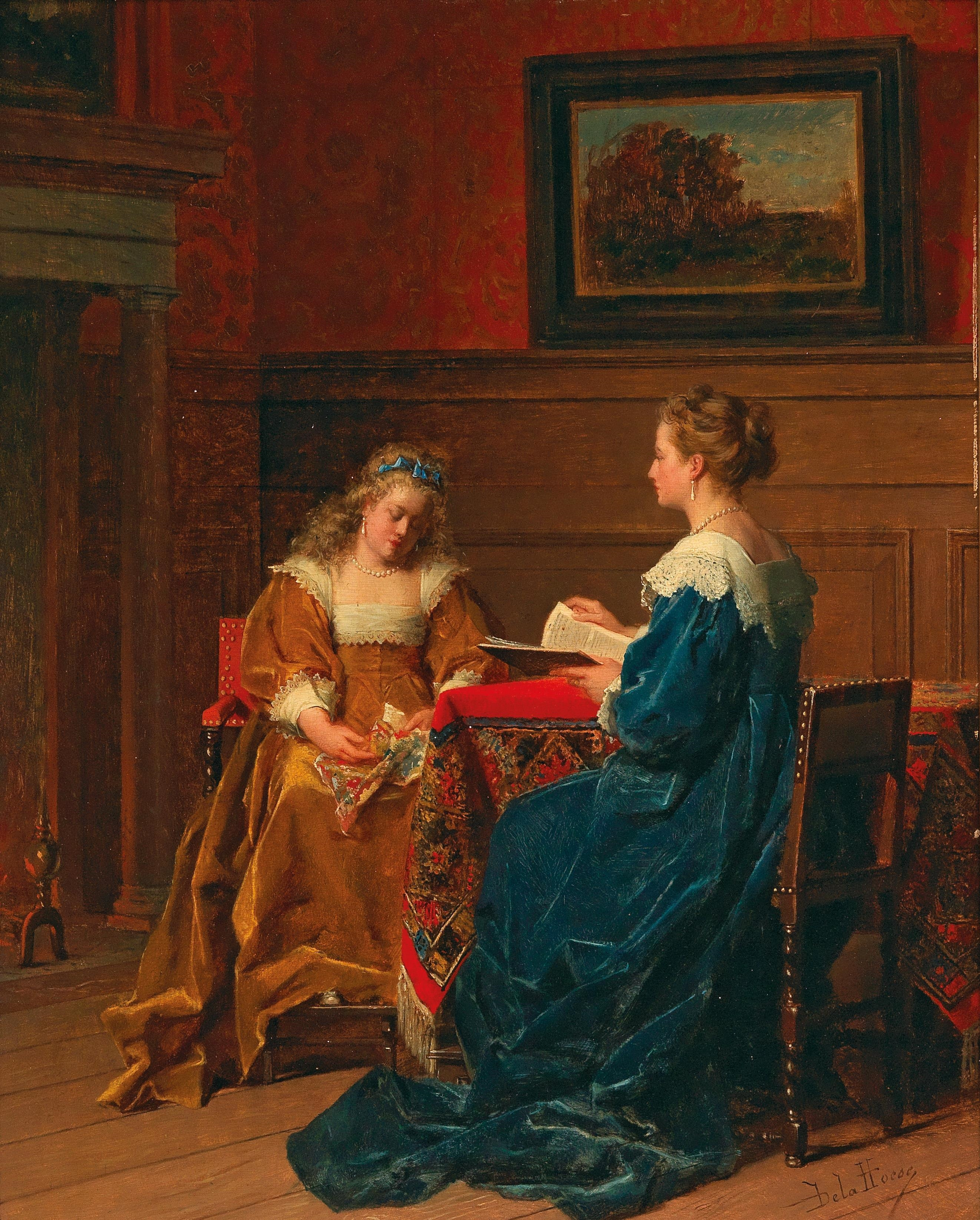
Jean De la Hoese, The Readers

This painter of aristocratic female beauty was a master portrait painter who depicted several masterpieces, including the portrait of his father which is exhibited in the Brussels Royal Museum of Fine Arts.

De la Hoese painted landscapes and genre scenes with elegant ladies in interiors (at the beginning of his career with an emphasis on the representation of fabrics, in the line of Florent Willems). Most of his portraits are presentations of important members of Belgium's higher social classes and highly educated. They express an exceptional unconventional liveliness. The Belgian Government commissioned him to paint the posthumously portrait of Queen Louise-Marie for the Palace of the Nation, the seat of the Belgian Federal Parliament.

Jean De la Hoese lived at 66, rue Potagère/Warmoesstraat in Brussels (Saint-Josse-ten-Noode).

== Exhibitions ==
- 1888: Paris, Exposition Universelle
- 1894: Munich, Glaspalast, World Exposition
- 1907: Paris, Salon d'automne (Portrait of Mrs A. Desenfans, Portrait of Mr Léonce Evrard)
- 1908: Berlin, Exhibition of Belgian Artists (Portrait of the Artist's Father)

== Trivia ==
The street Avenue Jean de la Hoese in Molenbeek-Saint-Jean, Brussels, is named after him.

== Museums ==
- Brussels, Royal Museums of Fine Arts of Belgium
- Brussels, Museum of Ixelles
- Brussels, Charlier Museum
- Gotha, Schlossgalerie (The Visit)
- Leuven, Stedelijk Museum

== Literature ==
- P. & V. Berko, "Dictionary of Belgian Painters born between 1750 and 1875", Knokke 1981, p. 185-186.
- U. Thieme en F. Becker, Allgemeines Lexikon der bildenden Künstler von der Antike bis zur Gegenwart, 17, Leipzig (Seemann Verlag), 1924.
- Le dictionnaire des peintres belges du XIV° siècle à nos jours, Brussels, 1994.
- Eugène De Seyn, Dictionnaire biographique des sciences, des lettres et des arts en Belgique, Tome I, Brussels, 1935, p. 272.
