= William Critchlow Harris =

Canadian architect (1854–1913)

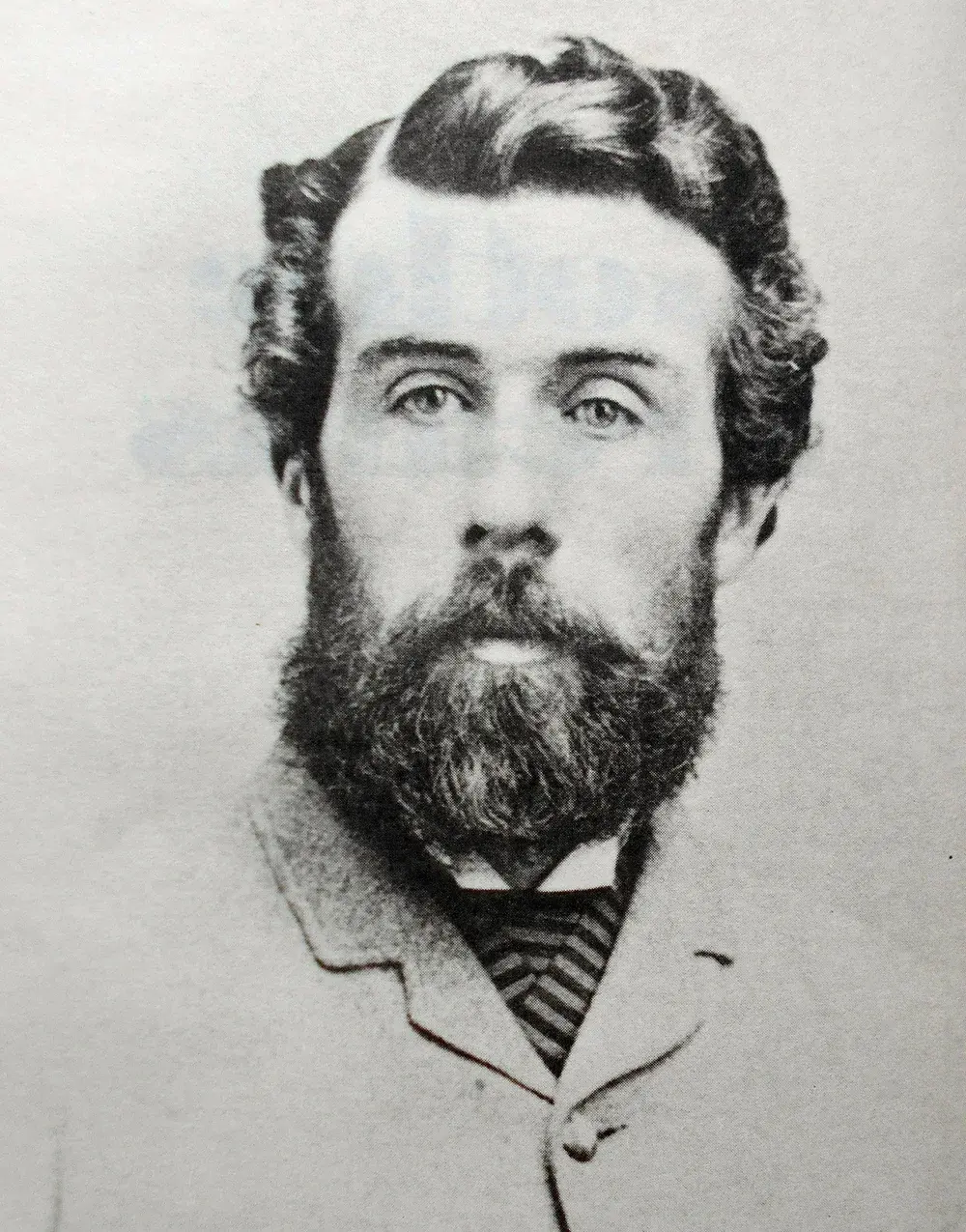
- Born: 30 April 1854; Liverpool, Lancashire, England, UK
- Died: 16 July 1913 (aged 59); Halifax, Nova Scotia, Canada
- Occupation: architect

William Critchlow Harris (30 April 1854 – 16 July 1913) was an English-born Canadian architect, primarily noted for his ecclesiastical and domestic projects in Maritime Canada.

He was born near Liverpool, England, to Welsh parents but moved to Prince Edward Island with his family as a young child. He lived there most of his life; however, for much of the time, he led an itinerant existence, travelling throughout Prince Edward Island, New Brunswick and Nova Scotia, pursuing and executing design commissions across the region. He was influenced by the Richardsonian Romanesque architectural style (for his domestic buildings) and Victorian gothic (for his church designs).

His greatest disappointment was the loss of a commission late in life to design the Anglican Cathedral in Halifax (1905-1910). The commission was awarded to New York City architect Bertram Goodhue, and Harris was given the unhappy task of overseeing the completion of the more famous architect's work.

His brother was the noted artist Robert Harris.

== Notable works ==
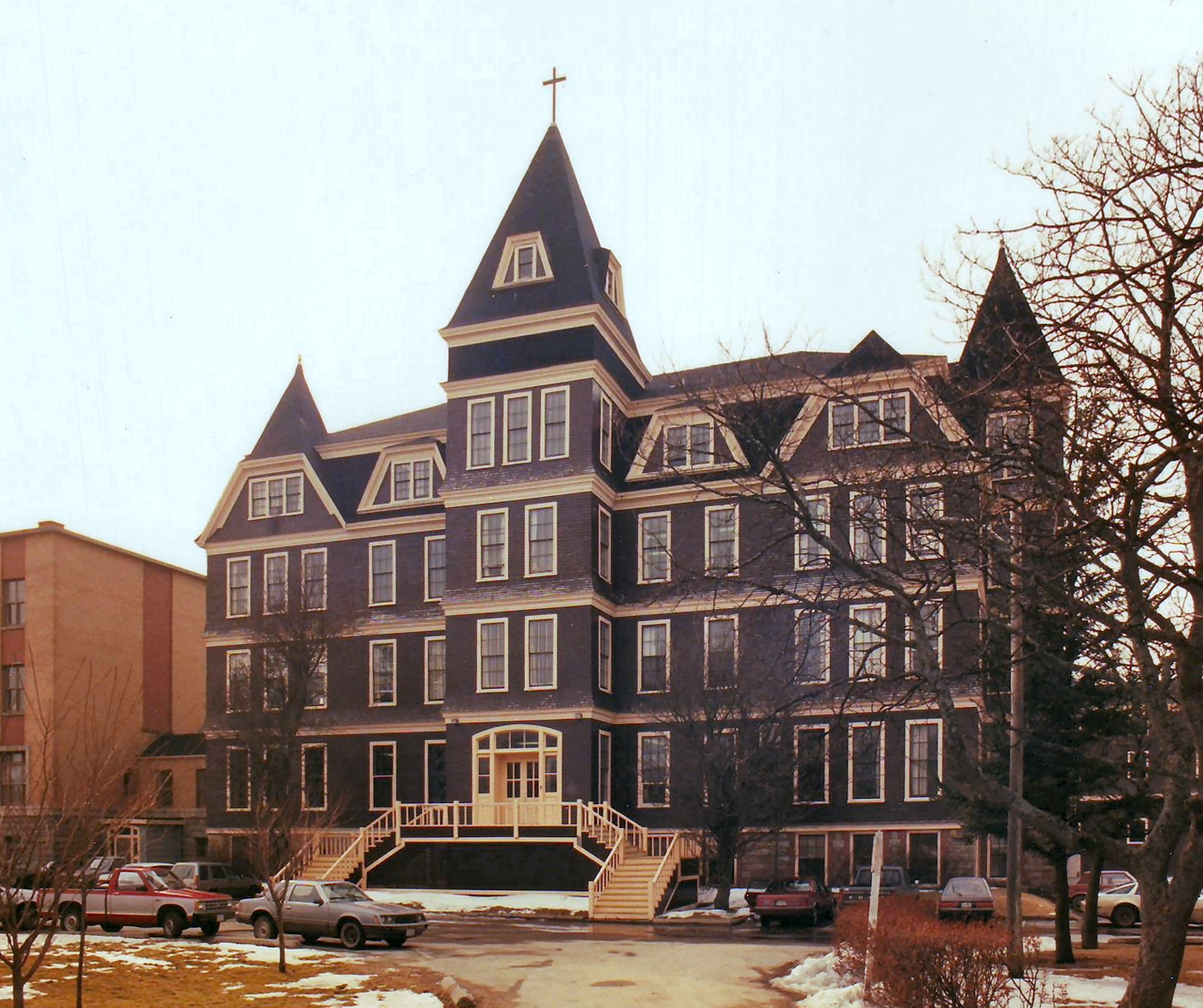
Université Sainte-Anne, Church Point, Nova Scotia

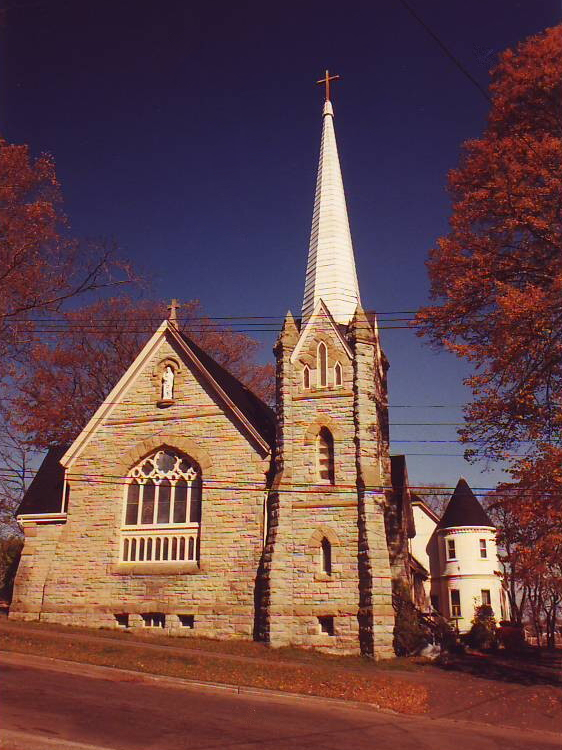
St. John's Church 1898 & rectory 1898 in Windsor, Nova Scotia

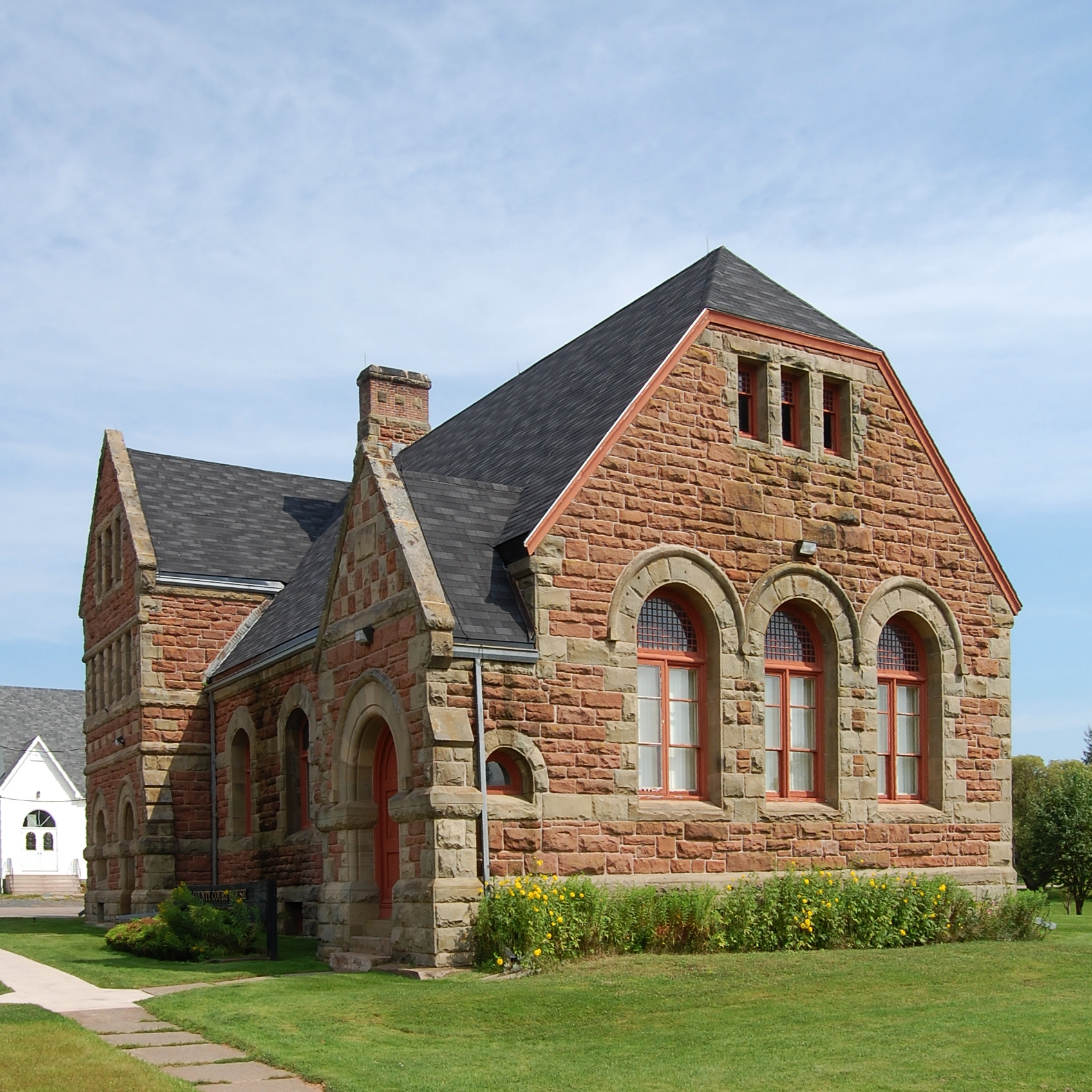
Georgetown, Prince Edward Island Kings County Provincial Court House

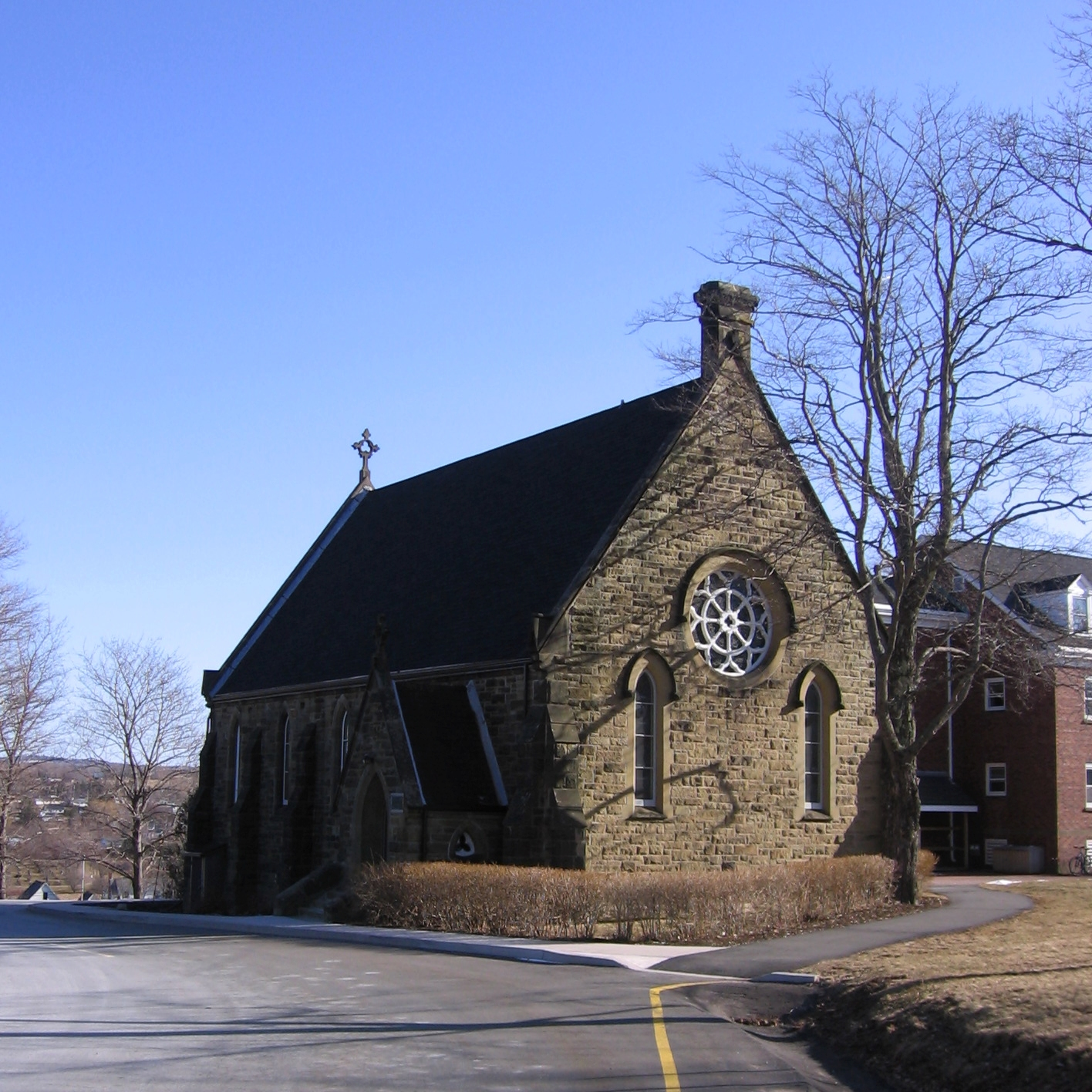
Hensley Chapel Kings Edgehill

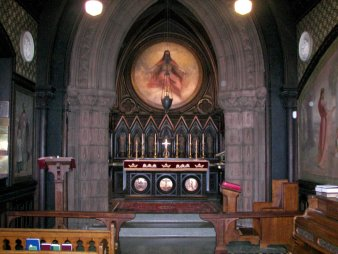
All Souls' Chapel (Prince Edward Island)
- Broughton, Nova Scotia (plan and buildings), Glace Bay, Nova Scotia
- Frederick Borden house, Canning, Nova Scotia
- Elmwood House, Charlottetown, PEI
- St. James Anglican Church, Mahone Bay, Nova Scotia (one of the famous Three Churches)
- St. Mary's Church, Indian River, PEI
- Trinity Anglican Church, Sydney Mines, Nova Scotia (one of only two surviving churches that combines the talents of William and Robert Harris)
