= List of longest church buildings =

This article lists the longest church buildings in the world as measured by various criteria.

== Scope ==
The term church is open to interpretation and debate. However, for the purposes of this article, it will be used to mean any building which was built for the primary purpose of Christian worship, for any recognised denomination of Christianity. This includes all cathedrals (the seat of a bishop), basilicas, and other types of churches. It does not include temples of other religions, e.g. mosques, synagogues. It does include at least one building, Hagia Sophia, which was built as a church but currently operates as a mosque.

== List ==
External length in m	Internal length in m	Nave length in m	Width in m	Name	Denomination	Completion	City	Country	Comment
N/A (underground)	262	89	18	Basílica de la Santa Cruz del Valle de los Caídos	Catholic	1959	Madrid	Spain	
211.5	186.36	91	150	St. Peter's Basilica	Catholic	1506–1626	Vatican City	Vatican City	694 ft
195			150	Yamoussoukro Basilica	Catholic	1990	Yamoussoukro	Ivory Coast	
188.7	146	59	60	Liverpool Cathedral	Anglican	1978	Liverpool	United Kingdom	The total external length, including Lady Chapel, is 188.7 m (619 ft). Its internal length is 146 m (480 ft).
187	?	?	?	Cluny III	Catholic	1130	Cluny	France	90% destroyed during the French Revolution
183.18	?	70	70.7	Cathedral of Saint John the Divine, New York	Anglican	1892 (unfinished)	New York City	United States	
173	168	?	168	Basilica of the National Shrine of Our Lady of Aparecida	Catholic	1955–	Aparecida	Brazil	
170.1	?	?	?	Winchester Cathedral	Anglican	1079 – c. 1400	Winchester	United Kingdom	Longest medieval cathedral still intact
167.8	?	84	58.5	St Albans Cathedral	Anglican	c. 1080–1200	St Albans	United Kingdom	
165	?	75	?	Ely Cathedral	Anglican	c. 1081–1189	Ely	United Kingdom	
161.5	156	?	?	Westminster Abbey	Anglican	c. 1065–1745	London	United Kingdom	
160	?	?	?	Washington National Cathedral	Anglican	1990	Washington, D.C.	United States	
158.50	148.50	?	93	Milan Cathedral	Catholic	1386–1965	Milan	Italy	
158.4	?	?	?	Canterbury Cathedral	Anglican	1077	Canterbury	United Kingdom	
158.10	?	?	75	St Paul's Cathedral	Anglican	1677–1708	London	United Kingdom	
158	?	?	159	York Minster	Anglican	1220–1472	York	United Kingdom	
156.05	?	?	?	Lincoln Cathedral	Anglican	1311	Lincoln	United Kingdom	
153	?	?	90	Florence Cathedral	Catholic	1436	Florence	Italy	
150	131.66	?	80	Basilica of Saint Paul Outside the Walls	Catholic	c. 600	Rome	Italy	
149.17	138.75	?	90	Reims Cathedral	Catholic	1211–1275	Reims	France	
147	?	?	?	Peterborough Cathedral	Anglican	1118–1237	Peterborough	United Kingdom	
145	?	?	70	Amiens Cathedral	Catholic	c. 1300	Amiens	France	
144	136.86	60	61.6	Rouen Cathedral	Catholic	1202	Rouen	France	
143	?	?	?	Durham Cathedral	Anglican	1133	Durham	United Kingdom	
142	?	?	?	Marseille Cathedral	Catholic	1893	Marseille	France	
140.94	?	?	107.8	Basilica of the Sacred Heart	Catholic	1970	Koekelberg	Belgium	
140	?	?	?	Norwich Cathedral	Anglican	1096–1145	Norwich	United Kingdom	
140	?	?	35	Basilica of the National Vow	Catholic	1883–1924	Quito	Ecuador	
150	?	?	73	Basilica of the National Shrine of the Immaculate Conception	Catholic	1919–1961	Washington, D.C.	United States	
139.0	120	?	77.0	Sanctuary of Our Lady of Licheń	Catholic	1994–2004	Licheń Stary	Poland	
134.94	?	58	86.25	Cologne Cathedral	Catholic	1248–1880	Cologne	Germany	
134.7	?	?	?	Salisbury Cathedral	Anglican	1258	Salisbury	United Kingdom	
134	?	48	67	Tournai Cathedral	Catholic	1140–1255	Tournai	Belgium	
134	?	?	43	Speyer Cathedral	Catholic	1030–1858	Speyer	Germany	
132.54	?	?	66	San Petronio	Catholic	1390–1658	Bologna	Italy	
132	?	60	100	Seville Cathedral	Catholic	1196	Seville	Spain	
130	?	?	46	Chartres Cathedral	Catholic	1260	Chartres	France	
130	?	?	69	Notre Dame Cathedral	Catholic	1345	Paris	France	
130	?	?	?	Gloucester Cathedral	Anglican	1089–1499	Gloucester	United Kingdom	
127	?	?	67	Basilica-Cathedral of Our Lady of the Pillar	Catholic	1681–1872	Zaragoza	Spain	
126.1			67.7	People's Salvation Cathedral	Eastern Orthodox	2010–present	Bucharest	Romania	
124	?	?	60	St. Vitus Cathedral	Catholic	1344–1929	Prague	Czech Republic	
123	?	?	49	Sint Janskerk	Protestant (Reformed)	c. 1300	Gouda	Netherlands	
122	?	?	59	Toledo Cathedral	Catholic	c. 1500	Toledo	Spain	
121.66	?	?	140	Archbasilica of Saint John Lateran	Catholic	324–1735	Rome	Italy	
120.62	?	?	?	Cathedral of Our Lady of the Angels	Catholic	2002	Los Angeles	United States	
120	?	?	?	Cathedral of La Plata	Catholic	1999	La Plata	Argentina	
119.55	110	?	54.5	Mexico City Metropolitan Cathedral	Catholic	1813	Mexico City	Mexico	
118.70	?	?	?	Uppsala Cathedral	Protestant (Lutheran)	1431	Uppsala	Sweden	
118.60	101	?	75	Cathedral of Our Lady	Protestant (Lutheran)	1521	Antwerp	Belgium	
118.50	?	?	?	Abbey of Santa Giustina	Catholic	?	Padua	Italy	
118	?	?	41	Sint Bavokerk	Protestant (Reformed)	1520	Haarlem	Netherlands	Largest choir in Europe
118	?	?	49	Esztergom Basilica	Catholic	1869	Esztergom	Hungary	
118	?	?	?	Ferrara Cathedral	Catholic	1493	Ferrara	Italy	
116.7	?	?	?	Wells Cathedral	Anglican	1176–1490	Wells	United Kingdom	
115	?	?	62	St. John's Cathedral, 's-Hertogenbosch	Catholic	1380–1550	's-Hertogenbosch	Netherlands	
114.76	?	?	65	Basilica of Santa Maria degli Angeli	Catholic	1679	Assisi	Italy	
114.61	107	?	33	St Mary's Cathedral	Catholic	2000	Sydney	Australia	
114	?	?	73	Berlin Cathedral	Protestant (United)	1905	Berlin	Germany	
114	?	?	50	Troyes Cathedral	Catholic	1905	Troyes	France	
113	?	?	40	Cathedral of Mary Our Queen	Catholic	1959	Baltimore	United States	
111.45	?	?	46	São Paulo Cathedral	Catholic	1967	São Paulo	Brazil	
111.2	?	?	97.6	Saint Isaac's Cathedral	Eastern Orthodox	1818–1858	Saint Petersburg	Russia	
111.2	?	?	62	Cathedral Basilica of Saint Louis	Catholic	1907–1914	St. Louis	United States	
110.5	?	85	40	Santa Chiara (Naples)	Catholic	1310–1340	Naples	Italy	
110	?	?	52	Westminster Cathedral	Catholic	1903	London	United Kingdom	
109.57	?	?	?	Hagia Sophia	N/A (formerly Eastern Orthodox)	537	Istanbul	Turkey	
108	?	?	?	Grote Kerk	Protestant (Reformed)	1470	Dordrecht	Netherlands	Length including the west tower
107	97.6	?	19	Oliwa Cathedral	Catholic	c. 1350	Gdańsk	Poland	Longest Cistercian church in the world
103.6	?	?	56.4	St Patrick's Cathedral	Catholic	1858	Melbourne	Australia	
103.5	?	?	27	Cathedral of the Holy Cross	Catholic	1875	Boston	United States	
103.5	?	?	66	Basilica of St Mary	Catholic	1496	Gdańsk	Poland	
102	99.10	?	38.65	Lebuïnuskerk	Protestant (Reformed)	1525	Deventer	Netherlands	
102	?	?	?	Nidarosdomen	Protestant (Lutheran)	c. 1300	Trondheim	Norway	
101.19	?	?	53	St. Patrick's Cathedral	Catholic	1878	New York City	United States	
93	?	67	51.8	Aarhus Cathedral	Protestant (Lutheran)	1300	Aarhus	Denmark	
86.86	?	?	65.53	Our Lady Queen of the Most Holy Rosary Cathedral	Catholic	1940	Toledo	United States	Steel post and beam frame covered with seam faced granite and limestone accents.
77.72	65	41	26	All Saint's Cathedral	Anglican	1910	Halifax	Canada	
72			55	Alexander Nevsky Cathedral	Eastern Orthodox	1912	Sofia	Bulgaria	One of the largest Eastern Orthodox Cathedrals

Note: this list is incomplete e.g. St. Mary's Cathedral, Sydney is 107 metres long (ref. St. Mary's Cathedral website). Portugal's Alcobaça Monastery is 106 metres long.

== See also ==
- List of largest church buildings
- List of tallest churches
- List of highest church naves
- List of largest buildings
- List of the largest Protestant churches
