= J. P. D. Lloyd =

Episcopal cleric

The Reverend John Plummer Derwent Lloyd
- John Plummer Derwent Llwyd
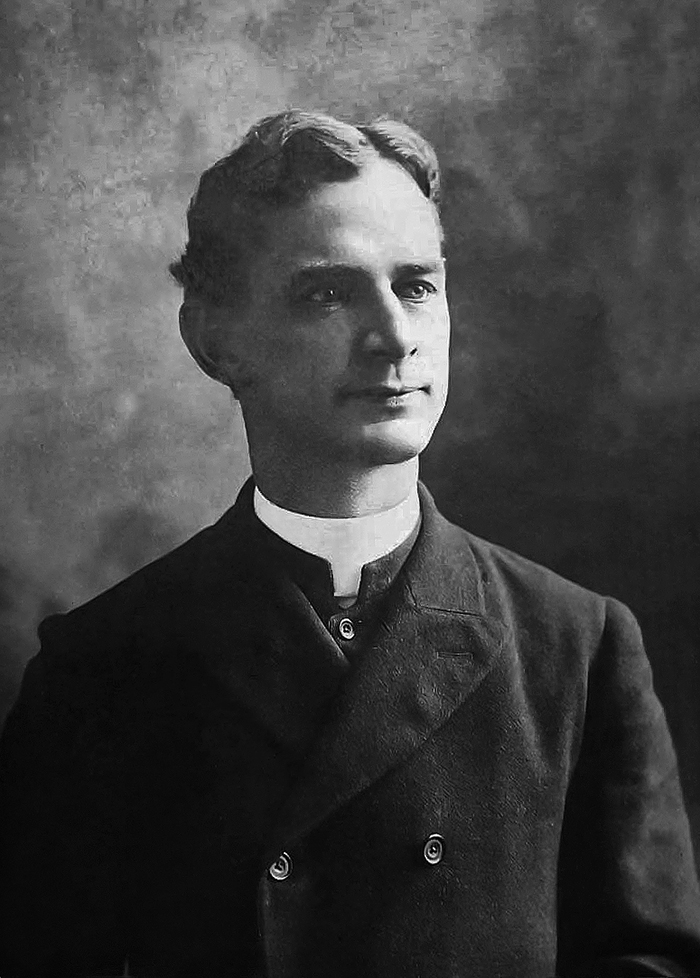
- 1880 portrait
- Born: June 7, 1861; Manchester, England
- Died: February 22, 1933 (aged 71); Halifax, Nova Scotia, Canada
- Burial place: Camp Hill Cemetery
- Education: Episcopal Theological college, McGill University, Montreal, Canada
- Occupations: Rector of St. Mark's Episcopal Cathedral, Seattle; rector of All Saints Cathedral, Halifax
- Years active: 1884 – 1933
- Organizations: Knights of Pythias; Ancient Order of United Workmen; Benevolent and Protective Order of Elks; Odd Fellows; Charity Organization Society; Masons
- Known for: An English clergyman, who served in different churches across the U.S. and Canada. His notable positions are the Dean of Nova Scotia, Rector of St. Mark's Church in Seattle, and Rector of All Saints Cathedral in Halifax. He had an active social position and took part in relief missions during Halifax Explosion in 1917.
- Notable work: The Song of the Breakers; The Message of an Indian Relic; The Vestal Virgin; Sonnet Sequence on the Spring; Poems of Nature, Childhood, and Religion; Son of Thunder: A Study of the Life and Work of John of Bethsaida
- Title: Dean of Nova Scotia
- Term: 1913 – 1933
- Successor: Rev. Dr. Cecil A. F. Whalley
- Spouse: Mary Emilie Thomas (married in 1886)
- Children: 5

John Plummer Derwent Lloyd (also commonly referred as J. P. D. Lloyd and Rev. Derwent Llwyd; June 7, 1861 – February 22, 1933) was an Episcopal cleric bearing the title of the Reverend who served in a number of churches across the United States and Canada. Of English descent, Lloyd worked at or rectored churches in Indiana, Wisconsin, Illinois, Nebraska, and Washington, and was the Episcopal Dean of Nova Scotia. Lloyd was an active resident of Seattle, Washington, inspiring public movements and taking part in the city's intellectual development through the presidency of the Public Library board of trustees. Under his supervision, the Seattle St. Mark's church and its premises were renewed and improved, and the number of people in the congregation considerably increased. In Halifax, Nova Scotia, Lloyd was a rector of the All Saints Church. He was a Halifax Explosion survivor, and during the tragedy actively participated in search and rescue missions, closely worked with the city's authorities and consoled the victims.

== Early life and family ==
John Plummer Derwent Lloyd was born on June 7, 1861, in Manchester, England. He was the eldest child of the Reverend Thomas Lloyd, a Welsh descendant and a clergyman in the Church of England, and Emma Lloyd (Plummer). Both of them were also born in Manchester.

Lloyd spent part of his childhood with his grandparents in Derwent, Derbyshire. In 1874, his parents decided to move to Canada. There, John's father worked as rector of St. James' church in Gravenhurst, Ontario. Later, the elder Lloyd was an incumbent of the parish of Huntsville, Ontario, and an archdeacon of the Diocese of Algoma.

== Education and first jobs ==
At the age of ten, Lloyd went to the Royal Lancasterian Grammar School in Manchester, one of the famous English preparatory schools, and spent three years there. After the family moved to Canada, he was tutored by the Reverend Joseph S. Cole for four years.

Lloyd studied at Trinity College in Toronto, the University of Toronto, and the Oxford and Berlin Universities. Lloyd's first job was a teacher in the schools of Ontario, Canada, where he worked for three years. Later, he moved to Toronto and worked in merchandising for another three years.

In 1883, Lloyd decided to start his career in the ministry. He entered the Episcopal Theological college at McGill University in Montreal, Canada, where he studied for one year. His second year Lloyd spent studying and working in St. George's Parish, New York, being tutored by the Reverend W. S. Rainsford.

== Career ==
=== Beginning of his career ===
In 1884, Lloyd was ordained to the deaconate, and the following year to the priesthood, by Indiana bishop David Buel Knickerbacker. Later, he spent two years in missionary work in Indiana and Wisconsin, including being a curate at All Saints Church in Milwaukee. In 1887–1889, he was invited to be the rector of St. Paul's Church in Riverside, a suburb of Chicago.

In 1889, after leaving St. Paul's, Lloyd became a rector in the Church of the Good Shepherd in Omaha, Nebraska, and stayed there for eight years.

=== Life and career in Seattle, Washington ===
In September 1897, Lloyd came to Seattle as a rector at St. Mark's Church, succeeding David Claiborne Garrett.

Under Lloyd's management, the church was extended and renewed, new lands were acquired, a new organ was purchased, and a rectory, appraised at $6,200 ($163,000 in 2020 dollars (Note: The approximate value converted to 2020 dollars, based on a standard adjustment of the 1913 dollar value using the Consumer Price Index as calculated by United States Department of Labor.)) was built. During the six years of changes and development, the value of the church's property increased from $15,000 to, conservatively estimated, $60,000 (from $395,000 to $1,580,000).

Besides all of the improvements, Lloyd's other aim was to popularize the church and spirituality. During the six years of his rectorship, the congregation increased from 500 to more than 1,000, making St. Mark's the leading Episcopal church on the Pacific coast.

In 1908, Lloyd became a part of the Emmanuel Movement, a new system of healing adopted by Seattle Episcopal clergy. Lloyd was elected a chairman in the related organization, aimed at the discussion, study, and launch of the new system.

Lloyd succeeded as a lecturer and speaker on various subjects and occasions, and was an inspiration for many public movements. Aside from his ministerial position, he was president of the board of trustees for the Seattle Public Library. After the library was destroyed by fire in 1901, Lloyd became chairman of the building committee for the new construction. The new library couldn't be finished due to various obstacles and the lack of funds, and Lloyd played a key role in soliciting an additional $20,000 ($529,000) from Andrew Carnegie, a Scottish-American industrialist and philanthropist.

During his time in Seattle, Lloyd was a member of the Episcopal Diocese of Olympia. As its clerical delegate, he attended the convention of the Protestant Episcopal church in Richmond, Virginia.

Lloyd resigned from St. Mark's Church in 1909. The congregation remained without a leader for four months, until on January 2, 1910, Ernest Vincent Shayler took Lloyd's place.

=== Later career ===
From 1909 to 1912, Lloyd served as the vice-provost of Trinity University, Toronto. In 1913, he came to Halifax, Nova Scotia, where he worked as rector and dean of All Saints Cathedral. He remained the Episcopal Dean of Nova Scotia until his death.

Lloyd's other later positions included: deputy to the General Convention of the Episcopal Church in the United States of America (which he occupied twice), and clerical deputy from the Nova Scotia diocese to the General Synod of the Church of England in Canada.

== Memberships in clubs and organizations ==
In the course of his life, Lloyd was a member of a number of fraternity organizations, including the Masons, the Knights of Pythias, the Ancient Order of United Workmen, the Elks, and the Odd Fellows. He was decorated a knight by the King of Italy.

He was one of the founders of the University Club of Seattle, a social organization for the graduates of recognized Seattle colleges and universities established in 1900, and the president of the Monday Club. He worked as a director and twice as president of the Seattle Charity Organization Society (also called Associated Charities) from 1897 to 1899, and was a member of the American Archaeological Society.

== Halifax Explosion of 1917 ==
The Halifax Explosion took place on December 6, 1917, in Halifax, Nova Scotia, and was called the most ruinous explosion caused by humans prior to Hiroshima. The death toll exceeded 2,000, and over 9,000 were injured, including hundreds permanently blinded. Over 20,000 people lost their homes, savings, and possessions.

At the time of the explosion, Lloyd was reading the Morning Prayer in the chapel of All Saint's Cathedral, accompanied by his wife and two other women of his congregation. They felt trembling and, seconds later, the explosion. Lloyd described his feelings at that moment in a letter, saying he thought it was "a German shell" and he felt "a sensation of utter powerlessness." The wave shattered glass windows and ripped the solid oak doors from the hinges. After the service, Lloyd decided to head downtown in case someone needed his assistance. After hearing witness accounts of the scale of the tragedy, Lloyd rode to the heart of the devastated area.

Lloyd assisted the wounded and advised officers regarding the disposal of the deceased. He worked on search and rescue for four hours straight, and then met with the city authorities to discuss options on where to place the temporary mortuary. After a brief stop at home to change, he headed to Camp Hill Hospital to provide comfort to victims there and listen to what they had witnessed. In his letter, published the following year in Seattle Daily Times, Lloyd expressed admiration for Halifax authorities, citizens, and American people in general for their quick efficient reactions to the catastrophe.

== Incidents and controversies ==
In Seattle, Lloyd's family lived in a rectory built during his management in St. Mark's church. In 1902, it was almost robbed during Lloyd and his wife's absence. When the parents returned home, a thief was discovered and cornered by Lloyd and his son in one of the rooms. However, the thief managed to escape through the window without taking anything.

In 1907, Lloyd refused to preside over the marriage of a 26-year-old woman and her Chinese groom, who had travelled from California to Washington to get married. In 1908, Lloyd initiated another dispute, when he pointed out the poor church attendance by the men of his congregation.

== Personal life and death ==
During his lifetime, Lloyd's surname was typically spelled as "Llwyd," alluding to his Welsh origin (Llwyd in Welsh: grey, a common Welsh first and last name).

Lloyd married Mary Emilie Thomas on December 28, 1886. She was born in Bradford, Ontario, and as a daughter of William H. Thomas and Adeline Thomas (Kissam), a descendant of aristocratic Knickerbocker families. The Lloyds had five children: Gwendolyn, Thomas, Adeline, Charlewood, and Margaret.

In 1933, Lloyd was hit by a car crossing the road and taken to Victoria General Hospital in Halifax. He suffered a broken leg and shock, but the doctors announced his condition was "comparatively good." He returned home after several weeks in the hospital, but suffered a heart attack shortly thereafter and died on February 22, 1933. The memorial service was held in St. Mark's Church in Seattle.

== Publications ==
During his life, Lloyd published a number of magazine articles, a small volume of poems named The Song of the Breaker, a monograph of indigenous life called The Message of an Indian Relic, a dramatic poem titled The Vestal Virgin (1920), and severale books: Sonnet Sequence on the Spring (1925), Poems of Nature, Childhood, and Religion (1928); and a work named Son of Thunder: A Study of the Life and Work of John of Bethsaida (1932).

== See also ==
- St. Mark's Episcopal Cathedral, Seattle
- Halifax Explosion
- Dean of Nova Scotia
- All Saints Cathedral (Halifax, Nova Scotia)
- Emmanuel Movement
- Andrew Carnegie

== Literature cited ==
- "A Brief History of Saint Mark's", saintmarks.org, Seattle: St. Mark's Episcopal Cathedral
- "CPI Inflation Calculator", Bureau of Labor Statistics, Washington: United States Department of Labor
- "Bold, bad burglar", Seattle Star, vol. 4, no. 236, Seattle: E. W. Scripps, p. 1, November 14, 1902, ISSN 2159-5577, LCCN sn87093407, OCLC 17285351
- "Rejects chinese groom", The Spokane Press, Spokane: Press Pub. Co., p. 3, August 9, 1907, ISSN 2328-5710, LCCN sn88085947, OCLC 18446894
- "Northwest personals", The Spokesman-Review, Spokane: Cowles Company, p. 7, September 10, 1907, ISSN 1064-7317, LCCN sn84024754, OCLC 11102610
- Bridges, John, ed. (September 16, 1908), "Merry Widows make no hit", Evening Statesman, Walla Walla: Statesman Pub. Co., p. 1, ISSN 2331-9771, LCCN sn88085421, OCLC 17397533
- Woods, Rufus, ed. (November 12, 1908), "New system of healing adopted", Wenatchee Daily World, Cleveland: World Publishing Company, p. 1, ISSN 2328-3882, LCCN sn86072041, OCLC 14402228
- Blethen, Alden J., ed. (January 3, 1910), "Bishop institutes Rev. E. V. Shayler", Seattle Daily Times, Seattle: The Seattle Times Company, p. 8, ISSN 2639-4898, LCCN sn86072007, OCLC 1765328
- One Thousand American Men of Mark Today (PDF), Chicago: American Men of Mark, 1916, OCLC 5424685
- "Rev. J. P. D. Llwyd tells of Terrors of Explosion at Halifax", Seattle Daily Times, Seattle: The Seattle Times Company, p. 9, February 17, 1918, ISSN 2639-4898, LCCN sn86072007, OCLC 1765328
- Smith, E. Norman; O'Leary, Grattan, eds. (January 3, 1933), "Anglican dean is hurt when hit by automobile", The Ottawa Journal, Ottawa: Philip Ross, p. 3, ISSN 0841-453X, OCLC 1019228964
- "Dr. J. P. D. Llwyd dies of injuries in motor crash", Seattle Daily Times, Seattle: The Seattle Times Company, p. 10, February 23, 1933, ISSN 2639-4898, LCCN sn86072007, OCLC 1765328
- "World briefs", Edmonton Journal, Edmonton: Southam Publishing, p. 2, February 23, 1933, LCCN 2009218098, OCLC 440706584
- "Dean John P. D. Llwyd dies in Halifax, N S", Boston Globe, Boston: Boston Globe Media Partners, p. 14, February 23, 1933, ISSN 2572-1828, LCCN sn83045484, OCLC 9497068
- "Nova Scotia dean succumbs to heart attack after crash", The Province, Toronto: Southam Publishing, p. 12, February 23, 1933, ISSN 0839-3311, OCLC 885825442
- "Nova Scotia dean passes", The Windsor Star, Windsor: W. F. Herman, p. 25, February 23, 1933, ISSN 0839-2277, LCCN cn88031396, OCLC 18410555
- "Succeeds Dean Llwyd", The Gazette, Toronto: Postmedia Network, p. 7, July 5, 1933, ISSN 0384-1294, OCLC 456824368
- Beatty, John David, ed. (August 12, 2020), "Rev. John Plummer Derwent Llwyd", scalar.usc.edu, Episcopal Diocese of Northern Indiana Archives
- Bagley, Clarence B. (1916), History of Seattle: From the Earliest Settlement to the Present Time, Chicago: S. J. Clarke Publishing Company, LCCN 16011408, OCLC 7372062
- Denny, A. A. (1903), A volume of memoirs and genealogy of representative citizens of the city of Seattle and county of King, Washington, including biographies of many of those who have passed away (PDF), New York: Lewis Publishing Company, LCCN 05017216, OCLC 8587001
- Glasner, Joyce (2003), Nault, Jennifer (ed.), The Halifax explosion: surviving the blast that shook a nation, Canmore: Altitude Publishing Canada Ltd., ISBN 155153942X, LCCN 2003495366
- Llwyd, John Derwent (1909), The Message of an Indian Relic (PDF), Seattle: Lowman & Hanford Co., ISBN 0665797168, OCLC 1111878276
- Morgan, Prys; Morgan, T. J. (1985), Welsh surnames, Cardiff: University of Wales Press, ISBN 0-7083-0880-5, OCLC 13328841
- Prosch, Charles (1904), Reminiscences of Washington Territory (PDF), Seattle, LCCN a25000214
- Prosser, William Farrand (1903), Lewis, Edward Gardner (ed.), A history of the Puget Sound country, its resources, its commerce and its people, New York City: Edward Gardner Lewis, LCCN 05013767
- Rhodenizer, Vernon Blair (1948), At the sign of the hand and pen, Toronto: Canadian Authors Association, LCCN 73340369, OCLC 1036016940
- Warren, Jim (June 21, 1959), "New building, same site for Seattle's library", Seattle Daily Times, Seattle: The Seattle Times Company, p. 114, ISSN 2639-4898, LCCN sn86072007, OCLC 1765328
