= Capella Regalis Choirs =

Canadian choir

- Choir
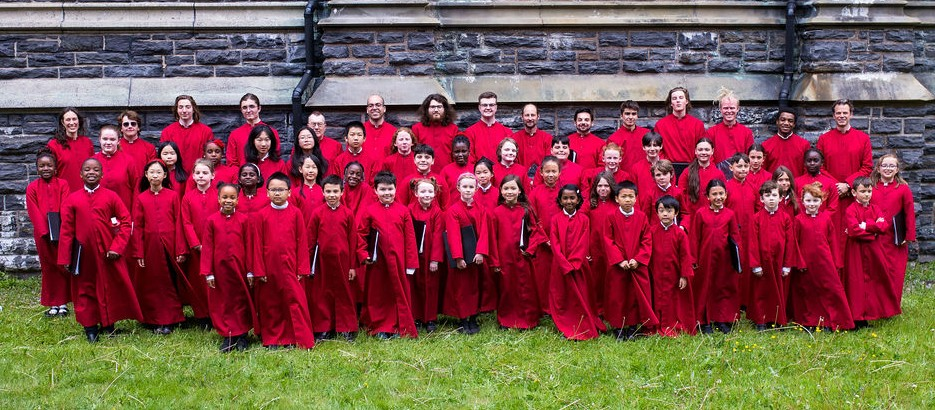
- Founder: Nick Halley
- Director: Nick Halley, Vanessa Halley
- Website: https://capellaregalis.com/

Capella Regalis Choirs is a Canadian charitable organization based in Halifax, Nova Scotia. Founded in 2010 by director Nick Halley, the organization follows the tradition of historic European church choirs, offering free music education to children and performing a broad repertoire of sacred and secular works.

The organization comprises a Boys Choir, a Girls Choir, and a professional Men's Choir, and performs regularly throughout Nova Scotia and beyond. As a registered charity, Capella Regalis supports its programs through donations, grants, and performance revenue. Its mission is to make choral training and performance opportunities accessible to all children, regardless of financial means.

== History ==
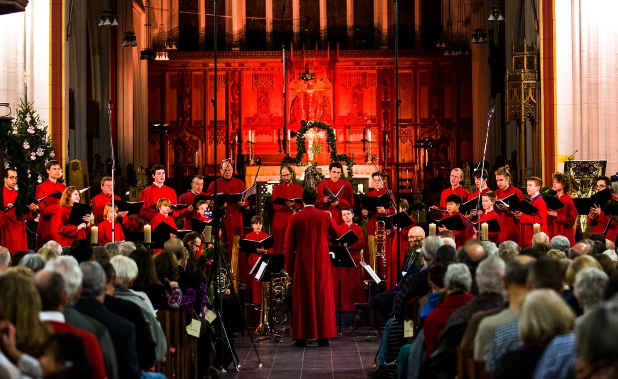
Capella Regalis Choirs performing at the Cathedral Church of All Saints, Halifax

Capella Regalis Choirs was founded in 2010 in Halifax, Nova Scotia, by director Nick Halley. The group originally sang at the University of King's College Chapel, and is now based at St. Andrew's United Church, and the Cathedral Church of All Saints.

In its early years, the choir collaborated on works such as Missa Gaia by Paul Winter and J.S. Bach’s St. Matthew Passion. It also began regional tours in partnership with the Musique Royale concert series and introduced educational initiatives such as the Probationers Program for new choristers and the Young Men’s Program for adolescent boys with changing voices.

In 2022, the organization expanded to include a Girls Choir, following the same educational framework. The organization further broadened its reach in 2024 with the launch of the South Shore Programme, offering weekly rehearsals in Lunenburg for children in rural communities along Nova Scotia’s South Shore.

== Performances and collaborations ==
Capella Regalis presents a regular concert season from September through June, including liturgical services, public concerts, and school outreach performances. The choir’s annual programming includes A Chorister’s Christmas, a concert series performed in various venues across Nova Scotia.

Capella Regalis has toured throughout the Maritime provinces and appeared at events such as the Scotia Festival of Music.
