= Nicholas Halley =

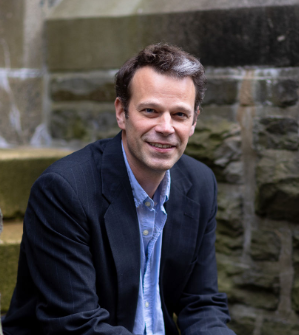

Background information
- Occupations: Conductor; keyboardist; composer
- Website: nickhalley.com

Nicholas Halley is a Canadian conductor, keyboardist, and composer based in Nova Scotia. Halley is the founder and Artistic Director of Capella Regalis Choirs, and the Assistant Director of Music at the All Saints Cathedral in Halifax.

== Career ==
From 2005 to 2008 Halley worked as the assistant director of Chorus Angelicus, a children's choir, and Gaudeamus, a professional adult chamber choir, both founded by his father, Paul Halley. During this time, he performed as a conductor at Tanglewood' Ozawa Hall, Boston Symphony Hall, the Cathedral of St. John the Divine in New York, as well as on national and international tours.

In 2008, Halley moved to Halifax, Nova Scotia, to continue studying under his father, who moved to Nova Scotia to become Director of Music at the University of King's College, St. George's Round Church, and the Atlantic School of Theology. As an apprentice to his father, Halley continued to develop his musical life, focusing on developing skills in liturgical music, pipe organ and choral direction.

From 2008 to 2021, Halley was the assistant director of Music at the University of King's College in Halifax. Working together with his father who was Director of Music at the college, they expanded the chapel music programme, initiated choral scholarships for students, and directed the King's College Chapel Choir.

In 2010, Halley founded The King's Chorus, a choral ensemble of 60-80 singers for students at King's College, Dalhousie University and community members. Under his direction, the King's Chorus performed two concerts a year. He directed The King's Chorus from 2010 to 2021.

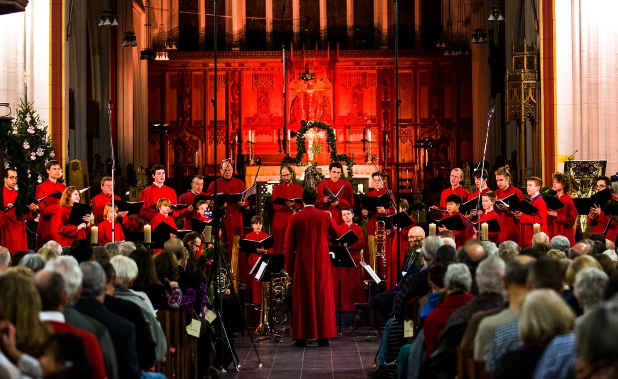
Nick Halley directing Capella Regalis Choirs.

Halley is the founder and artistic director of Capella Regalis Choirs, a Canadian charity and performing arts organization based in Halifax, Nova Scotia. Founded as the Capella Regalis Men & Boys Choir in 2010, Capella Regalis now comprises a boys choir, girls choir, and professional men's choir.

For the 2013–14 season, Halley was the host of the CBC national radio program Choral Concert.

In 2015, Halley became the assistant director of Music at the All Saints Cathedral in Halifax.

== Awards ==
In 2012, Halley was awarded the Queen Elizabeth II Diamond Jubilee Medal.

== Discography ==
- 1991: Paul Halley "Angel on a Stone Wall" – percussionist
- 1994: Chorus Angelicus "Voices of Light" – singer
- 1995: Chorus Angelicus/Gaudeamus "Christmas Angelicus" – singer
- 1996: Gaudeamus "Sacred Feast" – singer
- 1998: Theresa Thomason "Sound Over All Waters" – singer, percussionist
- 2004: Chris Norman "In the Fields in Frost and Snow" – drummer, keyboardist, arranger
- 2006: Chorus Angelicus & Gaudeamus "What Child is This?" – singer
- 2008: Nick Halley "Barnum Hill" – composer, arranger, drummer, percussionist, keyboardist
- 2011: Concerto Caledonia "Revenge of the Folksingers" – percussionist, singer
- 2013: University of King's College Chapel Choir "Let Us Keep the Feast" – conductor, singer
- 2013: Papilio "First Flight" – percussionist
- 2014: Suzie LeBlanc "La Veillée de Noël" – percussionist
- 2014: Capella Regalis "My Eyes for Beauty Pine" – conductor, singer
- 2015: Old Man Luedecke "Domestic Eccentric" (ECMA winner) – drummer, singer
- 2017: Paul Halley & Keramion Singers "In the Wide Awe and Wisdom" – conductor, singer
- 2017: Capella Regalis "Greater Love" – conductor, singer
- 2019: Capella Regalis "Love Came Down: Carols for Christmas" – conductor, singer
