= Dean of Nova Scotia =

The Dean of Nova Scotia is an Anglican dean in the Anglican Diocese of Nova Scotia and Prince Edward Island of the Ecclesiastical Province of Canada, based at All Saints Cathedral in Halifax, Nova Scotia. The incumbent is also Rector of All Saints.

The incumbents have been:

Tenure	Incumbent	Notes
1864–1874	William Bullock	(1797–1874) 1st Dean of Nova Scotia
1875–1887	No Deans appointed
1889–1906	Edwin Gilpin	(1821–1906)
1907–1912	Edward Patrick Crawford	(?-1912)
1913–1933	John Plummer Derwent Llwyd	(1861–1933)
1933–1942	Arthur Francis Cecil Whalley	(?–1942)
1942–1958	No Deans appointed
1958–1979	Edward Brenton Nicol Cochran	(1915–1993)
1979–1996	John Austin Munroe	(1931–2005)
1997–2006	Glen R. Burgomaster
2008–present	Paul Smith
