= St. Peter's Cathedral (Charlottetown) =

Coordinates: 46.234428°N 63.132904°W

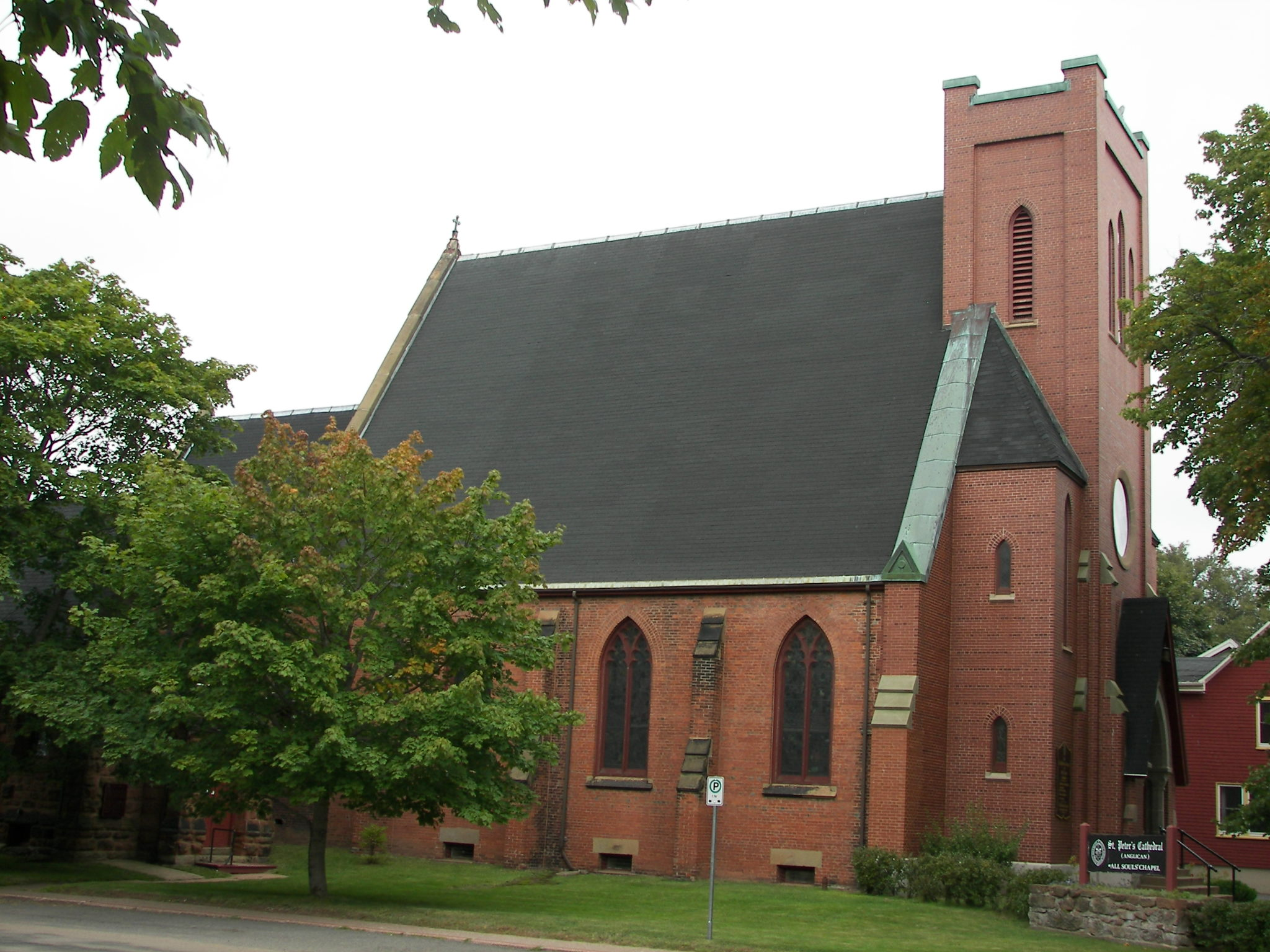
- Exterior of St. Peter's Cathedral
- St. Peter's Cathedral
- Location: Charlottetown, Prince Edward Island
- Address: 11 All Souls' Lane
- Country: Canada
- Denomination: Anglican Church of Canada
- Tradition: High Church
- Churchmanship: Anglo-Catholic
- Website: https://www.stpeter.org/StPetersCathedral/

History
- Status: Cathedral
- Founded: 1869
- Dedication: St. Peter
- Consecrated: June 29, 1879

Administration
- Province: Ecclesiastical Province of Canada
- Diocese: Diocese of Nova Scotia and Prince Edward Island

St. Peter's Cathedral, Charlottetown, Prince Edward Island, Canada, was founded in 1869 as a result of the influence of the Oxford Movement. Since that time, the parish has remained Anglo-Catholic in ethos and practice.

== General Information ==
St. Peter's was designated a cathedral in 1879 by Bishop Hibbert Binney, the Bishop of Nova Scotia. Over the years, it has served as a second cathedral of the Anglican Diocese of Nova Scotia (now called Nova Scotia and Prince Edward Island). The principal cathedral of the diocese is All Saints' Cathedral in Halifax. The diocese contains two civil provinces of Canada. St. Peter's Cathedral is located on Rochford Square, corner of All Souls' Lane and Rochford Street, Charlottetown.

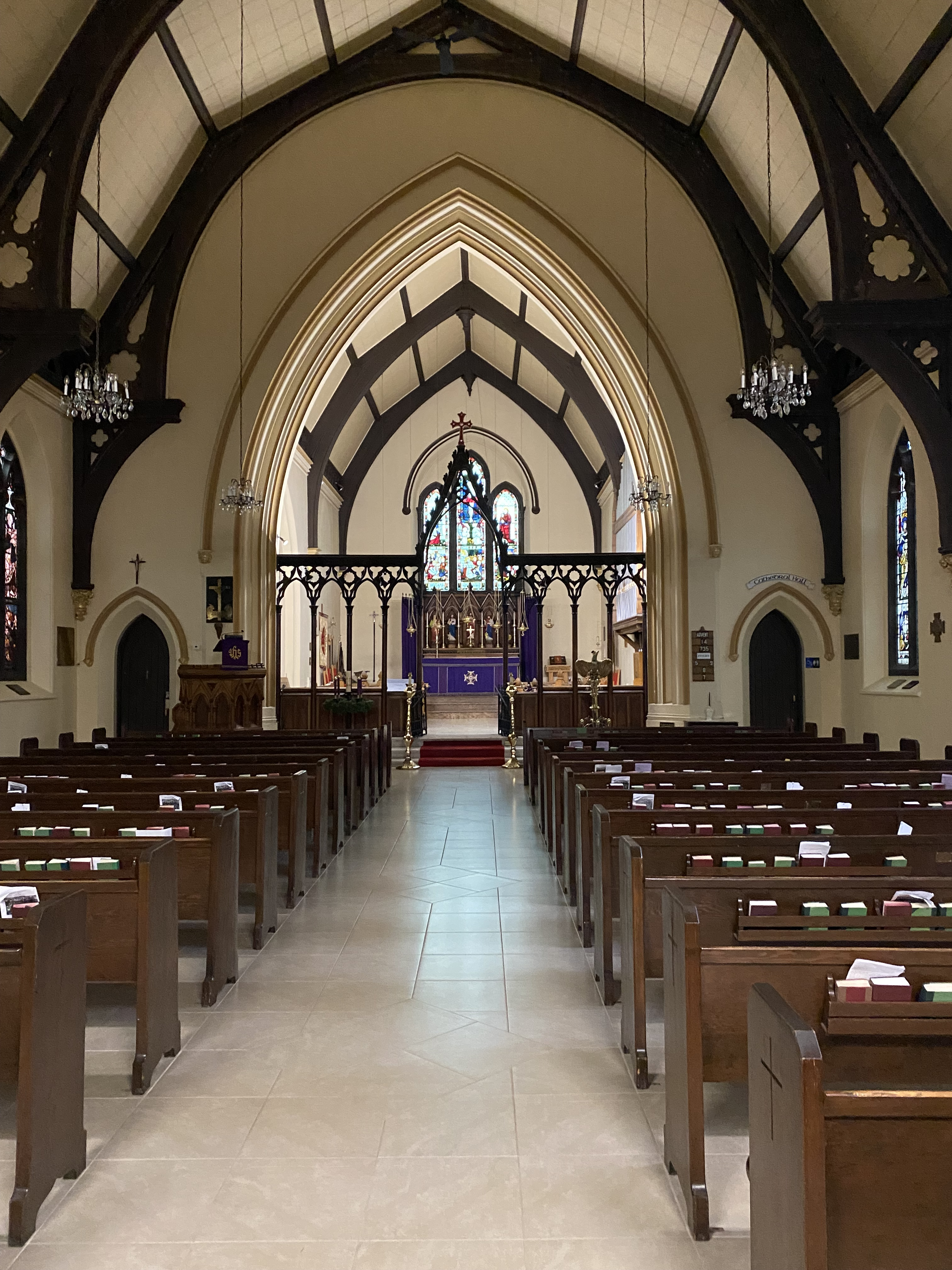
The interior of St. Peter's Cathedral, Charlottetown PEI in December(during advent) 2025.

Attached to the west side of the cathedral is All Souls' Chapel—designated as a National Historic Site in 1990. See All Souls' Chapel (Prince Edward Island).

== History ==
St. Peter's Cathedral parish was established in 1869. Work on the construction of the building began in 1867 and the first services were held on June 13, 1869. In December 1869, local artist Robert Harris (1849–1919) was commissioned to create scenes for the cathedral's first Christmas celebration.

As mentioned above, the founding of St. Peter's was directly linked to the Oxford Movement — a theological and liturgical revival of the Catholic tradition within Anglicanism, which was underway in parts of the Church of England at that time. The Oxford Movement had begun in England in the 1830s. In the 1850s, when some Charlottetown Anglicans from the Parish of Charlotte (St. Paul's) travelled abroad on business, they were inspired by the effects of this movement on the worship of England's churches. They returned to Prince Edward Island determined that these teachings and observances be practised in Charlottetown.

Anglican parishes on Prince Edward Island were under the jurisdiction of the Bishop of the Diocese of Nova Scotia. In the Rt. Revd Hibbert Binney, the travellers found a pastoral leader sympathetic to the Oxford Movement. Before long, he decided that a building then being planned as a "chapel-of-ease" of St. Paul's Church would become instead a cathedral under his own control.

The first services were held in June, 1869. Ten years later, on the Festival of St. Peter and St. Paul (June 29), the cathedral was consecrated. The cathedral building occupies the corner of All Souls' Lane and Rochford Street. It faces a park known as Rochford Square and is across the street from the Prince Edward Island Government offices.

Throughout its history, St. Peter's Cathedral has continued in the principles on which it was founded, as reflected in preaching, teaching, and worship.

Most of the cathedral incumbents or rectors have served for a significant period of time. The present rector is only the tenth since the parish was founded. The first priest-incumbent, the Revd George Hodgson (1869–1885), was succeeded by the Revd Canon James Simpson (1886–1920). He was followed by Canon Elwin Malone (1921–1952). Following Canon Malone, the Revd Canon Gerald Moffatt served as rector from 1952 to 1958. He was followed by Archdeacon J. R. Davies (1958–1967), Archdeacon G. S. Tanton (1967–1973), and the Revd Canon H. M. D. Westin (1974–1990). The Revd Canon Peter Harris, came to the parish as curate in 1989 and was appointed rector in late Fall of 1990. Upon the retirement of Canon Harris on November 30, 2014, the Revd David Garrett was appointed rector. Father Garrett retired in January 2026, and was succeeded by Father Colin Nicolle, who became the Rector on the 16th of November, 2026.

St. Peter's Cathedral is well known to tourists and visitors because of the noted All Souls' Chapel, which is attached to the cathedral on the Rochford Street side. It was originally conceived as a memorial to the first priest-incumbent, Father Hodgson. The second incumbent, Canon James Simpson, along with two gifted parishioners, brothers William Critchlow Harris, an architect, and Robert Harris, an artist, envisaged what the future chapel would look like. William chose Island sandstone for the exterior and Robert adorned the interior with eighteen paintings depicting the Church Fathers, scenes from the New Testament and, over the altar, the majestic circular painting of the Ascending Christ. Skilled Island craftsmen succeeded in bringing to life the detail they envisaged. Work on the construction of the chapel began in 1888, and it was first opened for worship in November, 1889. In 1990, All Souls' Chapel was designated as a "National Historic Site". An exterior plaque in recognition of this designation was dedicated at a special ceremony in July 1994.

A new parish hall attached to the cathedral was erected in 2004, replacing an older hall that had stood on that site for over 100 years.

A full schedule of Sunday and weekday worship is maintained (Matins, Evensong, and the Holy Eucharist), and there are numerous parish organizations and activities.

== All Souls' Chapel ==
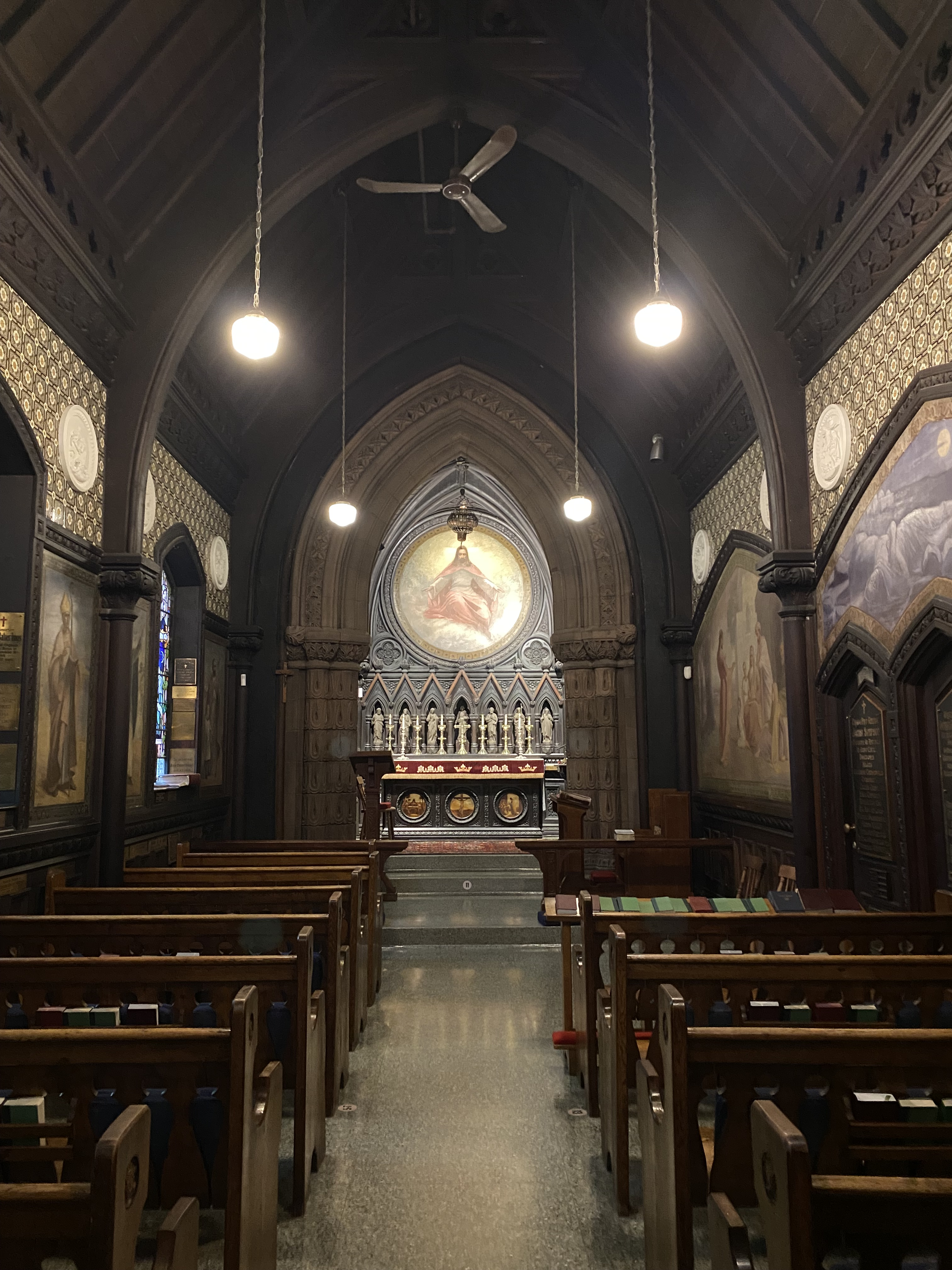
The interior of All Souls' Chapel, Charlottetown PEI.

All Souls' Chapel was originally conceived as a memorial to Father George Hodgson, the first "priest-incumbent" of St. Peter's Cathedral, and was built in 1888 to plans prepared by William Critchlow Harris, ARCA (1854-1913), a member of the first class confirmed in St Peter's Church in 1869. The arched reredos, with statues of apostles and evangelists occupying the niches, is typical of Harris's altar screens. The Chapel walls are occupied by 16 paintings by William's brother, Robert Harris, CMG, PRCA (1849 - 1919). The round painting above the reredos is of Christ ascending to Heaven, and has been a treasured icon to generations of Cathedral parishioners. The Chapel was built by Lowe Brothers of Charlottetown, and the woodwork was carved by Messrs Whitlock and Doull.

The Sanctuary is that part of the Chapel inside the great arch, and contains the Altar, at which the Holy Mysteries of Christ's Body and Blood in the Eucharist have been celebrated daily since 1890. Set into the front of the Altar are three roundels painted by Robert Harris that show (a) Christ known of his companions "in the breaking of bread" at Emmaus on the Day of His Resurrection; (b) His Crucifixion; (c) Christ administering the Chalice to communicants. In the arched niches of the Reredos are statues of Christ (centre) flanked by St. John and St. James on His right and St. Peter on His left, with additional Apostles, including St. Paul, carrying the instruments used to put them to death. To the right of the Altar is the Credence Table, on which the Bread and Wine are placed before the Offertory. Set high in the side walls of the Sanctuary are portraits (left) of St. Luke the Evangelist, by tradition an artist as well as a physician, a memorial to Robert Harris; and (right) St. James the Just, a memorial to Canon James Simpson, who played an important part in planning the Chapel before his death in 1920. Every subject inside the Sanctuary is drawn from the New Testament Church.

The Arch is made from grey Wallace freestone, from the Nova Scotia side of the Northumberland Strait, and is richly carved with foliage and teardrops to symbolise both the Life Christ gives and the sorrows He suffered. The earliest churches built in Rome in the 4th century incorporated triumphal arches honoring Christ as King of kings and Lord of lords, and celebrating His victory over sin and death. William Harris always incorporated this feature in his church designs.

The Nave: the Gospel side is lined with portraits of early Church Fathers, as follows:

St. Gregory the Great, shown with a blond Anglo-Saxon acolyte, illustrates a story told by the Venerable Bede. One day Gregory saw some fair-haired children for sale in the slave market in Rome. "What nation are they?" he asked. "They're Angles (English)," he was told. "Non Angli sed angeli (not Angles but angels)!" punned Gregory. He wished to evangelise the English; but when he was made Pope instead he sent 40 monks under St. Augustine of Canterbury to England in 597, and the Church of England was the result.

St. John Chrysostom, Patriarch of Constantinople 398 - 407, was a celebrated preacher (chrysostom means golden-tongued) and reformer who was deliberately killed by his enemies in the Byzantine court and Church by enforced travelling on foot in cold weather. Harris mistakenly shows him wearing the western-style chasuble and alb instead of an eastern phelonion

St. Augustine of Hippo (354 - 430) was one of the most influential theologians in Church history. Once, while writing his book on God titled De Trinitate (On the Trinity), he went for a stroll on the beach where he saw a small boy running back and forth with a bucket, pouring water from the shore into a hole he'd dug in the sand. "What are you doing?" asked Augustine. "I am pouring the sea into this hole," replied the boy. Augustine thought, "I'm no different - trying to get the great mystery of God inside my little head!"

St. Ambrose, Bishop of Milan 374 - 97, is shown refusing the Emperor Theodosius I entry to the basilica in Milan on Easter Day because he had massacred 7000 people in Thessalonica.

St. Jerome (342 - 420), settled in Bethlehem in 386, where he lived in a cave next to that in which Christ had been born, translating the Scriptures from Hebrew and Greek into Latin. He enjoyed controversies with heretics, kept a pet lion (to discourage interruptions?) and a skull to remind himself of his mortality.

St. Athanasius, Patriarch of Alexandria 328 - 373 became known as Athanasius Contra Mundum (Against the World) for his resolute support of orthodox Nicene Christianity in opposition to the Arian heresy which denied the divinity of Christ. For most of his life he was persecuted and often exiled; but his resolute character as well as his theology proved to be the outstanding obstacle to the triumph of Arianism, which faded away in the next century.

The Nave Windows: the first two (the Archangel St. Michael and the Blessed Virgin Mary & Child) are by Kemp and are memorials to Frank Carvell and Margaret Mathilda Jane Hodgson respectively. Notice the crownedM and the serpent (symbol of evil) being trodden underfoot in both pictures, as well as other symbols drawn from the Revelation of St. John the Divine. The third window, from the William Morris Studio, shows Christ as Christus Rex, or Christ the King, and is a memorial to a sister of Robert, William and Thomas Harris, Margaret Ellin Harris (1854 - 1944) and her husband, William Lawson Cotton, 1848 - 1928. It also has a serpent.

The Entrance Wall of All Souls' Chapel has three Robert Harris paintings which return to New Testament themes:

The Raising of Dorcas, a memorial to Dorcas Octavia Pedder Desbrisay, in illustration of the story told in Acts 9 of the raising of Dorcas by St. Peter.

Christ Calling St. Andrew to become "a fisher of men". The figure of Andrew is a portrait of Thomas Harris, Robert and William Harris's older brother, who died in 1904. The painting is in his memory.

The Crucifixion of Christ, over the door, is in memory of William C. Harris, the Chapel's architect, and was the last painting to be installed in the Chapel. Appropriately, it is placed under a window showing Christ's Resurrection. The painting and the window placed over the door suggest that it is "through the grave and gate of death" that we pass to our joyful resurrection. Inside the door, in the small porch, is a statue of St. Peter holding the keys "to the Kingdom of Heaven" (see St. Matt. 16: 18-19).

Two terra cotta medallions, of St. Peter and St. Paul, are set high in the entrance wall of the Chapel. Originally 14 such medallions were planned, but only these two were made. Eventually a set of Stations of the Cross was obtained, and 12 (of the 14) were set in the places prepared for the medallions. Fine imported encaustic tiles sheathe the upper reaches of the wall.

The Epistle Side also has three Robert Harris paintings, two showing persons only recently deceased when the paintings were made.

The Morson Boys, two brothers who died within days of each other in 1899, are shown with other children with Christ in Paradise.

The Martyrdom of St. Stephen, stoned to death in Jerusalem c.35 after preaching a sermon his hearers disliked (Acts 6), occupies the space over the doors to the sacristy. Two of the doors accommodate Latin memorials to the Reverend George Hodgson and Canon James Simpson, the Cathedral's first Incumbents (so styled rather than Dean because St. Peter's was not given a Chapter when it was made the Anglican Cathedral for Prince Edward Island in 1879). A third door panel commemorates Robert and William Harris.

The Harris Family, a group portrait, shows members of the family who died before 1914 (with the exception of Thomas, who is portrayed elsewhere) as a Holy Land family being blessed by Christ. In the centre sits mother, Sarah Stretch Harris (1818 - 1897) with Tom's son Clare Harris (1880 - 1892) standing alongside her, and his sister, Dora Harris (1892 - 1911), sitting in front. To the left of Clare is Martha (Little Patty) Harris (1856 - 1864), a sibling of Thomas, Robert, William and Margaret Ellin. Leaning over Sarah is William Critchlow Harris junior (1854 - 1913), the Chapel's architect, and sitting back in the shadows is the family patriarch, William Critchlow Harris senior (1813 - 1899), who brought his family to Charlottetown from Liverpool, England, on the barque Isabel in 1856. Each of the trees in nearby Rochford Square, planted in 1884, represents a Harris family member.

Over the years many memorials have been placed in All Souls' Chapel. The pews commemorate Mrs. George Hodgson, who died in 1934, and accommodate the living worshippers who, surrounded by the apostles and saints of old, and the faithful departed, complete the scheme of All Souls under the Lordship of Christ in the altar painting. Most of the plates commemorate deceased members of the Cathedral congregation, some of them familiar names from the civic and social life of Charlottetown in days gone by. One carries a portrait of Ruth Harris (1893 - 1984), a niece of Robert Harris, daughter of his youngest brother Ned, made from Robert's charcoal sketch of her when she was 24.

The kneelers, made by women of the Cathedral congregation, show the phoenix, a mythical bird supposed to have come back to life after perishing by fire - a symbol of the Resurrection.

On the organ a Book of Remembrance contains names of deceased members of the Cathedral congregation(as of at least August 2025, this organ and the Book of Remembrance are currently located in the cathedral).

The Sanctuary Lamp carries a white light, symbolic of Christ's Real Presence in the Blessed Sacrament, and showing that it is reserved nearby. Anglican Church teaching affirms Christ's Real Presence in the Sacrament while rejecting Transubstantiation as an explanation of the manner of it.

Morning Prayer and Evening Prayer are said daily in the Chapel, and the Holy Eucharist is celebrated Tuesdays at 7:30 a.m. and other weekdays (except Mondays) at 10 a.m. If Monday is a Holy Day, Evening Prayer is followed by a celebration of the Holy Communion. Morning Prayer is said 15 minutes before the Eucharist. This daily round of worship and prayer is part of the liturgy or work of the Cathedral. The Chapel is open every day for personal prayer and meditation.

The Canadian Book of Common Prayer and The English Hymnal are used in the chapel.
