= All Souls' Chapel (Prince Edward Island) =

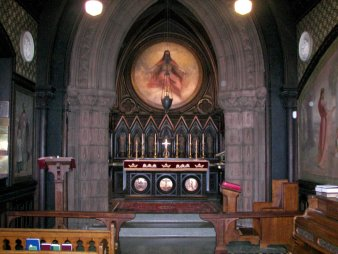
- Interior showing the altar and the sandstone arch
- All Souls' Chapel
- 46.234008°N 63.132656°W
- Location: Charlottetown, Prince Edward Island
- Country: Canada
- Denomination: Anglican Church of Canada
- Website: stpeter.org/chapel

History
- Status: Chapel
- Founded: 1888
- Dedication: All Souls

Architecture
- Functional status: Active
- Architect: William Critchlow Harris
- Style: High Victorian Gothic

Specifications
- Materials: Sandstone

National Historic Site of Canada
- Official name: All Souls Chapel National Historic Site of Canada
- Designated: 1990

Prince Edward Island Heritage Place
- Type: City of Charlottetown Heritage Resource
- Designated: 1979

All Souls' Chapel is a historic chapel attached to St. Peter's Cathedral in Charlottetown, Prince Edward Island, Canada. Built of Prince Edward Island sandstone in the High Victorian Gothic style of architecture, it overlooks Rochford Square.

== History ==
All Souls' Chapel was built in 1888 as a memorial to Father George Hodgson, the first "priest-incumbent" of St. Peter's Cathedral, to a design by the noted ecclesiastical architect William Critchlow Harris. The chapel's walls feature paintings by his brother, Robert Harris. There are three roundels by Robert Harris set in the front of the altar, depicting, respectively, Christ breaking bread at Emmaus on the day of his resurrection; the crucifixion of Christ; and Christ administering the chalice to communicants. The arched reredos is typical of William Harris's style, containing statues of Christ and his apostles. Christ stands in the centre, with St. John and St. James standing to his right and St. Peter to his left, while other apostles, including St. Paul, carry the instruments used to put them to death.

A tabernacle containing the Reserved Sacrament stands behind the altar cross, while to the right of the altar is the credence table on which the bread and wine are placed before the offertory. Around the sanctuary walls are portraits of St. Luke the Evangelist as a memorial to Robert Harris and St. James the Just as a memorial to Canon James Simpson, who played an important role in planning the chapel. The round painting above the reredos is of Christ ascending to Heaven, and has been a treasured icon to generations of cathedral parishioners. The chapel was built by Lowe Brothers of Charlottetown and the woodwork was carved by Messrs Whitlock and Doull.

In 1990, All Souls' Chapel was designated a National Historic Site of Canada. An exterior plaque in recognition of this designation was dedicated at a special ceremony in July 1994. The chapel had already been designated a heritage resource by the City of Charlottetown in 1979.

== See also ==
- St. Peter's Cathedral (Charlottetown)
