= Palma Cathedral =

Cathedral in Spain

Coordinates: 39°34′2.56″N 2°38′53.29″E

Palma Cathedral Cathedral of Santa Maria of Palma
- Catedral de Santa Maria de Palma de Mallorca (Catalan)
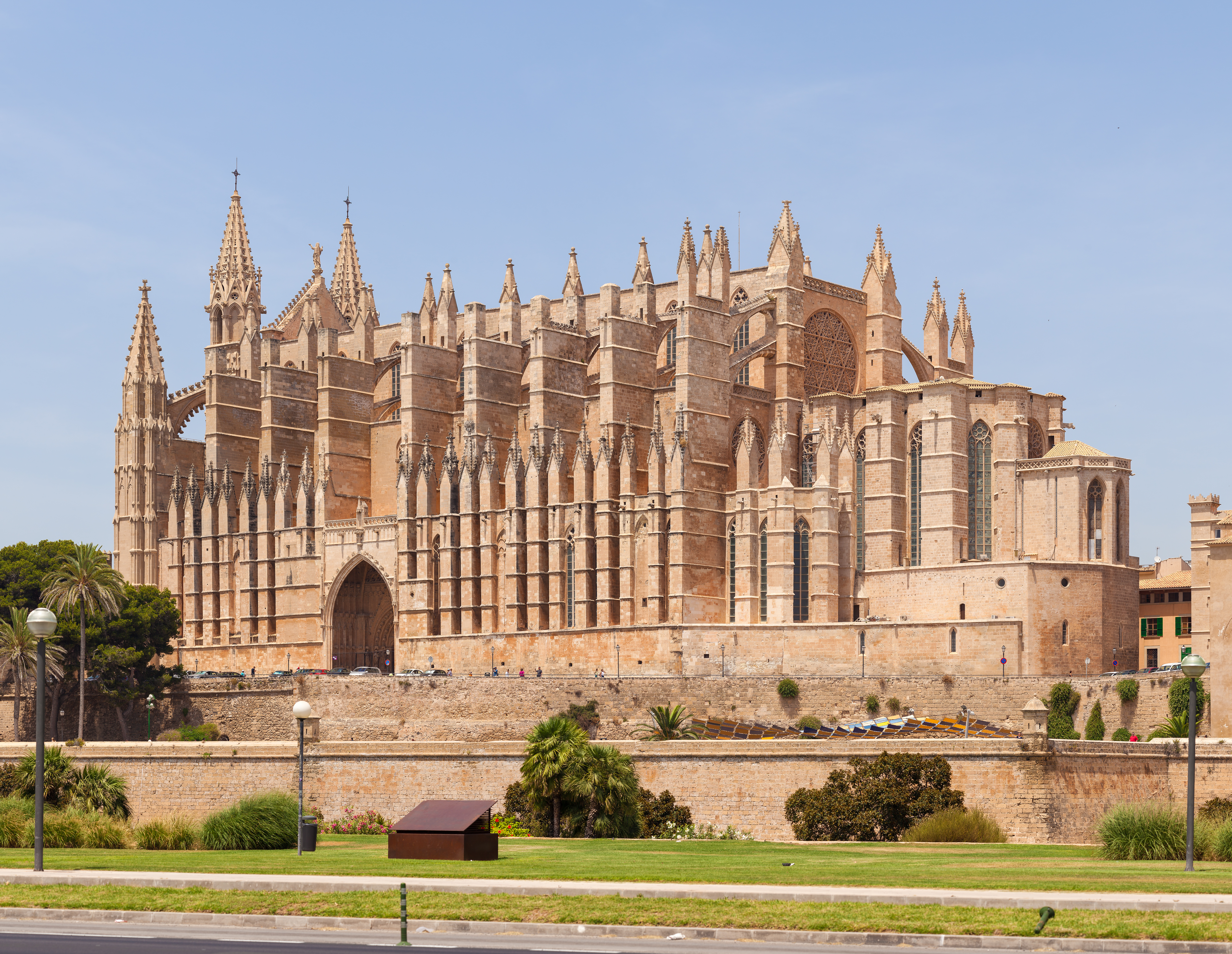
- The Cathedral of Palma viewed from the shoreline

Religion
- Affiliation: Catholic Church

Location
- Location: Palma de Mallorca, Spain
- Interactive map of Palma Cathedral; Cathedral of Santa Maria of Palma

Architecture
- Type: Church
- Style: Gothic
- Groundbreaking: 1229
- Completed: 1601

Specifications
- Direction of façade: North-West
- Length: 121 m
- Width: 40 m

The Cathedral of Santa Maria of Palma, more commonly referred to as La Seu (a title also used by many other churches), is a Gothic Roman Catholic cathedral located in Palma, Mallorca, Spain. It is the Cathedral of the diocese of Mallorca, and is situated on the seashore of Palma, abutting the city walls and situated between the Royal Palace of La Almudaina and the Episcopal Palace of Mallorca. Its rose window, with a diameter of nearly 14 meters, is the second-largest extant Gothic rose window, while its 44-meter high nave is the eighth-highest in the world.

The site of the cathedral was occupied by a mosque under Muslim rule. Construction on the cathedral began shortly after the reconquest of the island in 1229, and continued into the 17th century. Today, the cathedral is Palma's most popular tourist attraction.

== History ==
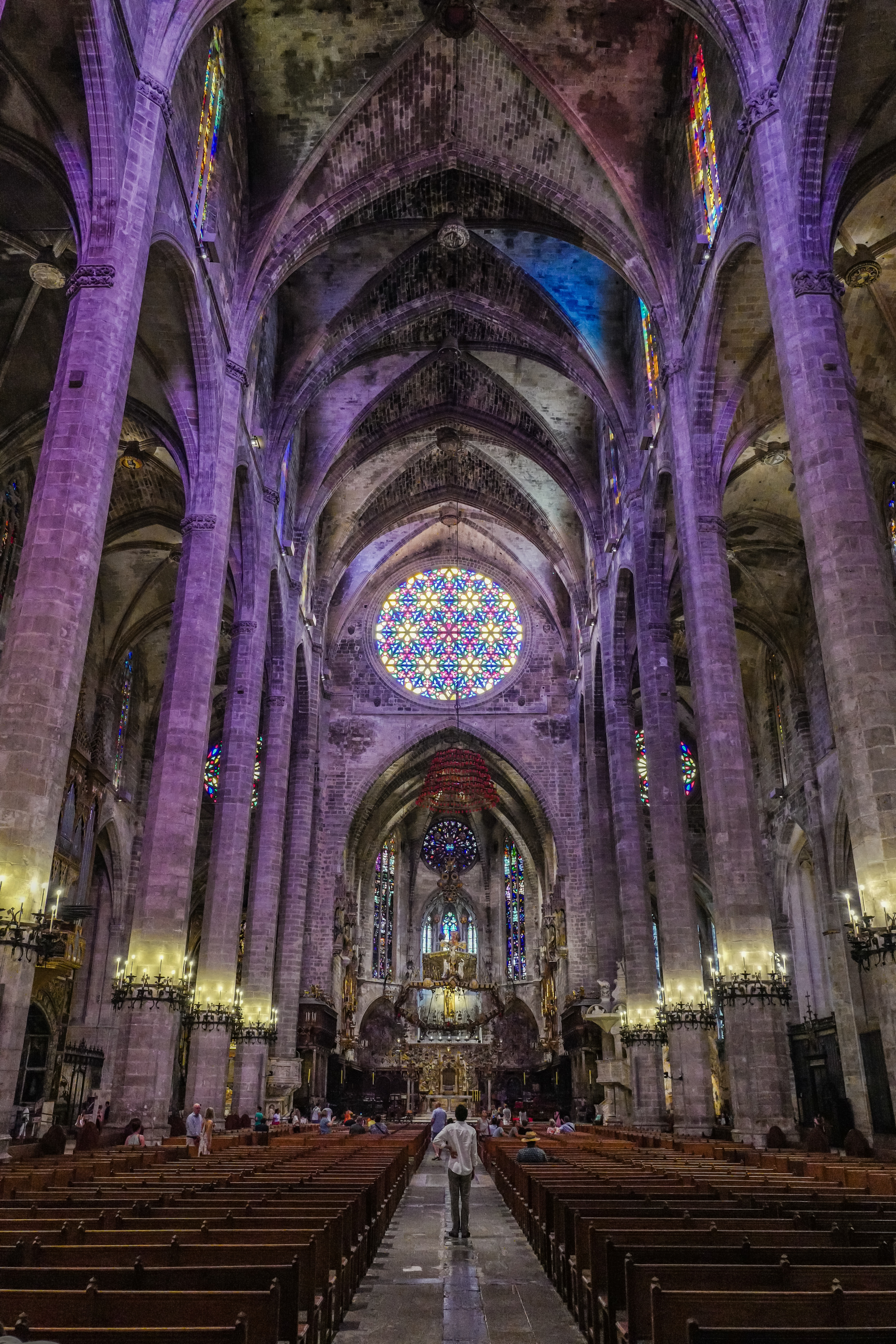
The Cathedral's interior

The city of Palma, then called Madina Mayurqa, was conquered from its Almohad Muslim rulers in 1229, during the first stage of the conquest of Majorca. King James I immediately reestablished the Diocese of Mallorca, and works began on the site of Madina Mayurqa's largest mosque. The site was consecrated by Bishop Pere de Morella in 1230. The earliest still-extant part of the cathedral, completed in 1327, is the Chapel of the Holy Trinity, intended as a burial space for the Monarchs of Mallorca. The last traces of mosque disappeared as the cathedral began to take its current form in 1386. The bell tower was completed in 1498, roughly the same time as the completion of the cathedral's naves and their vaults. Works on the cathedral's ornate rood screen and choir stalls began soon after, with the ensemble being uniquely placed in the center of the nave.

Following the Tridentine Council, the cathedral was richly decorated with Baroque murals and altarpieces. A new chapterhouse was built for the cathedral's growing chapter. Its west front, which originally had a flat top, received a neo-Gothic renovation, which gave the façade its current gable, in the mid-19th century as a result of structural issues.

Antoni Gaudí was invited to begin overseeing restoration works in 1903, and presided over wide-ranging changes in the interior of the cathedral. The works were designed to bring liturgy in the cathedral closer to the people, but have been criticized for the destruction and alteration of Mudejar and Baroque decoration. The choir stalls and screen, originally situated in the center of the nave, were moved to the side walls of the presbytery, and Gaudí designed a large canopy to hang above the altar. Baroque and Gothic altarpieces were removed in order to place an emphasis on the 13th-century Bishop's Chair and tombs of Kings James II and James III of Mallorca. Bricked-up windows were opened to allow for greater natural light, and Gaudí designed several ceramic panels with heraldic motifs for the choir. Gaudí and his collaborators ceased works at the Cathedral in 1914 due to disputes with the local authorities. While his ambitious plans were left incomplete, the influence Gaudí's renovation had on the present appearance of the Cathedral's space was nonetheless massive.

The most recent major works at the cathedral were done between 2001 and 2006 by Mallorcan artist Miquel Barceló. The Chapel of Sant Pere and the Holy Sacrament at the end of the southern nave of the cathedral was comprehensively renovated to portray the Miracle of Loaves and Fishes and Wedding at Cana in a local context. Barceló had the entire apse covered in Italian ceramic, designed new furnishings for the chapel, and replaced the existing stained glass with grisaille stained glass meant to evoke the bottom of the sea. The project was met with strong criticism due to its radical intervention into the historic space and Barceló's generous compensation for the project, but was ultimately finished with the support of Mallorca's bishop.

== Structure ==
The cathedral has three parallel naves with corresponding apses, which most scholars attribute to influence of the roughly contemporary Cathedral of Barcelona and Santa Maria del Mar. It has no transept or ambulatory, and its interior is in no way cruciform. The nave height of 40 meters is the 8th-highest in the world, while the width of the pillars supporting the vaults are the narrowest in the world relative to the vault size: they are 1/12th the width of the vault, to Reims's 1:6 ratio. The cathedral is 121 meters long and 40 meters wide. The cathedral's famous east rose window, widely reproduced on tourist merchandise, is the second-largest Gothic rose window in the world, after Strasbourg's, and spans nearly the entire width of the central nave.

=== Exterior ===
The cathedral's exterior is highly vertical in appearance, making extensive use of flying buttresses and pinnacles. Both sides of the cathedral are built in three ranks: the first and lowest being the sacristy and chapels, the second being the two side naves, and the third and highest enclosing the main nave. The neo-Gothic renovation of the late 19th century accentuated the triangular plan of the interior, wherein the two side naves are only half the height of the central one, by giving the cathedral's west façade a gable with pinnacles. In fact, with the exception of the main portal, the entire west façade was reconstructed in a French-inspired neo-Gothic manner.

=== Interior ===
The Royal Chapel, at the end of the central nave, is the earliest-built section of the cathedral and houses the tombs of Mallorcan Kings James the II and III. They are buried in elaborate marble tombs next to the Episcopal Throne of 1346, made of white marble. Sixteen chapels line the nave, representing nearly all the architectural styles practiced in Mallorca since the Cathedral's construction. These range from the Plateresque Chapel of Sant Jeroni to the Churrigueresque Chapel of Our Lady of the Crown to the aforementioned modernist chapel of Sant Pere. The Cathedral also houses a rich collection of funerary monuments in a variety of styles. The choir stalls, moved and altered by Gaudí, number 110 and are an excellent example of Catalan Gothic woodwork.

== See also ==
- Catholic Church in Spain
- List of highest church naves
