= List of highest church naves =

The nave is the central approach to the high altar, the main body of the church, in Romanesque and Gothic Christian abbey, cathedral basilica and church architecture. "Nave" (Medieval Latin navis, "ship") was probably suggested by the keel shape of its vaulting. The nave of a church, whether Romanesque, Gothic or Classical, extends from the entry (which may have a separate vestibule, the narthex) to the chancel and is flanked by lower aisles separated from the nave by an arcade.

Note: Due to lack of documented verification, the lower part of the list is incomplete and probably has missing cathedrals.

List of highest church naves
#	Cathedral/Church	Nave height	City	Country	Denomination	Notes	Image
1	Beauvais Cathedral	47 m (154 ft)	Beauvais	France	Catholic	Only one bay of the nave was built, but choir and transepts were completed to the same height.	
2	St. Peter's Basilica	46 m (151 ft); 45 m (148 ft)	Vatican City	Vatican City	Catholic		
3=	Florence Cathedral	45 m (148 ft)	Florence	Italy	Catholic		
3=	Milan Cathedral	45 m (148 ft)	Milan	Italy	Catholic		
3=	Sagrada Família	45 m (148 ft)	Barcelona	Spain	Catholic	Still under construction. Vaults of the crossing and the apse reach 60 and 75 metres respectively.	
3=	Santa Chiara	~45 m (148 ft)^{[a]} ~33.5 m (110 ft)^{[b]}	Naples	Italy	Catholic		
7	San Petronio Basilica	44.24 m (145.1 ft)	Bologna	Italy	Catholic		
8	Palma Cathedral	44 m (144 ft)	Palma	Spain	Catholic	Pillars sustaining vaults are the narrowest in the world; measuring 1/12 of vault width (at the Reims Cathedral, pillars are 1/6 of vault width).	
8	People's Salvation Cathedral	44 m (144 ft)	Bucharest	Romania	Eastern Orthodox (Romanian Orthodox)	Tallest and largest (by volume) Eastern Orthodox church building in the world.	
10	Cologne Cathedral	43.35 m (142.2 ft)	Cologne	Germany	Catholic	Highest height to width ratio of any nave.	
11	Amiens Cathedral	42.3 m (139 ft)	Amiens	France	Catholic		
12	Málaga Cathedral	41.79 m (137.1 ft)	Málaga	Spain	Catholic	All three naves reach the same height, the highest among the Andalusian cathedrals.	
13	Metz Cathedral	41.41 m (135.9 ft)	Metz	France	Catholic		
14	St Bartholomew's Church	41.15 m (135.0 ft)	Brighton	United Kingdom	Anglican (Church of England)		
15=	Ulm Münster	41 m (135 ft)	Ulm	Germany	Protestant (Evangelical Church in Germany)		
15=	Narbonne Cathedral	41 m (135 ft); 40.1 m (132 ft)	Narbonne	France	Catholic	Only the great choir of this French Gothic church is completely built.	
17	Cathedral Basilica of Our Lady Aparecida	40 m (130 ft)	Aparecida	Brazil	Catholic		
18	St. Mary's Church	38.5 m (126 ft)	Lübeck	Germany	Protestant (Lutheran)	Highest brick vault in the world.	
19	Reims Cathedral	37.95 m (124.5 ft)	Reims	France	Catholic	Holds the world record for statues: 2303 stone figurines are represented on it.	
20	Cathedral of St. John the Divine	37.7 m (124 ft)	New York City	United States	Anglican (Episcopal Church)		
21=	Cathedral of La Plata	37.5 m (123 ft)	La Plata	Argentina	Catholic		
21=	Nantes Cathedral	37.5 m (123 ft)	Nantes	France	Catholic		
23=	Bourges Cathedral	37 m (121 ft)	Bourges	France	Catholic		
23=	Chartres Cathedral	37 m (121 ft); 36.55 m (119.9 ft)	Chartres	France	Catholic		
23=	Basilica of St. Thérèse	37 m (121 ft)	Lisieux	France	Catholic		
23=	St. Nicholas	37 m (121 ft)	Wismar	Germany	Protestant (Lutheran)		
23=	Cathedral of Christ the Saviour	37 m (121 ft)	Moscow	Russia	Eastern Orthodox (Russian Orthodox)		
28	Liverpool Cathedral	36.54 m (119.9 ft)	Liverpool	United Kingdom	Anglican (Church of England)		
29=	Seville Cathedral	36 m (118 ft)	Seville	Spain	Catholic	Largest medieval Gothic church. The vaults at the crossing reach 40 m.	
29=	Tournai Cathedral	36 m (118 ft)	Tournai	Belgium	Catholic	Highest nave in the Low Countries	
31	New Cathedral	35.4 m (116 ft)	Salamanca	Spain	Catholic		
32=	Notre Dame	35 m (115 ft); 34 m (112 ft)	Paris	France	Catholic		
32=	St. George's Church	35 m (115 ft)	Wismar	Germany	Protestant (Lutheran)		
34	Granada Cathedral	34.5 m (113 ft)	Granada	Spain	Catholic		
35=	Basilica of Saint-Quentin	34 m (112 ft)	Saint-Quentin	France	Catholic		
35=	Cathedral of Our Lady of Guadalupe	34 m (112 ft)	Zamora de Hidalgo	Mexico	Catholic	Still under construction (work began in 1898). Known as the "Incomplete Cathedral" ("La Catedral Inconclusa").	
35=	Girona Cathedral	34 m (112 ft)	Girona	Spain	Catholic	Widest Gothic nave in the world, 22.98 m, and lower ratio high/wide in Gothic architecture	
35=	Church of Our Lady of the Snows	34 m (112 ft)	Prague	Czech Republic	Catholic	39 m (128 ft) high nave destroyed during Hussite Wars	
39	Chiesa di San Nicolò	33.35 m (109.4 ft)	Treviso	Italy	Catholic		
40=	Le Mans Cathedral	33 m (108 ft)	Le Mans	France	Catholic		
40=	Segovia Cathedral	33 m (108 ft)	Segovia	Spain	Catholic		
40=	St. Vitus Cathedral	33 m (108 ft)	Prague	Czech Republic	Catholic		
40=	Speyer Cathedral	33 m (108 ft)	Speyer	Germany	Catholic	Highest Romanesque vault	
40=	St. Mary's Church	32.95 m (108.1 ft)	Stralsund	Germany	Protestant (Lutheran)	World's highest building from 1625 to 1647 (151 m). Today 104 m.	
45=	St. Mary's Church	32.5 m (107 ft)	Stargard Szczeciński	Poland	Catholic		
45=	Batalha Monastery	32.5 m (107 ft)	Batalha	Portugal	Catholic		
47=	Aachen Cathedral	32 m (105 ft)	Aachen	Germany	Catholic	Height of the gothic choir.	
47=	Bayeux Cathedral	32 m (105 ft)	Bayeux	France	Catholic		
47=	Strasbourg Cathedral	32 m (105 ft)	Strasbourg	France	Catholic		
50=	Ely Cathedral	32 m (105 ft)	Ely	United Kingdom	Anglican (Church of England)		
50	Glasgow Cathedral	32 m (105 ft)	Glasgow	United Kingdom	Protestant (Church of Scotland)		
50=	Magdeburg Cathedral	32 m (105 ft)	Magdeburg	Germany	Protestant (Lutheran)		
50=	Santa Maria del Mar	32 m (105 ft)	Barcelona	Spain	Catholic	Greatest separation between pillars in Gothic architecture (15 m)	
50=	Engelbrekt Church	32 m (105 ft)	Stockholm	Sweden	Protestant (Lutheran)		
55	Regensburg Cathedral	31.85 m (104.5 ft)	Regensburg	Germany	Catholic		
56	Cathedral of Our Lady of the Angels	31.7 m (104 ft)	Los Angeles	United States	Catholic		
57=	St. Martin's Cathedral	31.5 m (103 ft)	Utrecht	Netherlands	Protestant (Protestant Church in the Netherlands)	Ruin. The nave collapsed during a storm in 1674.	
57=	St. Mary's Church	31.5 m (103 ft)	Rostock	Germany	Protestant (Lutheran)		
59=	St Bavo's Cathedral	31.1 m (102 ft)	Ghent	Belgium	Catholic		
59=	Westminster Abbey	31 m (102 ft)	London	United Kingdom	Anglican (Church of England)		
59=	Munich Frauenkirche	31 m (102 ft)	Munich	Germany	Catholic		
59=	York Minster	31 m (102 ft)	York	United Kingdom	Anglican (Church of England)		
59=	St. Olaf's Church	31 m (102 ft)	Tallinn	Estonia	Protestant (Baptist)		
59=	Washington National Cathedral	31 m (102 ft)	Washington, D.C.	United States	Anglican (Episcopal Church)		
65=	Basilica of the National Shrine of the Immaculate Conception	30.5 m (100 ft)	Washington, D.C.	United States	Catholic		
65=	Riverside Church	30.5 m (100 ft)	New York City	United States	N/A (Interdenominational)		
67=	Archbasilica of Saint John Lateran	30 m (98 ft)	Rome	Italy	Catholic		
67=	Pavia Cathedral	30 m (98 ft)	Pavia	Italy	Catholic		
67=	St. Peter's Church	30 m (98 ft)	Riga	Latvia	Protestant (Lutheran)		
70=	St. Bavo Church	29 m (95 ft)	Haarlem	Netherlands	Protestant (Protestant Church in the Netherlands)	The nave is covered by a 16th-century wooden net vault.	
70=	Saint Thomas Church	29 m (95 ft)	New York City	United States	Anglican (Episcopal Church)		
70	St. John's Cathedral	29 m (95 ft)	's-Hertogenbosch	Netherlands	Catholic		
73=	St. Catherine's Church	28 m (92 ft)	Brielle	Netherlands	Protestant (Protestant Church in the Netherlands)		
73=	St Paul's Cathedral	28 m (92 ft)	London	United Kingdom	Anglican (Church of England)		
73=	Alexander Nevsky Cathedral	28 m (92 ft)	Sofia	Bulgaria	Eastern Orthodox (Bulgarian Orthodox)		
73=	Church of the Assumption of Our Lady and Saint John the Baptist	28 m (92 ft)	Kutná Hora	Czech Republic	Catholic		
73=	Cathedral of Our Lady (Antwerp)	28 m (92 ft)	Antwerp	Belgium	Catholic		
73=	Cathedral of the Holy Cross and Saint Eulalia	28 m (92 ft)	Barcelona	Spain	Catholic		
79	Grace Cathedral	27.7 m (91 ft)	San Francisco	United States	Anglican (Episcopal Church)		
80	Lancing College Chapel	27.4 m (90 ft)	Lancing	United Kingdom	Anglican (Church of England)		
81=	Upper Church	27 m (89 ft)	Kampen	Netherlands	Protestant (Protestant Church in the Netherlands)		
81=	Uppsala Cathedral	27 m (89 ft)	Uppsala	Sweden	Protestant (Lutheran)		
83	Der Aa Church	26 m (85 ft)	Groningen	Netherlands	N/A	No longer operating as a church.	
84	Salisbury Cathedral	25.5 m (84 ft)	Salisbury	United Kingdom	Anglican (Church of England)		
85=	De Krijtberg	25 m (82 ft)	Amsterdam	Netherlands	Catholic		
85=	Lincoln Cathedral	25 m (82 ft)	Lincoln	United Kingdom	Anglican (Church of England)		
87	Cathedral of St. John the Evangelist	24.3 m (80 ft)	Spokane	United States	Anglican (Episcopal Church)		
88=	Church of Our Lady	24 m (79 ft)	Dordrecht	Netherlands	Protestant (Protestant Church in the Netherlands)		
88=	Canterbury Cathedral	24 m (79 ft)	Canterbury	United Kingdom	Anglican (Church of England)	Nave with a crossing height of 92 feet (28 metres)	
88=	Turku Cathedral	24 m (79 ft)	Turku	Finland	Protestant (Lutheran)		
91	East Liberty Presbyterian Church	22.86 m (75 ft)	Pittsburgh	United States	Protestant (Presbyterian)		
92	All Saints Cathedral	19.5 m (64 ft)	Halifax	Canada	Anglican (Anglican Church of Canada)		

== See also ==
- Description of the term "nave"
- List of largest church buildings
- List of tallest church buildings
- List of tallest domes

== Notes ==
a. Height to the top of the roof.
b. Height up to the base of the roof trusses.
