= All Saints Cathedral (Halifax, Nova Scotia) =

Cathedral Church of All Saints
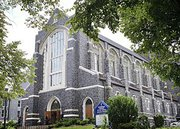
- Cathedral Church of All Saints
- 44°38′25.60″N 63°34′46.85″W
- Location: 1330 Cathedral Lane, Halifax, Nova Scotia
- Country: Canada
- Denomination: Anglican Church of Canada
- Website: cathedralchurchofallsaints.com

Architecture
- Architect: Ralph Adams Cram
- Style: Gothic Revival
- Groundbreaking: 1907
- Completed: 1910

Specifications
- Length: 255 feet
- Width: 86 feet
- Height: 68 feet

Administration
- Province: Canada
- Diocese: Nova Scotia and Prince Edward Island

Clergy
- Bishop: Sandra Fyfe
- Dean: Paul Smith
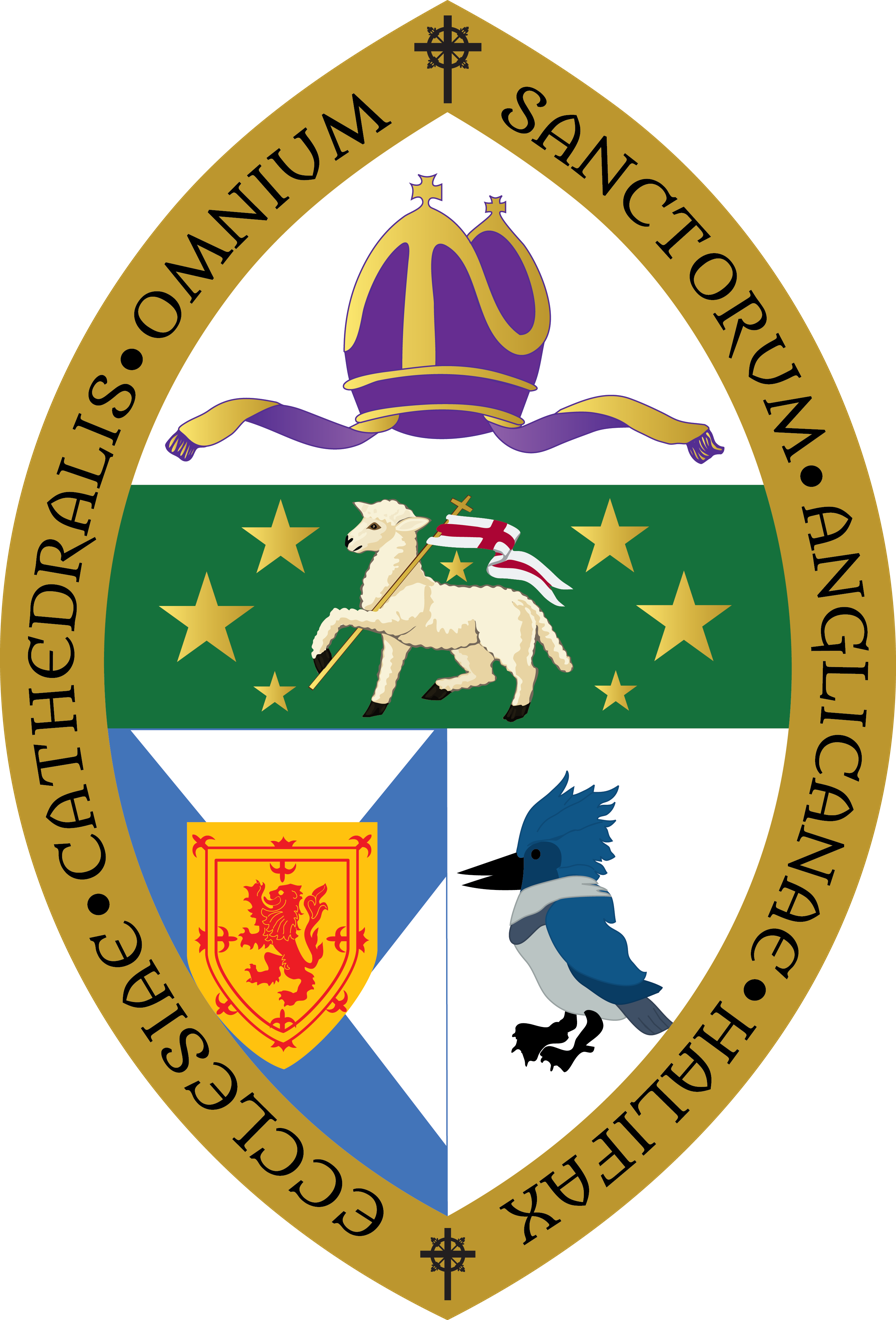

The Cathedral Church of All Saints, also known as All Saints Cathedral, is a cathedral church of the Anglican Church of Canada in Halifax, Nova Scotia.

It is the cathedral for the Diocese of Nova Scotia and Prince Edward Island. There is an additional cathedral, St. Peter's, in Charlottetown, Prince Edward Island, owing to the diocese unusually containing two civil provinces.

All Saints Cathedral is located on Cathedral Lane (formerly Martello Street) in the South End of the Halifax Peninsula. Built to a neo-Gothic design by Ralph Adams Cram of Cram, Goodhue & Ferguson (of Boston and New York), the stone structure, minus the central tower which had been the design's most striking feature, was opened in 1910. The building is 255 feet (78 m) long; the nave is 68 feet (21 m) high, and the chancel is 26 feet (7.9 m) wide.

== History ==
=== Background ===
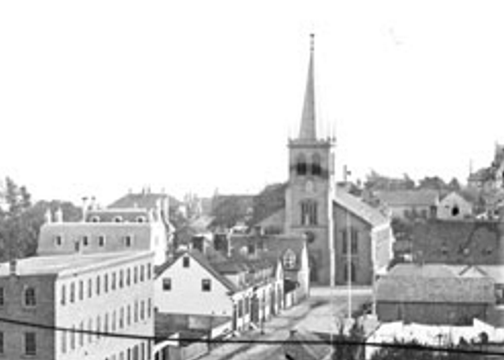
St. Luke's Pro Cathedral, c. 1890. Destroyed in 1905, All Saints was built to replace the pro-cathedral.

=== Opening ===
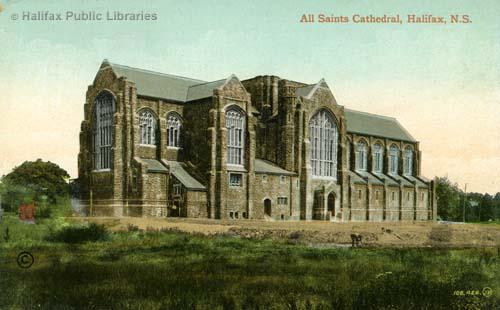
Depiction of the cathedral in 1911, shortly after its completion

=== First World War Memorial Window ===
Stained glass in the Cathedral commemorates the men and women of the Diocese who died in World War I.

=== Philip Bent ===
The sword of Philip Bent, who was killed in 1917, and is the only person born in Halifax to be awarded a Victoria Cross, is displayed in the cathedral.

== Design ==
=== Pipe organ ===
The Cathedral Organ was built originally in 1910 by Casavant of St Hyacinthe, Québec, and rebuilt by the British firm of Hill, Norman and Beard in 1961. In 2011, the original console was upgraded by Casavant and now includes 250 memories for its pistons, is MIDI capable, and can record performances to play later. Another advantage of the new console is that it is moveable so it can rest in its original intended location during services but be optimally re-positioned as required during choral concerts and organ recitals and performances. Also, during this recent upgrade the console was prepared with some additional stops as well as an antiphonal section for eventual installation in the Cathedral Narthex. Consisting of four manuals and seventy-five stops, the organ is the largest east of Montreal and serves admirably for service-playing and is also an impressive recital instrument. The organ has been played by many international performers.

== See also ==
- Dean of Nova Scotia
- List of cathedrals in Canada
- List of highest church naves
- List of longest church buildings in the world
- List of oldest buildings and structures in Halifax, Nova Scotia
