= La Fonderie, Brussels Museum of Industry and Labour =

Museum of industrial history in Brussels, Belgium

- La Fonderie, Musée bruxellois des Industries et du Travail (French); La Fonderie, Brussels Museum voor Industrie en Arbeid (Dutch)
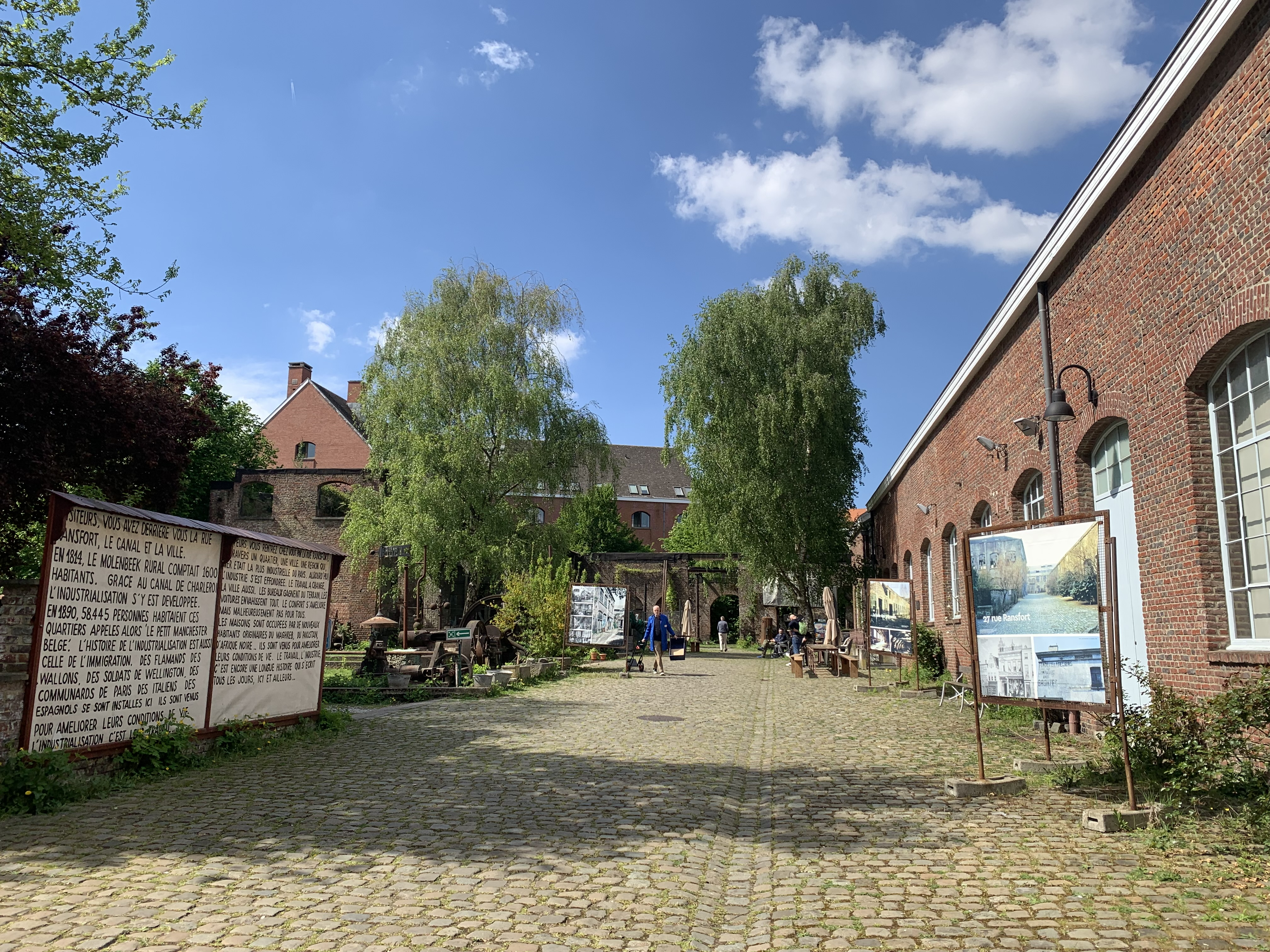
- Entrance of the museum
- Interactive fullscreen map
- Location: Rue Ransfort / Ransfortstraat 27, 1080 Molenbeek-Saint-Jean, Brussels-Capital Region, Belgium
- Coordinates: 50°51′10″N 4°20′8″E
- Type: History museum
- Public transit access: 5 Comte de Flandre/Graaf van Vlaanderen
- Website: www.lafonderie.be

La Fonderie, Brussels Museum of Industry and Labour (French: La Fonderie, Musée bruxellois des Industries et du Travail; Dutch: La Fonderie, Brussels Museum voor Industrie en Arbeid) is a museum of industrial history in Brussels, Belgium. It collects objects, documents and oral history on the city's industrial past, and showcases the working history of Brussels. It is managed as a non-profit organisation, focusing on analysing and exhibiting the economic and social history of the Brussels Region. It publishes a magazine, organises guided tours, and provides educational activities. La Fonderie also houses a documentation centre open to the public.

The museum is located at 27, rue Ransfort/Ransfortstraat in Molenbeek-Saint-Jean, on the site of the former foundry of the Compagnie des Bronzes de Bruxelles (1854–1979), close to the Brussels–Charleroi Canal.

== Exhibits ==
The museum presents four key industry sectors that have created or transformed products made in Brussels: the metal industry, woodworking, textile manufacturing, and food processing. Each module includes two showcase machines that represent the technology and the companies that made and used them, as well as the working conditions. The exhibits are drawn mainly from the museum's own collections, but also from those of partner institutions and private collectors. Since 2001, the permanent exhibition has been housed in the 300 m^{2} (3,200 sq ft) lathe room of the former Compagnie des Bronzes. Temporary exhibitions are shown on the top floor of the museum, and additional exhibits of various industry sectors are planned for the coming years.

La Fonderie supplements the exhibitions of Brussels' major museums. The bilingual French and Dutch exhibition is aimed at anyone interested in sociology, technology, as well as local history. An English manual is available, which includes translations of the exhibits' captions.

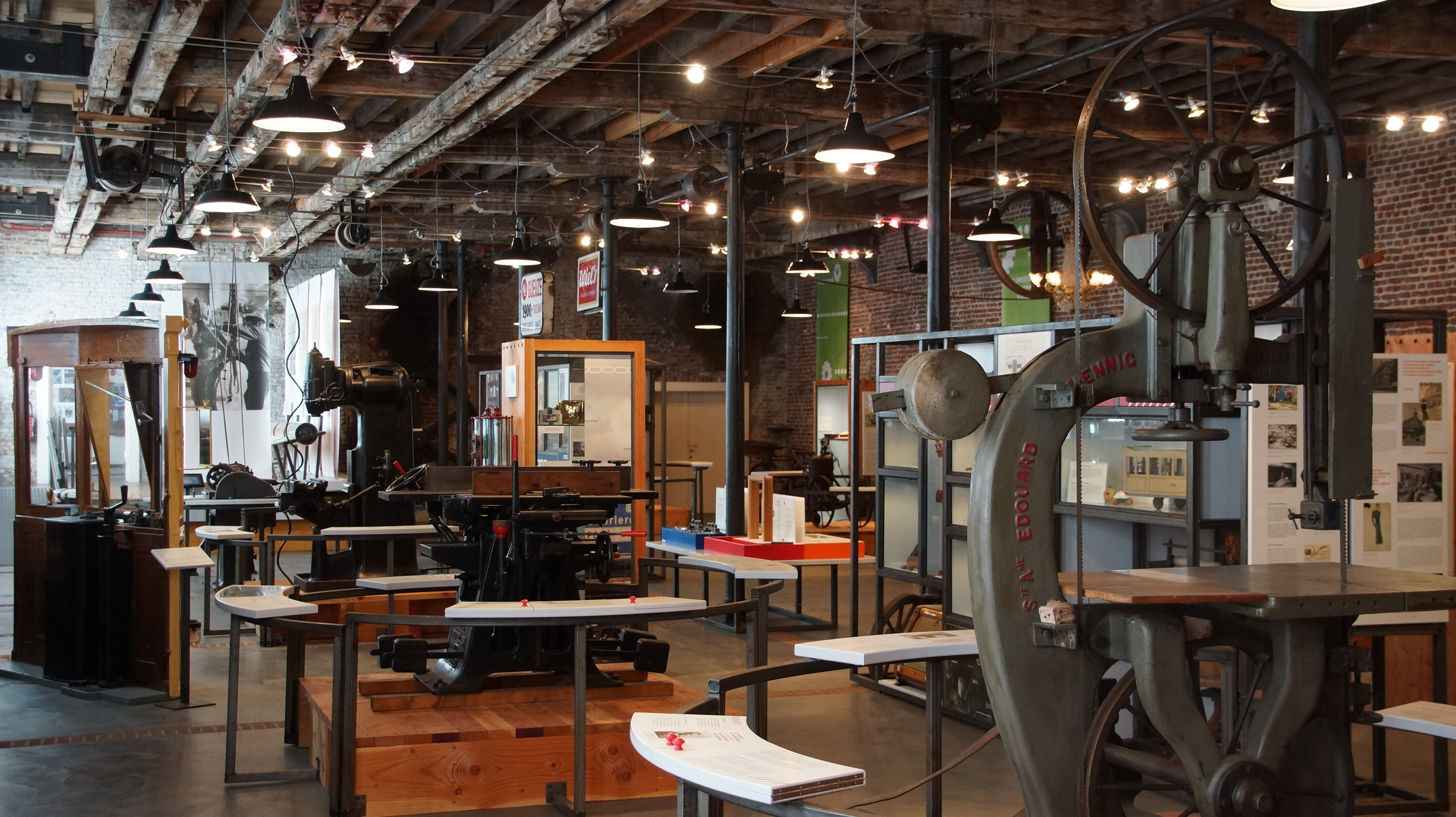
Interior view

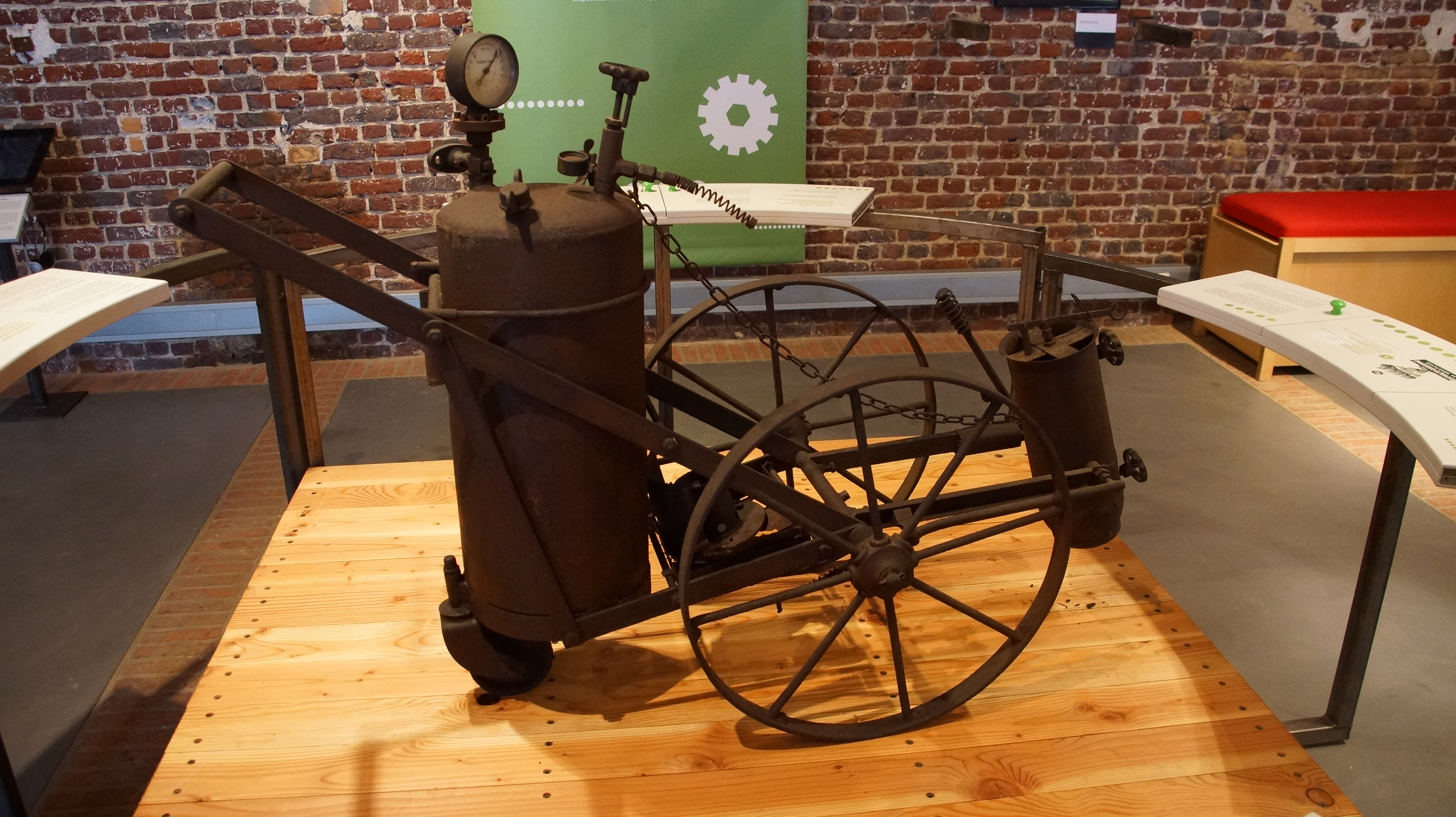
Asphalt machine

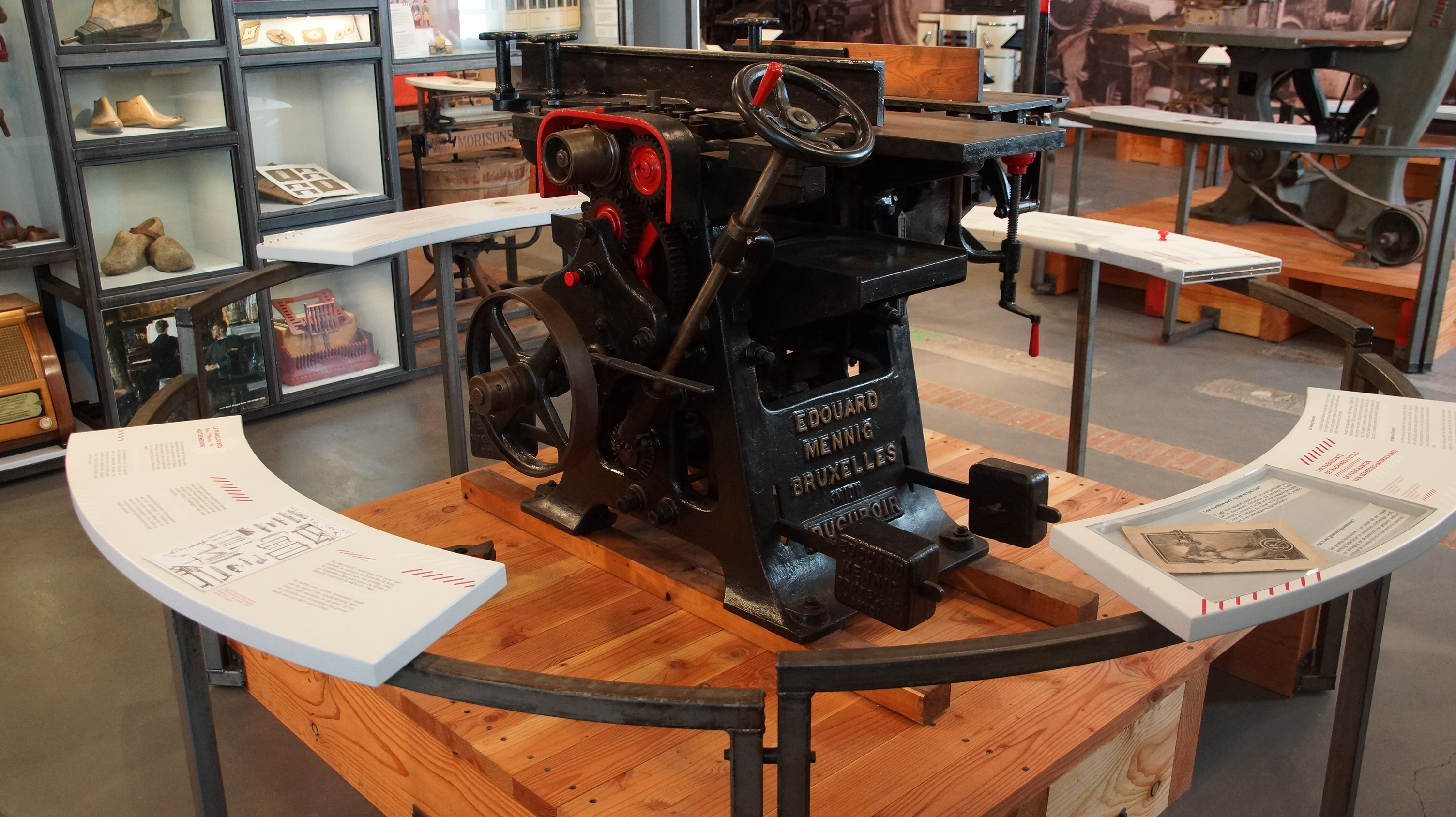
Woodworking machine of Edouard Mennig

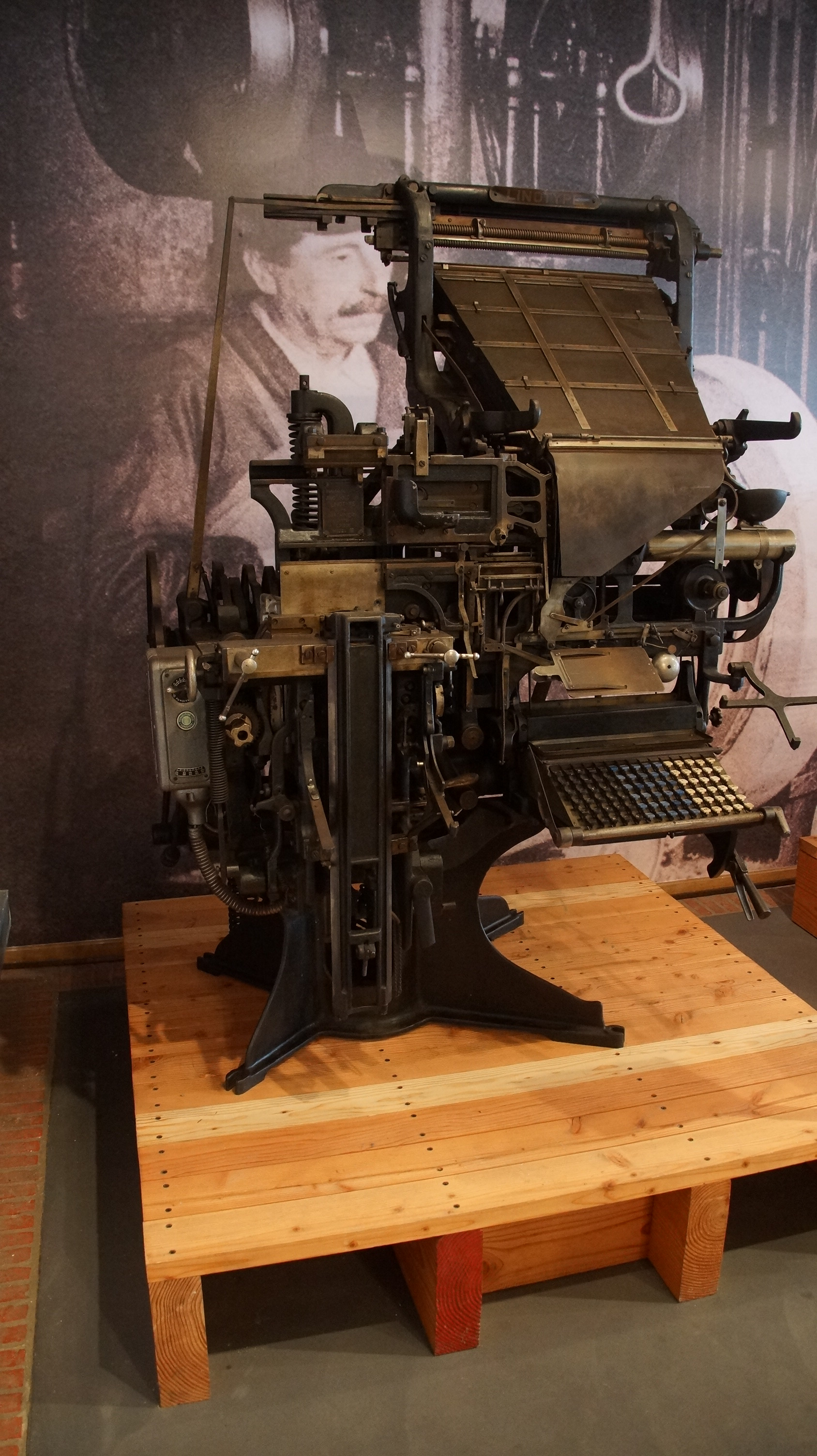
Linotype machine

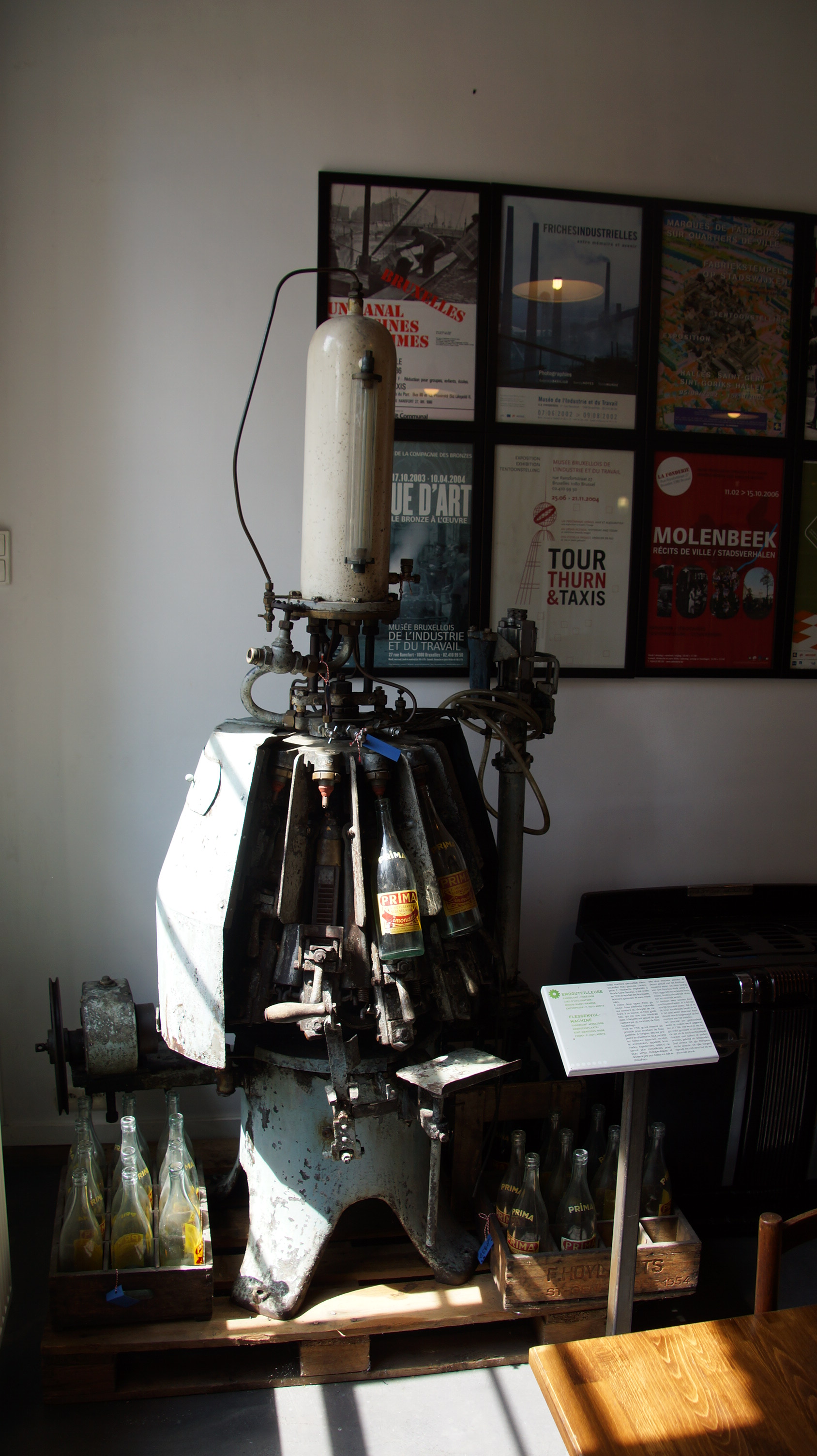
Bottle filling machine

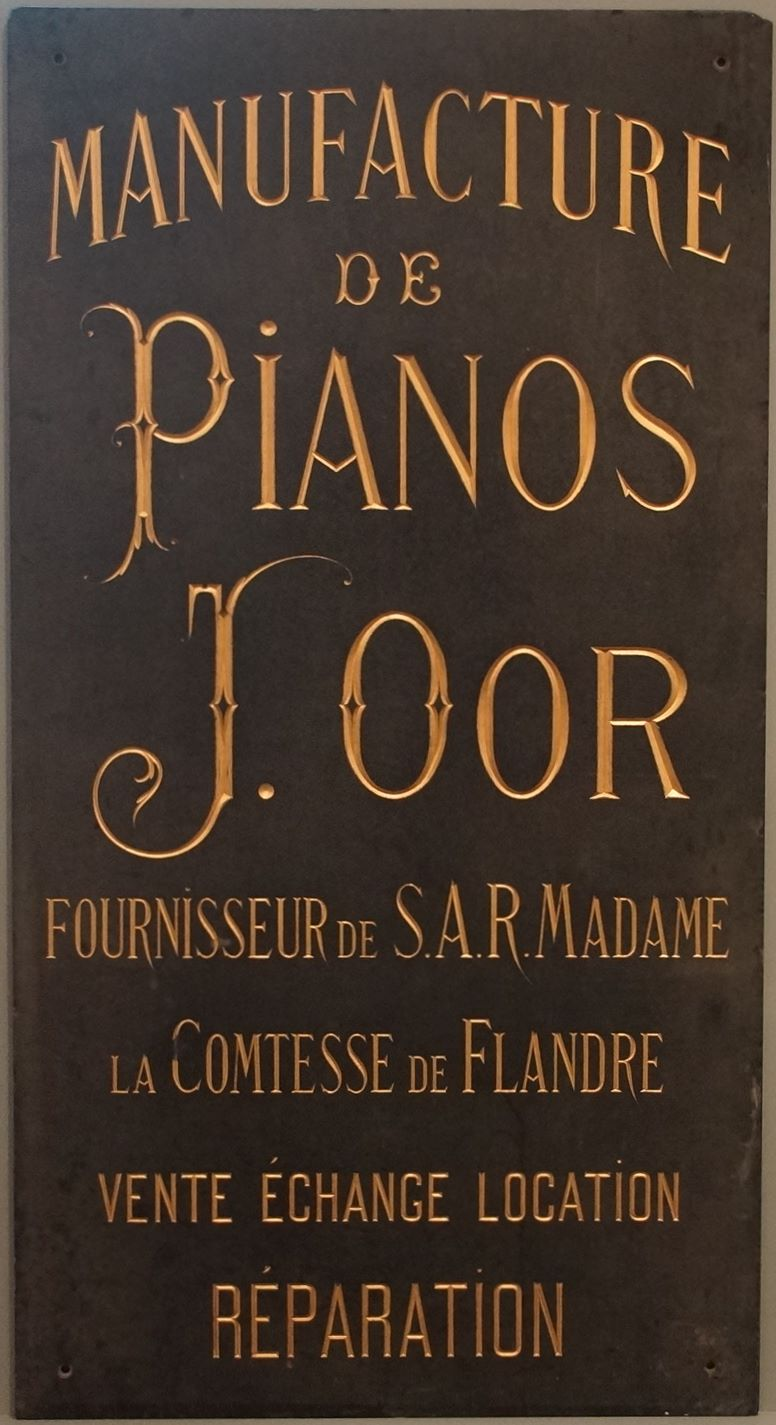
Piano maker J. Oor

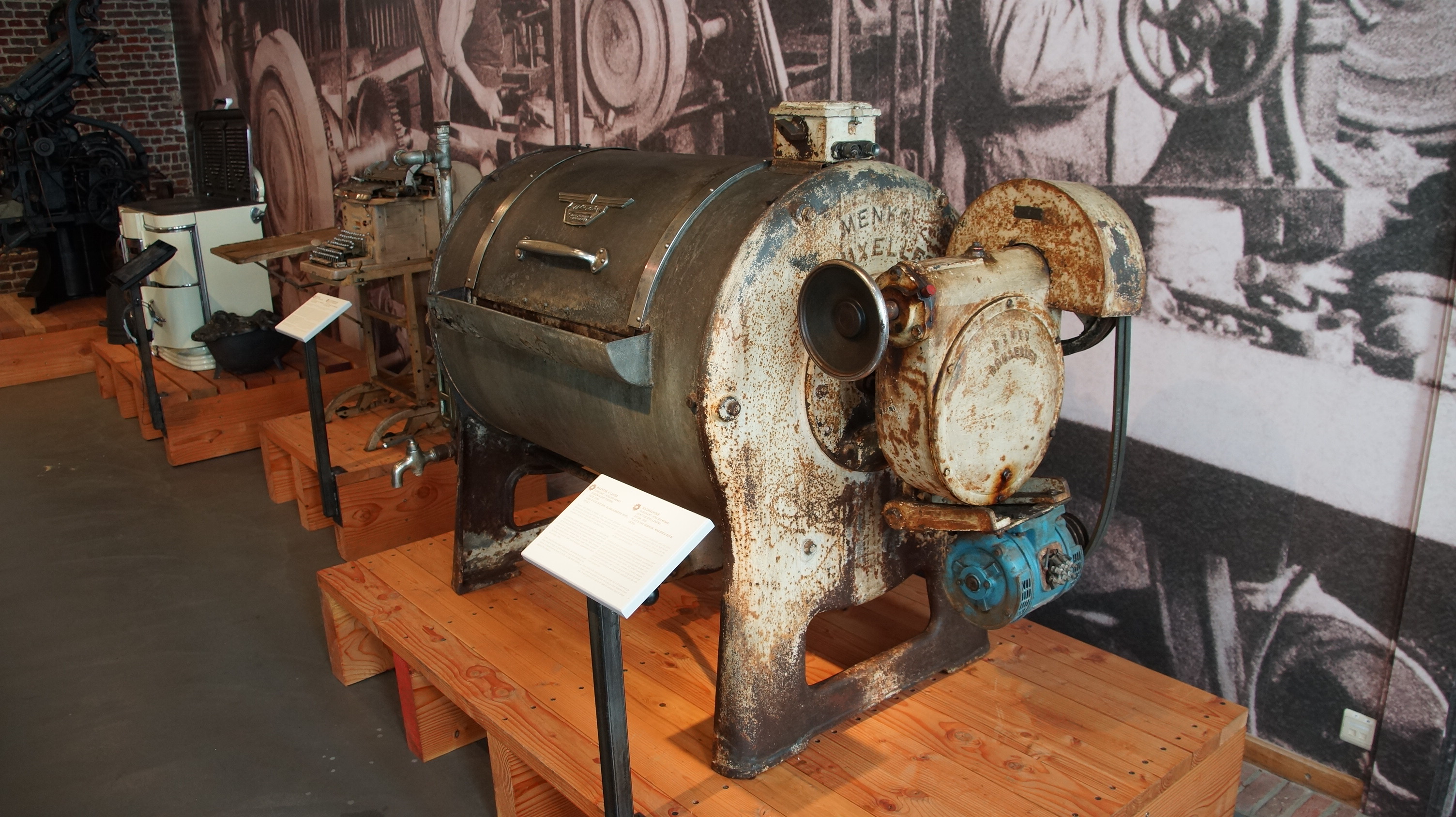
Washing machine by Atelier Menko

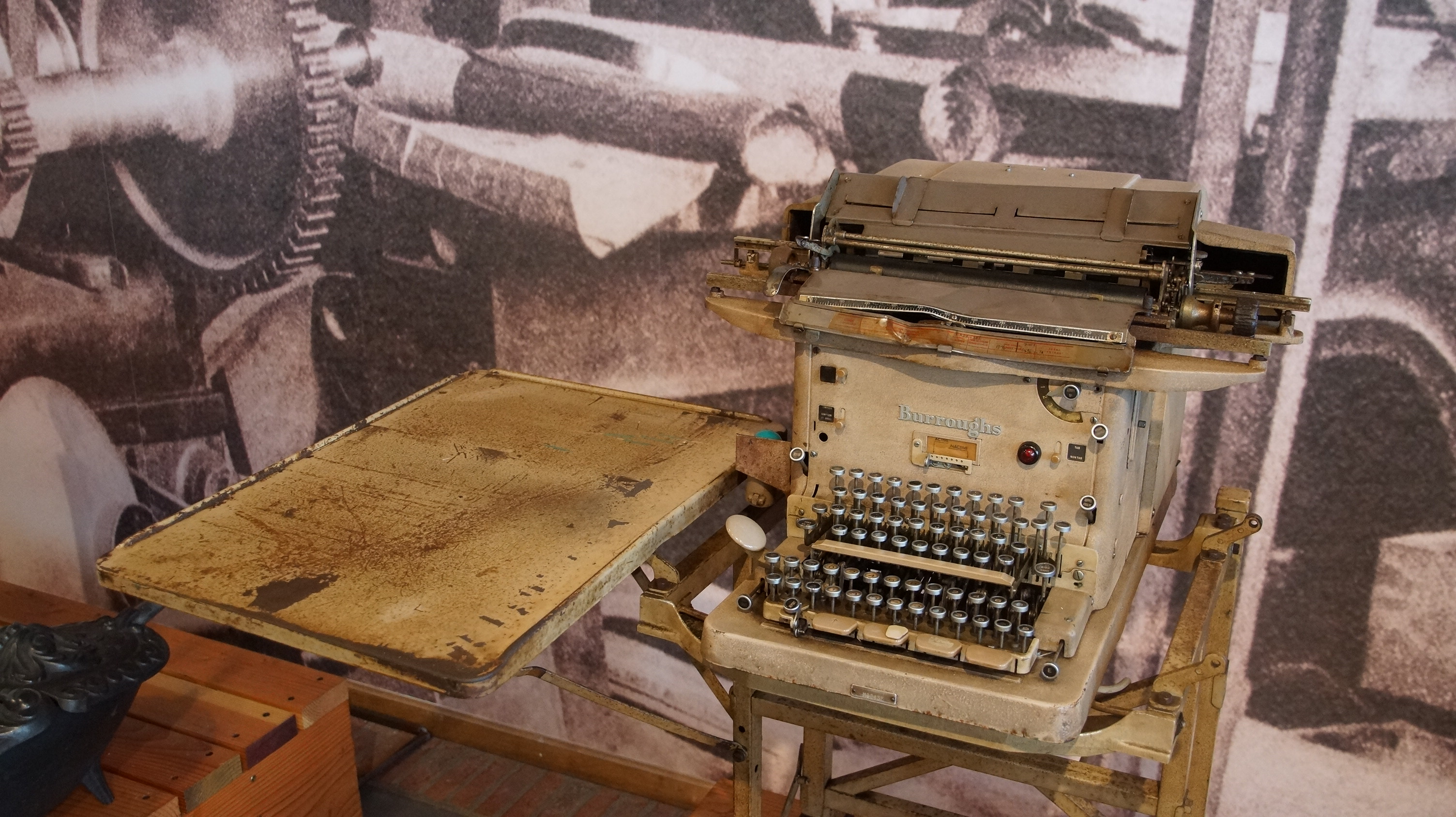
Adding machine by Burroughs

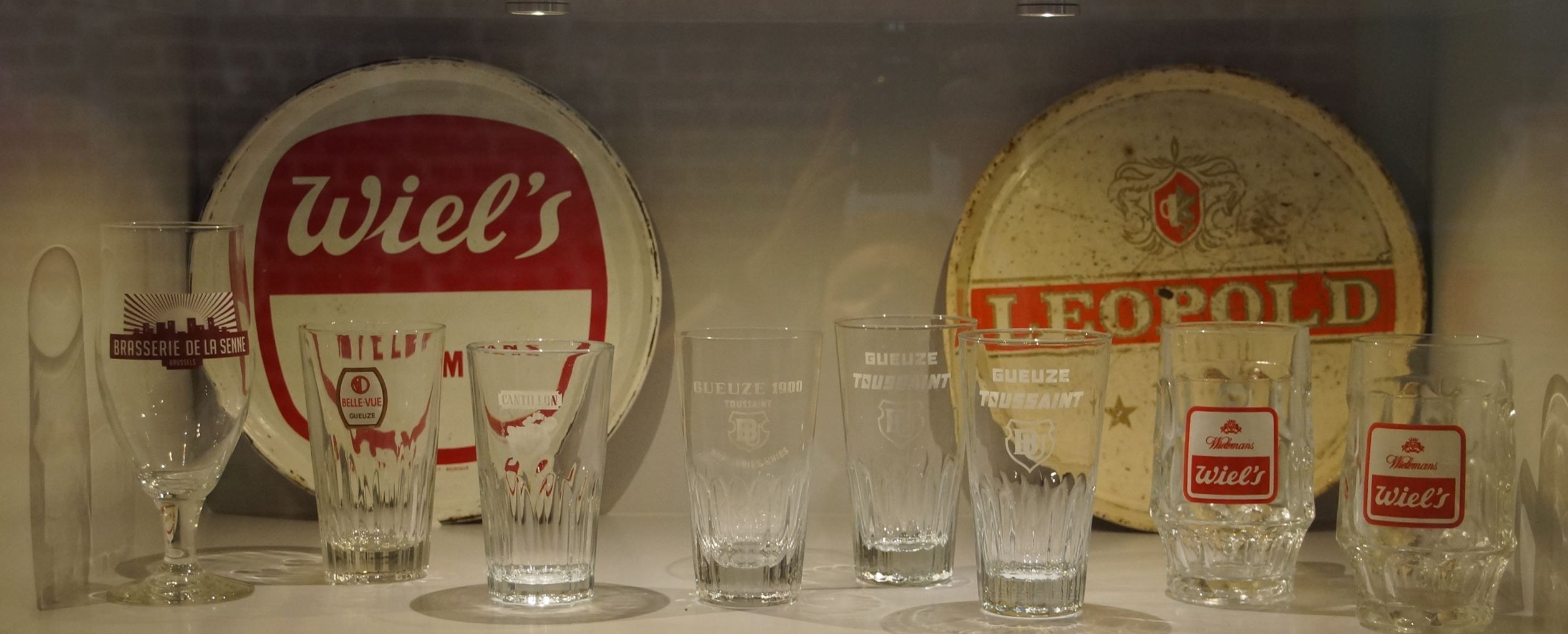
Wiel's beer glasses

== See also ==
- List of museums in Brussels
- History of Brussels
- Culture of Belgium
- Belgium in the long nineteenth century
