= Edouard Mennig =

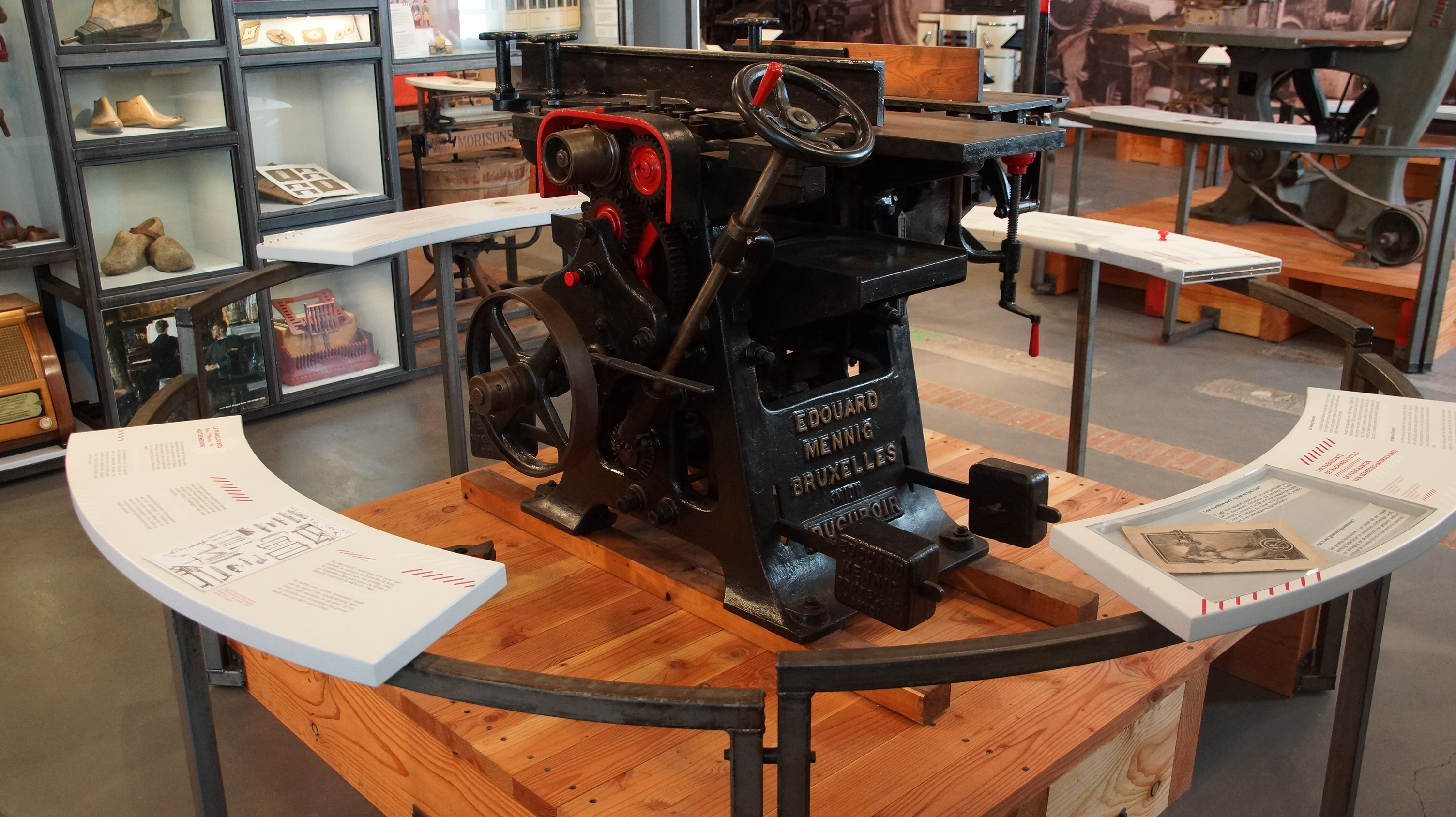
Woodworking machine by Edouard Mennig exhibited at La Fonderie, Brussels Museum of Industry and Labour

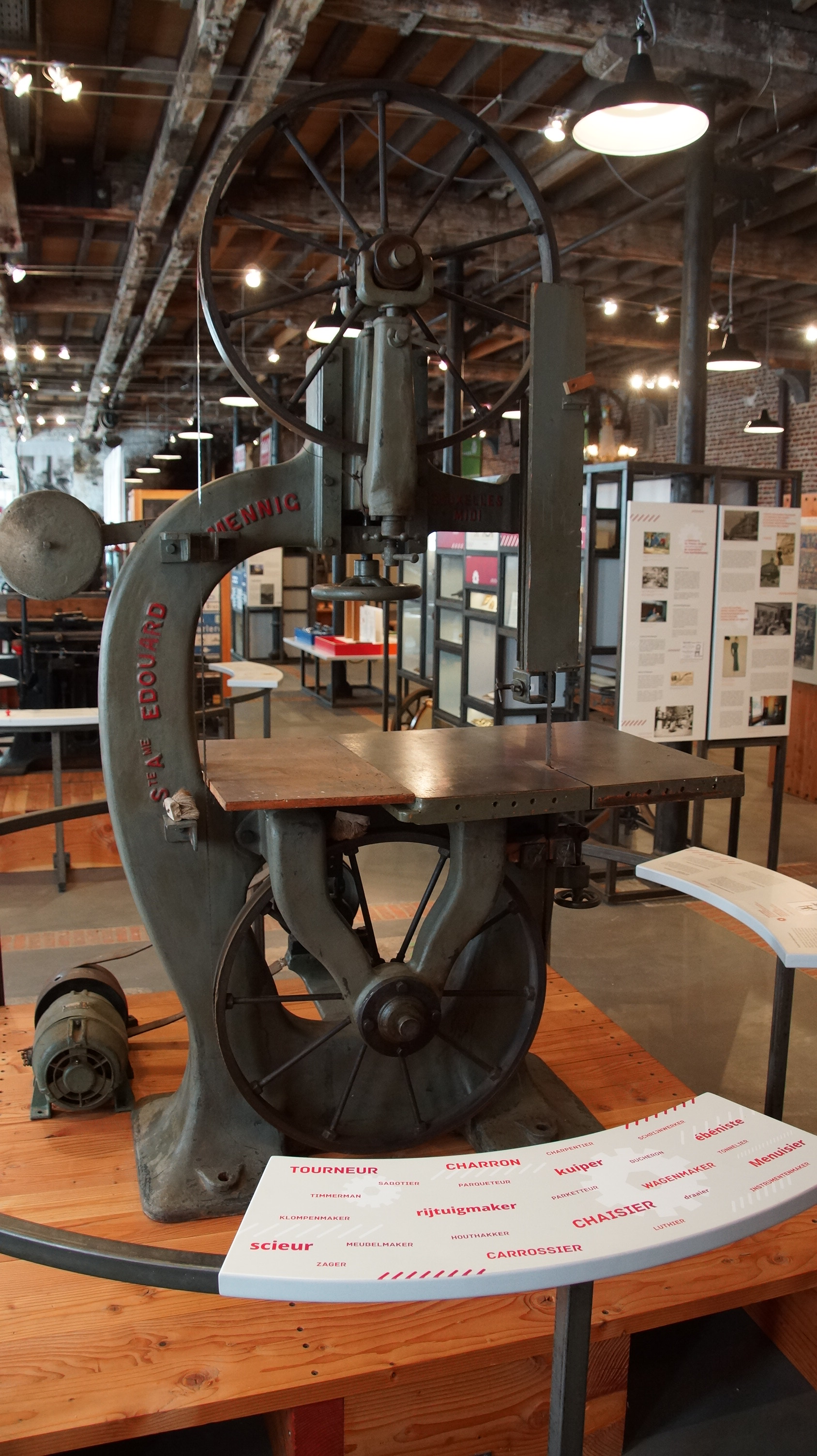
Band saw by Edouard Mennig exhibited at La Fonderie, Brussels Museum of Industry and Labour

The Société Anonyme des Ateliers Edouard Mennig was a Belgic manufacturer of machine tools, especially for woodworking.

== History ==
Edouard Mennig founded his company in Avenue Van Volxem 310-312 in Brussels. His wood working machines were driven by a series of pulleys and belts and used for many operations from chopping to crafting.
