= J. Oor =

Piano factory in Brussels

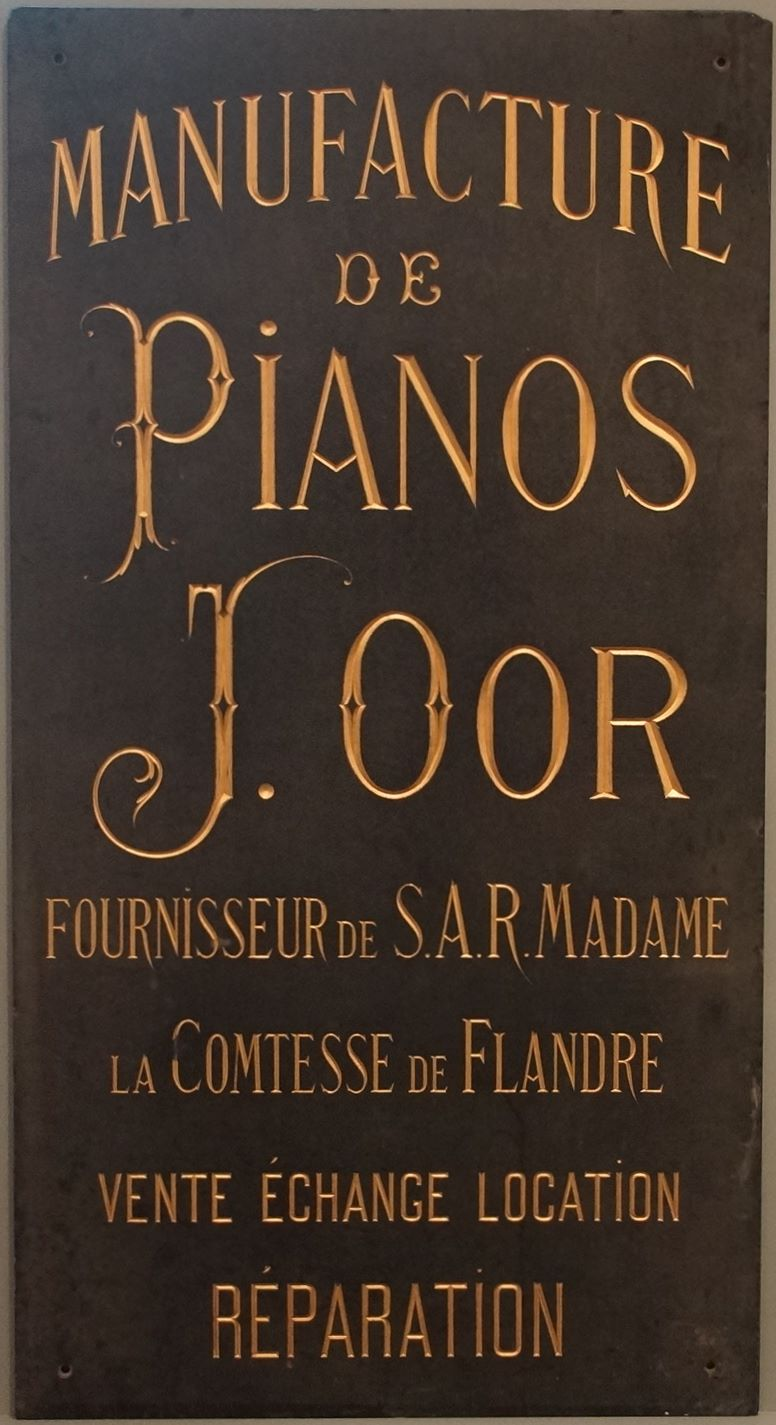
Original engraving exhibited at La Fonderie, Brussels Museum of Industry and Labour

J. Oor was a piano factory based in Brussels.

== History ==
Jean-Baptiste Oor (2 February 1846 in Brussels - 10 November 1940 in Brussels) was a Belgian piano maker, who set up a company in 30 Rue d'Arenberg in Brussels in 1871. This production lasted until 1935. He received praise and many prices at international exhibitions.

His son Lucien Oor (2 January 1877 in Brussels - 1949 in Brussels) founded his own factory in 1907 at a much higher quality level. He had undergone an apprenticeship training at Steinway & Sons in New York City. His manufacturing workshops were located at 23 Rue Glibert in Laeken and produced very good instruments. Foreign competition, coupled with an expensive management and the crisis of 1929, led to the closure of the company.

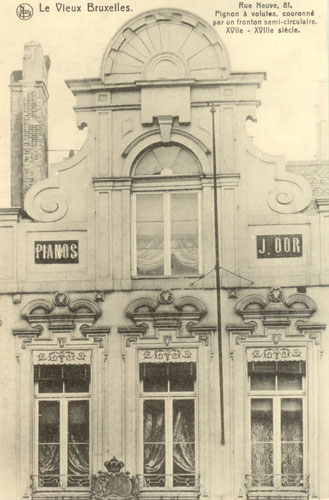
Façade of the sales building, rue Neuve, Brussels

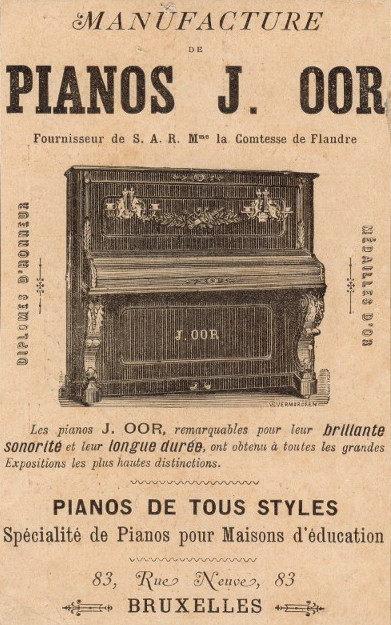
Advertisement, 1902

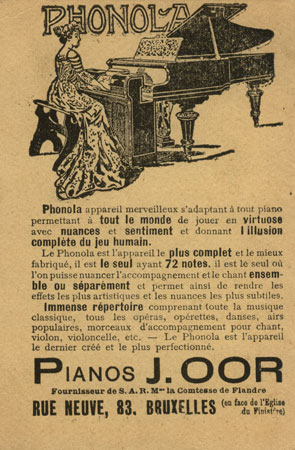
Publicity card, front, approx. 1910

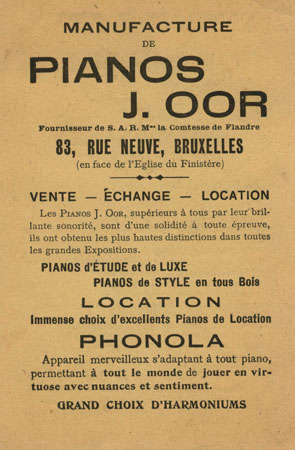
Publicity card, rear, approx. 1910
