= View of Brussels =

Painting by Jan Baptist Bonnecroy

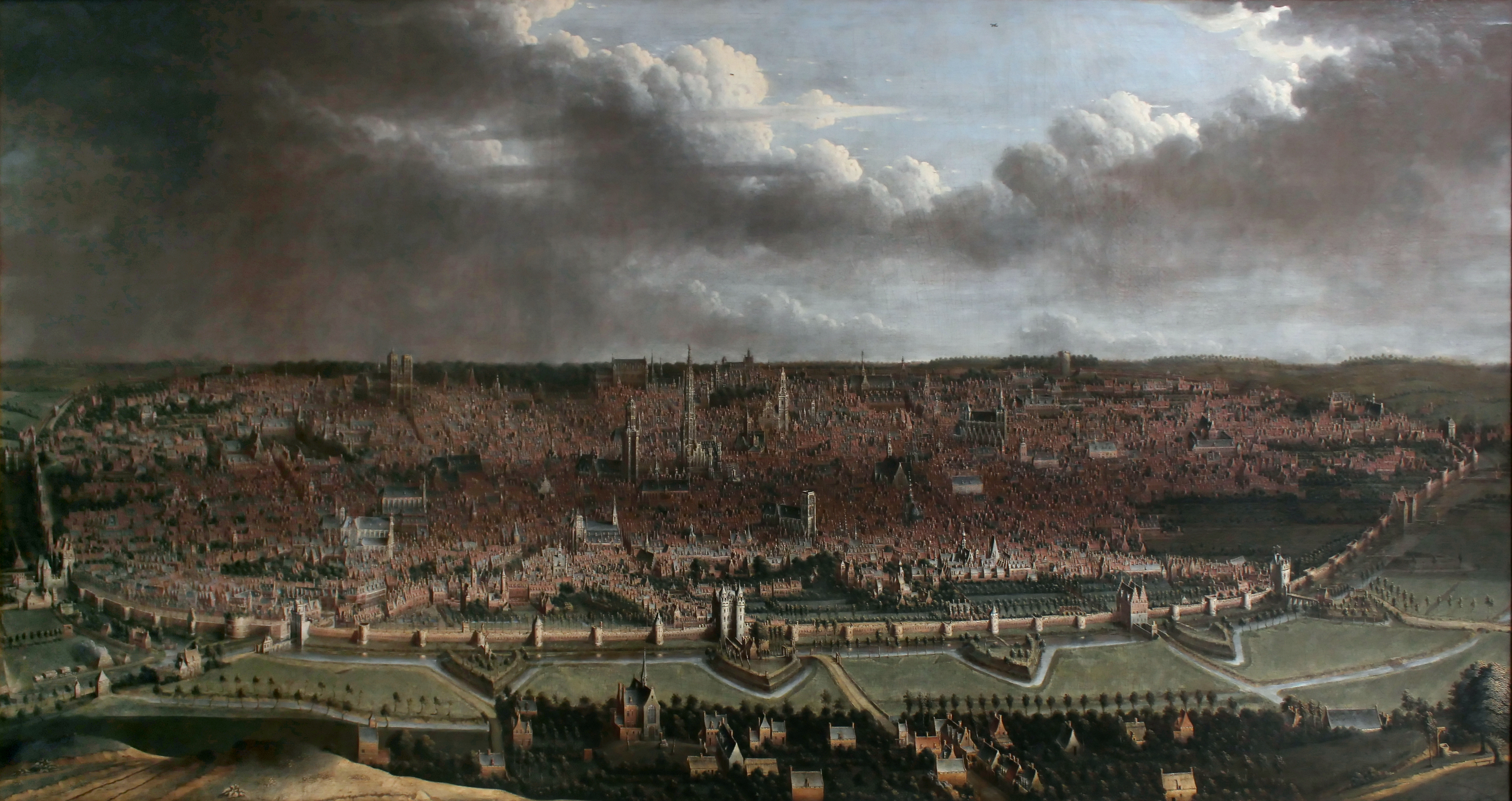
- Year: c. 1665
- Dimensions: 169 cm (67 in) × 301.5 cm (118.7 in)
- Location: Royal Museums of Fine Arts of Belgium
- Collection: King Baudouin Foundation
- Accession no.: KBS-FRB 0002

The View of Brussels is a painting by Jan Baptist Bonnecroy. It shows a panoramic view of the City of Brussels in the 17th century.

== Legacy ==
The work was painted by Jan Baptist Bonnecroy, a Flemish painter from Antwerp, circa 1664–65. It belonged to the Dukes of Arenberg.

Around 1960, the painting was sold by Engelbert-Charles d'Arenberg to a New York art dealer, who sent it to the United States.

In 1990, the King Baudouin Foundation's Heritage Fund was able to purchase the painting and return it to Belgium. The work has been entrusted, on long-term loan, to the Royal Museums of Fine Arts of Belgium in Brussels.

== Description ==
The painting shows a bird's eye view of the City of Brussels. It is painted looking down from an imaginary height in Molenbeek-Saint-Jean. in the north-west of the city. Bonnecroy would have been unable to see the city from this aerial perspective, proving that he worked in total liberty. He accentuated various buildings in the city, taking inspiration from local land surveys and printed maps.

A number of buildings in the painting can be identified, notably within the inner ring around the Pentagon of the old city. Amongst the buildings represented can be seen:

- The Coudenberg Palace
- The Cathedral of St. Michael and St. Gudula
- The Town Hall
- The choir of the Church of St. Nicholas
- The Temple of the Augustinians
- The Church of St. John the Baptist at the Béguinage
- The Church of St. Catherine
- The Pointless Gate (Porte à Peine Perdue)
- The Black Gate (Porte Noire)
- The Shore Gate (Porte du Rivage)
- The Church of St. John the Baptist in Molenbeek
- The Big Tower (Grosse Tour)
- The Church of Our Lady of Victories at the Sablon
- St. Peter's Hospital
- The Halle Gate
- The Jesuit Church
- The Church of Our Lady of the Chapel
- The Church of St. Gaugericus
- The Anderlecht Gate
- The Lesser Sluice Gate
- The Flanders Gate
