= Great Beguinage, Brussels =

Former beguinage in Brussels, Belgium

Great Beguinage of Brussels
- Grand Béguinage de Bruxelles (French); Groot Begijnhof van Brussel (Dutch)
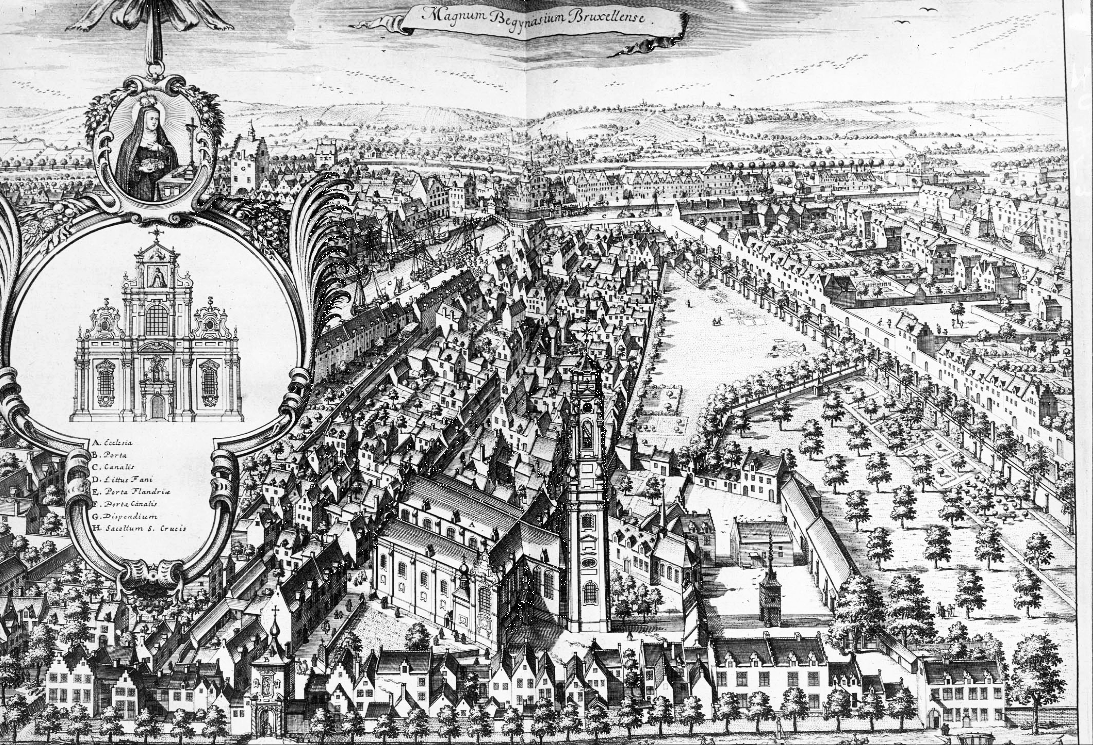
- Great Beguinage of Brussels, engraving by Jacobus Harrewijn, published in Chorographia Sacra Brabantiae (1727)
- Alternative names: Our Lady of the Vineyard Beguinage

General information
- Type: Beguinage
- Location: Brussels, Belgium
- Construction started: 13th century
- Closed: Deconsecrated in 1797

The Great Beguinage of Brussels (French: Grand Béguinage de Bruxelles; Dutch: Groot Begijnhof van Brussel), also known as the Our Lady of the Vineyard Beguinage (French: Béguinage de Notre-Dame de la Vigne; Dutch: Begijnhof Onze-Lieve-Vrouw ten Wijngaard), was a beguinage in the City of Brussels. It was suppressed during the French Revolution and abolished in 1797.

== History ==
Three court beguinages existed in Brussels during the Middle Ages; the first and largest of them was the Great Beguinage, also known as the Our Lady of the Vineyard Beguinage, which was founded before 1247 outside the city walls. Located near today's Place du Béguinage/Begijnhofplein, the community composed a miniature village of individual dwellings with a mill, laundry, and flower and vegetable garden enclosed within a wall. The beguines were lay women who lived a communal life but were not bound by perpetual vows. They built an infirmary and a small chapel dedicated to Our Lady of the Vineyard served as a place of worship.

Because their community had grown to 1,200 beguines by the end of the 13th century, a larger Gothic church was built where the present-day building is located. The women weaved wool, and from the 16th century onward, made lace. From the start, the Rue du Béguinage/Begijnhofstraat ("Beguines Street") formed the main axis of this large triangular domain of which the Rue de Laeken/Lakensestraat ("Laeken Street") formed the base. The area between the Rue de Laeken and the Quai au Bois à Brûler/Brandhoutkaai was known as the Beguinage Quarter (French: Quartier du Béguinage, Dutch: Begijnhofwijk) at that time.

The Great Beguinage was looted in 1579 by Scottish auxiliary troops as part of the larger Beeldenstorm. The beguines were dispersed in 1797 during the French regime. The grounds were parcelled out gradually and streets laid out. The infirmary was renovated and transformed into the Grand Hospice Pachéco. The last houses of the beguinage disappeared in 1856.

== See also ==
- Catholic Church in Belgium
- History of Brussels
- Culture of Belgium
