= Church of St. John the Baptist, Molenbeek =

Church in Molenbeek, Belgium

Church of St. John the Baptist
- Église Saint-Jean-Baptiste (French); Sint-Jan-de-Doperkerk (Dutch)
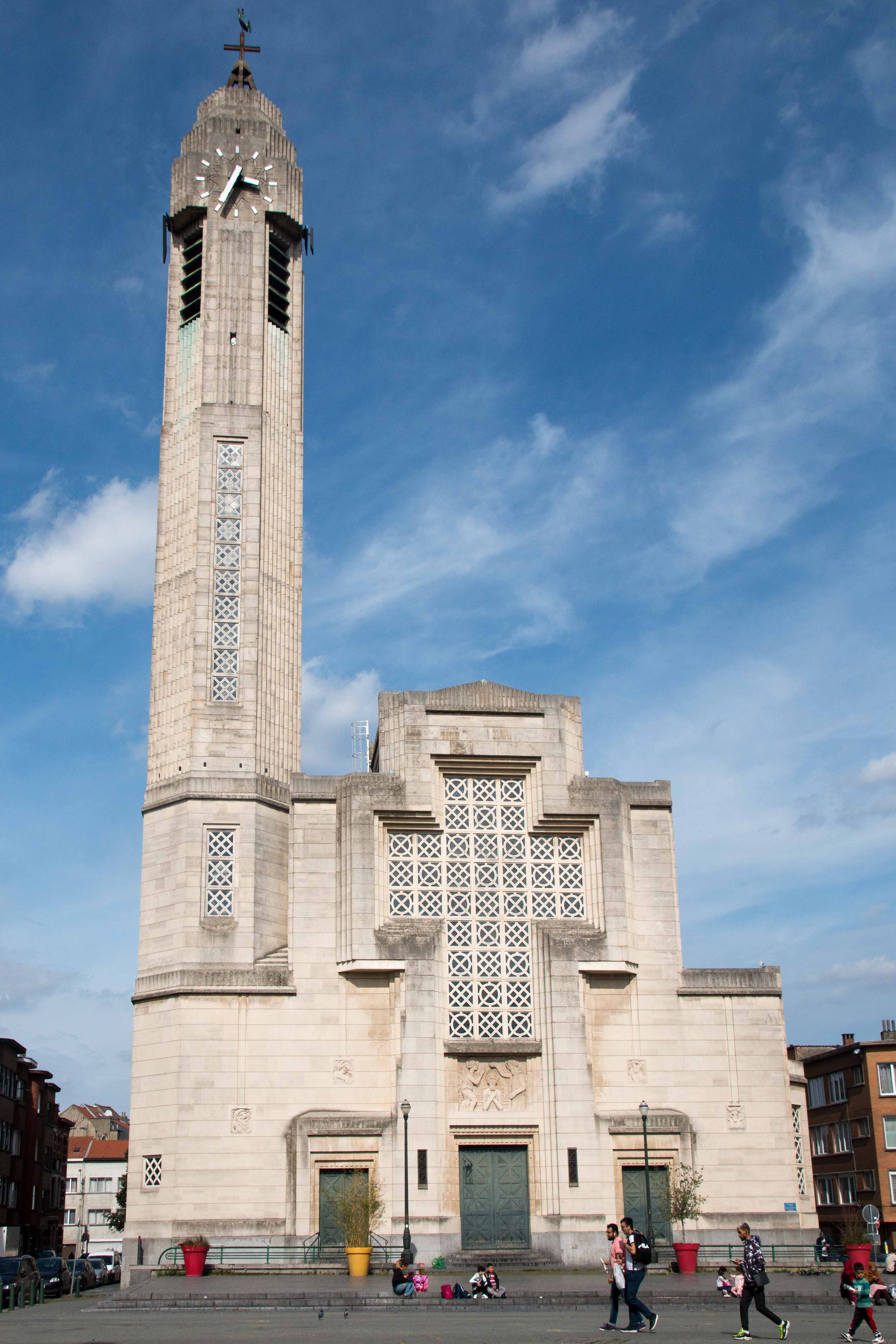
- Church of St. John the Baptist in Molenbeek
- Church of St. John the Baptist
- 50°51′26″N 4°20′26″E
- Location: Parvis Saint Jean-Baptiste / Sint-Jan-Baptistvoorplein; 1080 Molenbeek-Saint-Jean, Brussels-Capital Region
- Country: Belgium
- Denomination: Catholic Church

History
- Status: Parish church
- Dedication: Saint John the Baptist (patron saint of Molenbeek)

Architecture
- Functional status: Active
- Heritage designation: Protected
- Designated: 29/02/1984
- Architect: Joseph Diongre
- Architectural type: Church
- Style: Art Deco
- Groundbreaking: 1930
- Completed: 1932

Specifications
- Materials: Reinforced concrete

Administration
- Archdiocese: Mechelen–Brussels

Clergy
- Archbishop: Luc Terlinden (Primate of Belgium)

The Church of St. John the Baptist (French: Église Saint-Jean-Baptiste; Dutch: Sint-Jan-de-Doperkerk) is a Catholic parish church in the centre of Molenbeek-Saint-Jean, a municipality of Brussels, Belgium. It is dedicated to Saint John the Baptist, the patron saint of Molenbeek.

Designed by the architect Joseph Diongre and built between 1930 and 1932 in Art Deco style, it is one of three major churches in Brussels made of reinforced concrete (the other two are the Basilica of the Sacred Heart in Koekelberg and the Church of St. Augustine in Forest). Belonging to the Metropolitan Archdiocese of Mechelen–Brussels, the church and the Catholic parish it belongs to gave their name to the municipality. The building received protected status on 29 February 1984.

The church is located on the northern side of the Parvis Saint Jean-Baptiste/Sint-Jan-Baptistvoorplein, not far from the Place Communale/Gemeenteplein (the municipal square of Molenbeek).

== History ==
=== Medieval church ===
As early as the 9th century, Molenbeek was the site of a church dedicated to Saint John the Baptist, following a bequest from Saint Gertrude of Nivelles, the mythical founder of Nivelles Abbey, whose statue adorns the current building's transept. There were successive buildings whose chronology and locations are not clearly determined. The parish itself, whose boundaries were much greater than today, reaching as far as the river Senne, seems to predate the 9th century, and from the end of the 12th century, also included a chapel dedicated to Saint Catherine, which, separated from the village by Brussels' city walls, gradually became the current Church of St. Catherine in the Quays or Sainte-Catherine/Sint-Katelijne Quarter of Brussels.

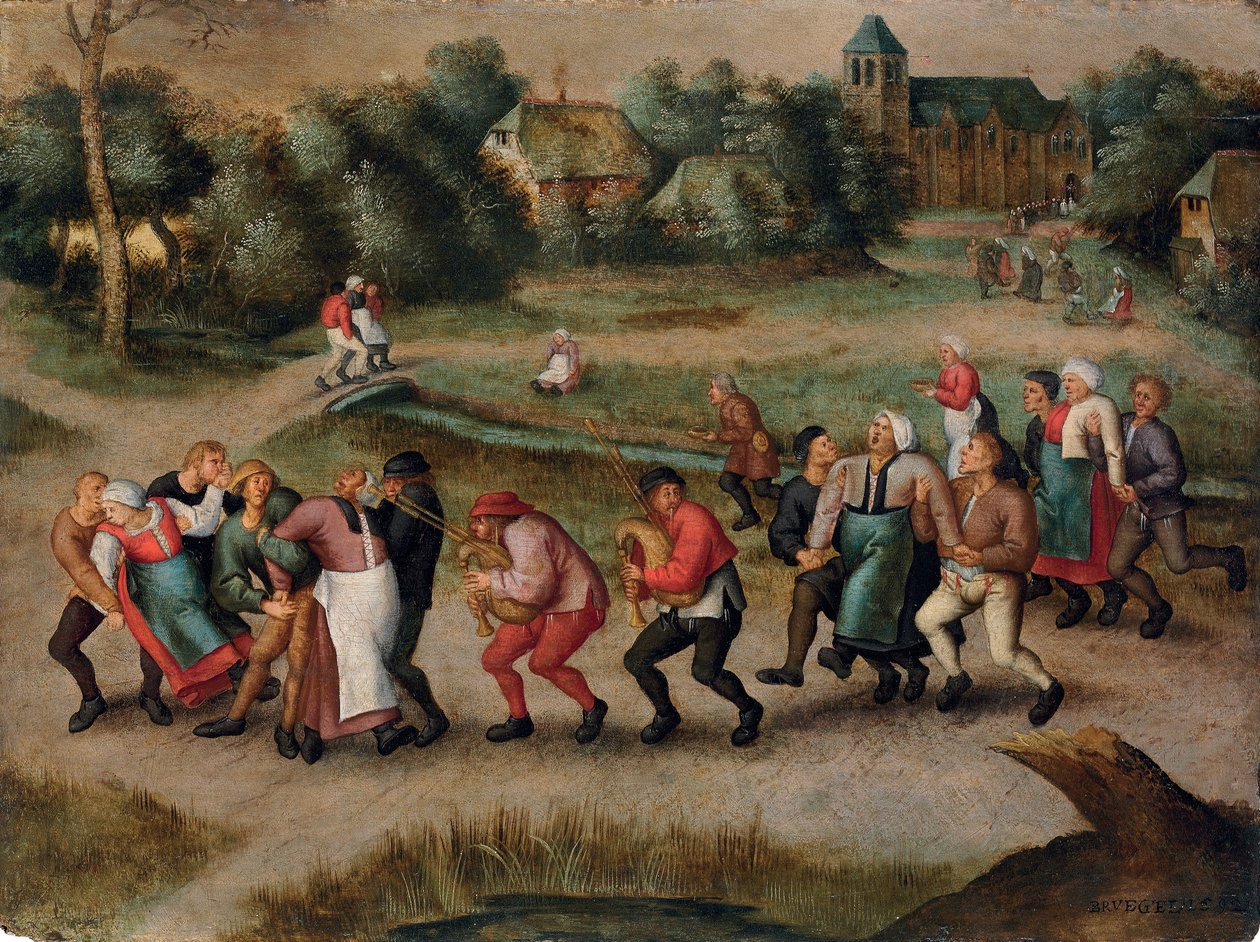
Saint John's Dancers in Molenbeeck', Pieter Brueghel the Younger, 1592

The parish of Molenbeek depended on the chapter of the Collegiate Church of St. Michael and St. Gudula (now Brussels' cathedral). This is confirmed in a papal bull by Pope Alexander III from 9 April 1174 listing the property of the chapter, which included St. John's Church, as well as other property. This did not prevent the parish priest of Molenbeek from several times being in conflict with the canon of St. Gudula, among other things, about the establishment of a female convent near the St. Catherine Gate in 1238, or about the Great Beguinage of Brussels (of which the Church of St. John the Baptist at the Béguinage remains today) in 1250, or again about the opening of a school in 1451.

Later, the tradition of a special pilgrimage for patients with epilepsy developed around St. John's Church. On St. John's Day (24 June), a dancing procession took place, in which epileptics could be freed from their illness for a year if they crossed a bridge over the Molenbeek brook towards the church without their feet touching the ground. A painting by Pieter Brueghel the Younger, dating from 1592, illustrates this procession.

The medieval church was dismantled in 1578 during the Calvinist Republic of Brussels, which lasted from 1577 to 1585. Religious unrest prompted the parish priest of Molenbeek to make St. Catherine's Chapel his main church, though St. John's Church was later rebuilt on its original spot.

=== 19th-century church ===
In 1834–1836, a new Church of St. John the Baptist was built according to the plans of the Brussels architect Louis Spaak. However, the new building soon became cramped, not having been designed for a parish whose expansion was rapid during the second half of the 19th century. In addition, it was plagued by moisture problems, so by the early 20th century, it was already due for replacement, but the church's Parish Council did not have the resources for such an operation. In fact Molenbeek was not unique, as many new parishes were created in the suburbs of Brussels around that time.

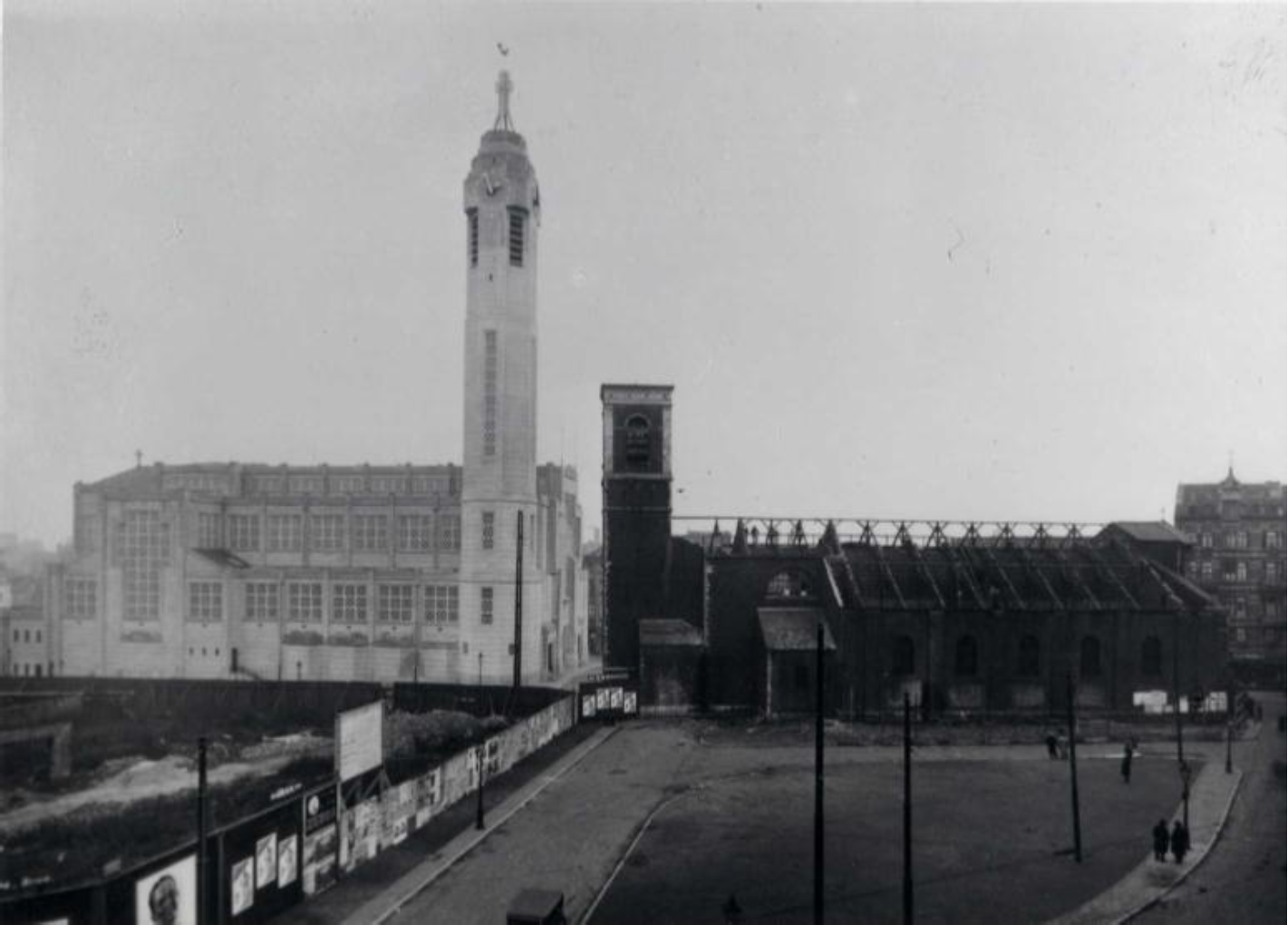
The new and old Church of St. John the Baptist (under demolition) in 1932

By the 1920s, the then-mayor of Molenbeek, Louis Mettewie, although an anti-clerical liberal, made the municipal council financially intervene, believing that his municipality was worthy of a new church to live up to its reputation as the Little Manchester (French: le petit Manchester, Dutch: het Klein Manchester) or the Belgian Manchester (French: le Manchester belge, Dutch: het Belgisch Manchester), in reference to the Northern English city that led the history of industrialisation.

=== Art Deco church (1930–1932) ===
The project for the new church was entrusted to the architect Joseph Diongre. The Art Deco building, one of the first churches in Brussels made of reinforced concrete, was built next to the old one, which was demolished once the project was completed, leaving a space where the Parvis Saint Jean-Baptiste/Sint-Jan-Baptistvoorplein was laid out.

The choice of reinforced concrete, rather than brick or stone, was motivated by financial reasons. At the end of the 1920s, the economic crisis made itself felt. The building is large in size but the construction costs were maintained at 5 million Belgian francs (for an initial estimate of 9 million). Even the window frames or claustra (604 of them) are made of precast concrete. These modern techniques allowed the construction of the building in record time of fifteen months. The plans were signed on 20 August 1930, the first stone was laid by Cardinal Jozef-Ernest van Roey on 11 May 1931, and the church was inaugurated in 1932.

== Description ==
=== Exterior ===
The current building is resolutely Art Deco. It can accommodate thousands of parishioners. Outside, the concrete structure is partly covered with Brauvilliers stone. Above the central portal is a bas-relief by the sculptor Albert Aebly illustrating the baptism of Christ by Saint John the Baptist. The façade window is in the shape of an enormous Latin cross of glass. The steeple, octagonal, tall, slender, and topped with a modernist clock, flanks the left side of the façade. It is accessible to the public via a staircase of 292 steps leading to a 68-metre-high (223 ft) platform, which offers a panoramic view of Brussels.

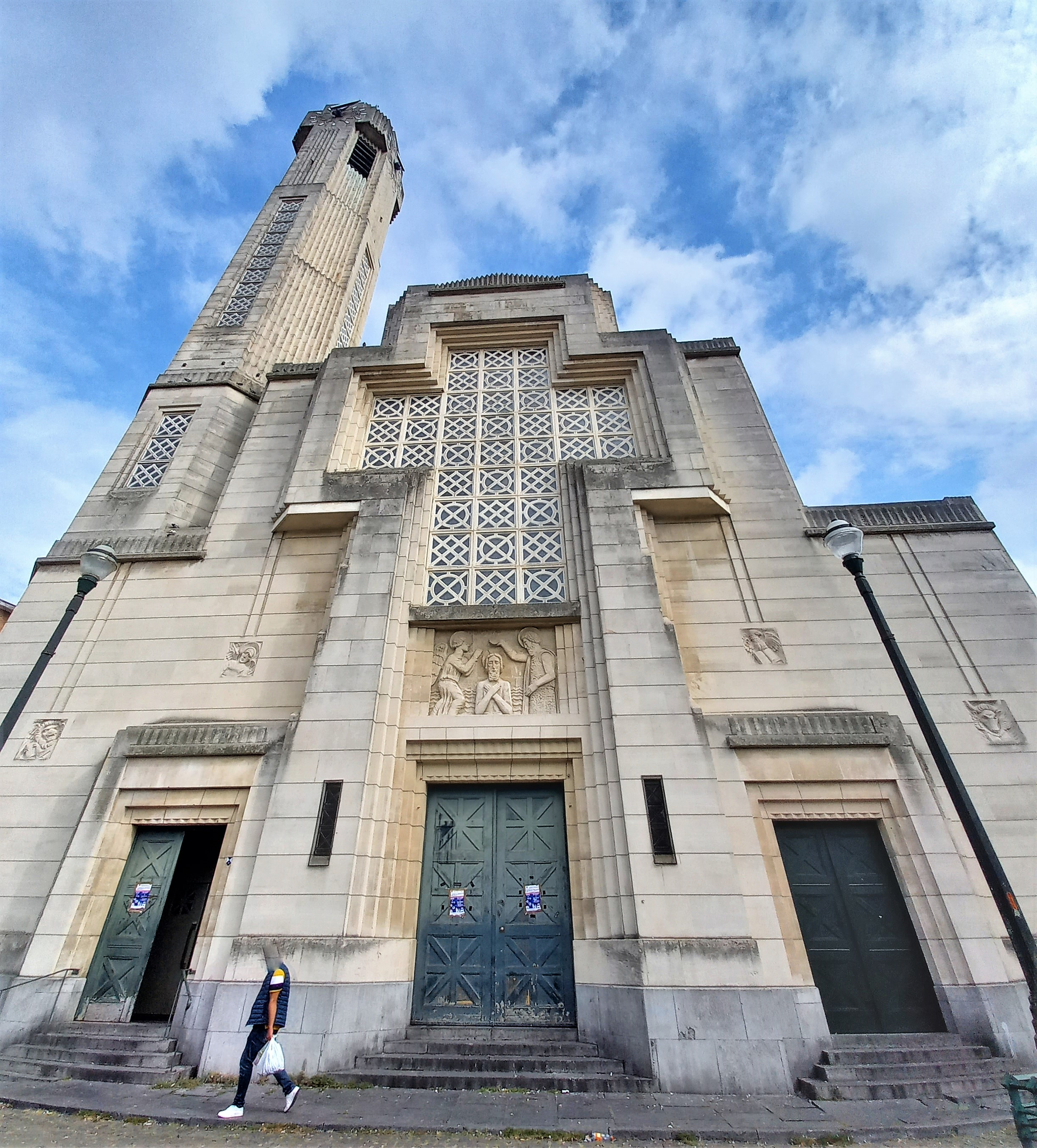
Main façade

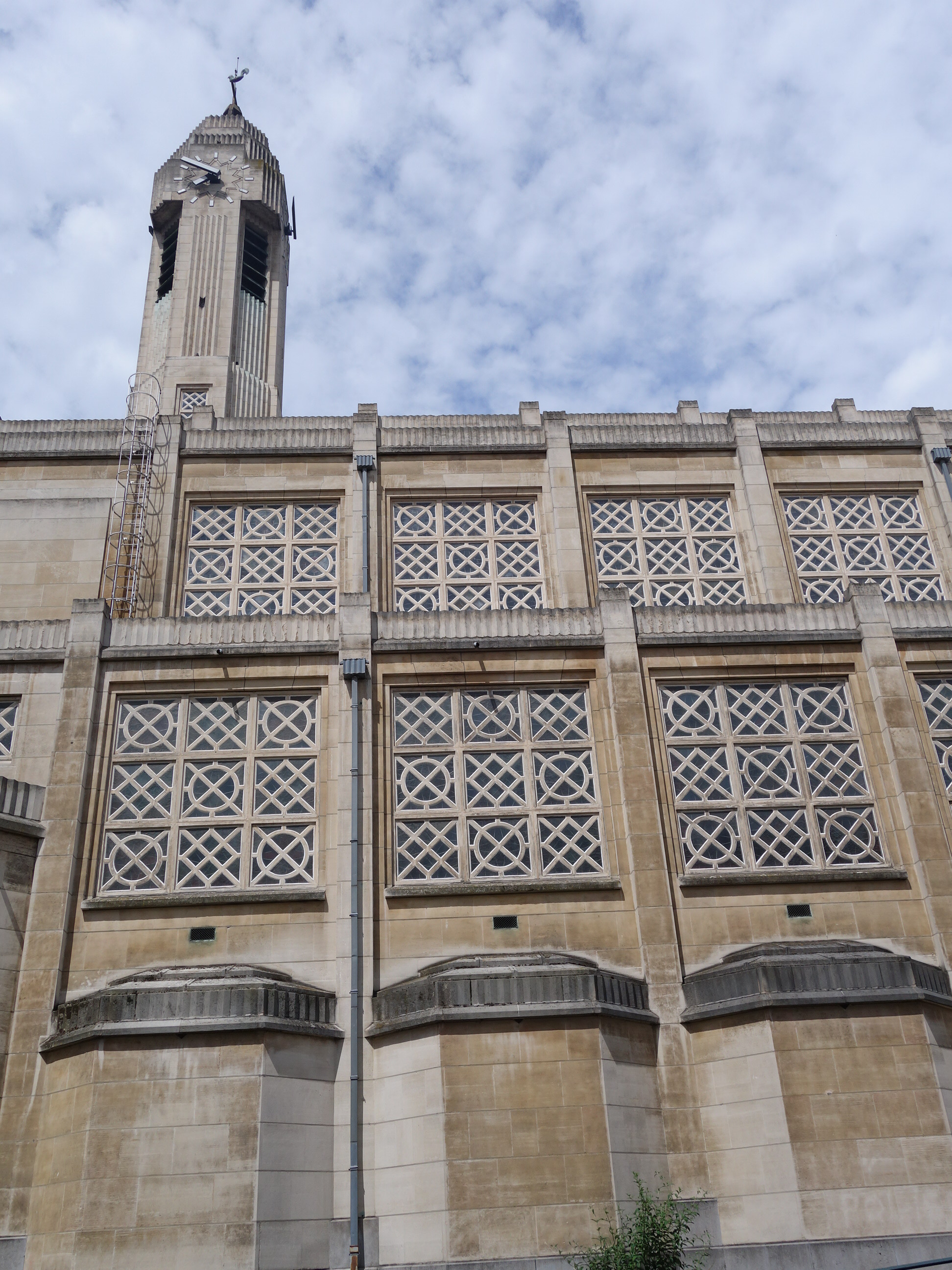
Side wall claustra

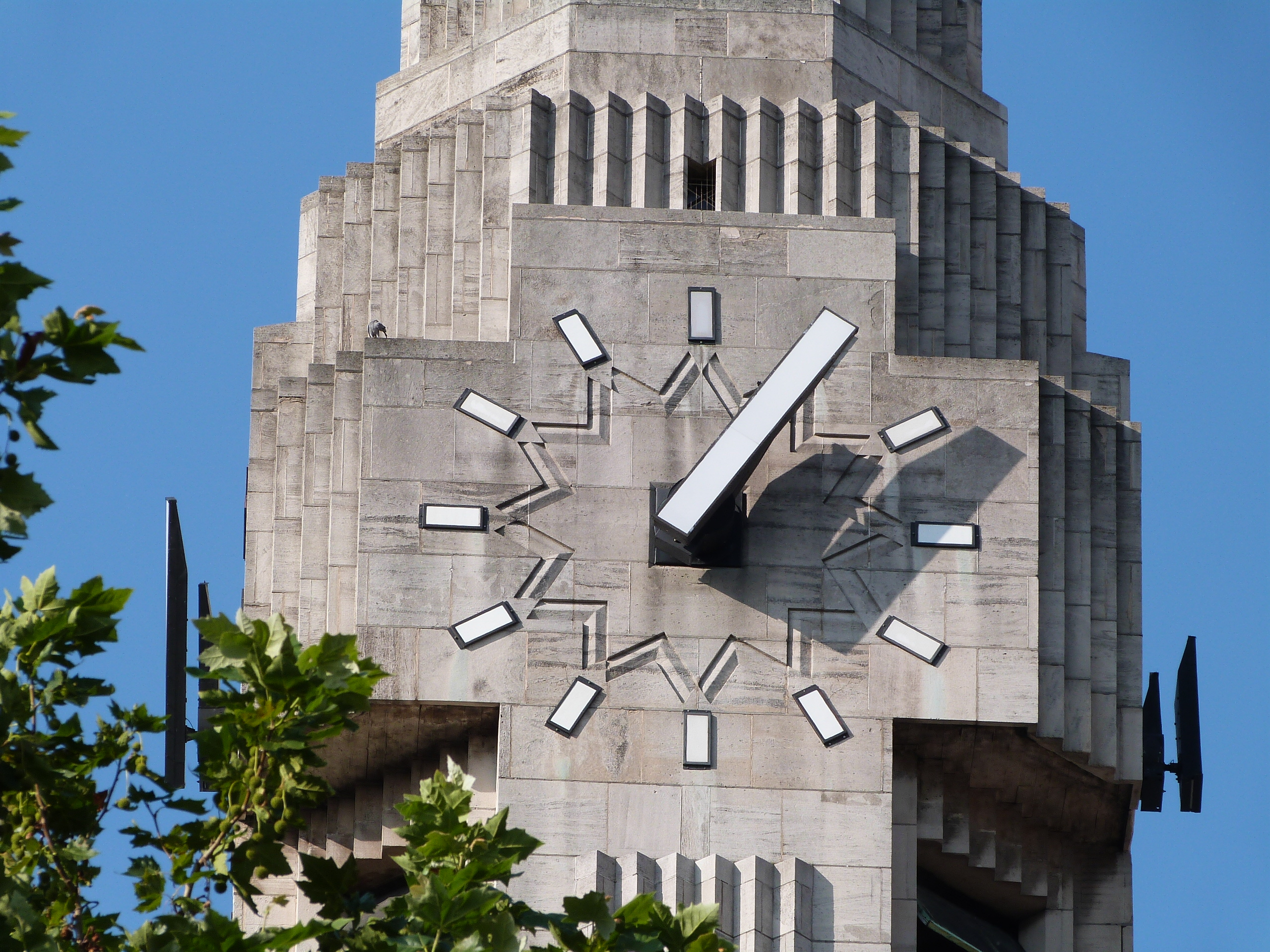
Clock tower

=== Interior ===
The interior is bright and colourful. Space and volume are determined by columns that form slender parabolic arches towards the centre, creating a high-dimensional nave, and other rather symbolic ones towards the two aisles, whose space is barely separated from that of the nave. The six arches of the nave are 23 metres (75 ft) high. The stained glass windows and the concrete-glass compositions are reminiscent of the Church of Notre-Dame du Raincy, near Paris. The non-figurative stained glass windows come from the Brussels studio of the glassmaker and decorator Frans David Crickx.

Some interior elements were recovered from the old church, such as the choir stalls, which date from the 17th century, and an 18th-century statue of Saint John the Baptist attributed to Pieter-Jozef Verhaghen.

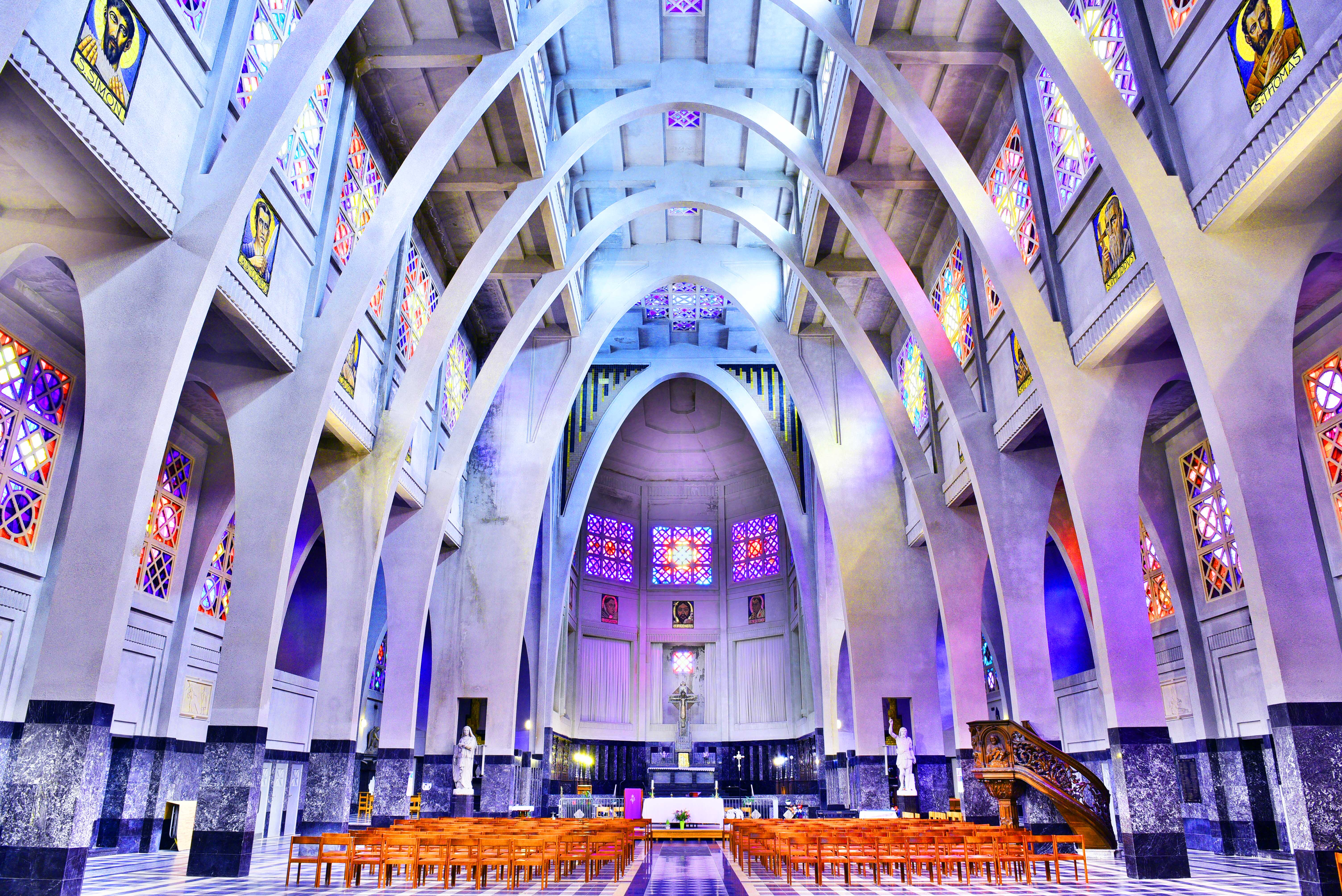
Interior

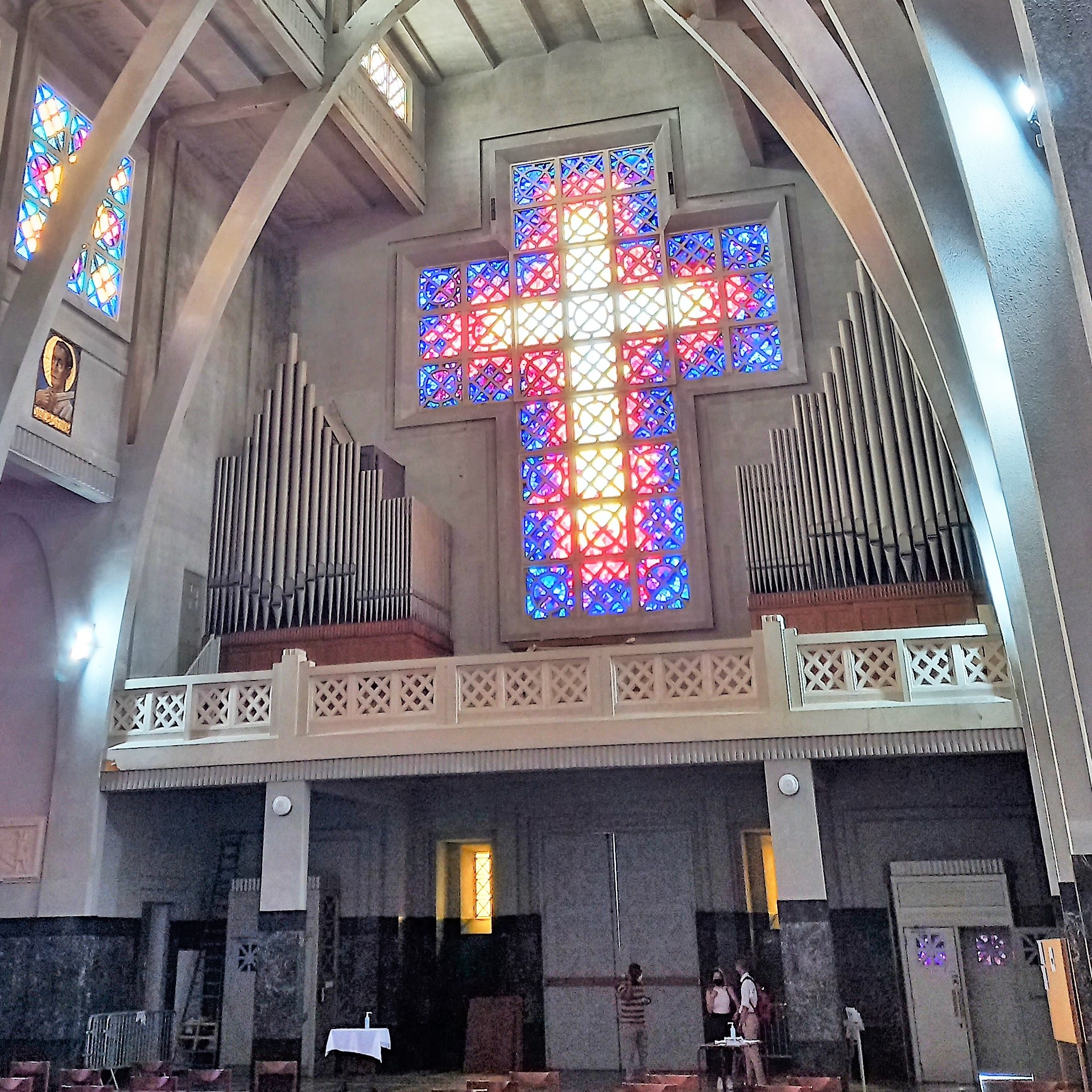
Main window and organ

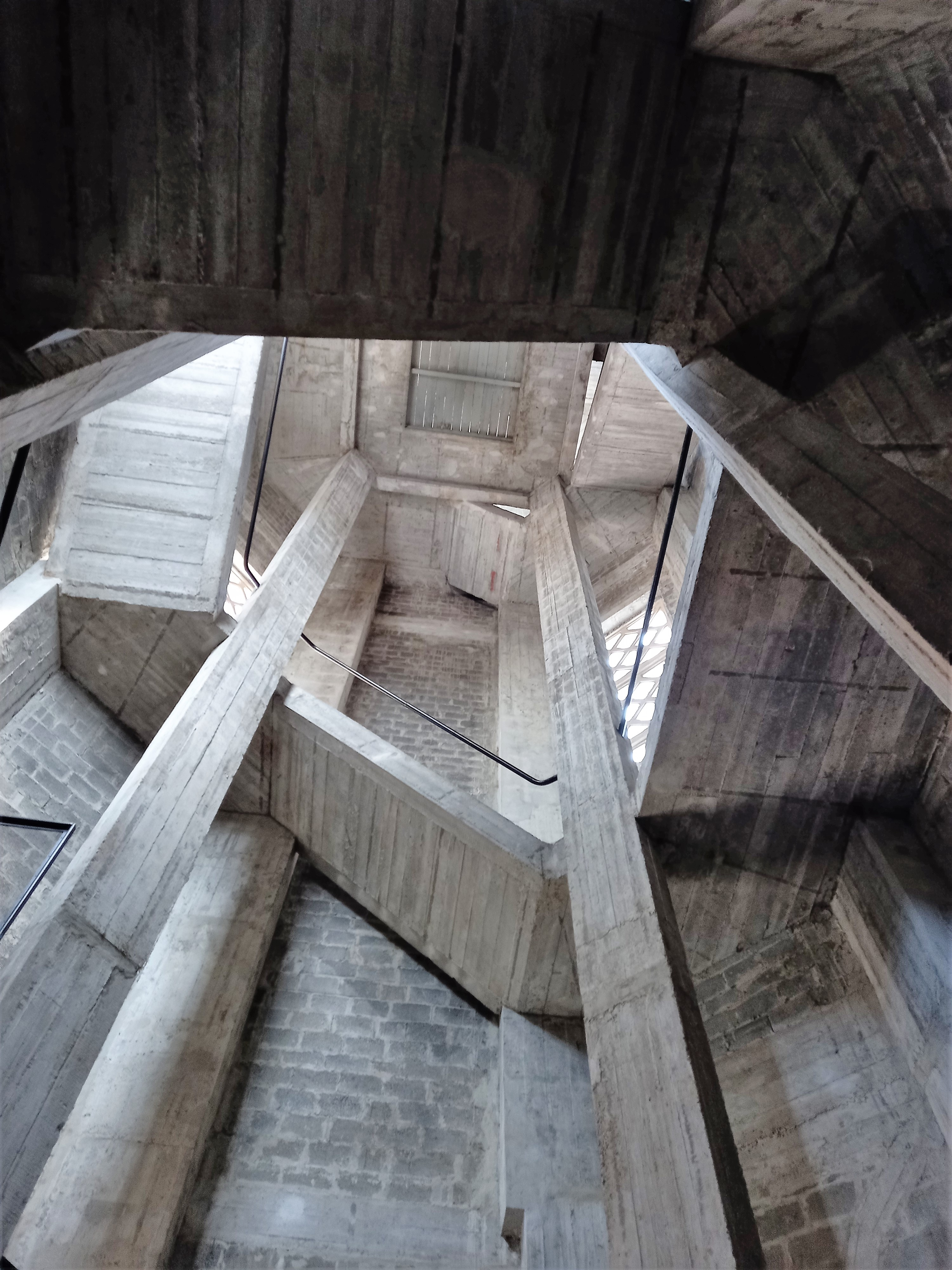
Inside the bell tower

== See also ==
- List of churches in Brussels
- Catholic Church in Belgium
- Art Deco in Brussels
- History of Brussels
- Culture of Belgium
- Belgium in the long nineteenth century
