= Church of St. John the Baptist at the Béguinage =

Church in Brussels, Belgium

- Église Saint-Jean-Baptiste au Béguinage (French); Sint-Jan-Baptist ten Begijnhofkerk (Dutch)
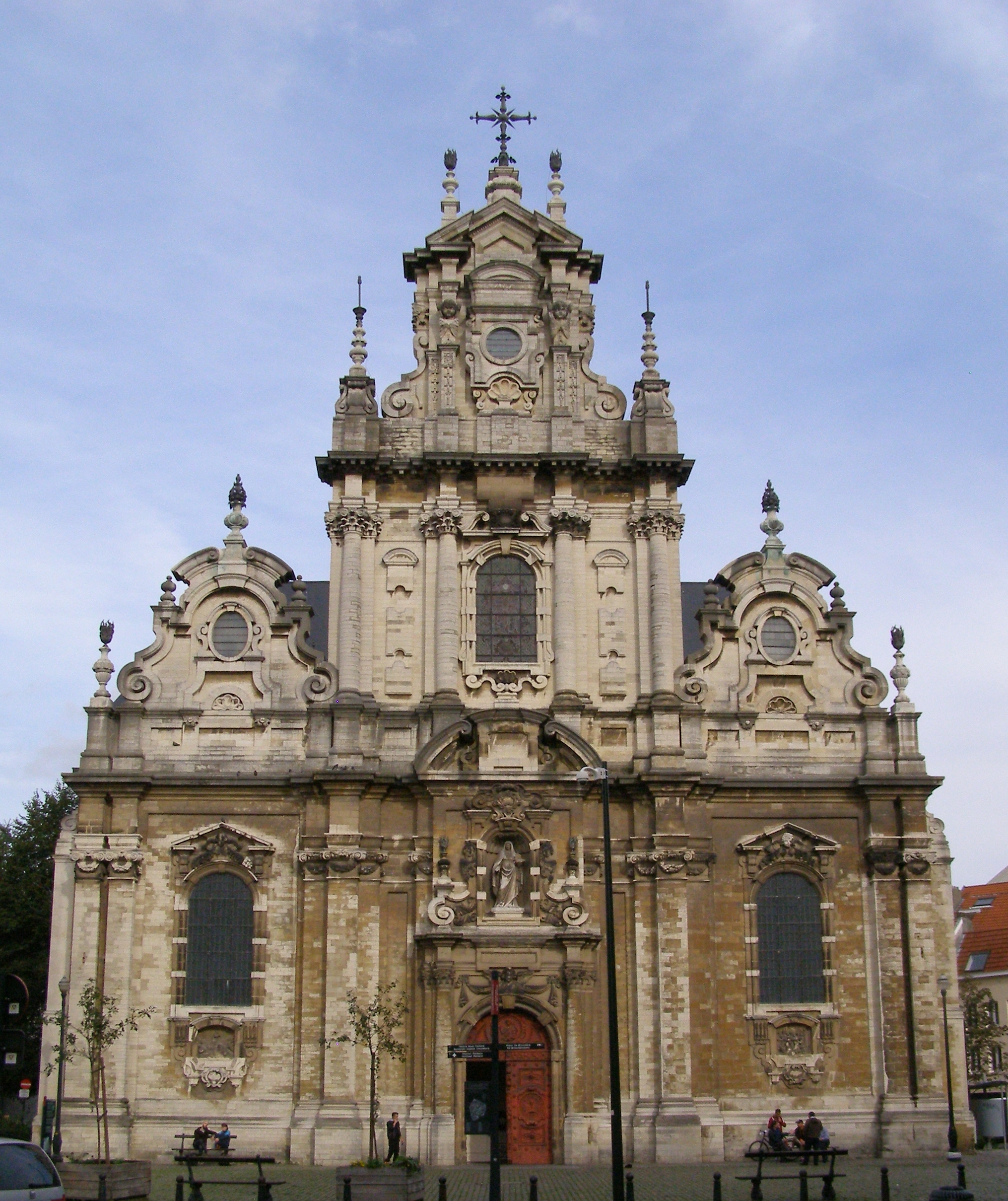
- St. John the Baptist at the Béguinage
- Church of St. John the Baptist at the Béguinage
- 50°51′9.73″N 4°21′1.68″E
- Location: Place du Béguinage / Begijnhofplein; 1000 City of Brussels, Brussels-Capital Region
- Country: Belgium
- Denomination: Catholic Church

History
- Status: Parish church
- Dedication: Saint John the Baptist
- Consecrated: 1676

Architecture
- Functional status: Active
- Heritage designation: Protected
- Designated: 05/03/1936
- Architect: Lucas Faydherbe
- Architectural type: Church
- Style: Brabantine Baroque
- Groundbreaking: 1657

Specifications
- Length: 20 metres (66 ft)
- Width: 62 metres (203 ft)

Administration
- Archdiocese: Mechelen–Brussels

Clergy
- Archbishop: Luc Terlinden (Primate of Belgium)

The Church of St. John the Baptist at the Béguinage (French: Église Saint-Jean-Baptiste au Béguinage; Dutch: Sint-Jan-Baptist ten Begijnhofkerk), or the Béguinage Church (French: Église du Béguinage; Dutch: Begijnhofkerk), is a Catholic parish church in central Brussels, Belgium. It is dedicated to Saint John the Baptist.

The original Gothic church was built at the end of 13th century, as part of the Great Beguinage of Brussels. It was partially destroyed by Calvinists in 1584 and rebuilt thereafter. Attributed to the Flemish architect Lucas Faydherbe, the reconstructed building, which still stands today, is a notable illustration of the Italian-influenced Brabantine Baroque style of the 17th century. The complex was designated a historic monument in 1936.

The church is located on the Place du Béguinage/Begijnhofplein, not far from the Place de Brouckère/De Brouckèreplein, the Place Sainte-Catherine/Sint-Katelijneplein and the Grand Hospice Pachéco.

== History ==
=== Early history ===
Three court beguinages existed in Brussels during the Middle Ages; the first and largest of them was the Great Beguinage, also known as the Our Lady of the Vineyard Beguinage, which was founded before 1247 outside the city walls. Located near today's Place du Béguinage/Begijnhofplein, the community composed a miniature village of individual dwellings with a mill, laundry, and flower and vegetable garden enclosed within a wall. The beguines were lay women who lived a communal life but were not bound by perpetual vows. They built an infirmary and a small chapel dedicated to Our Lady of the Vineyard served as a place of worship.

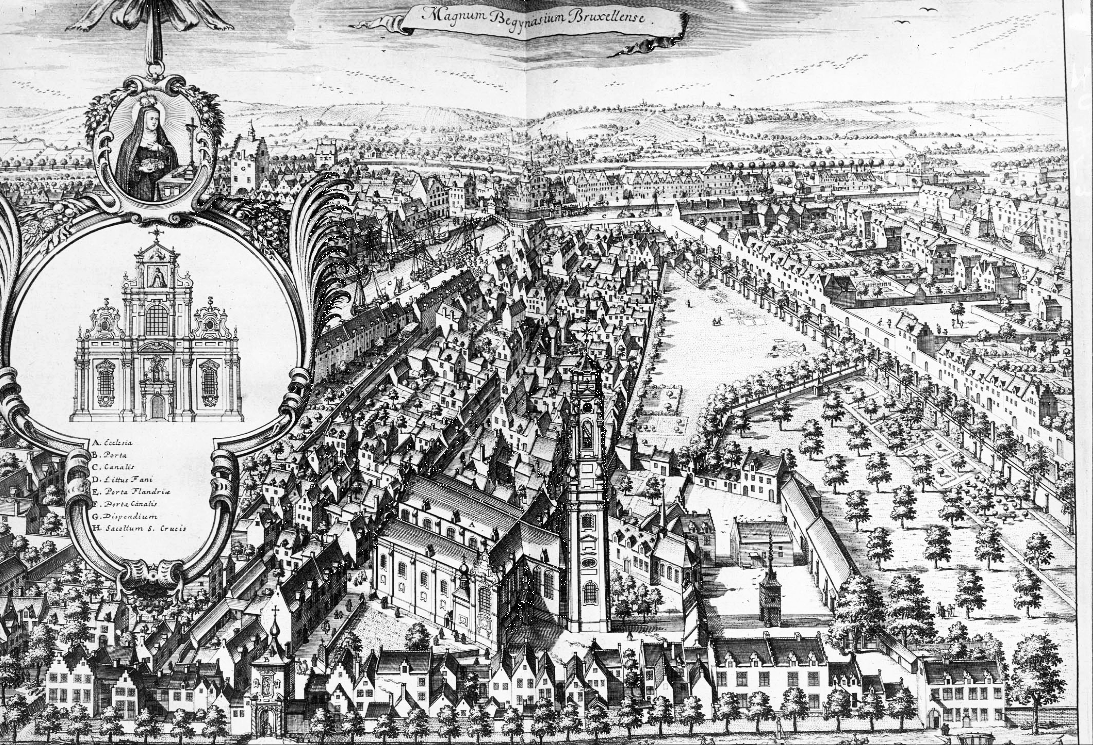
Great Beguinage of Brussels, engraving by Jacobus Harrewijn, published in Chorographia Sacra Brabantiae (1727)

Because their community had grown to 1,200 beguines by the end of the 13th century, a larger Gothic church with three naves and a transept was built where the present-day building is located. The women weaved wool, and from the 16th century onward, made lace. From the start, the Rue du Béguinage/Begijnhofstraat ("Beguines Street") formed the main axis of this large triangular domain of which the Rue de Laeken/Lakensestraat ("Laeken Street") formed the base. The area between the Rue de Laeken and the Quai au Bois à Brûler/Brandhoutkaai was known as the Beguinage Quarter (French: Quartier du Béguinage, Dutch: Begijnhofwijk) at that time.

=== Current church ===
The Gothic church was destroyed by Calvinists in 1584 during the Calvinist Republic of Brussels, which lasted from 1577 to 1585. The beguines decided to rebuild their church in Baroque style, reusing the foundations of the earlier sanctuary. Construction began in 1657, and continued until the end of the 17th century, following an interruption in 1667. The building was consecrated in 1676. Two additional portals were installed in 1770.

The beguines were dispersed in 1797 during the French regime. The grounds were parcelled out gradually and streets laid out. The infirmary was renovated and transformed into the Grand Hospice Pachéco. The last houses of the beguinage disappeared in 1856.

The church has undergone several restoration campaigns. Its exterior was extensively restored between 1845 and 1881, with the architect I. De Curte taking the lead from 1866 onwards. An interior restoration followed around 1904 under the direction of A. Capronnier. The church was designated a historic monument on 5 March 1936. Further exterior restoration work took place between 1962 and 1980 under V. G. Martiny. In 1998, the expulsion of the Nigerian asylum seeker Semira Adamu, who died from police violence, triggered the occupation of the church from October 1998 to January 1999 by political refugee candidates awaiting regularisation. The church was restored once again after a fire ravaged the roof in November 2000.

== Description ==
Attributed to the Flemish architect Lucas Faydherbe, the church is a notable illustration of the Italian-influenced Brabantine Baroque style of the 17th century. This is particularly evident in the onion-shaped pinnacles and the ornate walls. The reuse of the earlier church's foundations accounts in part for its traditional Latin cross plan, which is unusual for a church of that style.

=== Exterior ===
The main (western) façade, considered one of the most beautiful in Belgium, is organised into three diminishing levels, separated by prominent horizontal entablatures and crowned by a triangular pediment. Its architectural composition combines columns, pilasters, niches, arched openings and sculptural ornament. The façade's elaborate Baroque decoration contrasts with the relatively restrained treatment of the building's architectural structure. The church is surmounted by a polygonal tower at its eastern end, adjoining the choir.

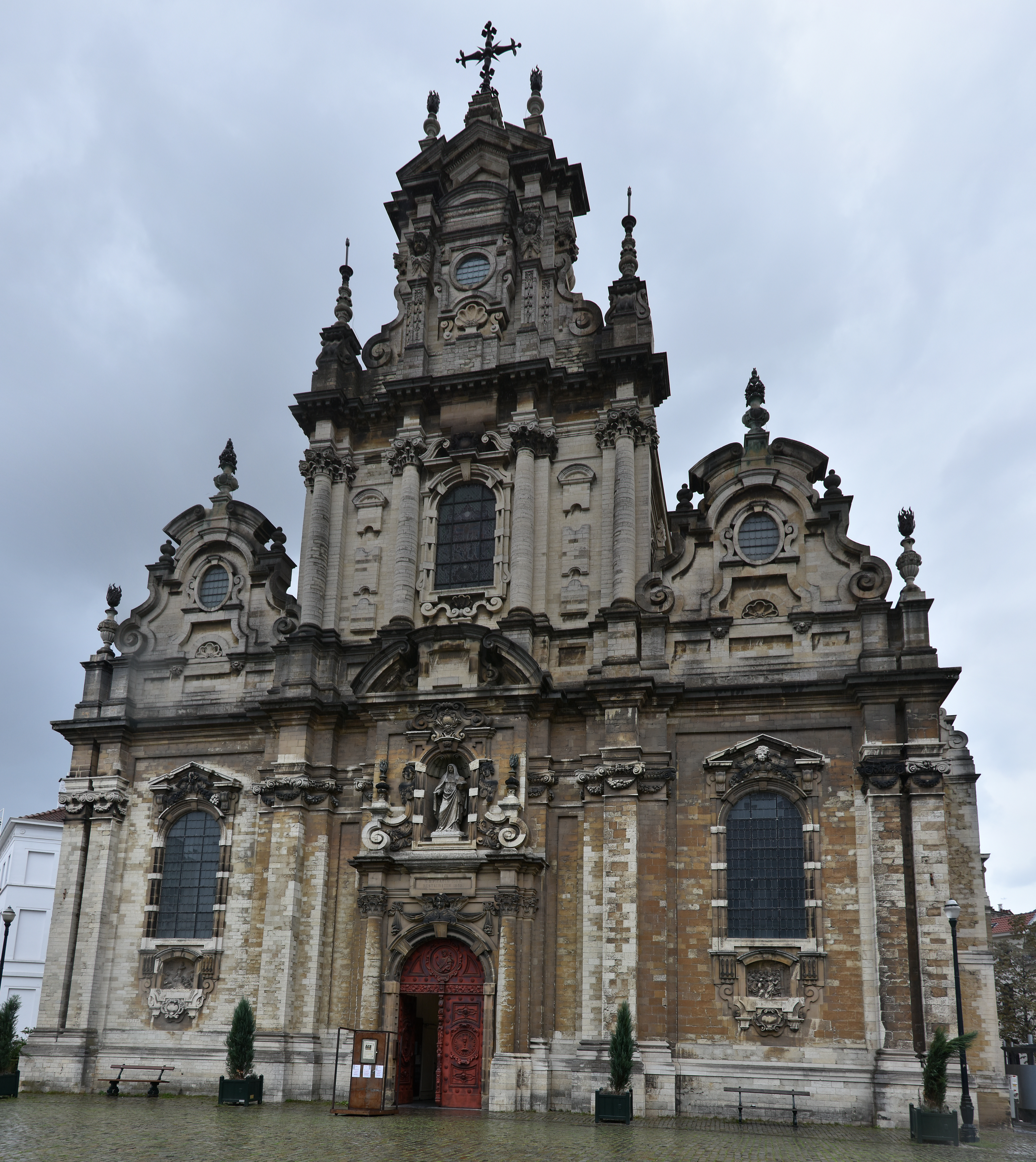
The western façade

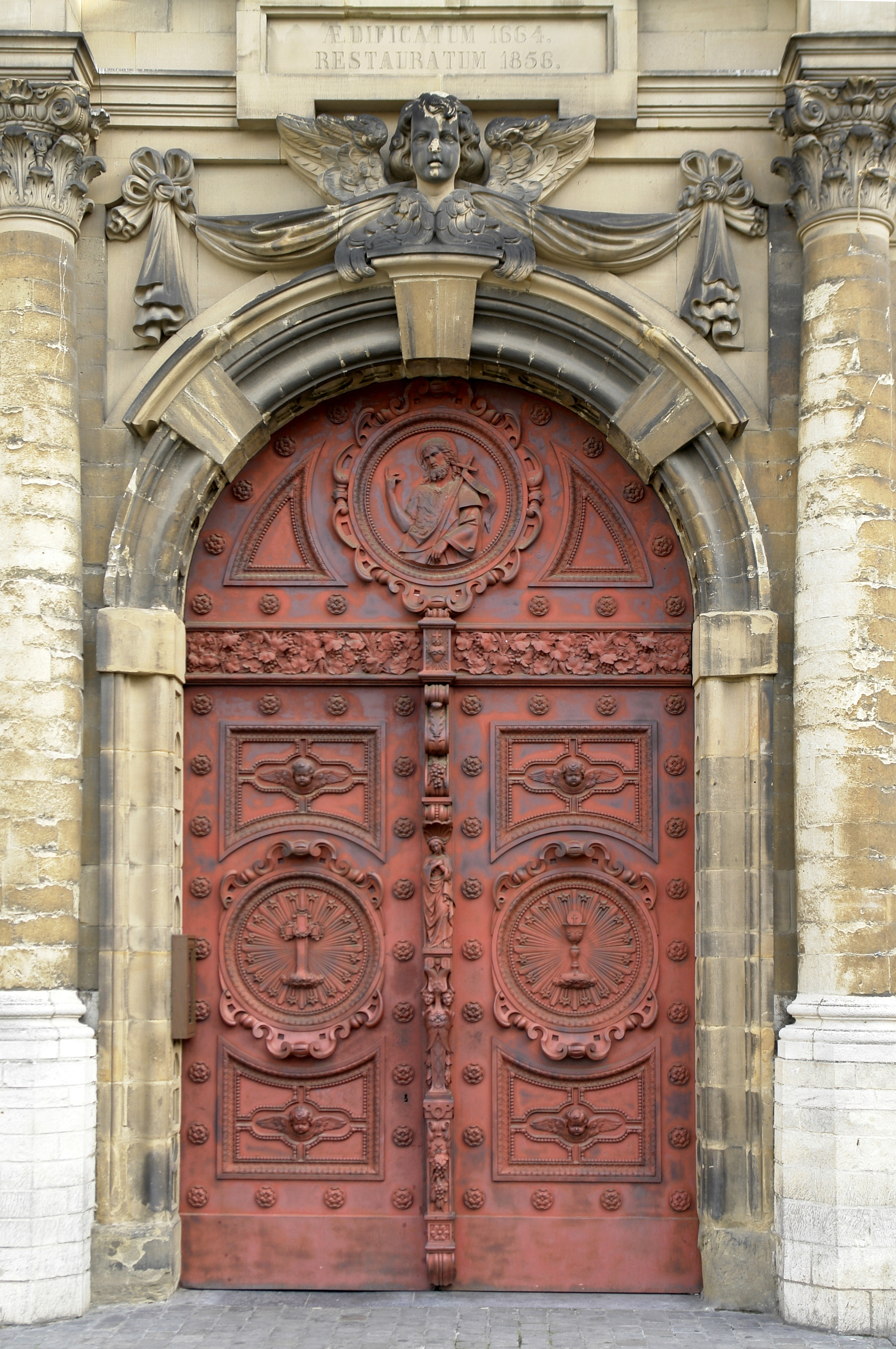
The main portal

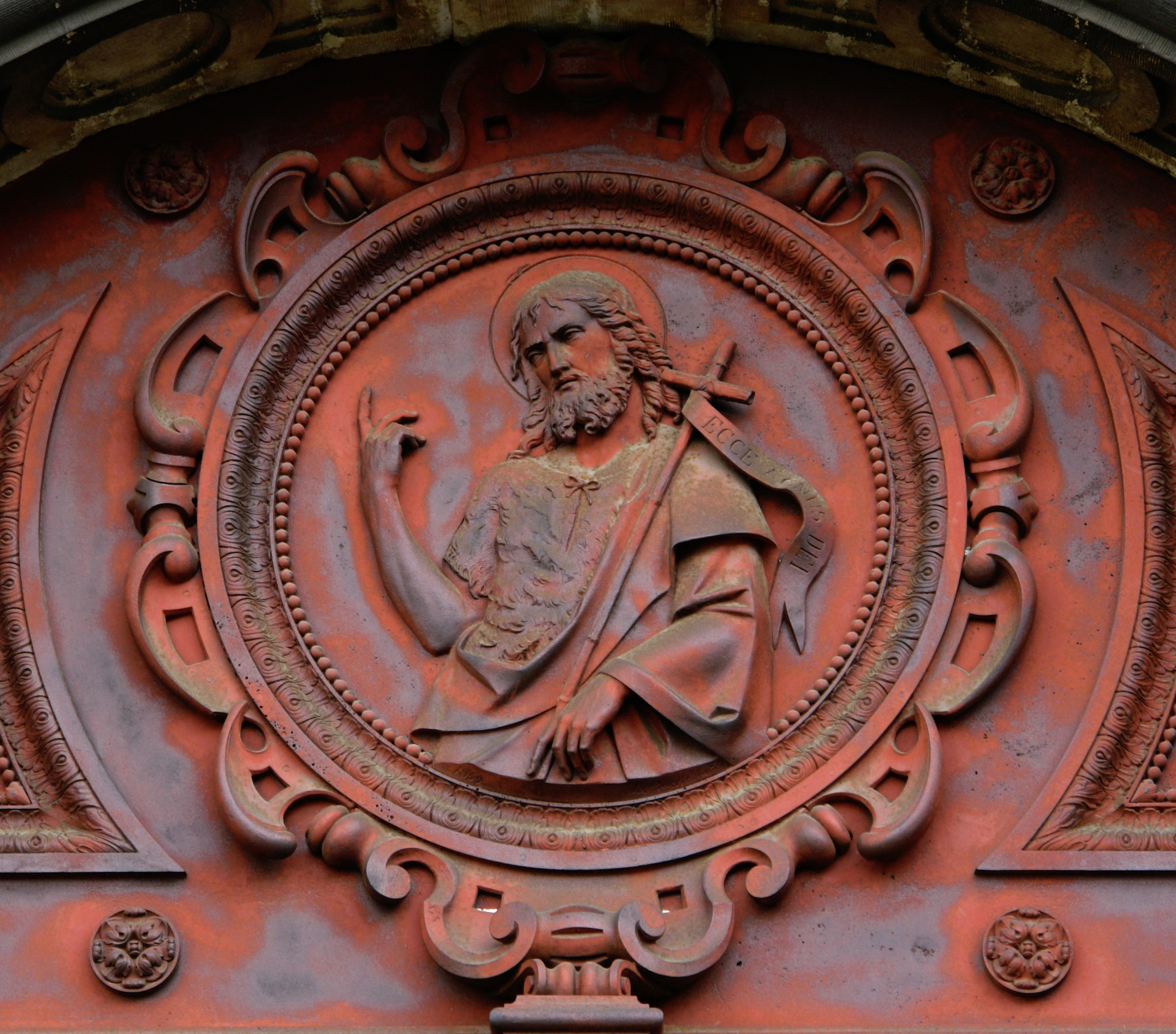
Detail of the portal

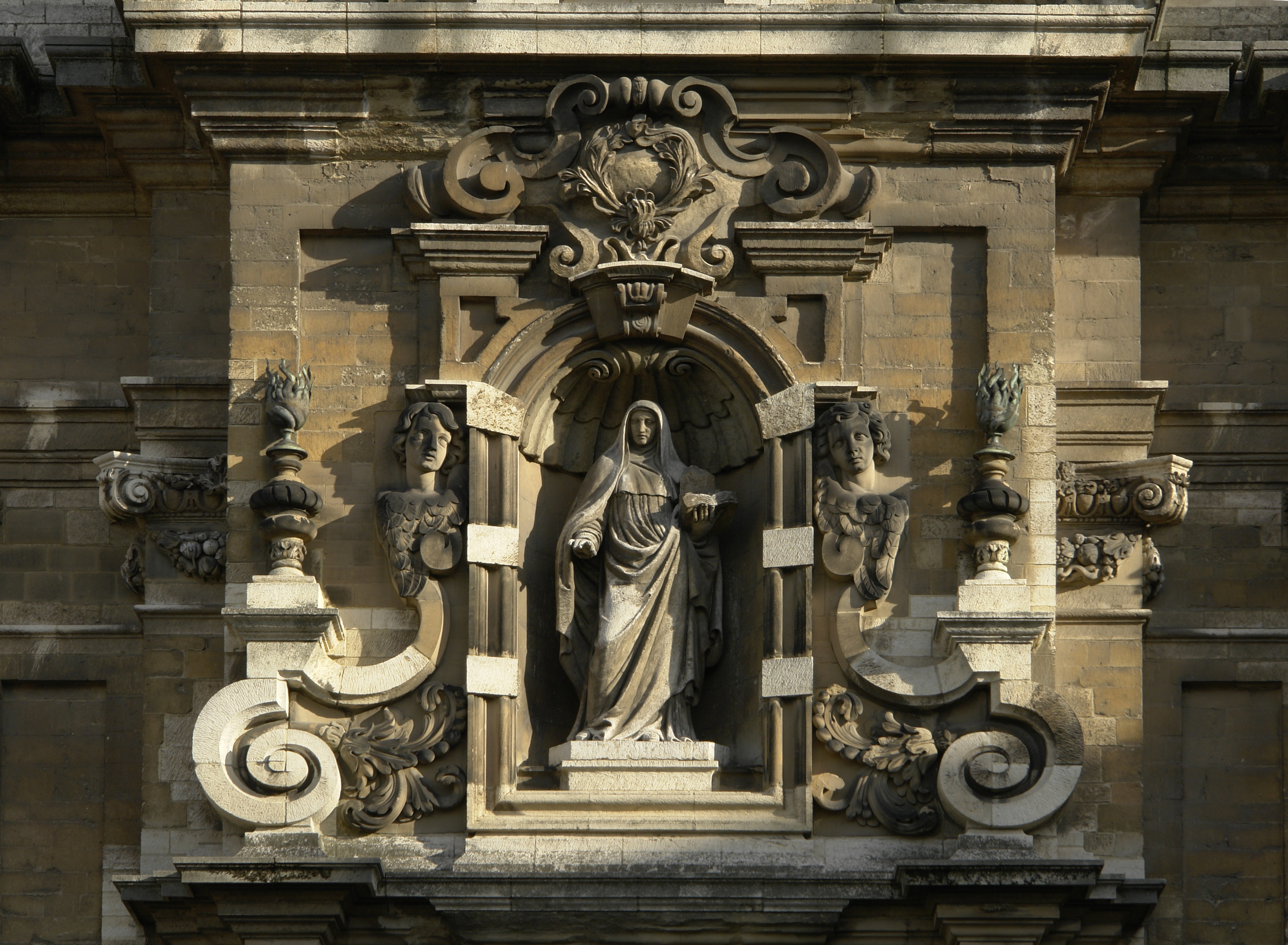
Statue of Saint Begga, above the portal

=== Interior ===
The interior is composed of three naves of six bays, a transept and a one-bay choir terminating in a five-sided apse. The choir is flanked by chapels ending in semicircular apses, while additional chapels connect the side aisles to the arms of the transept. The interior is characterised by the breadth of the nave, the height of its arcades and the spacious transept. Its architectural decoration combines Baroque elements with surviving structural features reminiscent of Gothic architecture. The contrast between the light-coloured stonework and the exposed brick vaults is particularly notable.

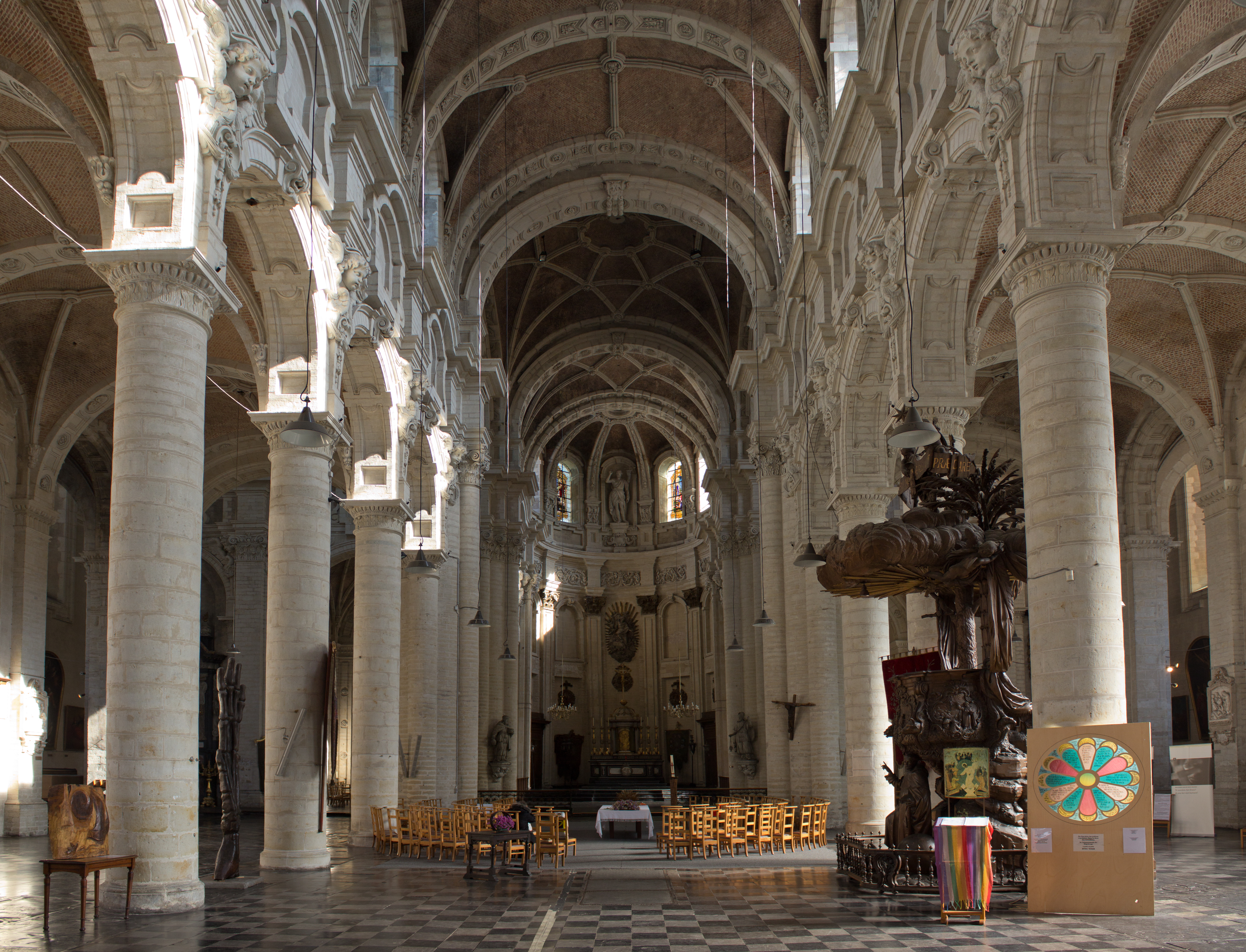
The nave

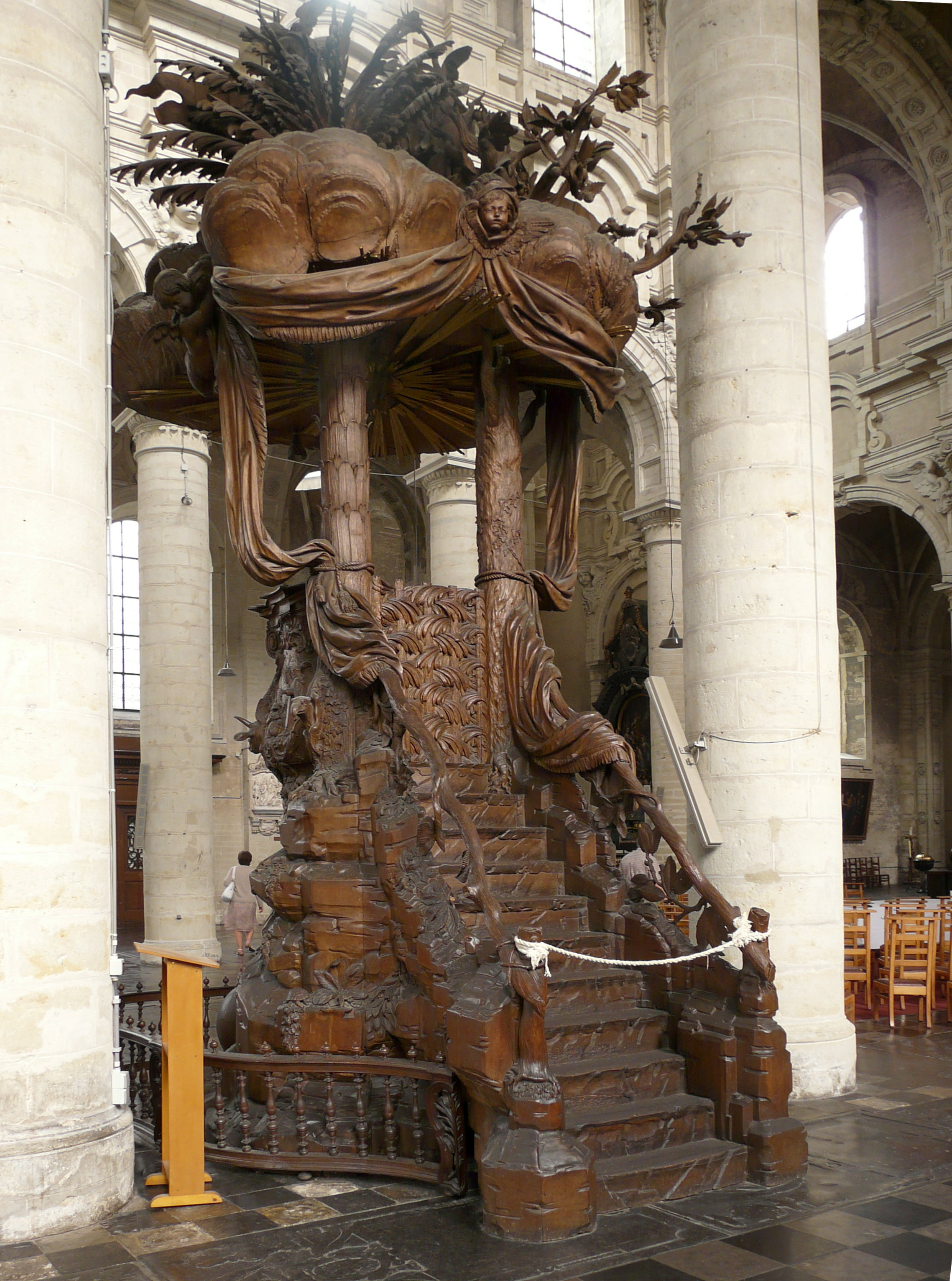
Pulpit

Organ

== See also ==
- List of churches in Brussels
- Catholic Church in Belgium
- History of Brussels
- Culture of Belgium
- Belgium in the long nineteenth century
