= Jan Baptist Bonnecroy =

Flemish painter

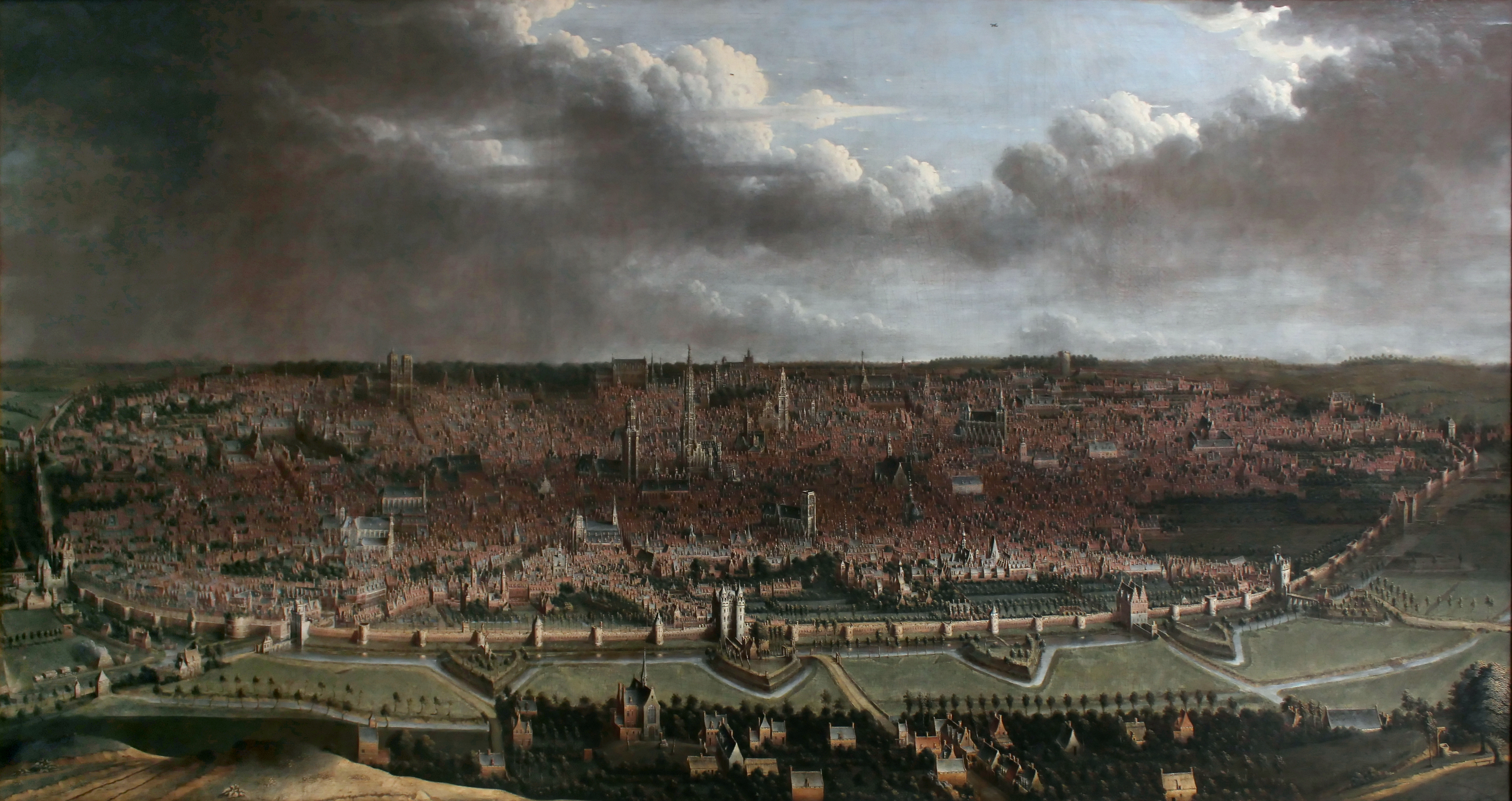
View of Brussels

Jan Baptist Bonnecroy or Jean Baptiste Bonnecroy (1618 – after 1676) was a Flemish painter and engraver known for his large panoramic city views and marine paintings.

== Life ==
Jan Baptist Bonnecroy was born in Antwerp as the son of the cloth merchant Willem Bonnecroy and Antonetta de la Forterie. He studied art from an early age but renounced an artistic career at the age of 20 to enter a Franciscans monastery in 1638. He renounced his religious calling, however, and was married by the year 1642.

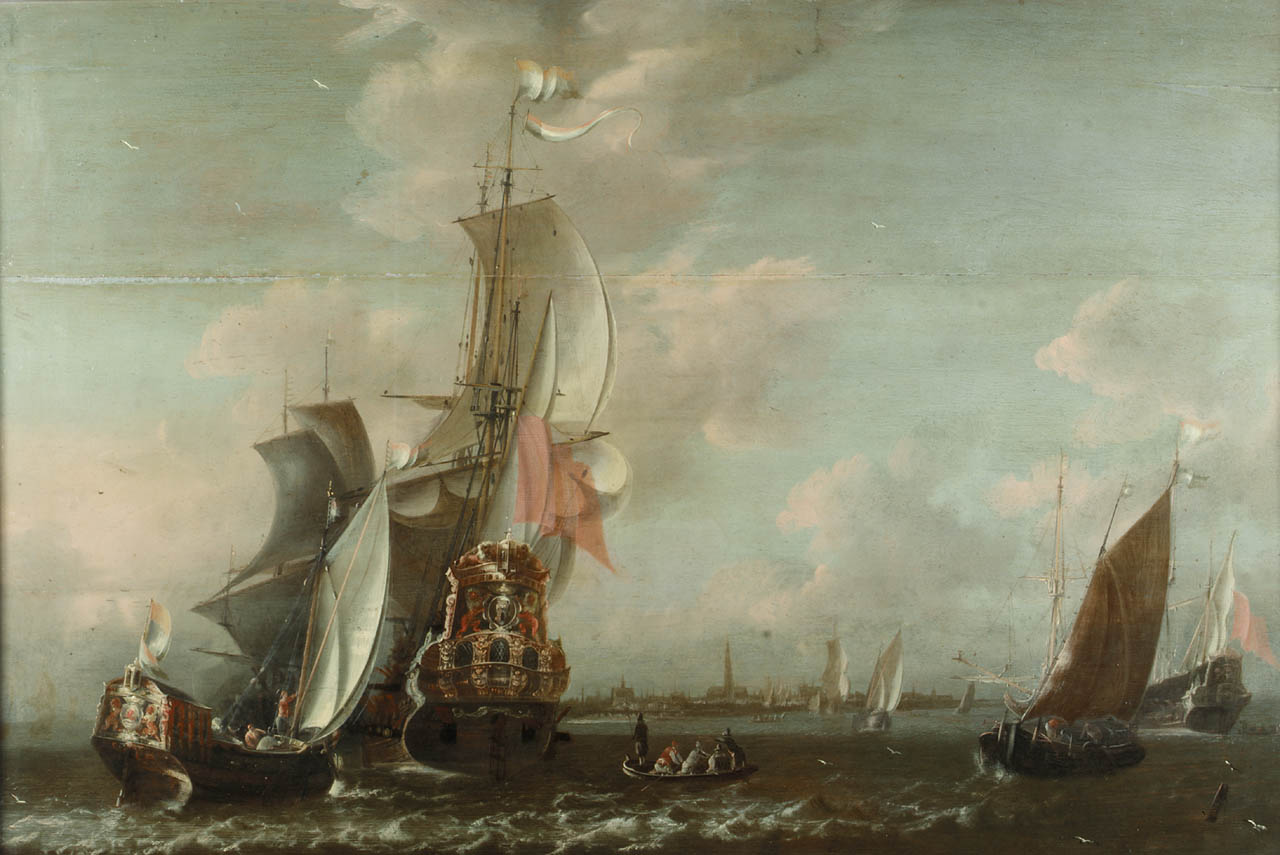
A Middelburg ship lying off Middelburg

After he had become an orphan he was placed under guardianship. One of his guardians was the famous landscape painter Lucas van Uden. He entered into a contract of apprenticeship and was in 1644 enrolled as a pupil of Lucas van Uden. The next year he passed his master test and was registered as a painter in the records of the Antwerp Guild of Saint Luke.

In 1658 he bought a house in Antwerp, which he resold in 1662. He was still registered at the Antwerp Guild in 1665 but after that there is no trace of him in Antwerp. It is likely that he worked in Amsterdam and Brussels since he painted views of both of these cities.

He died after 1676 possibly in Brussels since a city view of Brussels by his hand shows Brussels in that year.

== Work ==
Bonnecroy is best known for his large-scale panoramic views of cities. In addition, he also painted a number of marine views of sailing ships.

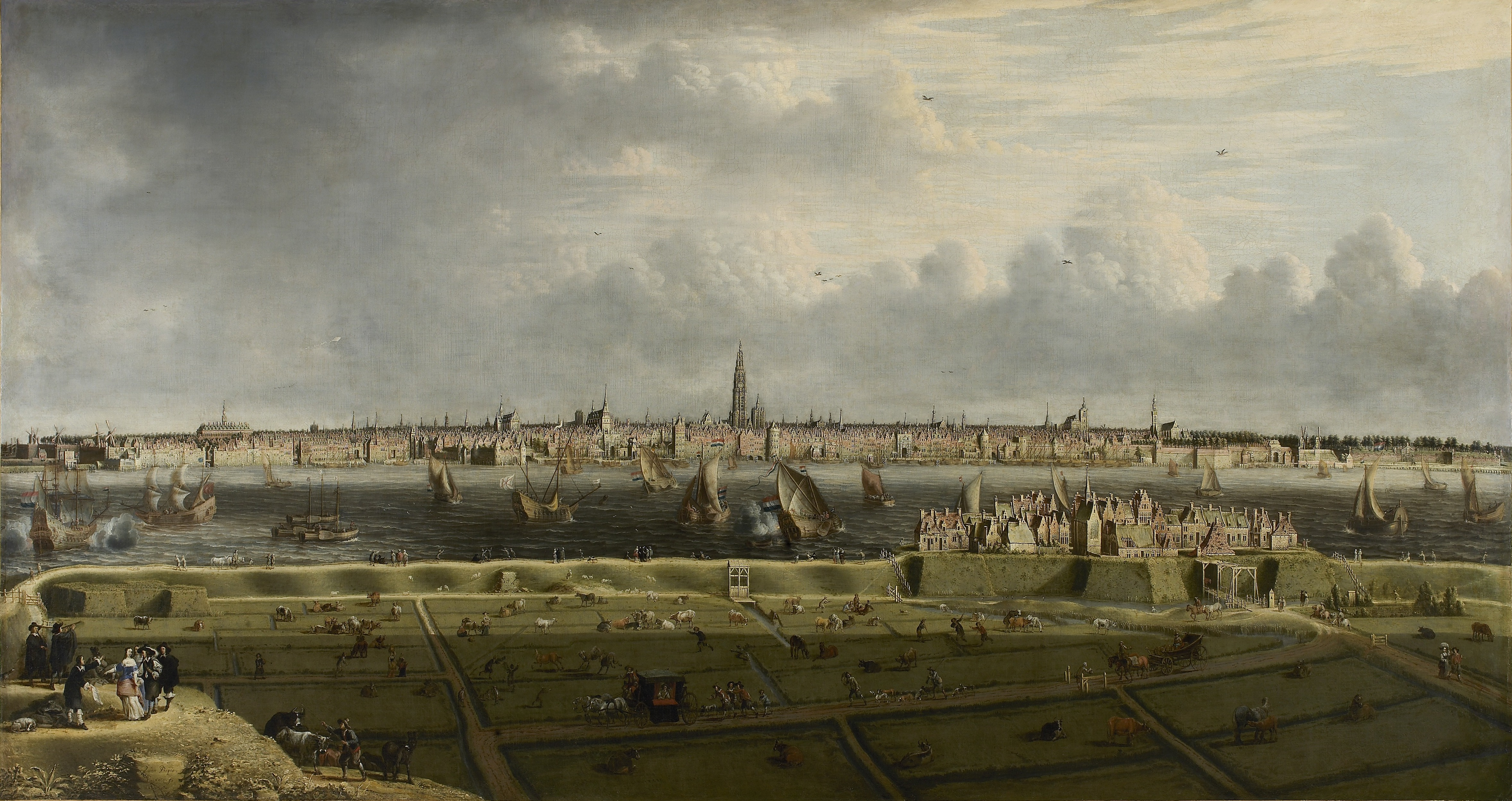
View of Antwerp port

He painted at least 4 views of Antwerp. The view dated 1658 was ordered for the Antwerp City Hall. He also made views of Amsterdam and Brussels. These views all show the cities from a distance and with a bird's eye perspective. Bonnecroy relied on drawings of the principal buildings and city maps and his knowledge of perspective to create this illusion of looking at the cities from above. The View of Brussels now part of the collection of the Royal Museums of Fine Arts of Belgium was originally the property of the Dukes of Arenberg who kept it in their castle in Heverlee.

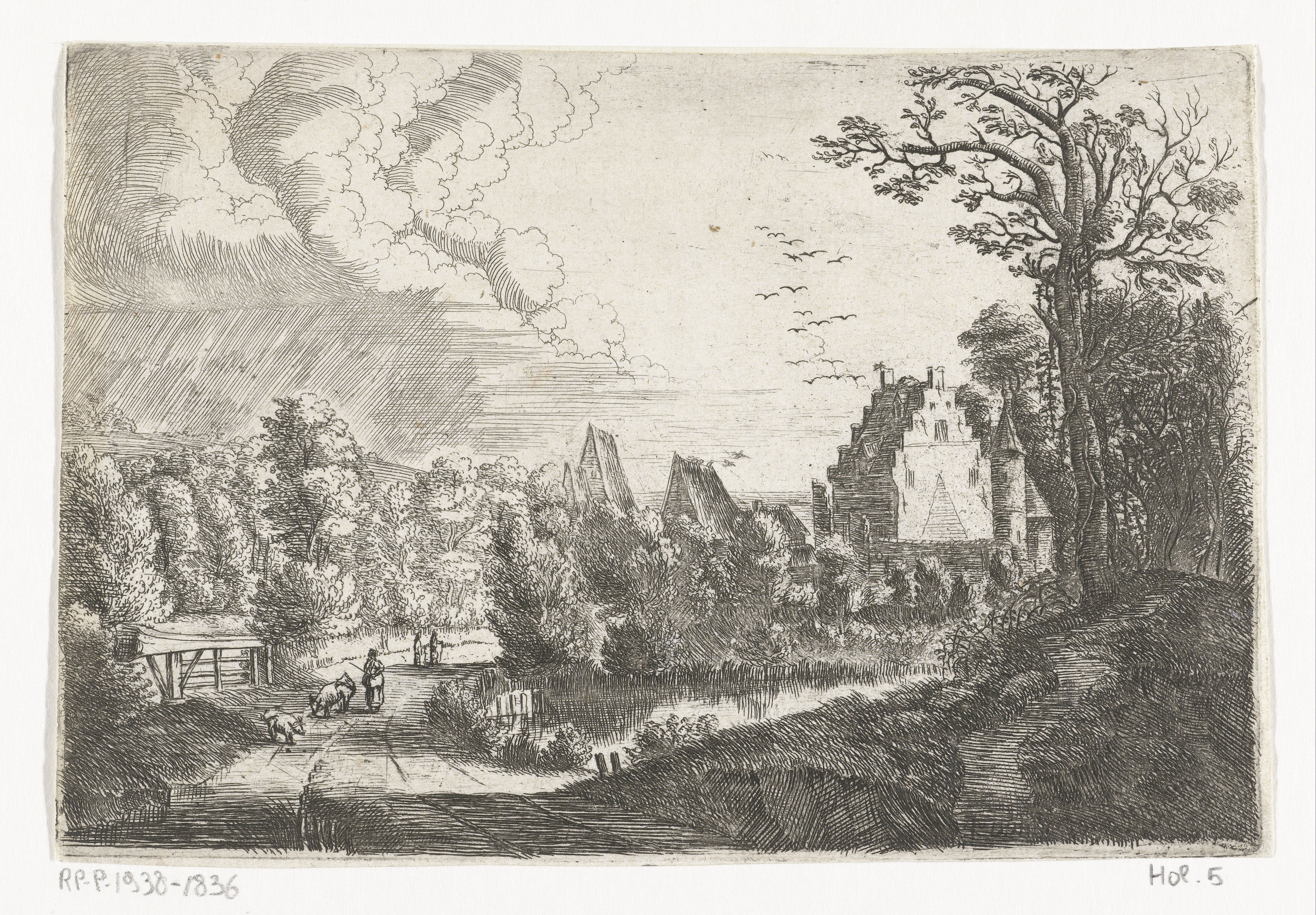
Landscape with a castle

Bonnecroy also painted marine views. The National Maritime Museum in Greenwich holds two of his marine paintings, both showing views of Dutch ships sailing in front of a Dutch harbour. The paintings are in the Flemish Baroque tradition, and executed with liquid and ornamental rendering of the brushstrokes. The influence of Hendrik van Minderhout is apparent.

Bonnecroy was also a skilled etcher. The British Museum holds seven of his etchings which were formerly attributed to his master Lucas van Uden. The prints all depict landscapes with figures and were published by the Antwerp publisher Frans van den Wyngaerde, together with an eight print by Lucas van Uden.
