= City of Brussels =

Municipality of the Brussels-Capital Region and capital of Belgium

City of Brussels: Ville de Bruxelles / Bruxelles-Ville (French); Stad Brussel / Brussel-Stad (Dutch)
- City and municipality
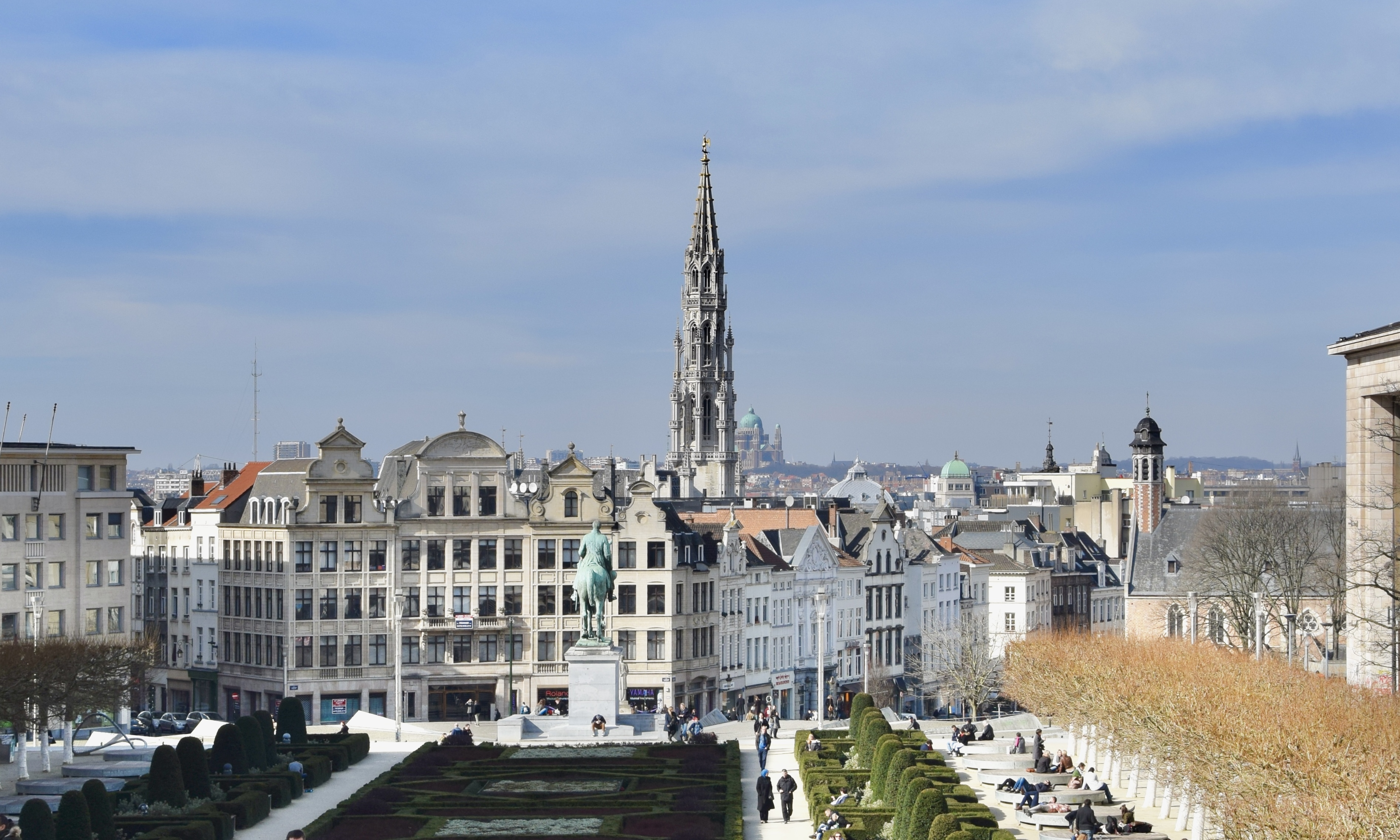
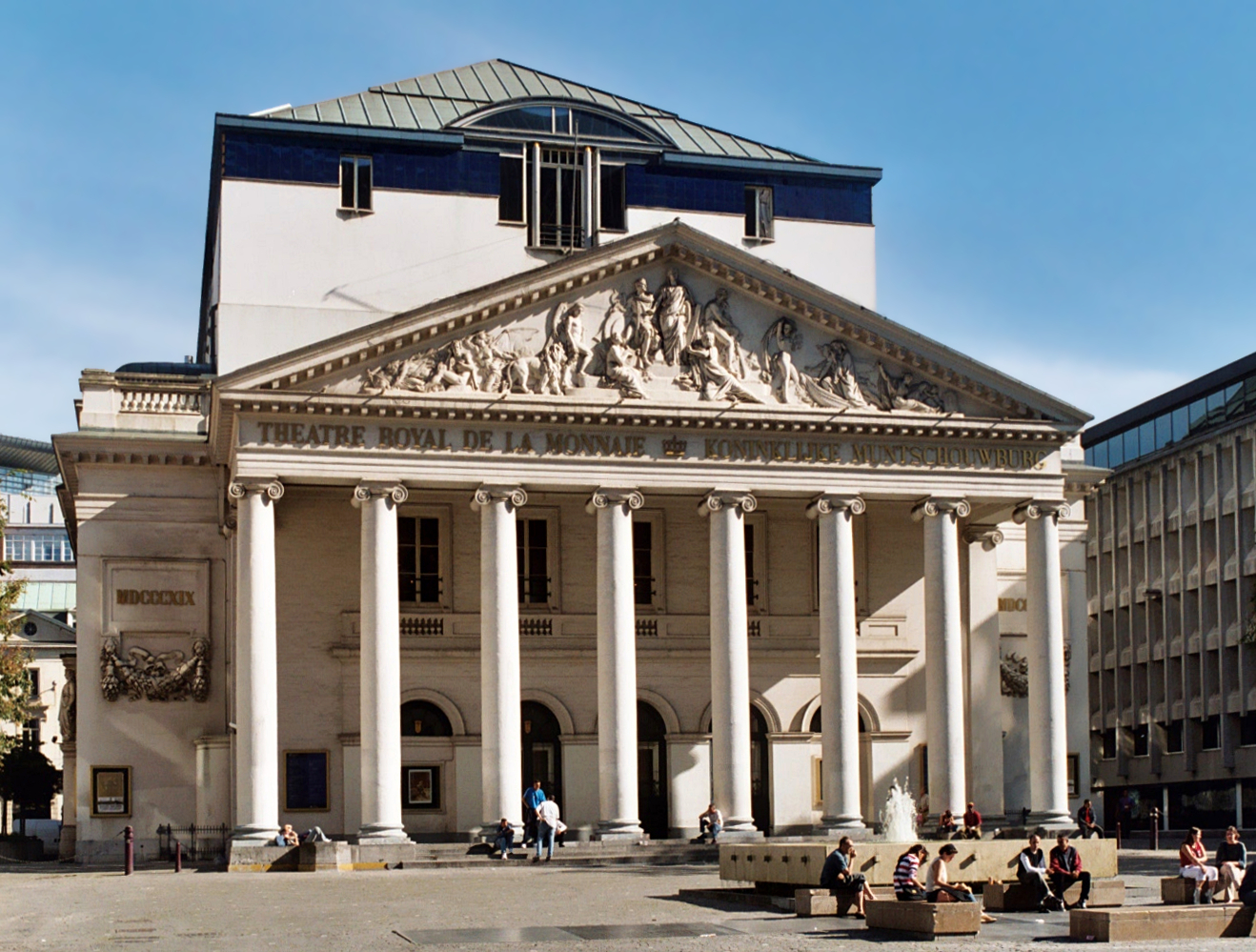
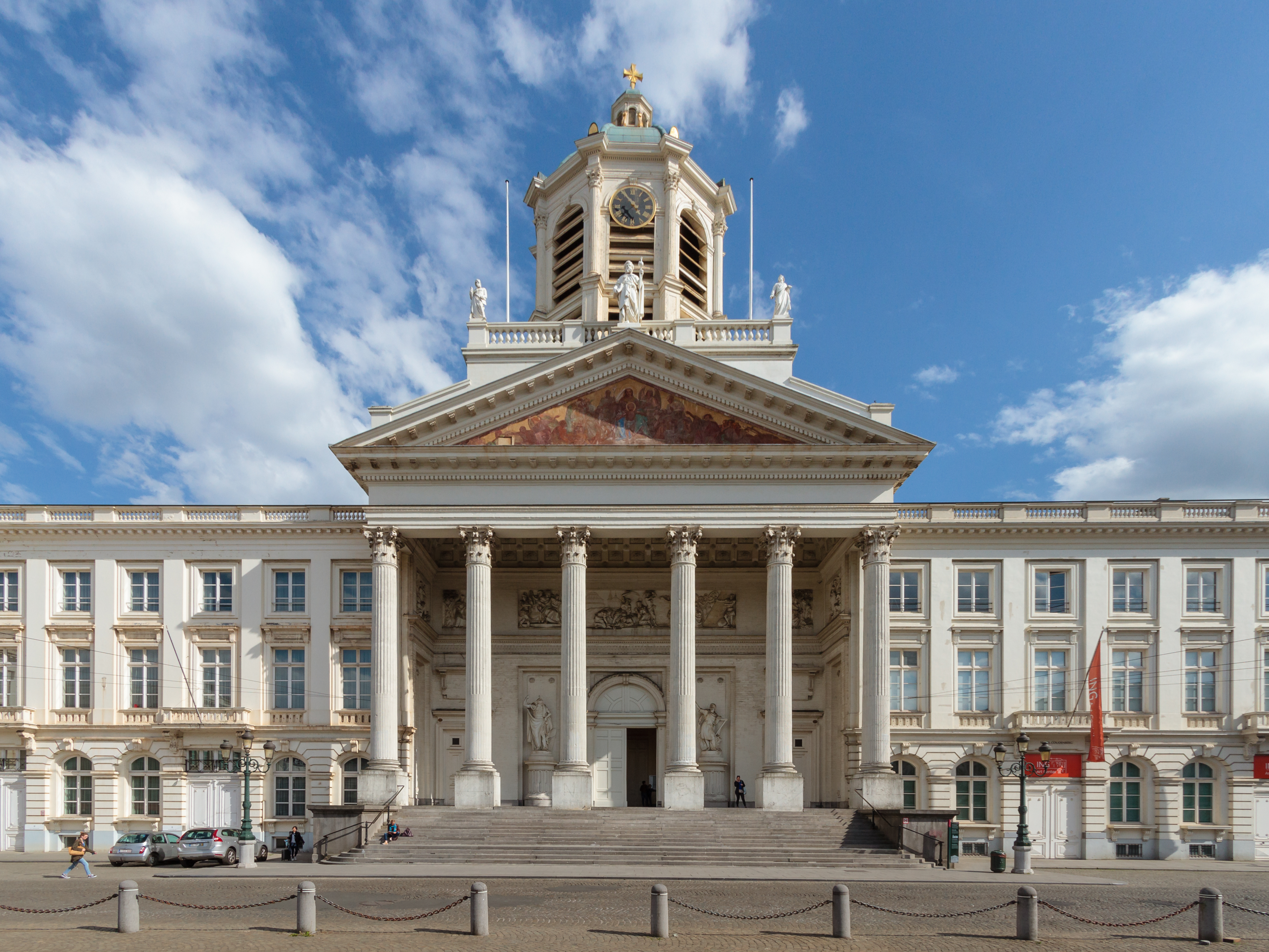
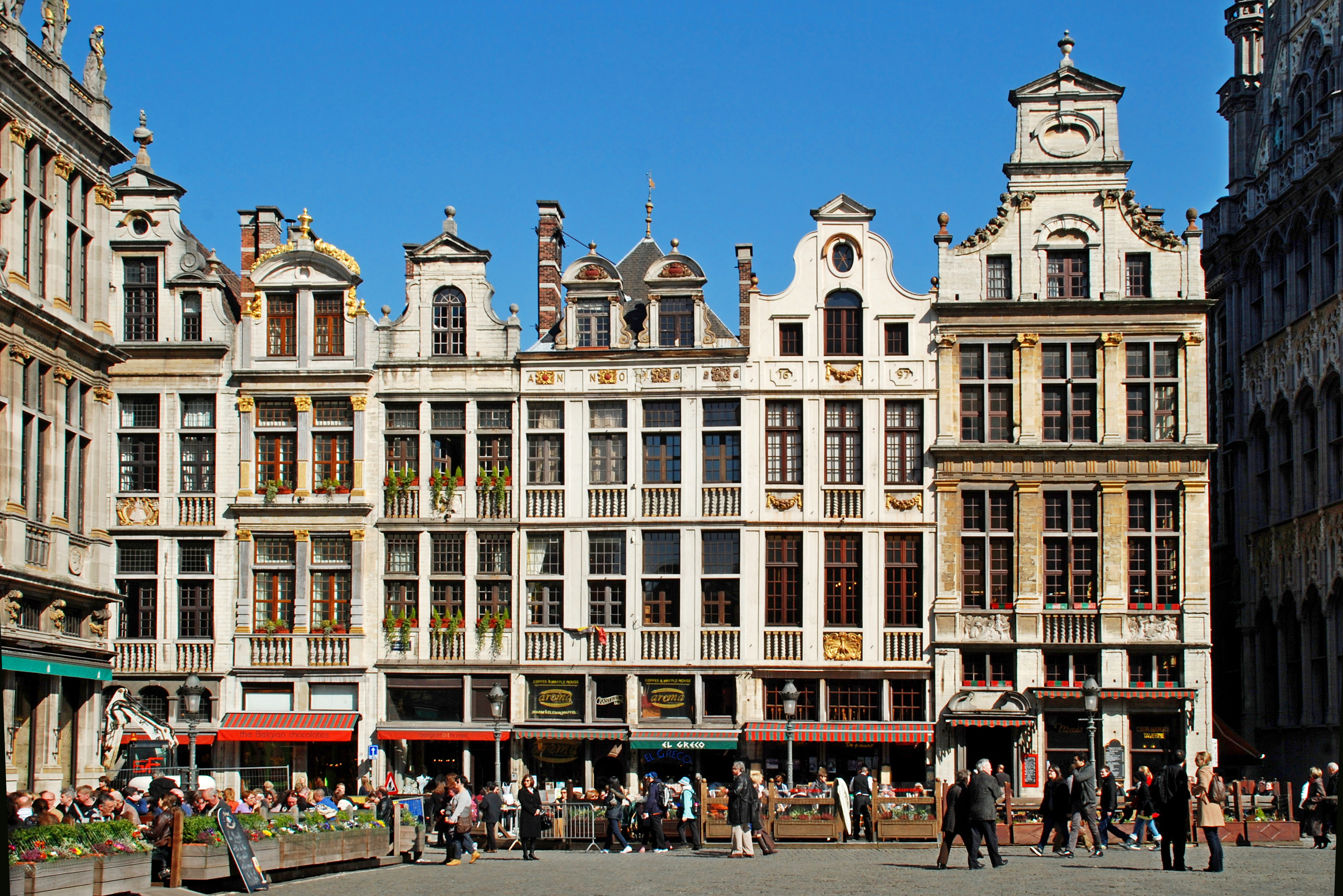
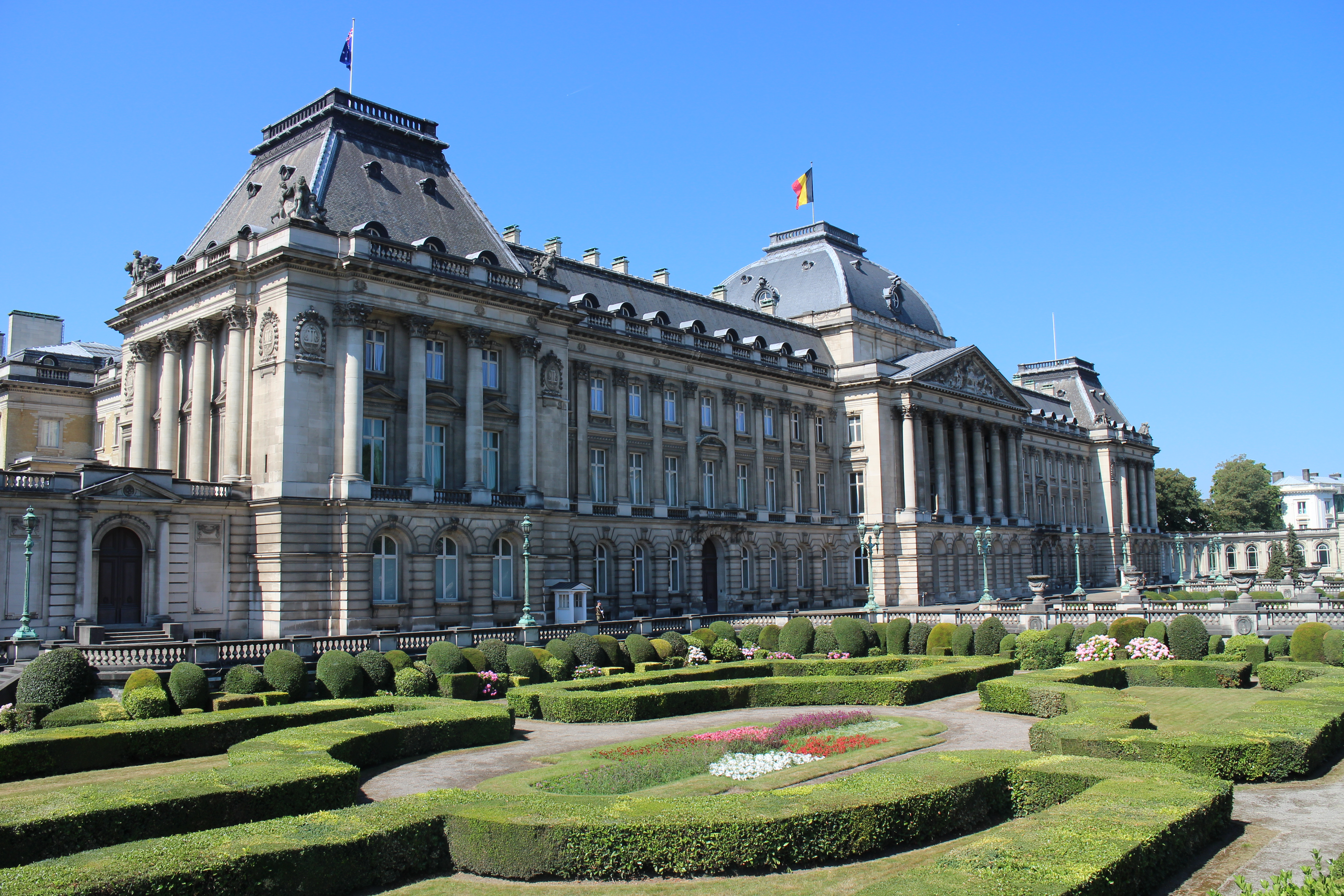
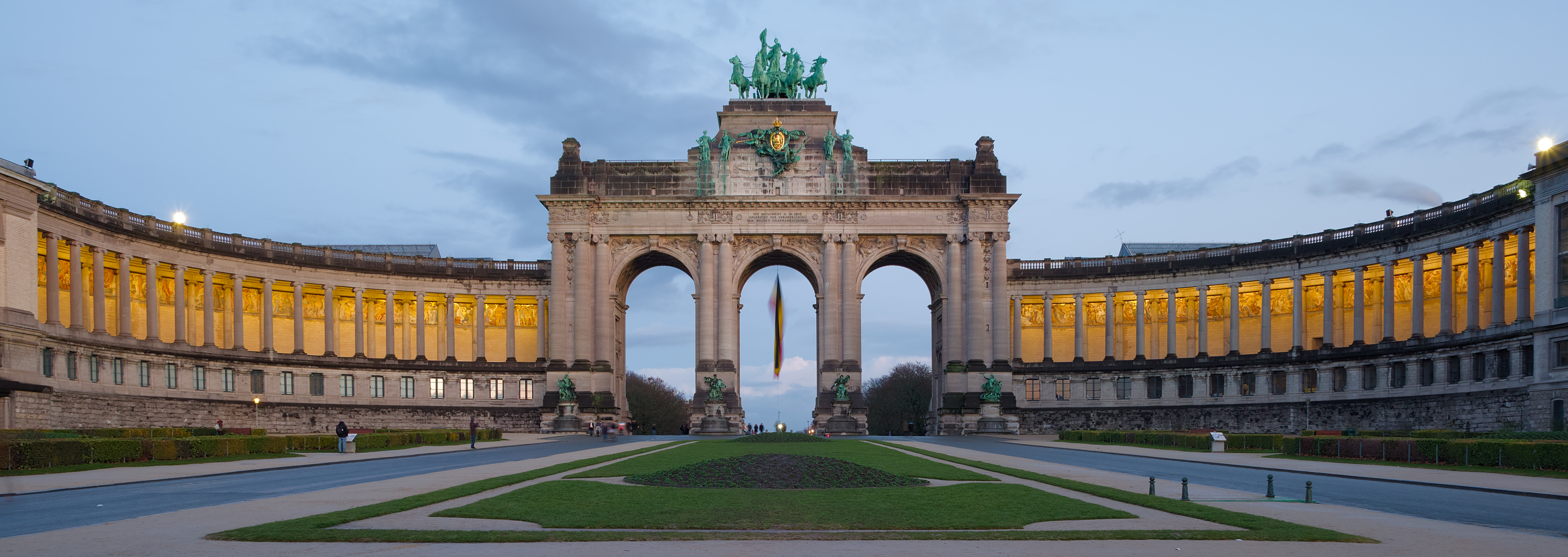
- Panorama of the city centre from the Mont des Arts/Kunstberg La Monnaie/De Munt St. James on Coudenberg Grand-Place/Grote Markt Royal Palace Parc du Cinquantenaire/Jubelpark

- Flag Coat of arms

- The City of Brussels within Brussels-Capital Region
- Interactive map of City of Brussels
- Location in Belgium
- Coordinates: 50°50′48″N 04°21′09″E
- Country: Belgium
- Community: Flemish Community; French Community
- Region: Brussels-Capital
- Arrondissement: Brussels-Capital

Government
  - Mayor (list): Philippe Close (PS)
  - Governing party: PS / Forward - MR - Les Engagés / CD&V

Area
  - Total: 33.09 km^{2} (12.78 sq mi)

Population (2022-01-01)
  - Total: 188,737
  - Density: 5,704/km^{2} (14,770/sq mi)
- Postal codes: 1000, 1020, 1030, 1040, 1050, 1120, 1130
- NIS code: 21004
- Area codes: 02
- Website: www.brussels.be

The City of Brussels (Note: French: Ville de Bruxelles [vil də bʁysɛl] or alternatively Bruxelles-Ville [bʁysɛl vil]; Dutch: Stad Brussel [stɑd ˈbrʏsəl] or Brussel-Stad [ˌbrʏsəl ˈstɑt]) is the largest municipality and historical centre of the Brussels-Capital Region, (Note: The Brussels-Capital Region is usually simply referred to as Brussels (French: Bruxelles, pronounced [bʁysɛl] or [bʁyksɛl]; Dutch: Brussel [ˈbrʏsəl]).) as well as the capital of Belgium. It is additionally the capital of the French Community of Belgium, the Flemish Community, and the Flemish Region (from which it is separate). The City of Brussels is also the administrative centre of the European Union, as it hosts a number of principal EU institutions in its European Quarter. (Note: Brussels is not formally declared capital of the EU, though its position is spelled out in the Treaty of Amsterdam.)

Besides the central historic town located within the Pentagon, the City of Brussels covers some of the city's immediate outskirts within the greater Brussels-Capital Region, namely the former municipalities of Haren, Laeken, and Neder-Over-Heembeek to the north, as well as the Avenue Louise/Louizalaan and the Bois de la Cambre/Ter Kamerenbos park to the south-east, where it borders municipalities in Flanders.

As of 1 January 2024, the City of Brussels had a population of 196,828 inhabitants, making it the fourth most populous municipality in Belgium. The total area is 33.09 km^{2} (12.78 sq mi), which gives a population density of 5,949/km^{2} (15,410/sq mi). As of 2023, there were 75,998 registered non-Belgians in the City. Like all municipalities in Brussels, it is officially bilingual (French–Dutch).

== Territorial history ==
Historically, the City of Brussels was simply defined, being the area within the second walls of Brussels, the modern-day Small Ring (Brussels' inner ring road). As the city grew, so did the surrounding villages, eventually forming a contiguous city, though the local governments retained control of their respective areas.

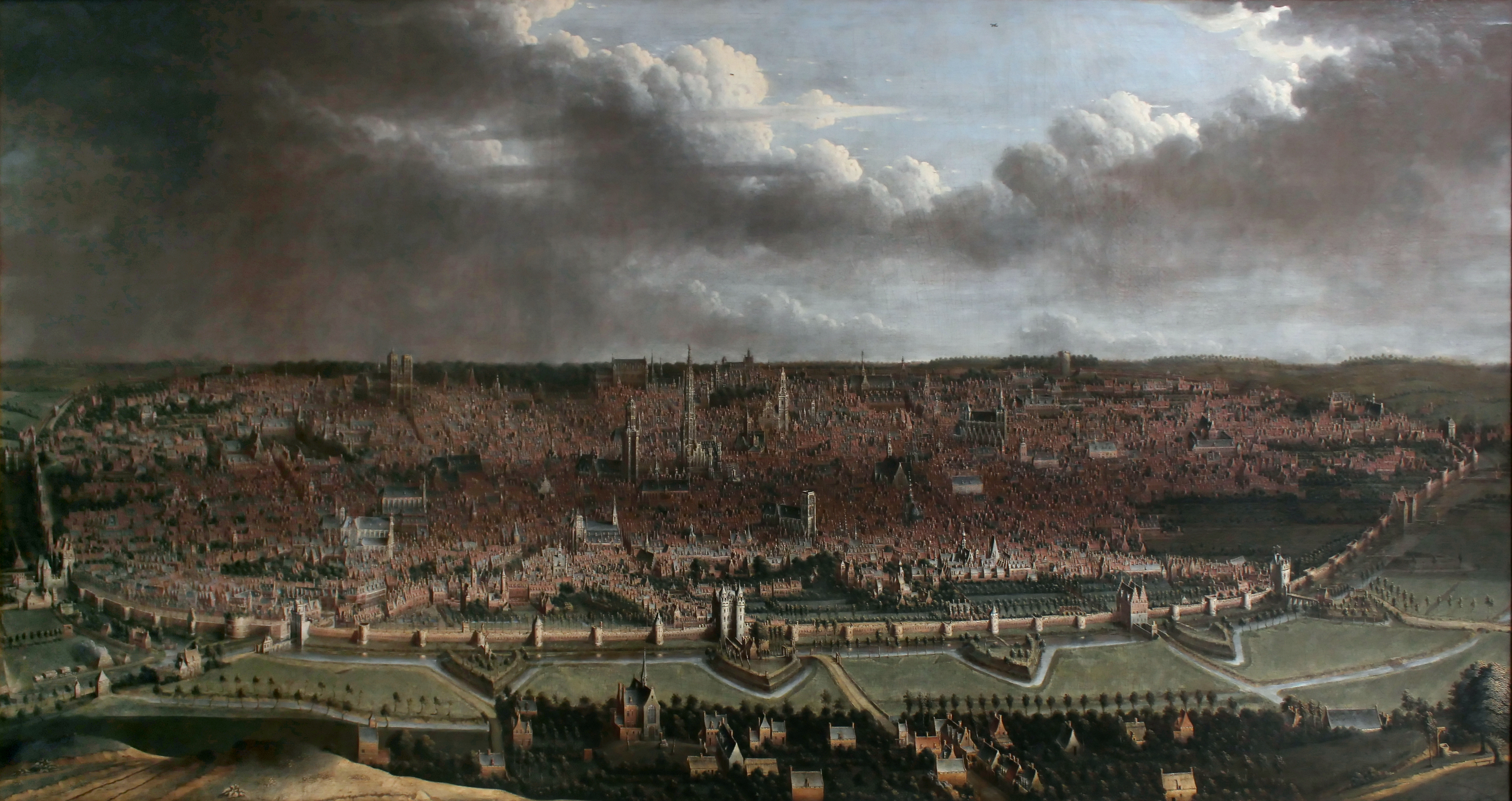
Panoramic view of Brussels and its walls c. 1665, by Jan Baptist Bonnecroy

At the country's independence in 1830, the new members of the Belgian upper class hoped to create a new prestigious residential area in the capital. An official plan for the Leopold Quarter was drawn up in 1838, marking the first major extension of the City of Brussels in its eastern part, following the transfer of a large area of the municipality of Saint-Josse-ten-Noode. The area was designed to emanate from Brussels Park (located in front of the Royal Palace), and was laid out on a grid in a traditional classical pattern centred around the Square Frère Orban/Frère-Orbansquare.

Shortly afterwards, in 1844, the Avenue Louise/Louizalaan was proposed as a monumental avenue bordered by chestnut trees that would allow easy access from Brussels' city centre to the popular recreational area of the Bois de la Cambre/Ter Kamerenbos. However, fierce resistance to the project was put up by the towns of Saint-Gilles and Ixelles—then, as now, separate municipalities (local authorities) from the City of Brussels—through whose territories the avenue was to run. After years of fruitless negotiations, the City of Brussels finally annexed the narrow band of land needed for the avenue, in addition to the Bois de la Cambre itself, in April 1864. That decision accounts for the unusual shape of today's City of Brussels and for the separation of Ixelles into two separate areas.

To the east, in 1853, following the bankruptcy of Saint-Josse's municipal administration, the City of Brussels purchased half of this municipality. Nowadays, this is the Squares Quarter, the only part of the Brussels municipality to have the same postal code (1040) as the municipality of Etterbeek. Further east, in 1880, a former military exercise ground and the surrounding land, also located in Etterbeek, were attached to the City to create the Parc du Cinquantenaire/Jubelpark, an exhibition space commemorating the 50th anniversary of independence. A leisure park and museums were subsequently set up there.

Unlike most of the municipalities in Belgium, the ones now located in the Brussels-Capital Region were not merged with others during mergers occurring in 1964, 1970, and 1975. However, a few neighbouring municipalities have been merged into the City of Brussels, including Haren, Laeken and Neder-Over-Heembeek in 1921. These comprise the northern bulge in the municipality. To the south-east is the above-mentioned strip of land along the Avenue Louise that was annexed from Saint-Gilles and Ixelles. The Université libre de Bruxelles (ULB)'s Solbosch/Solbos campus is also located in part in the City of Brussels, partially accounting for the bulge at its south-eastern end.

== Demographics ==
=== Historical population ===
As of 1 January 2024, the City of Brussels' population was 196,828 inhabitants. The area is 33.09 km^{2} (12.78 sq mi), making the density 5,949/km^{2} (15,410/sq mi).

Taking into account the current municipality, including the former municipalities annexed in 1921 (Haren, Laeken and Neder-over-Heembeek) from 1831:

- Sources: INS: 1806 to 1981 = census; 1990 and later = population on 1 January

=== Foreign population ===
The City of Brussels has a large immigrant population, with both the EU and non-European migrant communities outnumbering the native Belgians. Akin to neighbouring Ixelles, Etterbeek and Schaerbeek, the City of Brussels also has a large Muslim population, mainly of Moroccan origin.

As of 2023, taking into account the nationality of birth of the parents, 55.84% of the City of Brussels's population is of non-European origin (predominantly Moroccan, Indian and Congolese), 27.21% is of European origin other than Belgian (mainly French, Romanian, Italian, Spanish, and Polish), while 16.94% is solely of native Belgian ancestry. Among all major migrant groups from outside the EU, a majority of the permanent residents have acquired Belgian nationality.

Migrant communities in the City of Brussels with over 1,000 people as of 1 January 2020:

France	9,049
Morocco	7,431
Romania	7,057
Italy	5,175
Spain	4,690
Poland	2,777
Portugal	1,832
Greece	1,758
Netherlands	1,704
India	1,591
Bulgaria	1,573
Germany	1,565
DR Congo	1,511
Turkey	1,389
Guinea	1,309
United Kingdom	1,177

Group of origin	Year	
Group of origin	2023	
Group of origin	Number	%
Belgians with Belgian background	32,916	16.94%
Belgians with foreign background	85,377	43.94%
Neighbouring country	4,194	2.16%
EU27 (excluding neighbouring country)	6,629	3.41%
Outside EU 27
Non-Belgians	75,998	39.12%
Neighbouring country	6.95%	
EU27 (excluding neighbouring country)
Outside EU 27
Total	194,291	100%

== Politics ==
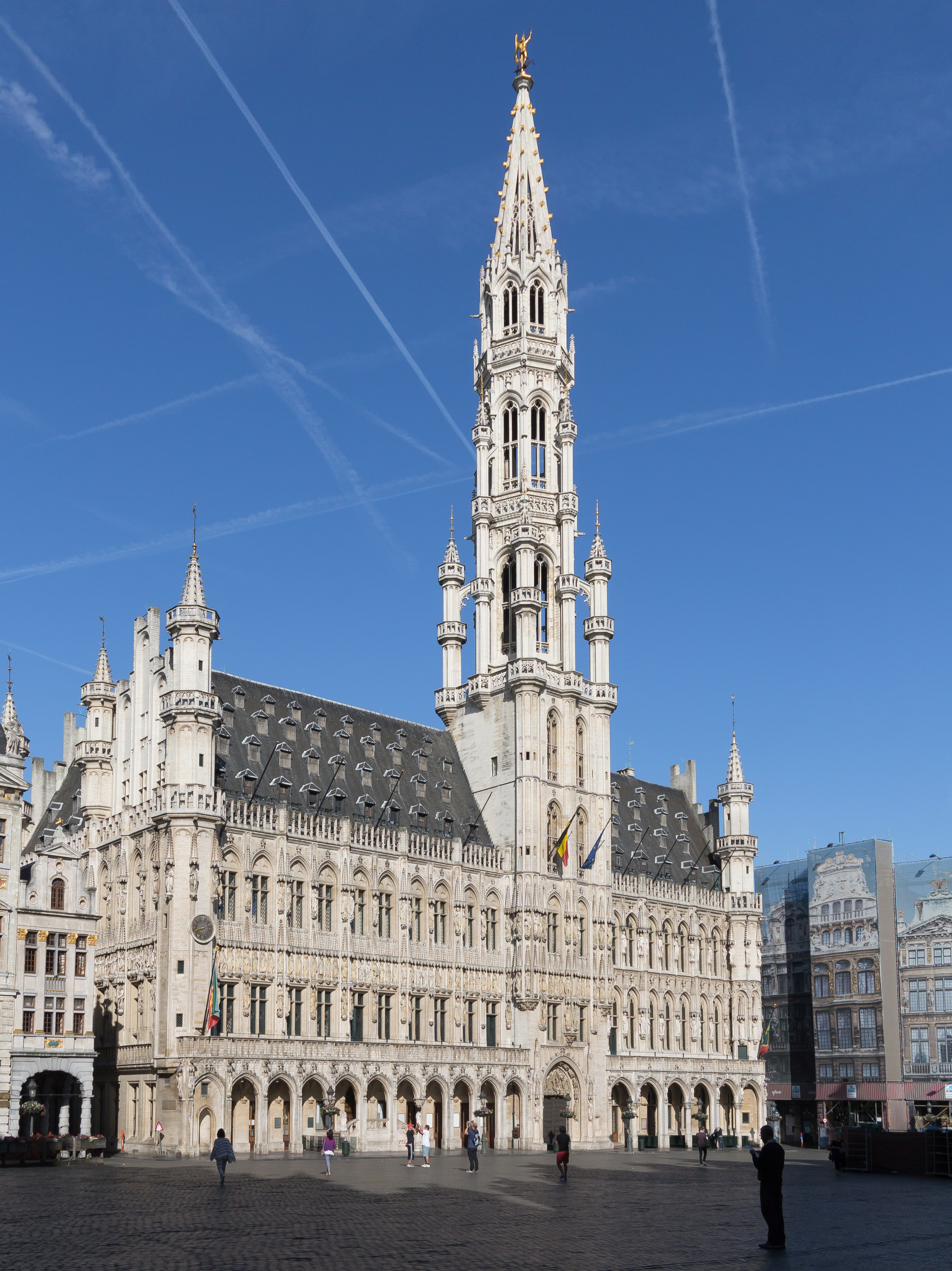
Brussels' Town Hall

As in every other Belgian municipality, the City of Brussels is headed by a mayor, who should not be confused with the minister-president of the Brussels-Capital Region or the governor of Brussels-Capital. The current city council was elected in the October 2018 elections. The current mayor of the City of Brussels is Philippe Close, a member of PS, who is in coalition on the municipal council with Ecolo - Groen, DéFI and Forward.

City of Brussels local election – 14 October 2018
Party
Party	Votes	%	Swing (pp)	Elected 2018	Change
PS	19,997	28.38	▼0.74	17 / 49 (35%)	▼1
Ecolo - Groen	11,847	16.81	▲4.42	9 / 49 (18%)	▲2
MR - Open Vld	9,772	13.87	▼4.02	7 / 49 (14%)	▼3
PVDA-PTB	8,159	11.58	▲10.02	6 / 49 (12%)	▲6
cdH - CD&V	6,543	9.29	▼8.72	5 / 49 (10%)	▼5
DéFI	5,317	7.55	▼0.08	3 / 49 (6%)	Steady
N-VA	2,606	3.70	▲0.64	1 / 49 (2%)	Steady
Vooruit (Change Brussels)	2,269	3.22	New	1 / 49 (2%)	▲1
Vlaams Belang	1,138	1.61	▲0.59	0 / 49 (0%)	-
ISLAM	1,125	1.60	▼1.30	0 / 49 (0%)	-
Others	1,694	2.40	▼1.56	0 / 49 (0%)	-

=== Environmental policy ===
Brussels is ranked sixth in the index of cities which are becoming greener fastest as for the year 2022, even though in the past it had a reputation of a "traffic-choked city of high rises and concrete". The authorities released a plan composed of seven steps on how to make the city even more sustainable. Those include introducing "a use-based, circular and low-carbon economy" and making the city "proactive". The city should become a "10-minute city" meaning "making the facilities essential to urban life accessible to every inhabitant in less than 10 minutes". Green spaces should be expanded. The plan includes participation of the population in decision-making and high life level for all.

== Honorary citizens ==
Among the recipients of the honorary citizenship of the City of Brussels are:

Date	Name	Notes
29 June 1945	Dwight D. Eisenhower	
12 September 1945	Bernard Law Montgomery, 1st Viscount Montgomery of Alamein	
11 October 1945	Charles de Gaulle	
16 October 1945	Sir Winston Churchill	
16 April 1946	Sir Arthur Coningham	
26 May 1982	Simone Veil	
5 October 1984	Maurice Béjart	
24 April 1985	Gaston Thorn	
20 December 2001	José Géal	
8 September 2004	Annie Cordy	
18 May 2005	José Van Dam	
22 June 2005	Marc Sleen	
23 September 2005	Alberto Uderzo	
24 November 2005	Jacques Van der Biest	
20 December 2005	Dick Annegarn	
4 Februari 2006	Guy Loiseau	President of the Order of the Friends of Manneken Pis
22 March 2006	Marcel Hastir	
12 June 2006	Henri Vernes	
24 June 2006	Bernard Foccroulle	
19 October 2006	Jean-Baptiste Beken	Companion of St. Lawrence
14 November 2006	Cécile Muller	President of Miss Belgium
5 May 2007	Elisabeth t'Kint	Manager of the Cirque Royal
7 May 2007	Julot Verbeeck	Press officer of the Cirque Royal
17 April 2008	Expo 58 hostesses	
12 October 2009	William Vance	
24 February 2010	David Susskind	Belgian Jewish leader and peace activist
12 May 2011	Stéphane Hessel	
22 November 2011	Jean Van Hamme	
25 September 2013	Agnès Varda	
29 March 2014	Nathan Clumeck	Professor and managing director of St. Peter's Hospital
30 October 2015	Grand Jojo	Also known as Lange Jojo
25 March 2016	Woltje	Puppet from the Royal Theatre Toone
22 September 2017	Arno	
27 September 2018	Diane von Fürstenberg	

== Symbols ==
=== Heraldry ===
Coat of arms of City of Brussels
Coronet A Belgian Count's coronet Escutcheon Gules Saint Michael Or, slaying the Devil Sable Supporters Two lions rampant Or armed and langued Gules each holding a banner: dexter, the arms of the Duchy of Brabant, also those of Belgium, sinister, the city's arms Compartment A mount vert Symbolism Saint Michael is the city's patron saint. See: Saint Michael slaying the Devil Previous versions See below

Previous versions
The original arms were plain Gules. From the 16th century on, it was customary to put the figure of the city seal representing Saint Michael, first as a shadow then in a more elaborate form. Note: many of the arms of the Seven Noble Houses of Brussels were variants of these arms.
1730 arms
Napoleonic arms

=== Vexillology ===
Flag of the City of Brussels
Description: Green and red with at its centre Saint Michael slaying the dragon (Devil). Symbolism: Saint Michael is the city's patron saint. See: Saint Michael slaying the Devil

== See also ==
- Transport in Brussels
- Timeline of Brussels
- Bourgeois of Brussels
- Seven Noble Houses of Brussels
- Guilds of Brussels
