= Jacobus Harrewijn =

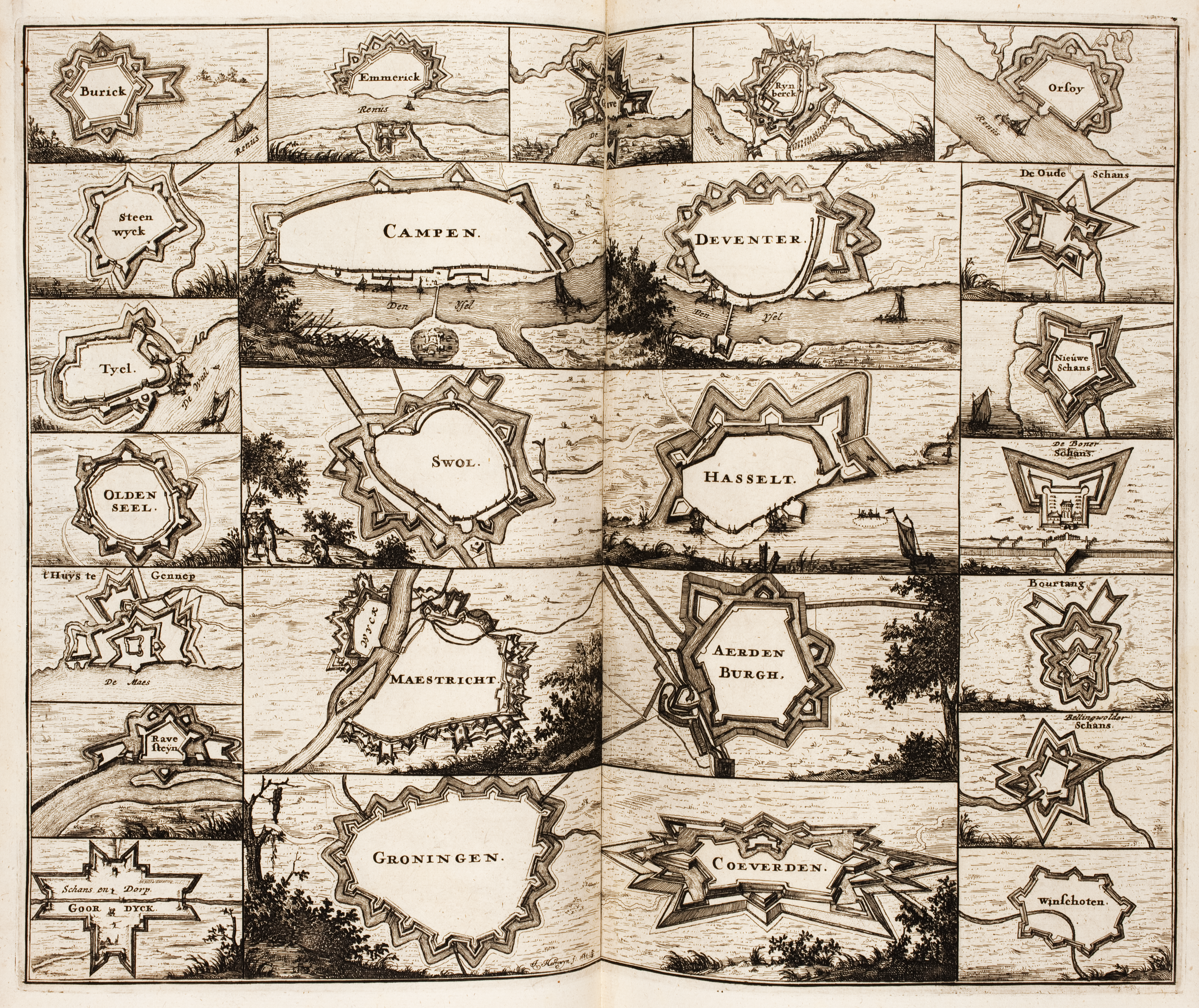
Plans of Dutch fortified towns on the Rhine and Meuse, 1684, Jacobus Harrewijn

Jacobus Harrewijn (baptized 15 September 1660 in Amsterdam – buried 10 June 1727 in Brussels) was an engraver who was mostly active in the Spanish Netherlands and later the Austrian Netherlands. He married in 1682 in Amsterdam, but joined the Antwerp Guild in 1688. He remarried in 1689 in Deurne and is known to have worked in Brussels from 1695 to 1714. Some sources have him continue his work from 1727 to 1732 in The Hague, which would be inconsistent with his death date from other sources.
