= Black Tower (Brussels) =

Medieval tower in Brussels, Belgium

- Tour Noire (French); Zwarte Toren (Dutch)
- Part of the first city walls of Brussels
- Brussels, Belgium
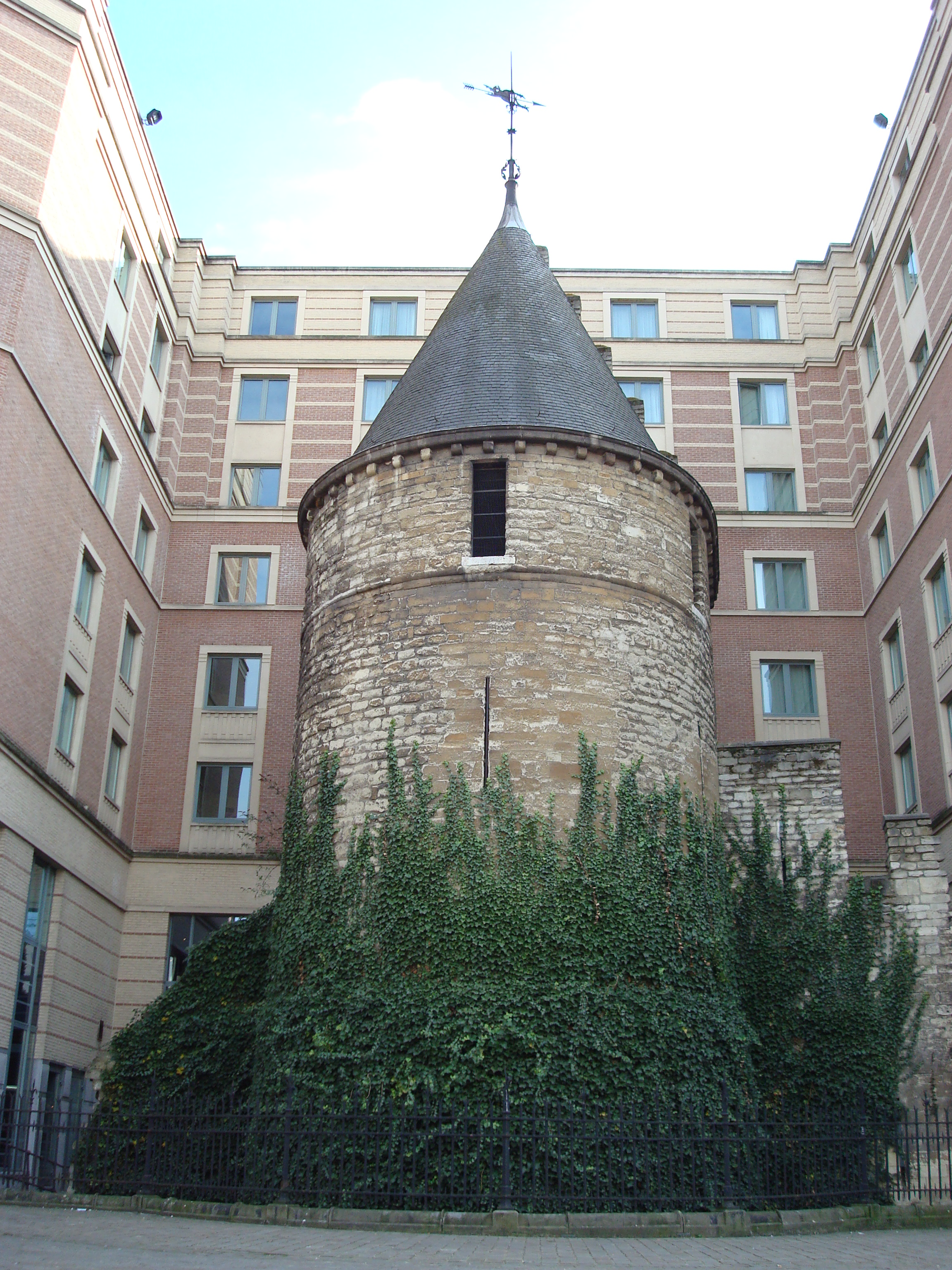
- The Black Tower, behind the Church of St. Catherine, in central Brussels

Site information
- Type: City gate

Location
- Location within Brussels
- Location within Brussels Location within Belgium
- Coordinates: 50°51′3″N 4°20′59″E

Site history
- Built: 13th century
- Materials: Stone

The Black Tower (French: Tour Noire; Dutch: Zwarte Toren) is a medieval tower in central Brussels, Belgium. It is one of the best preserved remains of the first fortifications of Brussels, built at the start of the 13th century. It is notable for being a single medieval tower surrounded by modern-day buildings. This odd sight has made it a popular tourist destination.

The Black Tower is located on the Place Sainte-Catherine/Sint-Katelijneplein, behind the Church of St. Catherine, and not far from the Boulevard Anspach/Anspachlaan and the Place de Brouckère/De Brouckèreplein.

== History ==
The Black Tower was built in the early 13th century, as part of the first fortifications of Brussels. When the city's second fortifications were built at the end of the 14th century, its original function became obsolete. Historians believe it had by then become private property. This would explain why it survived so many centuries unharmed.

In the 16th century, unlike other sections of the wall, the tower survived the creation of a new dock for the inland port of Brussels, on the site where the Church of St. Catherine is now located. Around the same time, the tower was transformed into a tavern named In the Tower. In 1888, when the entire street was sanitised, the city's then-mayor, Charles Buls, saved the tower from demolition. The architect Victor Jamaer restored the building and reconstructed the gable and the roof, as well as the bent radius. In the 19th century, it was surrounded by a clothing store.

On 1 February 1937, the tower officially became a state's building and was classified as a historical monument. Nowadays, it is surrounded by a hotel with modern-day supplies. A plaque reminds passers-by of its historical importance.

== In popular culture ==
The Black Tower is subject of an album in the Belgian comic book series The Adventures of Nero by Marc Sleen. In the story De Zwarte Toren ("The Black Tower") (1983), Nero visits Brussels and discovers mysterious activities occurring in the tower. Based on this story, the proprietors of the Marc Sleen Museum made the tower part of a special Nero route, which takes visitors to several parts of Brussels that play an important role in certain Nero albums.

== See also ==
- Anneessens Tower, a part of the 13th-century city wall protecting Brussels
- Villers Tower, also named St. James Tower, another tower in the 13th-century city wall in Brussels
- History of Brussels
- Belgium in the long nineteenth century
