= Place Sainte-Catherine =

Square in Brussels, Belgium

Place Sainte-Catherine (French); Sint-Katelijneplein (Dutch)
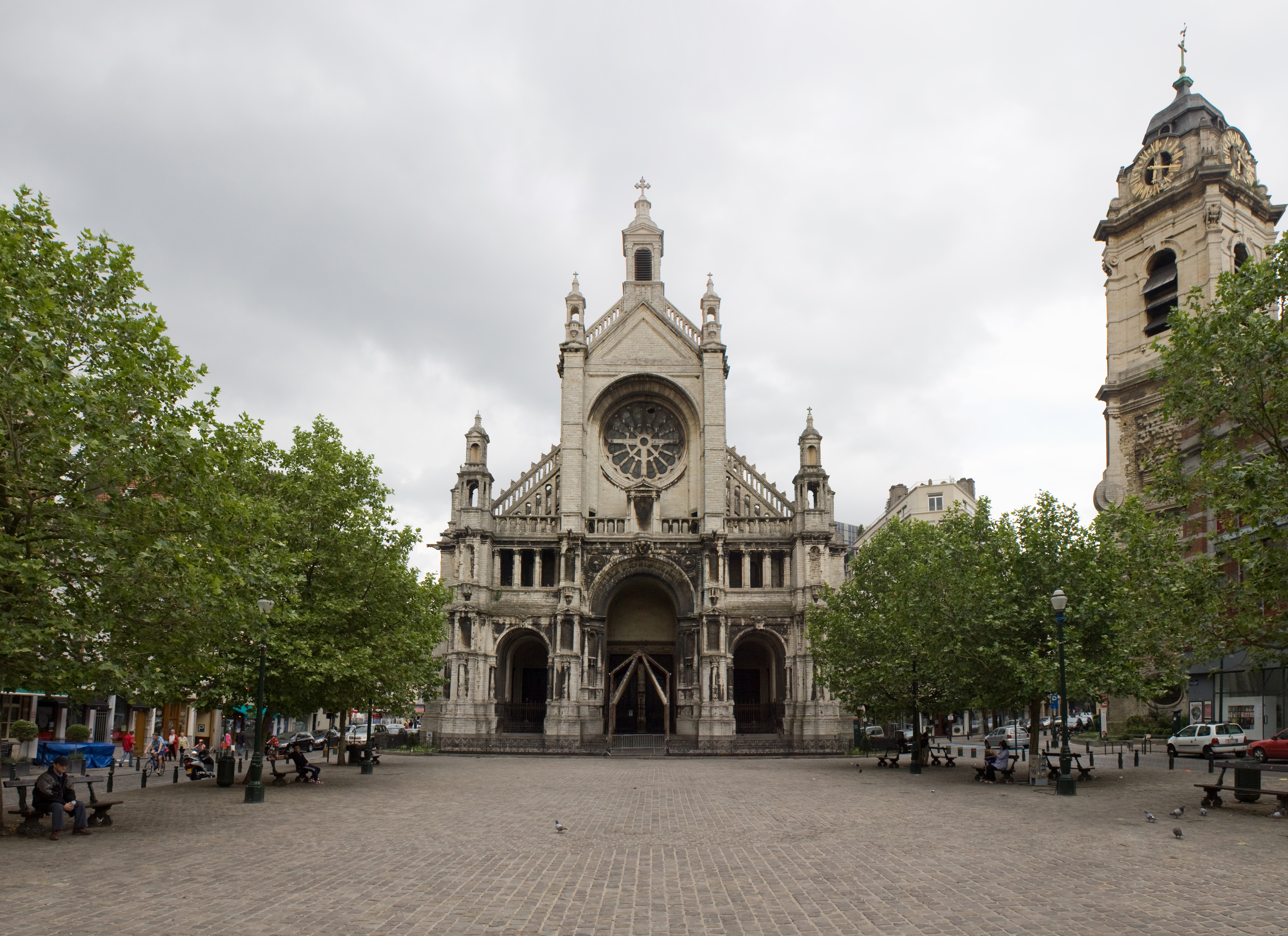
- The Church of St. Catherine on the Place Sainte-Catherine/Sint-Katelijneplein in Brussels

- Location within Brussels Location within Belgium
- Type: Square
- Location: City of Brussels, Brussels-Capital Region, Belgium
- Quarter: Quays or Sainte-Catherine/Sint-Katelijne Quarter
- Postal code: 1000
- Nearest metro station: 1 5 Sainte-Catherine/Sint-Katelijne
- Coordinates: 50°51′02″N 04°20′52″E

The Place Sainte-Catherine (French, pronounced [plas sɛ̃t ka.tʁin]) or Sint-Katelijneplein (Dutch, pronounced [sɪnt ˈkatəlɛinəˌplɛin]) is a square in the Quays or Sainte-Catherine/Sint-Katelijne Quarter of Brussels, Belgium. The Church of St. Catherine, of which it takes its name, is located on this square. It is served by Sainte-Catherine/Sint-Katelijne metro station on lines 1 and 5 of the Brussels Metro.

== Location and accessibility ==
The Place Sainte-Catherine is an elongated square that begins at the Place du Vieux Marché aux Grains/Oude Graanmarkt, extends on either side of the Church of St. Catherine, perpendicular to the Quai aux Briques/Baksteenkaai and the Quai au Bois à Brûler/Brandhoutkaai, and opens onto the Rue de Laeken/Lakensestraat and the Rue de l'Évêque/Bisschopsstraat.

== Places of interest ==
=== Church of St. Catherine ===
The most important building on the Place Sainte-Catherine is the Church of St. Catherine. The current church was designed by the architect Joseph Poelaert and built between 1854 and 1874 on the site of a basin of the former Port of Brussels, replacing an older church dating back to the 15th century.

=== Black Tower ===
Behind the Church of Saint Catherine stands the Black Tower, one of the best preserved remains of the first fortifications of Brussels, built at the start of the 13th century. It is notable for being a single medieval tower surrounded by modern-day buildings. This odd sight has made it a popular tourist destination.

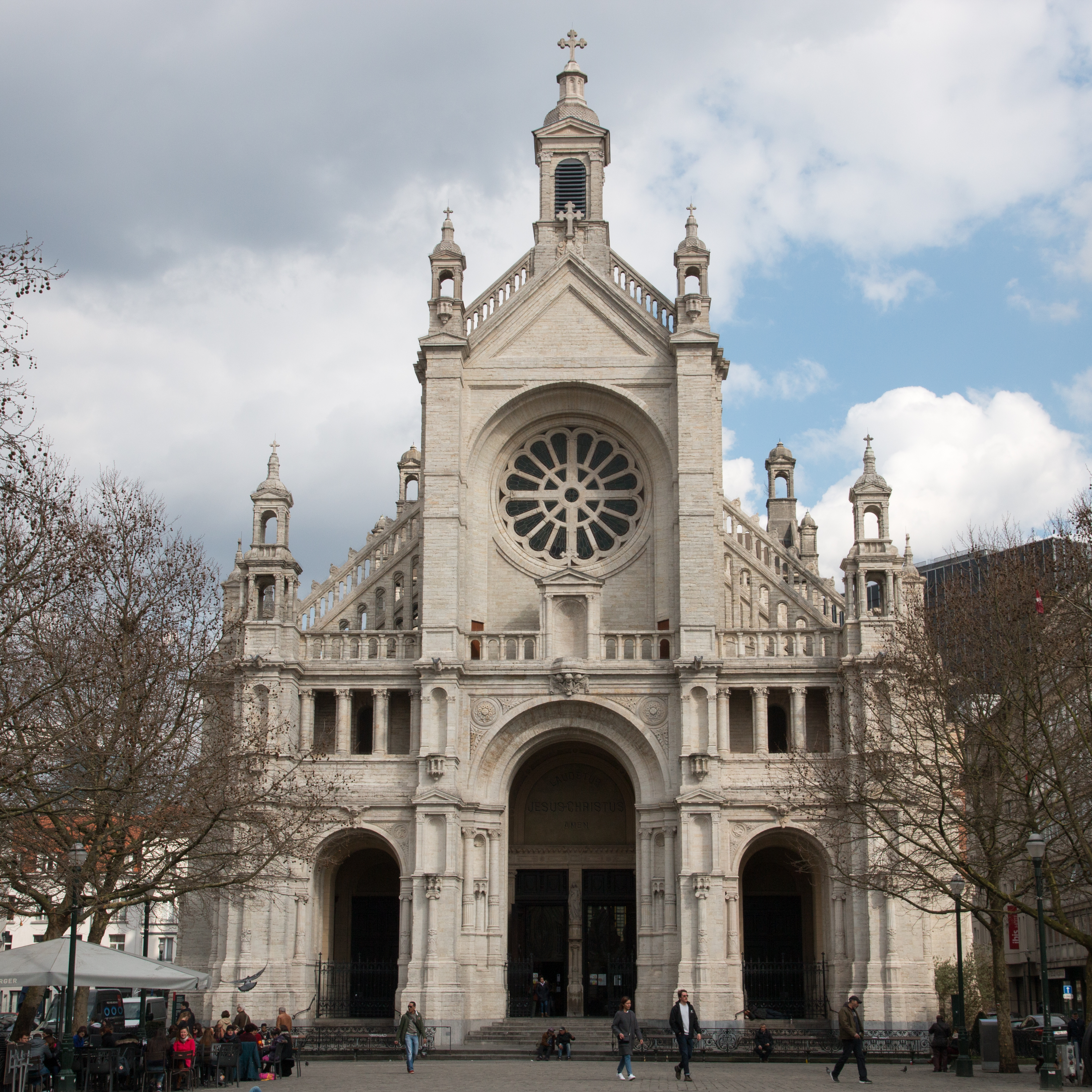
Church of St. Catherine

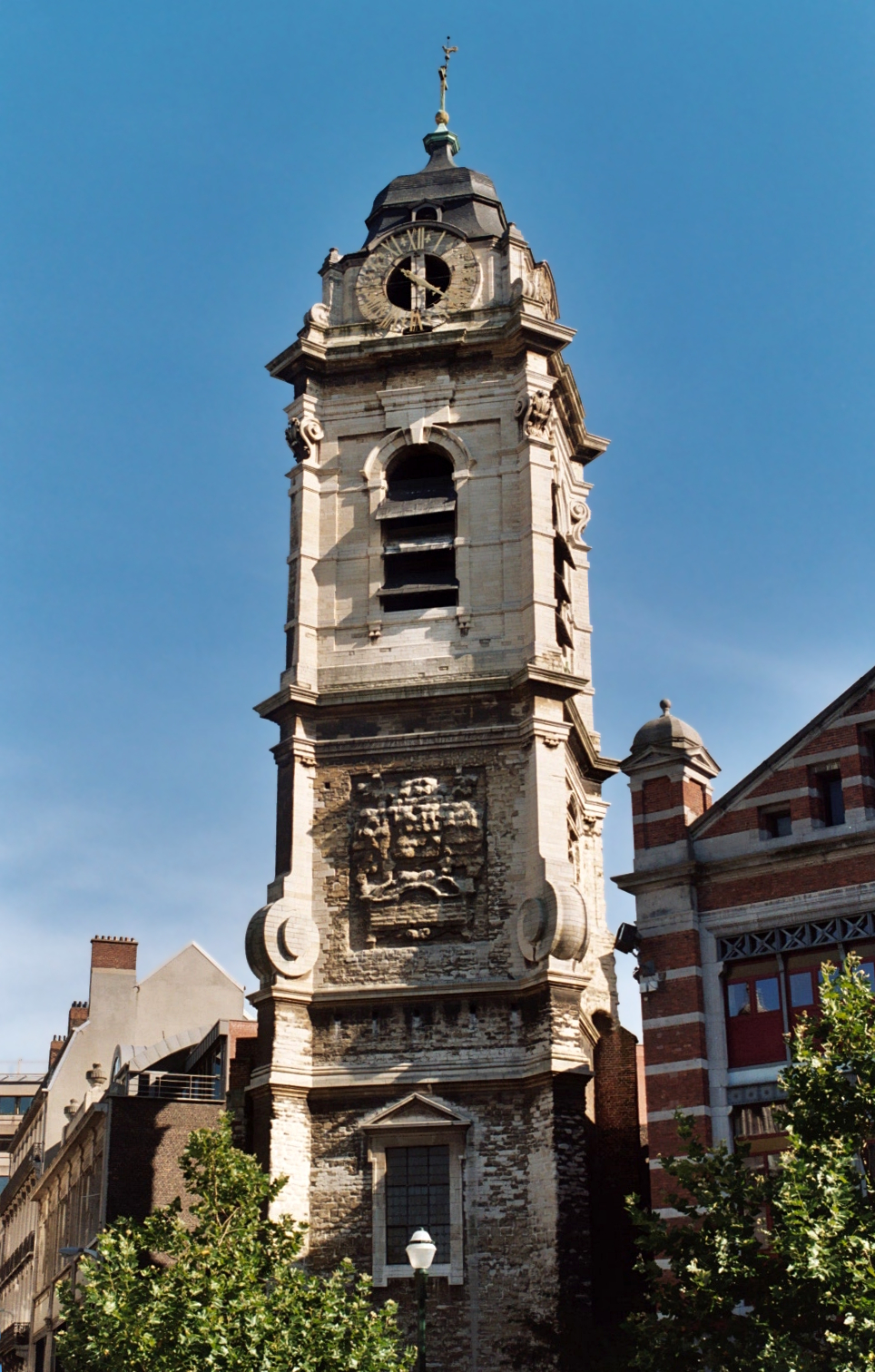
The original church's tower

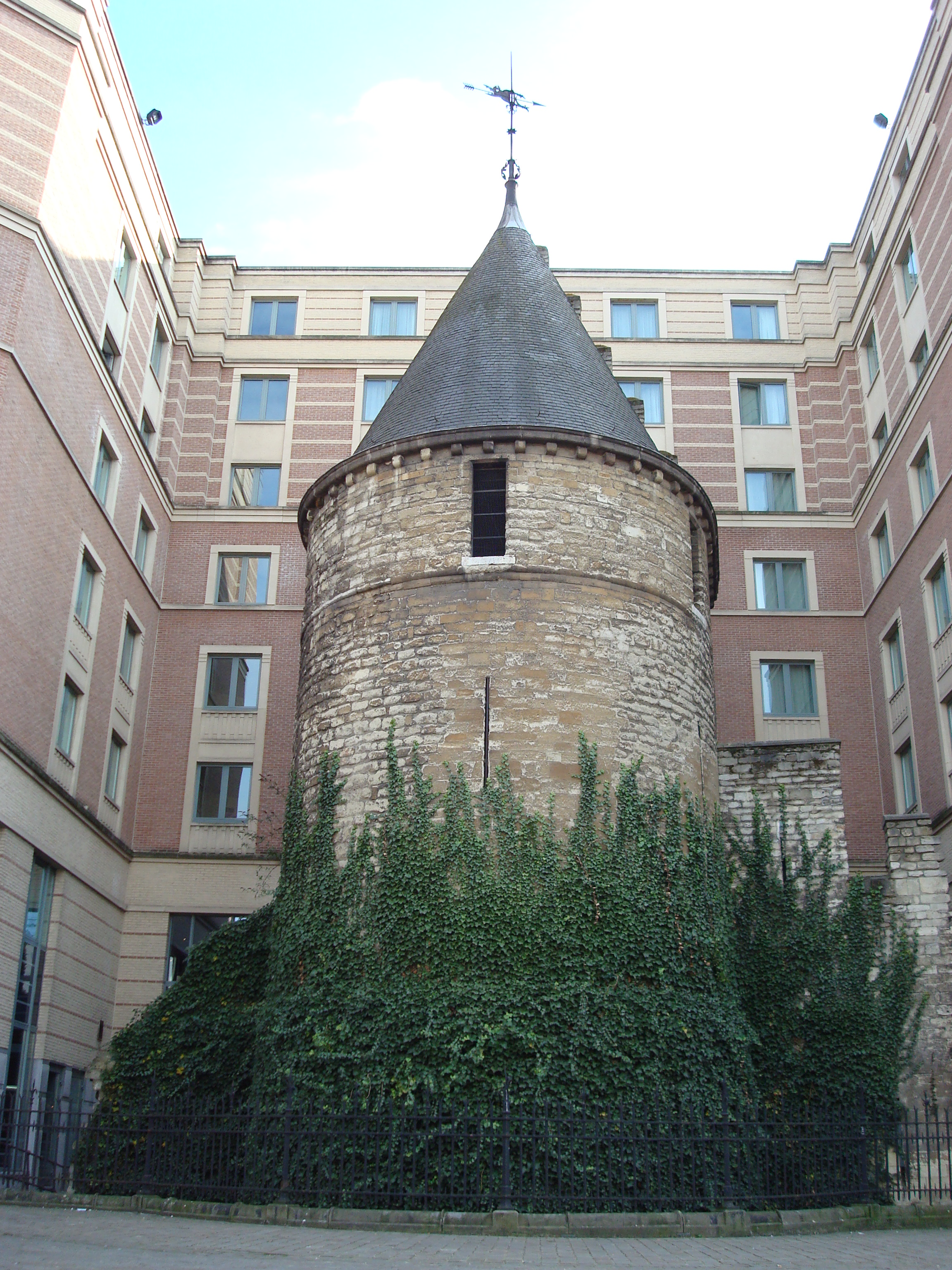
Black Tower

== See also ==
- History of Brussels
- Belgium in the long nineteenth century
