= Royal Flemish Theatre =

Theatre in Brussels, Belgium

- Koninklijke Vlaamse Schouwburg (Dutch); Théâtre royal flamand (French)
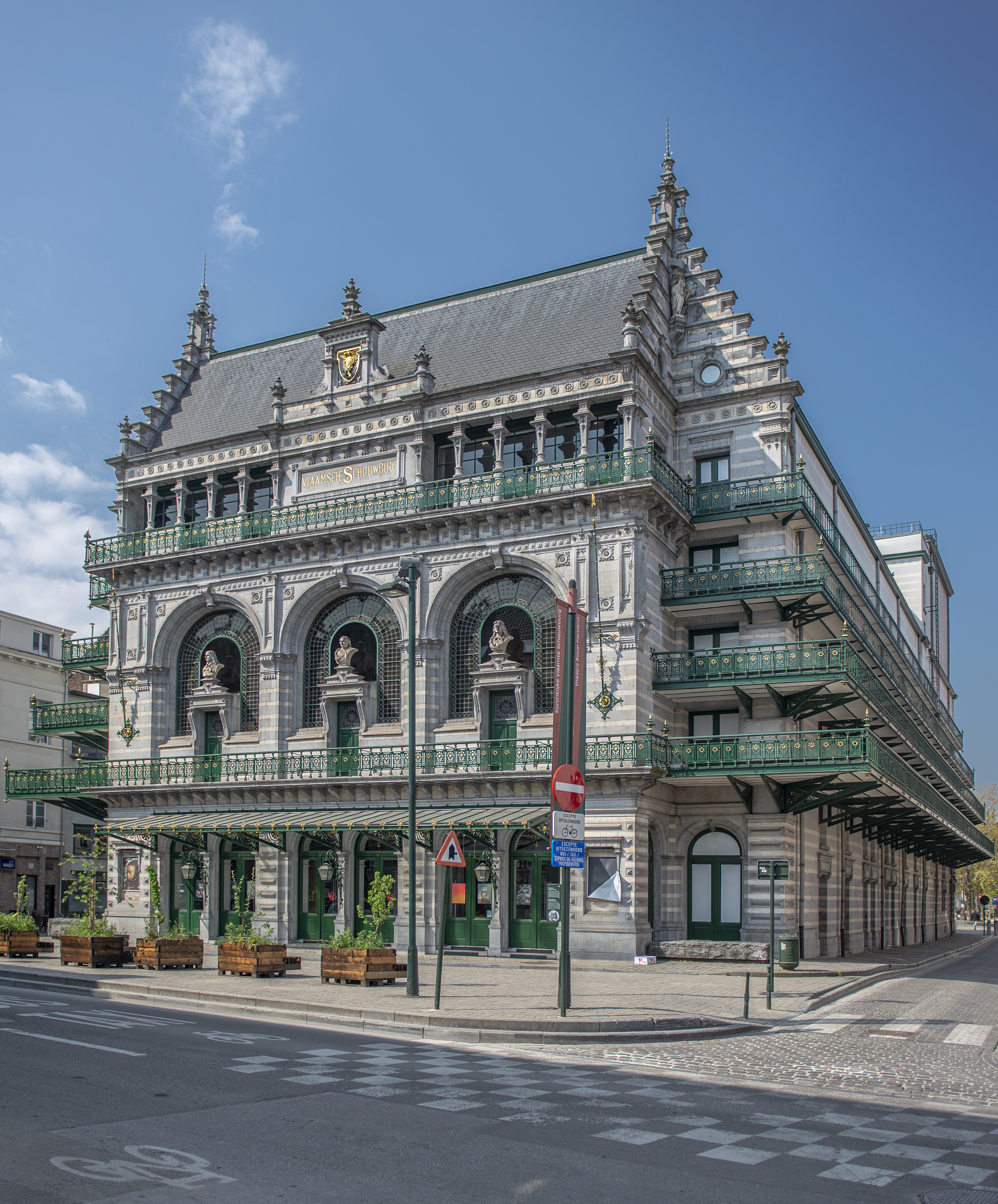
- The Royal Flemish Theatre seen from the Rue de Laeken/Lakensestraat
- Interactive map of Royal Flemish Theatre
- Address: Quai aux Pierres de Taille 7 / Arduinkaai 7; 1000 City of Brussels, Brussels-Capital Region; Belgium
- Coordinates: 50°51′19″N 4°21′04″E
- Type: Theatre
- Public transit: 2 6 Yser/IJzer and 1 5 Sainte-Catherine/Sint-Katelijne

Construction
- Opened: 1887
- Architect: Jean Baes

Website
- www.kvs.be

The Royal Flemish Theatre (Dutch: Koninklijke Vlaamse Schouwburg [ˈkoːnɪŋkləkə ˈvlaːmsə ˈsxʌubʏr(ə)x], abbreviated KVS; French: Théâtre royal flamand [teɑtʁ ʁwajal flamɑ̃]) is a theatre in central Brussels, Belgium. It is the anchor of the Flemish theatre company in Brussels, which aims to promote professional theatre in the Dutch language in Belgium and abroad. A place is also made for dance, poetry, music and temporary exhibitions.

The theatre is located in the Quays or Sainte-Catherine/Sint-Katelijne Quarter, where the inner port of the City of Brussels was located until the end of the 19th century. Its main façade is located on the Rue de Laeken/Lakensestraat.

== History ==
=== Early history ===
From the middle of the 19th century, there was a desire to establish a permanent Flemish theatre company in Brussels. In 1852, the Tooneel der Volksbeschouwing—Brussels' foremost Dutch-language company—was founded. This led the city authorities to reassign the former Brussels Arsenal in the Quays or Sainte-Catherine/Sint-Katelijne Quarter to that destination, a project negotiated since 1860. This building, originally a warehouse designed by the architect Remi Nivoy and erected between 1779 and 1781, stood at the end of an old dock, dug in 1639 as part of the Port of Brussels, at the eastern end of the Quai au Foin/Hooikaai and the Quai aux Pierres de Taille/Arduinkaai.

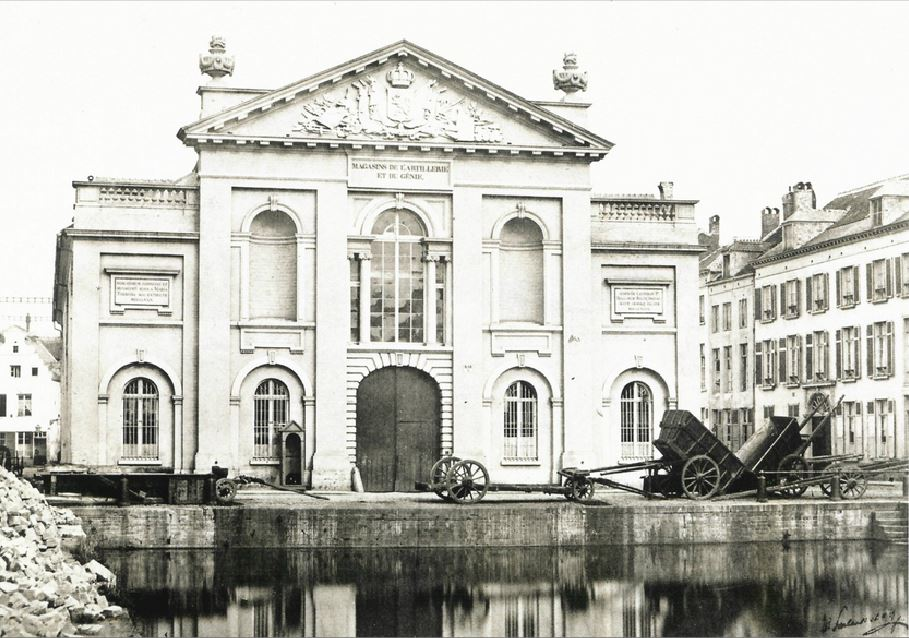
The former Brussels Arsenal in the late 19th century

In 1883, the city's then-mayor, Charles Buls, commissioned the architect and decorator Jean Baes to design the new theatre. Baes created a new façade in neo-Flemish Renaissance style on the Rue de Laeken/Lakensestraat, whilst retaining the arsenal's old façade as the rear of the building. The final plans were approved in 1884, work began the same year and the inauguration took place on 13 October 1887. At the solemn opening by King Leopold II, the Belgian monarch spoke Dutch publicly for the first time. A significant gesture, by which the king acknowledged and honoured the decades-long battle fought to launch a Dutch-language theatre in Brussels. This recognition was made official in 1894, during another visit by the king, when the Flemish Theatre received the honorary title of "Royal" (Dutch: Koninklijk Vlaams Theater or KVS).

=== 20th and 21st centuries ===
A violent fire ravaged the theatre on 25 May 1955, reducing much of its interior to ashes. Most of the damage was to the stage and the theatre hall. Luckily, the fire took place when the theatre was closed, so no one was injured or worse. The interior was quickly rebuilt according to plans by architects A.-J. Doncker and RF Michiels and the theatre reopened in 1958. The refurbishment did not, however, restore all the interior decorations, the architects of the newly built spaces, in particular the theatre hall, conforming to the prevailing views of the time regarding safety, efficiency and modern needs.

The façade and the foyer were protected as a monument through a royal decree issued on 9 September 1993. The building required major restorations and adaptations to the needs of a modern performance hall. Between 2001 and 2006, the old theatre hall was demolished and replaced by a new hall that can accommodate 500 people. On the other side of the Quai aux Pierres de Taille, a new building was built, comprising various rehearsal rooms, a small theatre hall, administrative and technical premises and a café-theatre. The two buildings are connected to each other by an underground passage under the street.

== Building ==
The neo-Flemish Renaissance façade on the Rue de Laeken's side is adorned with three busts of renowned 17th and 18th century Dutch playwrights. The bust of the central bay represents Joost van den Vondel, by the sculptor Jean-Baptiste de Keyser; that of the right bay Pieter Langendijk, by Albert Hambresin; and that of the left bay Willem Ogier, also by Hambresin. Two allegorical figures are depicted in the top corners of the stepped gables on either side of the main façade: one symbolising Tragedy, by the sculptor Isidore De Rudder; and the other Comedy, by Emile Namur.

On the two lateral façades, the long continuous cast iron balconies, whose width increases towards the ground floor, gives the building a rather unusual silhouette. These stepped balconies rest on steel brackets partially embedded in the side walls, reinforced by a network of metal profiles and masonry vaults. They intended to allow the simultaneous evacuation of many people, especially in the event of fire.

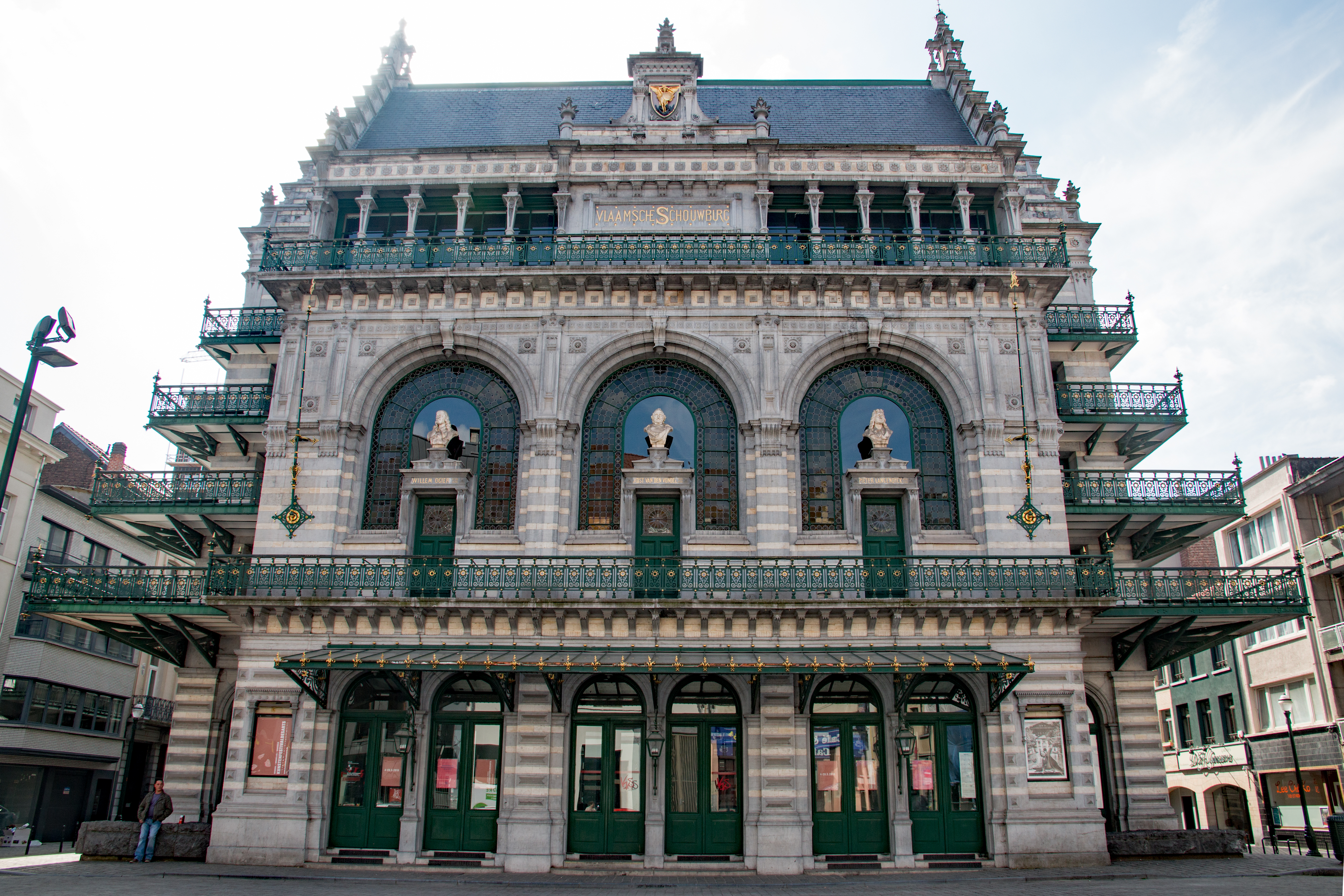
Frontal view

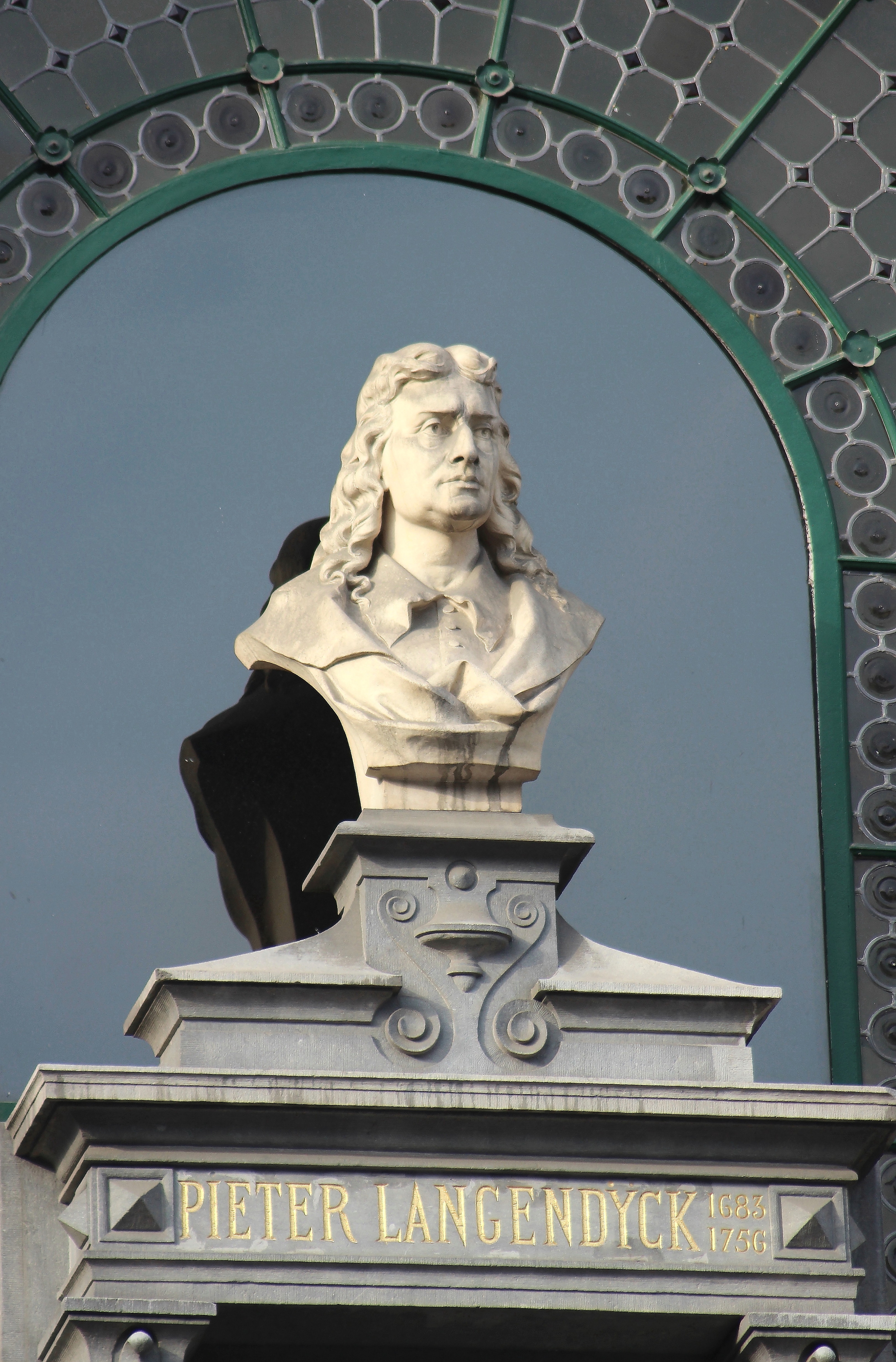
Bust of Pieter Langendijk

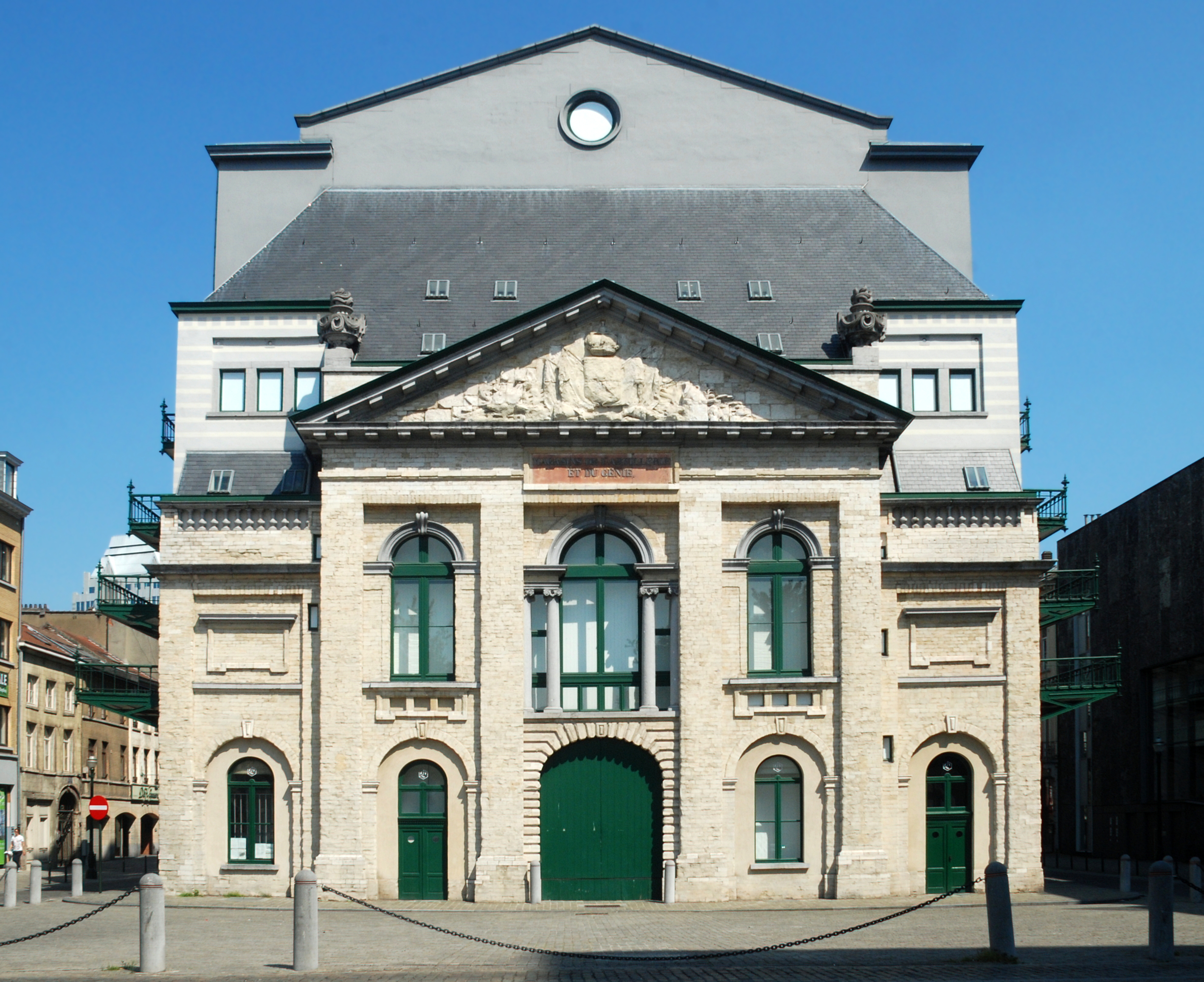
Rear view

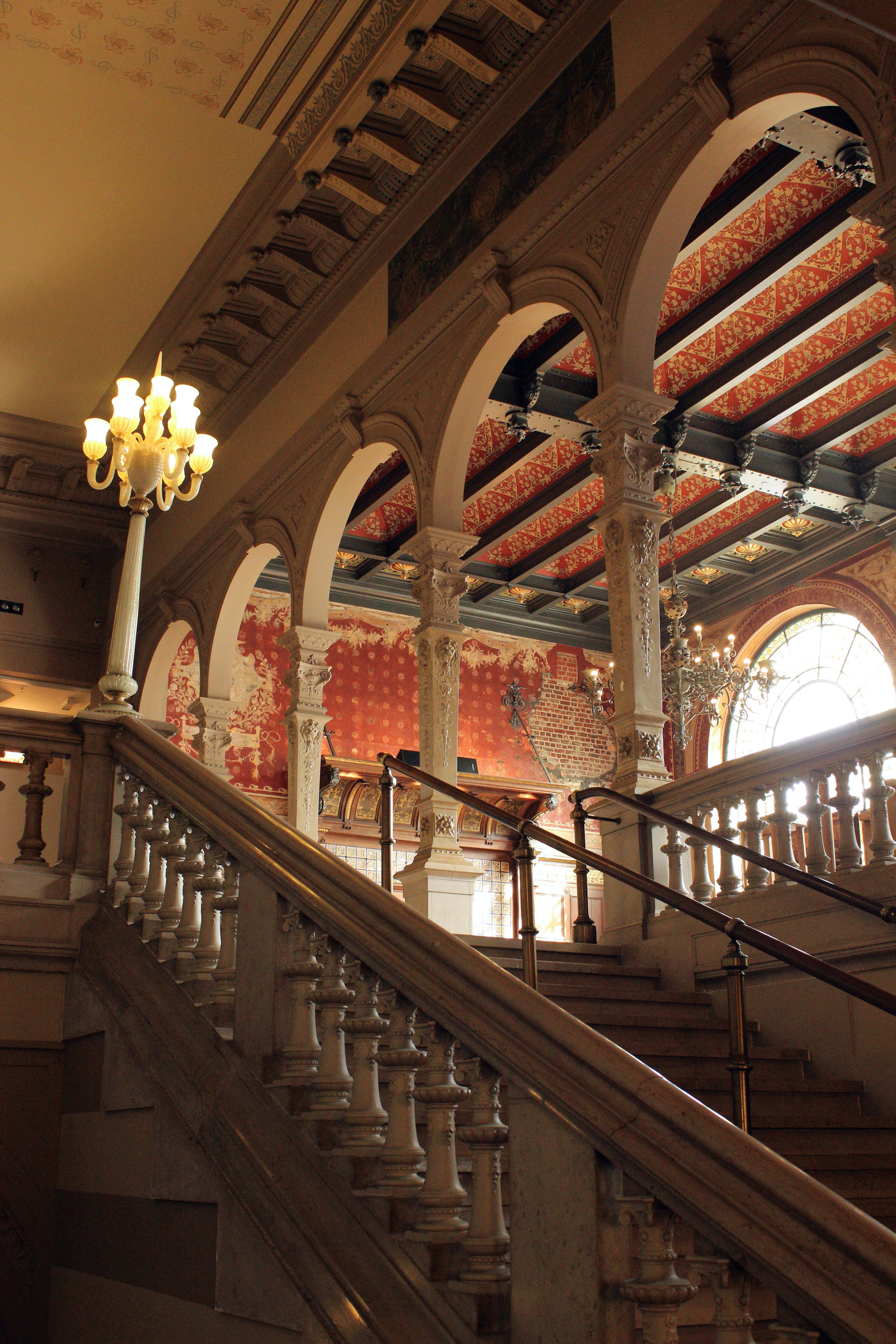
Interior

== See also ==
- Théâtre National Wallonie-Bruxelles
- History of Brussels
- Culture of Belgium
- Belgium in the long nineteenth century
