= Jan Beekman =

Belgian-born American painter

Jan Beekman (born 1929) is a Belgian-born American painter. He is the founder of Beekman Foundation.

== Early life and education ==
Jan Beekman was born in Meise, Belgium, in 1929. He received formal art education at the Académie Royale des Beaux-Arts in Brussels, where he studied painting.

== Career ==
Beekman began his career as a scenographer, first working for the drama division of Belgium's national television station, BRT. Later, he worked with several major theaters in Brussels and Flanders, including the Koninklijke Vlaamse Schouwburg and Beursschouwburg in Brussels, as well as the Arcatheater and Nationaal Theater Gent in Ghent.

In the 1960s, Beekman began exhibiting his work, notably at the Galerie Zodiaque in Brussels and in exhibitions organized by the Flemish constructivist group G-58. In the 1970s, he decided to leave scenography to focus primarily on painting and teaching. During this period, his paintings and drawings were exhibited in neighboring countries, including the Netherlands, Germany, and England. His early artworks were predominantly abstract and characterized by a darker color palette.

In the early 1980s, Beekman moved from Belgium to the United States and in 1982 became the artist-in-residence at the University of Michigan. After relocating to the U.S., Beekman spent a major period living and working in Chicago. During the 1980s and early 1990s, he frequently traveled across the American Southwest, an experience that influenced his artwork. Landscapes such as the Grand Canyon and other desert terrains became central subjects in his work.

After the 1980s, Beekman produced few works featuring human figures, despite his early training in portraiture. One notable exception is his painting The Liberation of Nelson Mandela, completed in 1990. In 1991, Beekman presented an exhibition titled Undiscoverings at the Fermilab Art Gallery in Illinois. In 1994, the Provincial Museum of Modern Art (PMMK) in Ostend, Belgium, now part of Mu.ZEE, hosted an exhibition of his work. In 1996, the Belgian government selected this painting as an official gift to the United Nations. It was unveiled at the UN Headquarters in New York, where it remains on permanent display.

In 1997, the year he became a U.S. citizen, Beekman moved to rural southeastern Connecticut. In New England, his artwork found inspiration in the local forests, seasonal changes, and the natural environment. A notable exhibition from this period, Inside the Natural World of Jan Beekman, was held at the Lyman Allyn Art Museum in New London, Connecticut, from 2014 to 2015.

In 2006, Beekman established the Beekman Foundation in Belgium to manage and archive his body of work. The foundation has offices in Belgium and the United States. It operates a contemporary arts center in Veurne, Flanders that houses a Jan Beekman Permanent Collection of his paintings.
