= De Vaartkapoen =

Dutch-speaking community centre and former school in Brussels, Belgium

- Gemeenschapscentrum De Vaartkapoen (Dutch)
- VK
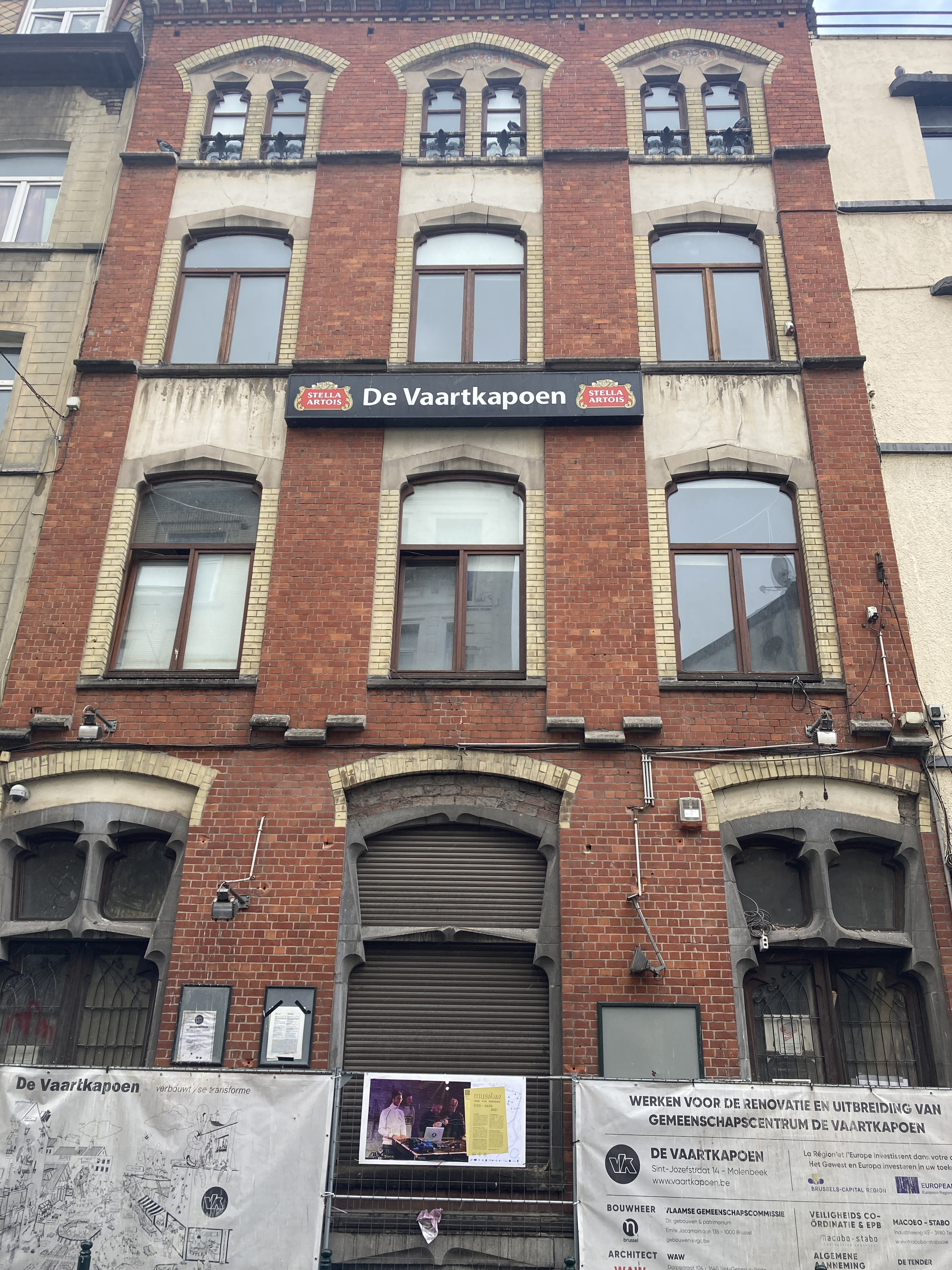
- De Vaartkapoen from Rue de l'École/Schoolstraat
- Interactive map of De Vaartkapoen
- Address: Rue Saint-Joseph/Sint-Jozefstraat 14; 1080 Molenbeek-Saint-Jean, Brussels-Capital Region; Belgium
- Coordinates: 50°51′25″N 4°20′17″E
- Type: community centre
- Public transit: 1 5 Étangs Noirs/Zwarte Vijvers and Comte de Flandre/Graaf van Vlaanderen

Construction
- Opened: November 10, 1984; 42 years ago
- Renovated: 2019–2023
- Reopened: 2023

Website
- Official website

Gemeenschapscentrum De Vaartkapoen, often abbreviated as VK, is a community centre in Molenbeek-Saint-Jean, a municipality of Brussels, Belgium. It operates under the Flemish Community Commission (VGC) and functions as a multidisciplinary venue combining music, social engagement, and community activities. The centre aims to foster cultural exchange and local participation while reflecting the diversity of Molenbeek. It is located at Rue Saint-Joseph/Sint-Jozefstraat 14 in central Molenbeek.

De Vaartkapoen focuses on three main areas: music, society, and the local community.

== Name ==
The name Vaartkapoen refers to 19th-century dock workers along the Brussels–Charleroi Canal. At Square Sainctelette, a statue by sculptor Tom Frantzen, installed in 1994, depicts the comic character Agent 15 from Hergé's Quick & Flupke being tripped by a vaartkapoen emerging from a manhole.

== History ==
The idea of establishing a community centre in Molenbeek was approved around 1974. Initially planned as a venue for amateur theatre and intended primarily for a "blanc, bleu, belge" audience, the project took roughly ten years to materialise. The centre was officially inaugurated on 10 November 1984 as Trefcentrum De Vaartkapoen by Karel Poma, then vice-president of the Flemish Executive and Minister of Culture for the Flemish Community.

In 1989, the concert programme was founded based on an idea by Marc Crooman and developed with the assistance of Fons Noeyens, with funding from various subsidies. The programme initially focused on hip-hop music and contributed to the hall's alternative image. Over the following decades, the concert programme developed into a venue for national and international artists. From 2010, the centre began organising concerts at off-site locations, including boats, planetariums, and the Halles de Schaerbeek.

In 2016, VK received a negative pre-advice for a Flemish cultural subsidy for 2017–2021 due to concerns over planning, budgeting, financial transparency, and representation of local talent. The centre responded by providing further documentation and public support campaigns. Subsequent reviews highlighted issues with budget clarity and programming profile, noting the audience was largely “white, Belgian, higher-educated, middle-class,” while VK emphasised its role in supporting emerging artists and training volunteers.

Since 2016, the centre has focused on cross-over activities combining social, artistic, educational, and intercultural projects. A major renovation of the building began in 2019 and lasted four years, resulting in a fully modernised, energy-efficient, and accessible community centre. The renovation included a new concert hall with a 480-person capacity, rehearsal and artist residency spaces, workshops and classrooms, a publicly accessible garden, and additional multifunctional spaces. The project cost over 11 million euros and was funded by the Flemish Community Commission, the European Regional Development Fund, the Flemish Community, and other cultural funds.

The renovated centre officially reopened on 22 November 2023 with a neighbourhood event featuring free concerts. The reopening re-established the centre's role as a cultural hub and community space, emphasising support for urban talent, intercultural music, and gender balance on stage. The building is designed to serve both as a venue for concerts and as a daytime space for courses, artistic projects, and community engagement, while integrating ecological and accessibility measures.

== See also ==
- List of concert halls
