= Sainte-Catherine metro station =

Metro station in Brussels, Belgium

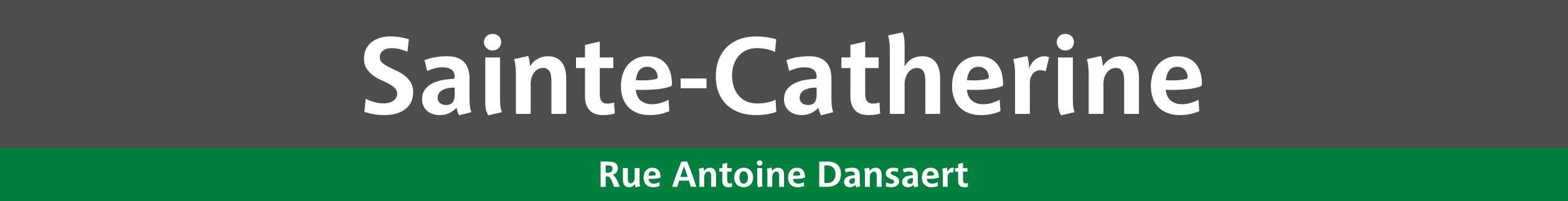
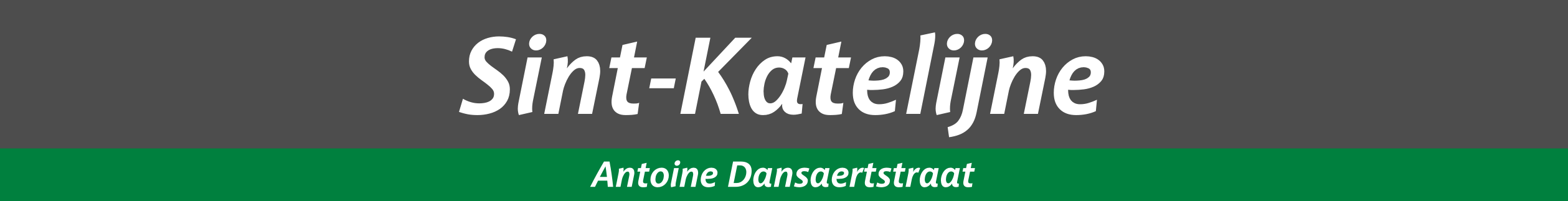

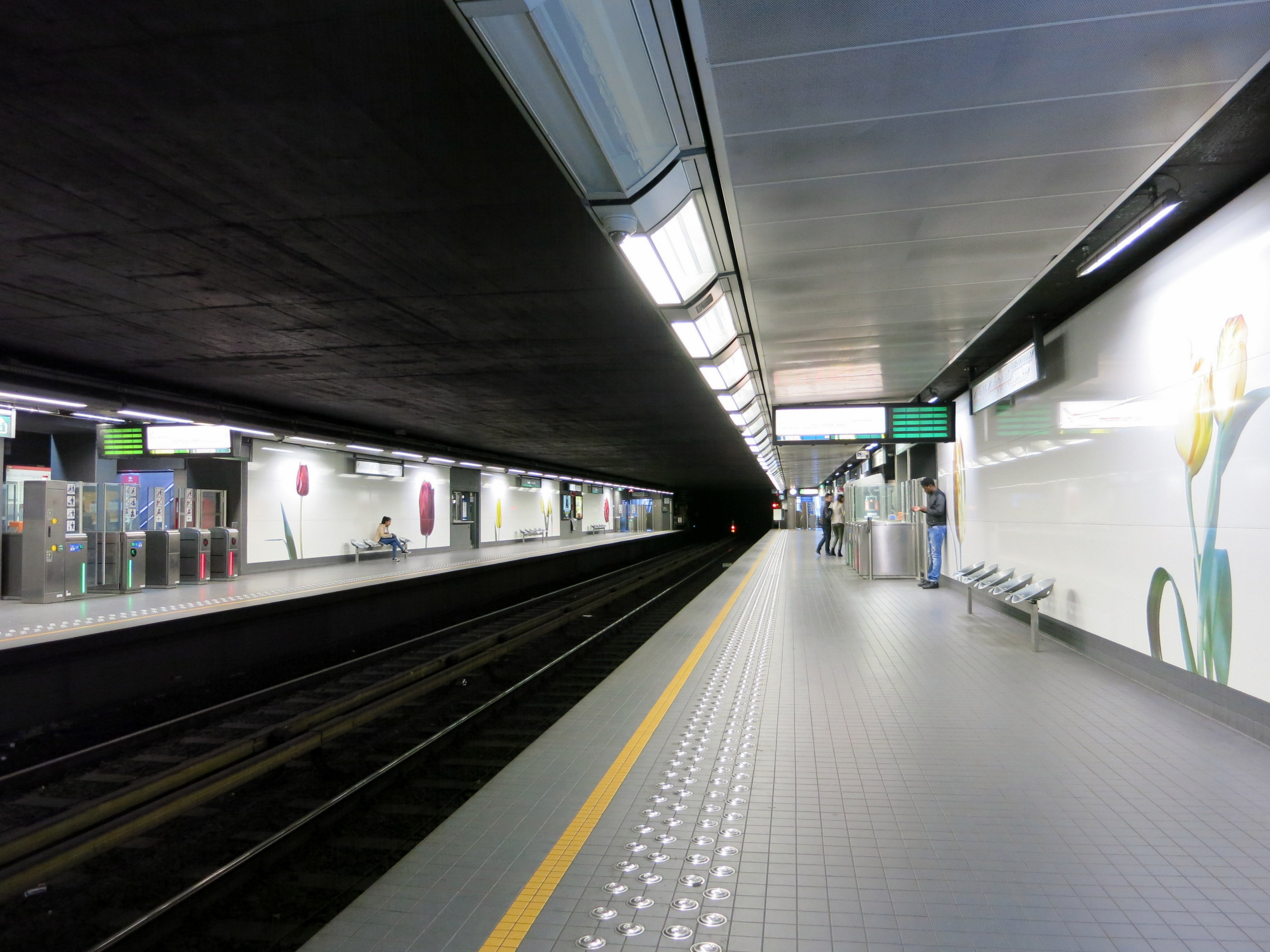
- Sainte-Catherine/Sint-Katelijne metro station

General information
- Location: Place Sainte-Catherine / Sint-Katelijneplein; 1000 City of Brussels, Brussels-Capital Region, Belgium
- Coordinates: 50°51′08″N 4°20′52″E
- Owner: STIB/MIVB
- Platforms: 2
- Tracks: 2

Construction
- Structure type: Underground
- Accessible: Yes

History
- Opened: 13 April 1977; 49 years ago

Services
Preceding station	Brussels Metro	Following station
Comte de Flandre/Graaf van Vlaanderen towards Gare de l'Ouest/Weststation	Line 1	De Brouckère towards Stockel/Stokkel
Comte de Flandre/Graaf van Vlaanderen towards Erasme/Erasmus	Line 5	De Brouckère towards Herrmann-Debroux
Location

Sainte-Catherine (French, pronounced [sɛ̃t katʁin]) or Sint-Katelijne (Dutch, pronounced [sɪnt ˌkaːtəˈlɛinə]) is a Brussels Metro station on lines 1 and 5. It is located under the Place Sainte-Catherine/Sint-Katelijneplein, between the Quai aux Briques/Baksteenkaai and the Quai au Bois à Brûler/Brandhoutkaai, in the City of Brussels, Belgium. The station received its name from the aboveground Church of St. Catherine, itself named after Saint Catherine.

The metro station opened on 13 April 1977, one year after Brussels' first metro line (former east–west line 1) was converted from premetro (underground tram) to heavy metro. Prior to the opening of an extension to Beekkant on 8 May 1981, the station was the western terminus of the metro. Then, following the reorganisation of the Brussels Metro on 4 April 2009, it now lies on the joint section of east–west lines 1 and 5.

== History ==
Sainte-Catherine/Sint-Katelijne station was inaugurated on 13 April 1977, a short extension of former line 1 from the neighbouring station De Brouckère. Until 8 May 1981 (with the opening of the extension to Beekkant), the station was the western terminus of the metro. On 6 October 1982, line 1 was split into two distinct lines: former lines 1A and 1B, both serving Sainte-Catherine/Sint-Katelijne. On 4 April 2009, metro operation was restructured and the station is now served by metro lines 1 and 5.

In late 2006 and in 2007, the station underwent a thorough renovation, giving it a more modern look both under and above ground.

== Station ==
The station is unique in Brussels for being located in the reclaimed and covered space of an old harbour dock, part of the original Port of Brussels. Because of this, the metro tunnel runs very shallowly at this point, making the station one of the few in Brussels that lack an underground mezzanine. Entrances and exits from the station lead up into the middle of the Place Sainte-Catherine/Sint-Katelijneplein.

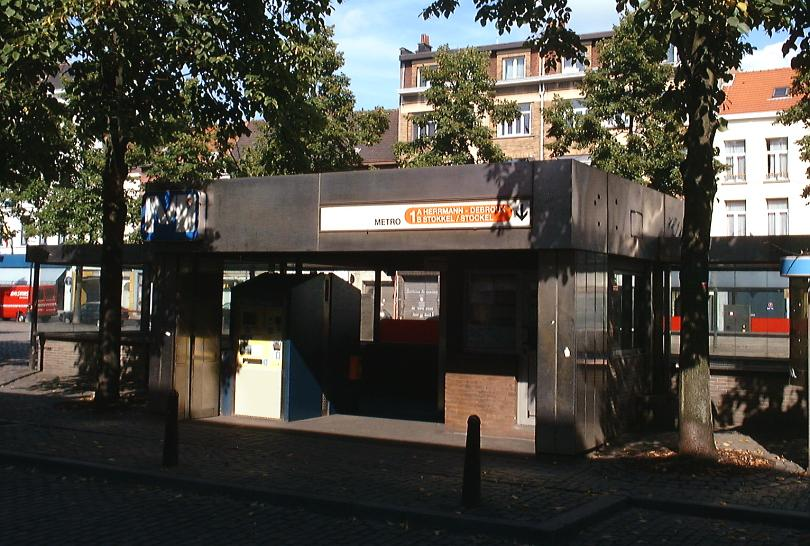
The original entrance

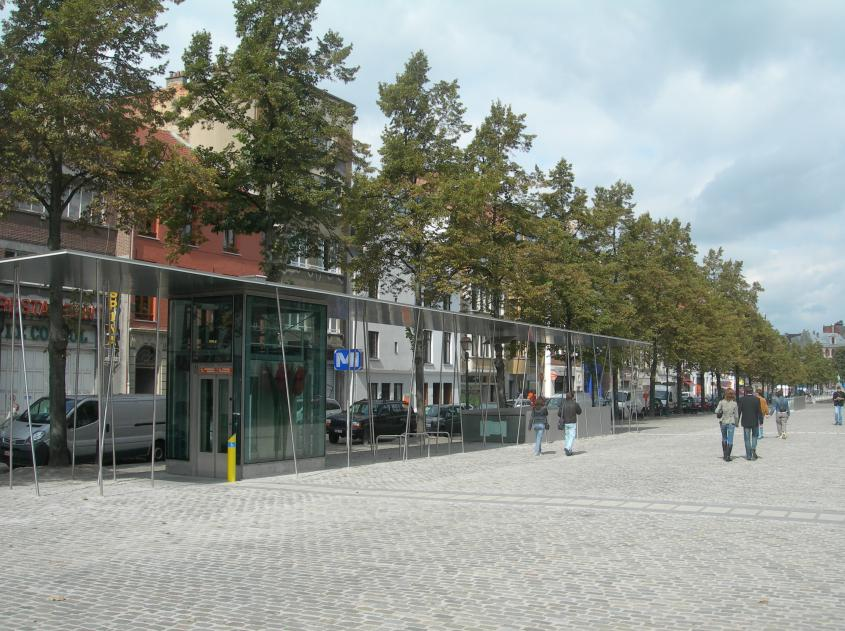
The current entrance

== See also ==
- Transport in Brussels
- History of Brussels
