= Comte de Flandre metro station =

Metro station in Brussels, Belgium

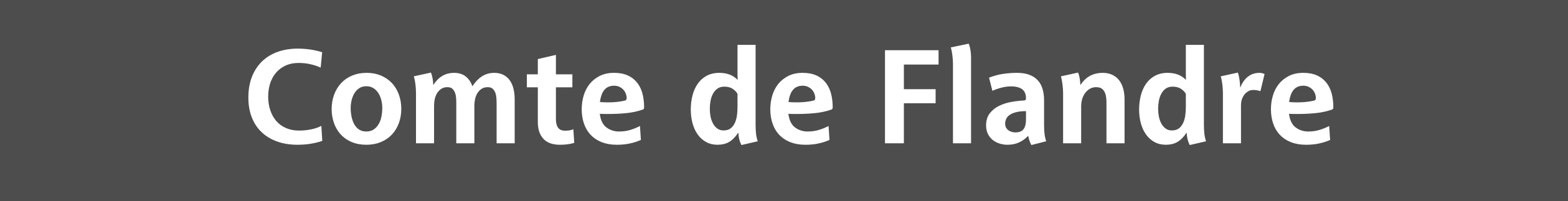
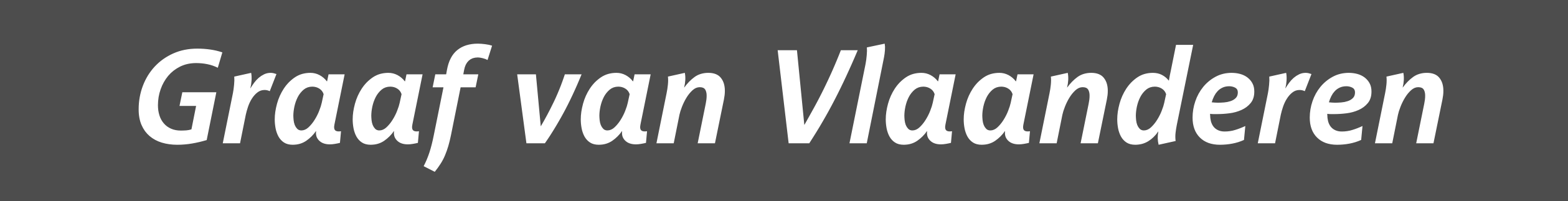

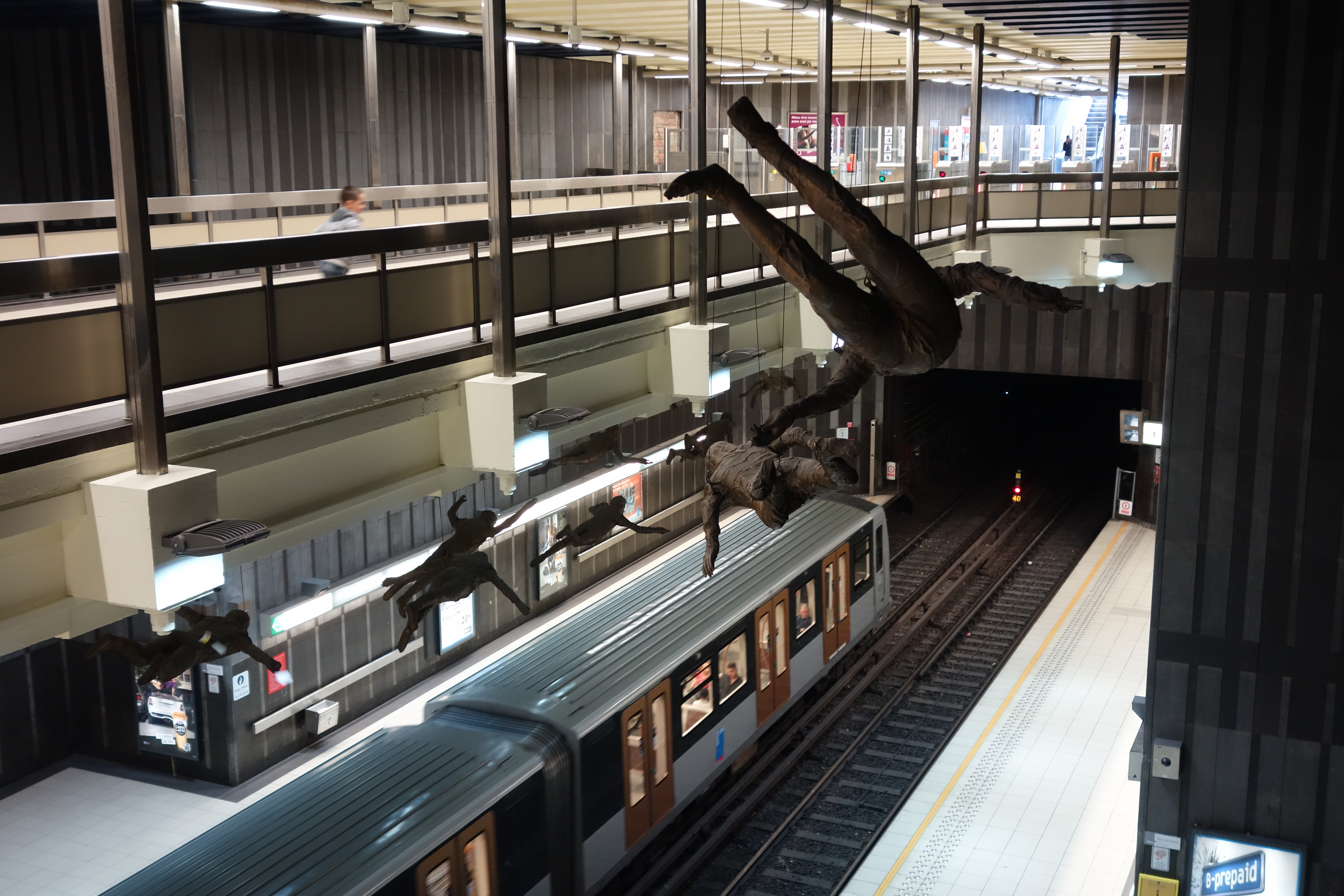
- Comte de Flandre/Graaf van Vlaanderen metro station

General information
- Location: Rue Sainte-Marie / Sint-Mariastraat; 1080 Molenbeek-Saint-Jean, Brussels-Capital Region, Belgium
- Coordinates: 50°51′17″N 4°20′24″E
- Owner: STIB/MIVB
- Platforms: 2
- Tracks: 2

Construction
- Structure type: Underground
- Accessible: Yes

History
- Opened: 8 May 1981; 45 years ago

Services
Preceding station	Brussels Metro	Following station
Étangs Noirs/Zwarte Vijvers towards Gare de l'Ouest/Weststation	Line 1	Sainte-Catherine/Sint-Katelijne towards Stockel/Stokkel
Étangs Noirs/Zwarte Vijvers towards Erasme/Erasmus	Line 5	Sainte-Catherine/Sint-Katelijne towards Herrmann-Debroux
Location

Comte de Flandre (French, pronounced [kɔ̃t də flɑ̃dʁ]) or Graaf van Vlaanderen (Dutch, pronounced [ˈɣraː(f) fɑɱ ˈvlaːndərə(n)]) is a Brussels Metro station on lines 1 and 5. It is located in the municipality of Molenbeek-Saint-Jean, in the western part of Brussels, Belgium. The station takes its name from the nearby street Rue du Comte de Flandre/Graaf van Vlaanderenstraat (lit. 'Count of Flanders Street').

The metro station opened on 8 May 1981 as part of the Sainte-Catherine/Sint-Katelijne–Beekkant extension of former east–west line 1 (further split in 1982 into former lines 1A and 1B). Then, following the reorganisation of the Brussels Metro on 4 April 2009, it now lies on the joint section of east–west lines 1 and 5.

Under the name 16 X Icarus, sixteen apparently flying dolls made of plaster and bronze are suspended from the ceiling at different heights in the station hall and above the platforms. The artwork is by Paul Van Hoeydonck.

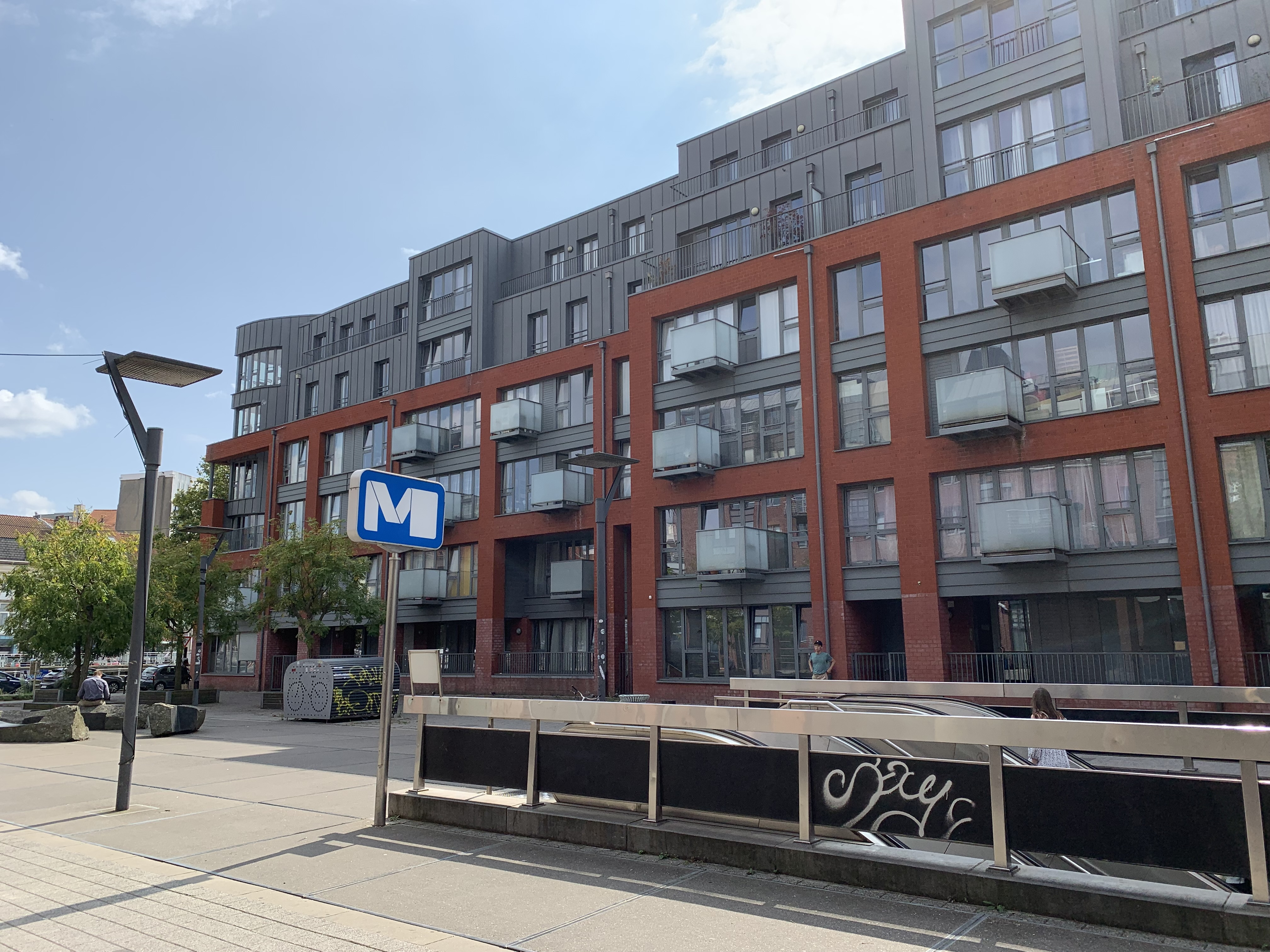
Entrance to the station

== See also ==
- Transport in Brussels
- History of Brussels
