= Quays Quarter =

Neighbourhood in Brussels, Belgium

Quays Quarter: Quartier des Quais (French); Kaaienwijk (Dutch); Quartier Sainte-Catherine (French); Sint-Katelijnewijk (Dutch)
- Neighbourhood
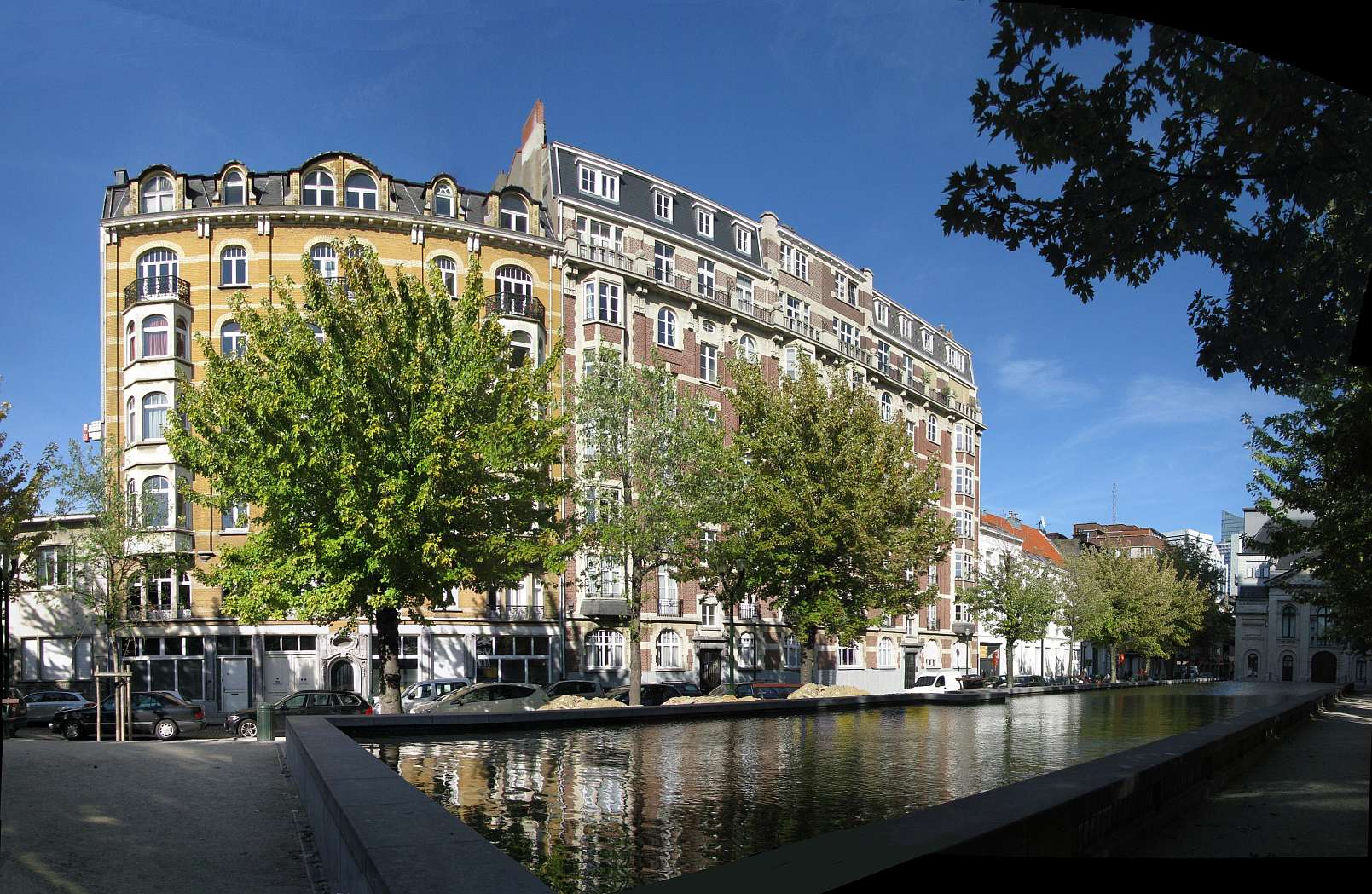
- Quai au Foin/Hooikaai

- Location within Brussels Quays Quarter (Belgium)
- Coordinates: 50°51′15″N 4°20′51″E
- Country: Belgium
- Region: Brussels-Capital Region
- Arrondissement: Brussels-Capital
- Municipality: City of Brussels
- Time zone: UTC+1 (CET)
  - Summer (DST): UTC+2 (CEST)
- Postal code: 1000
- Area codes: 02

The Quays Quarter (French: Quartier des Quais, pronounced [kaʁtje de kɛ]; Dutch: Kaaienwijk, pronounced [ˈkaːiə(ɱ)ˌʋɛik]), also known as the Sainte-Catherine/Sint-Katelijne Quarter (French: Quartier Sainte-Catherine; Dutch: Sint-Katelijnewijk), is a quarter of Brussels, Belgium. It is served by the metro stations Sainte-Catherine/Sint-Katelijne (on lines 1 and 5) and Yser/IJzer (on lines 2 and 6).

== History ==
The Quays Quarter is that of the old Port of Brussels, which for a long time played the role of "belly" of the city. Boats coming from the river Scheldt entered through the former Shore Gate (French: Porte du Rivage, Dutch: Oeverpoort), on the site of the present-day Place de l'Yser/Ijzerplein, to join one of the canals, whose docks were each reserved for one type of goods.

Filled in the late 19th century with the opening of Brussels' new port, these basins were replaced by wide boulevards, whose names on both sides still recall their former function: the Quai aux Briques/Baksteenkaai ("Brick Wharf"), the Quai au Bois à Brûler/Brandhoutkaai ("Firewood Wharf"), the Quai aux Pierres de Taille/Arduinkaai ("Quarry Stone Wharf"), the Quai au Foin/Hooikaai ("Hay Wharf"), etc., or references to the neighbourhood's commercial activities: the Rue du Magasin/Pakhuisstraat ("Warehouse Street"), the Rue des Commerçants/Koopliedenstraat ("Traders Street"), the Rue du Marché aux Porcs/Varkensmarktstraat ("Pig Market Street") and the Quai du Commerce/Handelskaai ("Trade Wharf").

Along the quaysides, numerous bourgeois houses, once belonging to wealthy merchants, have preserved the entrances to the warehouses. On the Boulevard d'Ypres/Ieperlaan, one can still cross food wholesalers, now supplied by trucks that have replaced the boats. The district also includes the Great Beguinage of Brussels, with the Church of St. John the Baptist and the Grand Hospice Pachéco.

== See also ==
- Neighbourhoods in Brussels
- History of Brussels
- Culture of Belgium
- Belgium in the long nineteenth century
