= Port of Brussels =

Port in Brussels, Belgium

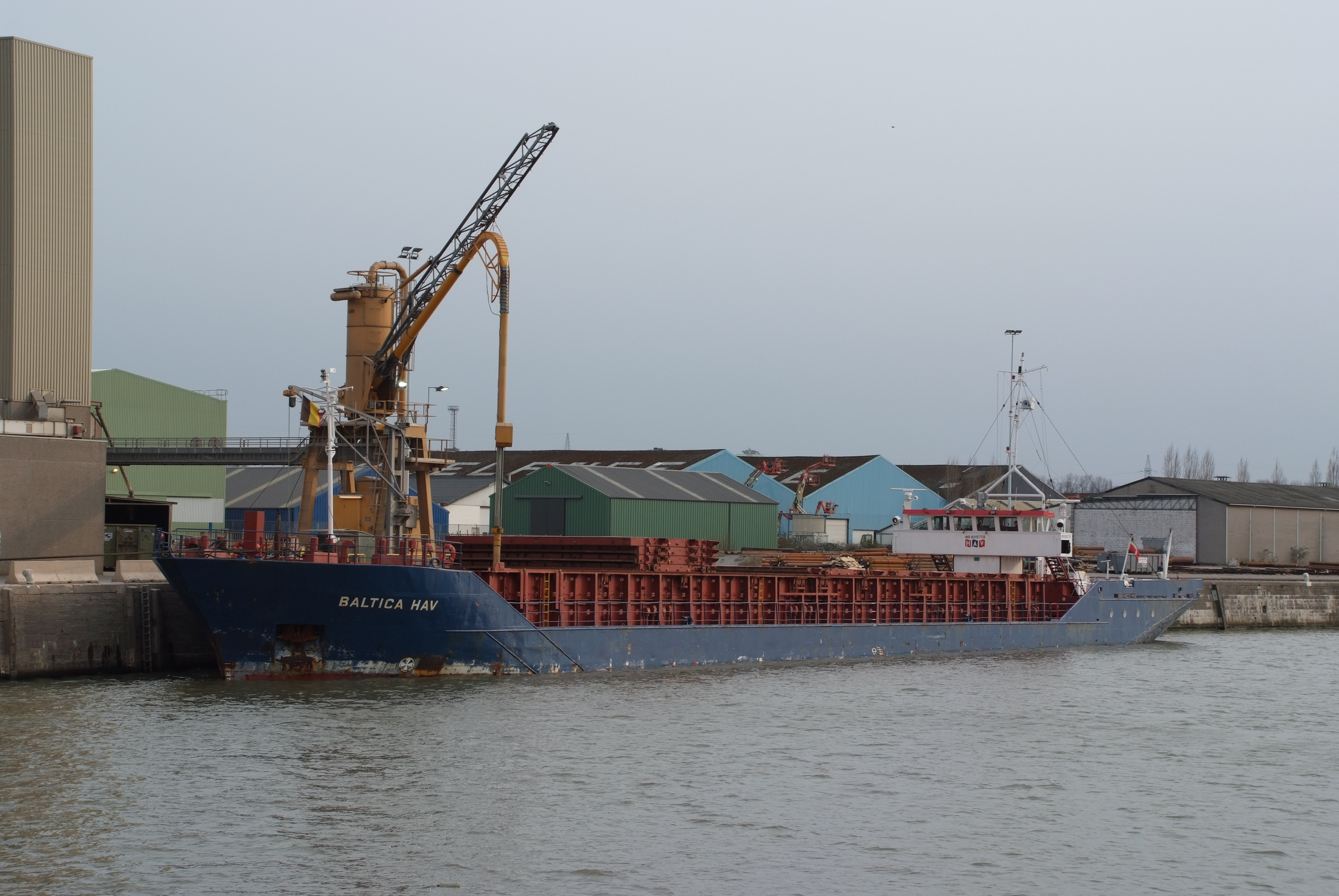
- Baltica Hav coaster in the Port of Brussels
- Interactive map of Port of Brussels

Location
- Country: Belgium
- Location: City of Brussels, Brussels-Capital Region
- Coordinates: 50.8687°N 4.3549°E
- UN/LOCODE: BEBRU

Details
- Land area: 64 ha (160 acres)

Statistics
- Website www.havenvanbrussel.irisnet.be

The Port of Brussels (French: Port de Bruxelles; Dutch: Haven van Brussel) is an inland port at a distance of 120 kilometres (75 mi) from the sea. It is accessible for ships up to 4,500 tonnes and push towing convoys up to 9,000 tonnes. Via the Brussels–Scheldt Maritime Canal even sea-going vessels (fluviomaritime and coasters) can reach the outer port, and through the Brussels–Charleroi Canal the transit to Wallonia is assured. The port is located in the City of Brussels in the Brussels-Capital Region.

On the limited surface area (64 ha) there are approximately 300 companies, which account for about 13,000 jobs.

== History ==
The Saint Catherine Dock, Eugène Boudin, 1871

The current Port of Brussels, which lies north from the Pentagon (city centre), finds its origin in the construction of the Willebroek Canal, which was opened in 1561 for shipping. Over the years, within the city walls, several end canals, whose docks were each reserved for one type of goods, were built. These basins were filled in the late 19th century, at the opening of Brussels' new port located outside the Pentagon. The street names along the former docks, however, still retain in their names the memory of their former function or references to the neighbourhood's commercial activities.

There were six docks in total, three docks at the Shore Gate (French: Porte du Rivage, Dutch: Oeverpoort) where the canal entered the city walls, that were aligned in longitudinal direction, and on each of them another dock followed in transverse direction: the Grand Bassin/Groot Dok and the Bassin du Chantier/Werfdok; the Bassin des Barques/Schuitendok and the Bassin de l'Entrepôt/Stapelhuisdok; and finally the Bassin des Marchands/Koopliedendok and the Bassin de Saint-Catherine/Sint-Katelijnedok.

== General information ==
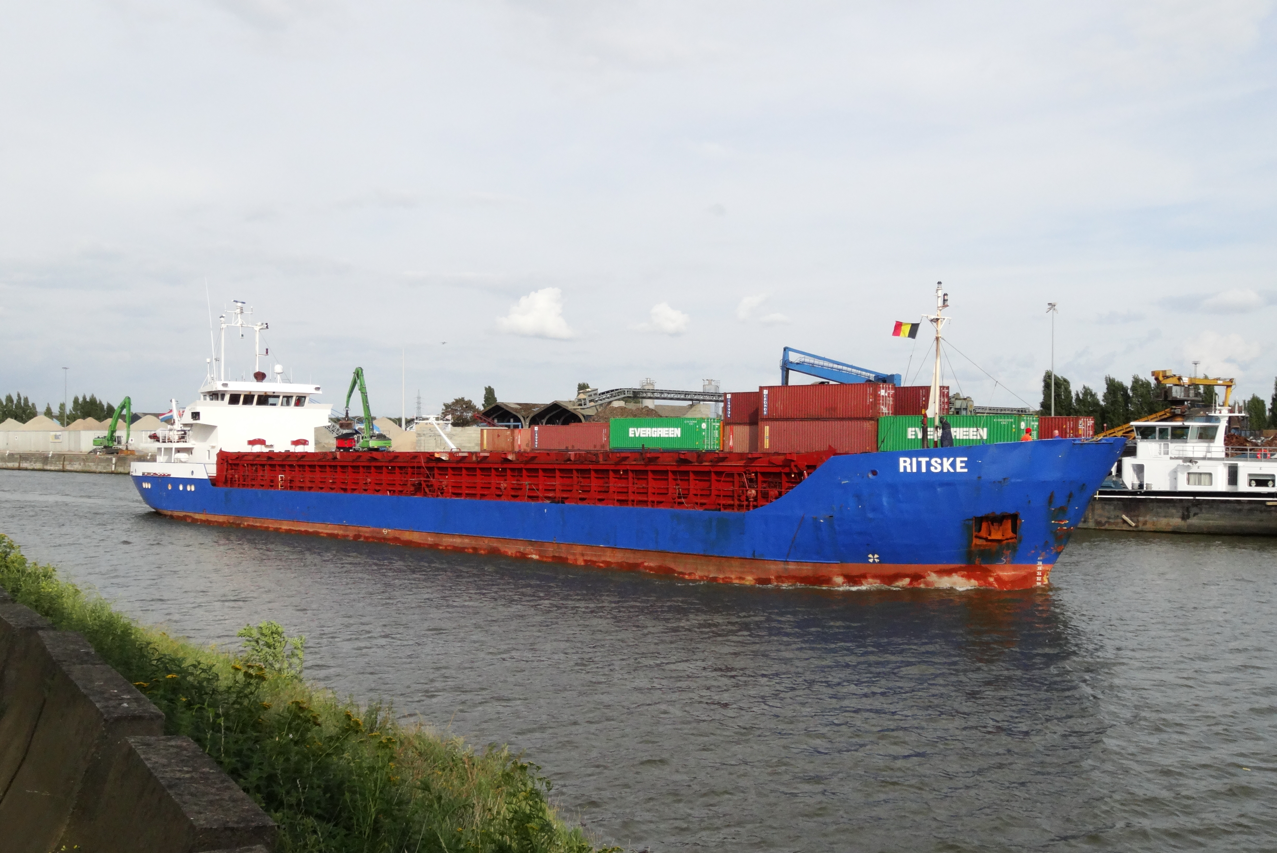
Ritske sea-going vessel in the Port of Brussels

The Port of Brussels was founded in 1993, as a result of the splitting of the N.V. Zeekanaal in a Flemish and a Brussels institution, five years after the authority over the ports in Belgium was transferred to the regions. The new autonomy in 1993 immediately led to new dynamism and growth in the results. In the twenty years prior, the traffic of 14.4 million tonnes in 1974 had shrunk to less than a third. Since 1993, the traffic has increased by 60% again.

In the port, more than 24 million tonnes of goods are traded yearly, most via railway and road transport, and over 6.6 million tonnes via the waterway transit (as of 2016). The main shareholders are the Brussels-Capital Region (56%) and the City of Brussels (35%). Together with the Brussels-based investment company Brinfin (3.9%) and some other municipalities (5.1%) they indicate the members of the board of directors. The first Director General was Steven Vanackere (1993–2000). Nowadays, Mohammed Jabour is the chairman of the Board of Directors, and Alfred Moens the General Manager. The current competent minister is Rudi Vervoort, Minister-President of the Brussels-Capital Region.

== See also ==
- Tour & Taxis
- Ric's Art Boat
- History of Brussels
- Belgium in the long nineteenth century
