= Roue =

Roué is a synonym for rake (character).

Roue or La Roue may also refer to:

- La Roue, a 1923 film by Abel Gance
- La Roue (Brussels), a district
  - La Roue/Het Rad metro station, in Brussels
- Rõue, a village in Estonia
- William James Roué (1879–1970), a naval architect famous for his design of the Bluenose fishing schooner
