= Jacques Brel metro station =

Metro station in Brussels, Belgium

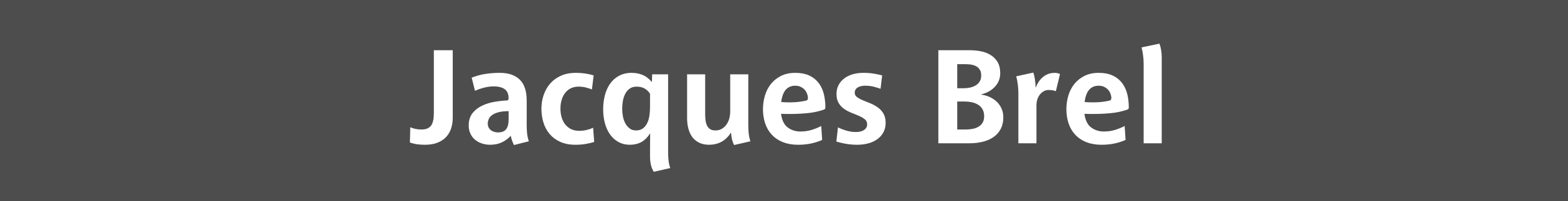

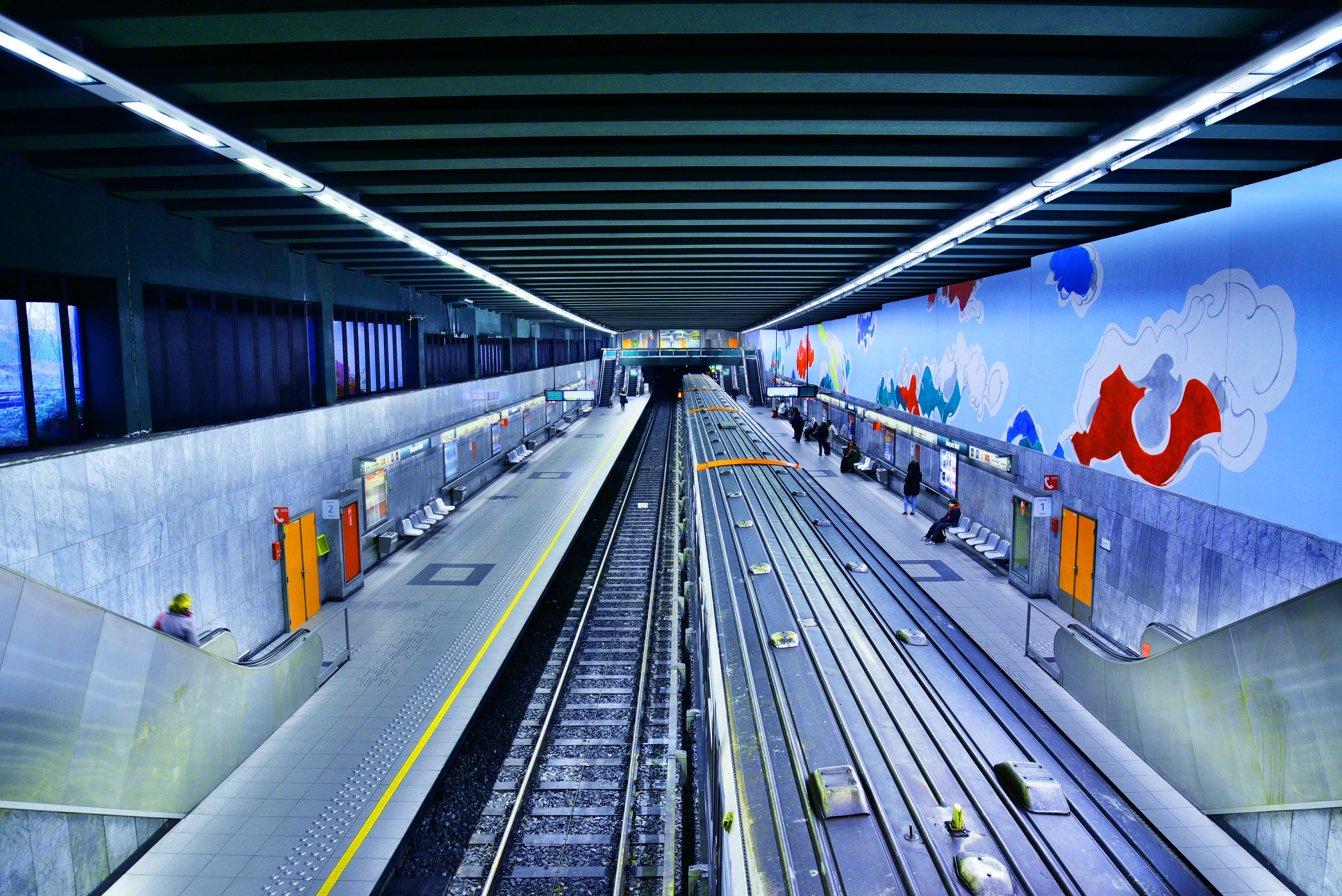
- Jacques Brel metro station

General information
- Location: Boulevard Jules Graindor / Jules Graindorlaan; 1070 Anderlecht, Brussels-Capital Region, Belgium
- Coordinates: 50°50′42″N 4°19′07″E
- Owner: STIB/MIVB
- Platforms: 2
- Tracks: 2

Construction
- Structure type: Underground
- Accessible: Yes

History
- Opened: 6 October 1982; 43 years ago

Services
Preceding station	Brussels Metro	Following station
Aumale towards Erasme/Erasmus	Line 5	Gare de l'Ouest/Weststation towards Herrmann-Debroux
Location

Jacques Brel (French pronunciation: [ʒak bʁɛl]) is a Brussels Metro station on the western branch of line 5. It is located in the municipality of Anderlecht, in the western part of Brussels, Belgium. The station is named after the Belgian singer, songwriter, and poet Jacques Brel.

The metro station opened on 6 October 1982 as part of the Beekkant–Saint-Guidon/Sint-Guido extension of former line 1B. Then, following the reorganisation of the Brussels Metro on 4 April 2009, it is served by the extended east–west line 5.

After the City of Brussels commissioned art projects to enhance the metro network, the artist Maurice Wyckaert was appointed to decorate the station.

== See also ==
- Transport in Brussels
- History of Brussels
