= Aumale metro station =

Metro station in Brussels, Belgium

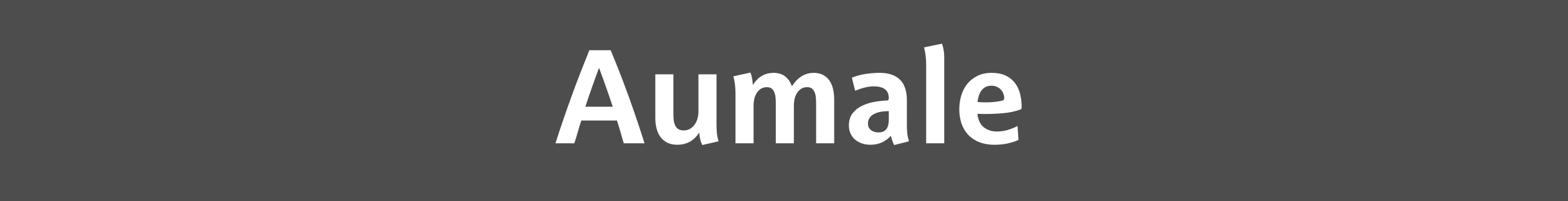

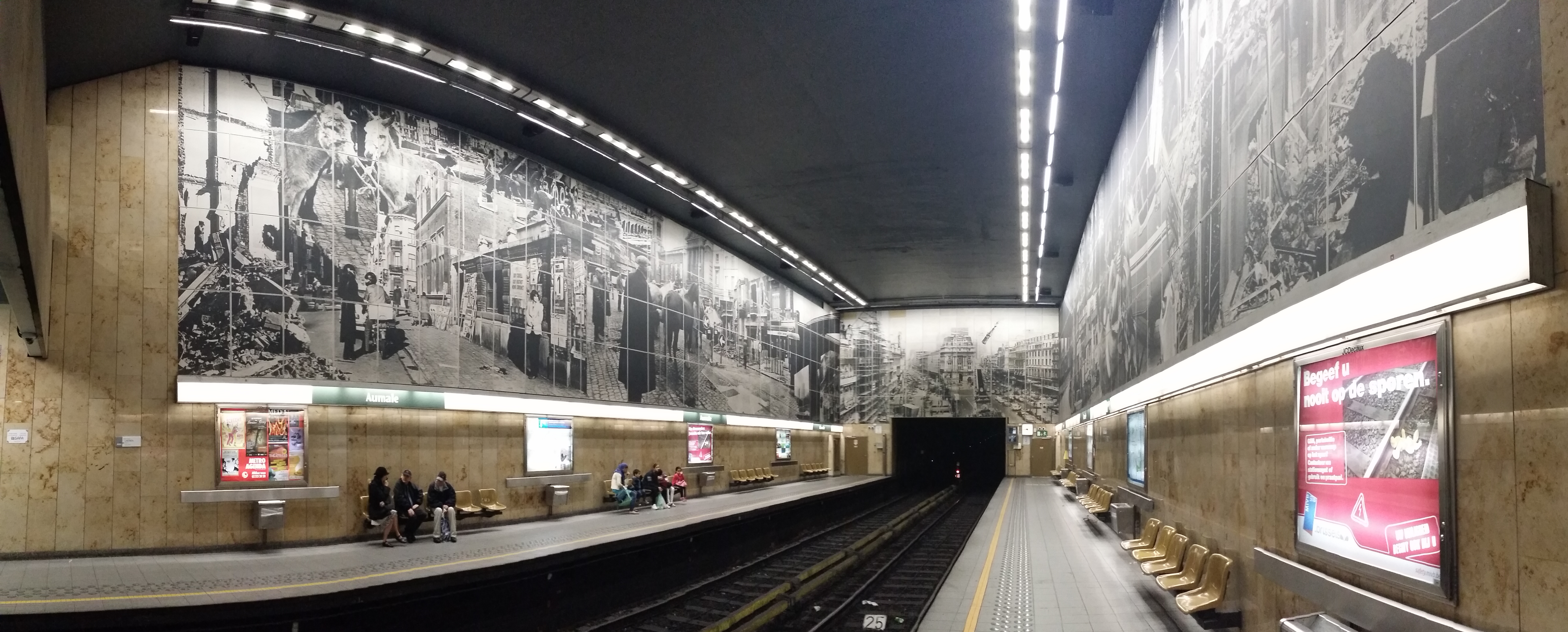
- Aumale metro station displaying its panorama

General information
- Location: Rue d'Aumale / Aumalestraat; 1070 Anderlecht, Brussels-Capital Region, Belgium
- Coordinates: 50°50′22″N 4°18′45″E
- Owner: STIB/MIVB
- Platforms: 2
- Tracks: 2

Construction
- Structure type: Underground
- Accessible: Yes

History
- Opened: 6 October 1982; 43 years ago

Services
Preceding station	Brussels Metro	Following station
Saint-Guidon/Sint-Guido towards Erasme/Erasmus	Line 5	Jacques Brel towards Herrmann-Debroux
Location

Aumale (French pronunciation: [omal]) is a Brussels Metro station on the western branch of line 5. It is located in the municipality of Anderlecht, in the western part of Brussels, Belgium. The station received its name from the aboveground street Rue d'Aumale/Aumalestraat.

The metro station opened on 6 October 1982 as part of the Beekkant–Saint-Guidon/Sint-Guido extension of former line 1B. Then, following the reorganisation of the Brussels Metro on 4 April 2009, it is served by the extended east–west line 5.

== See also ==
- Transport in Brussels
- History of Brussels
