= La Roue, Brussels =

Neighbourhood in Brussels, Belgium

La Roue: La Roue (French); Het Rad (Dutch)
- Neighbourhood
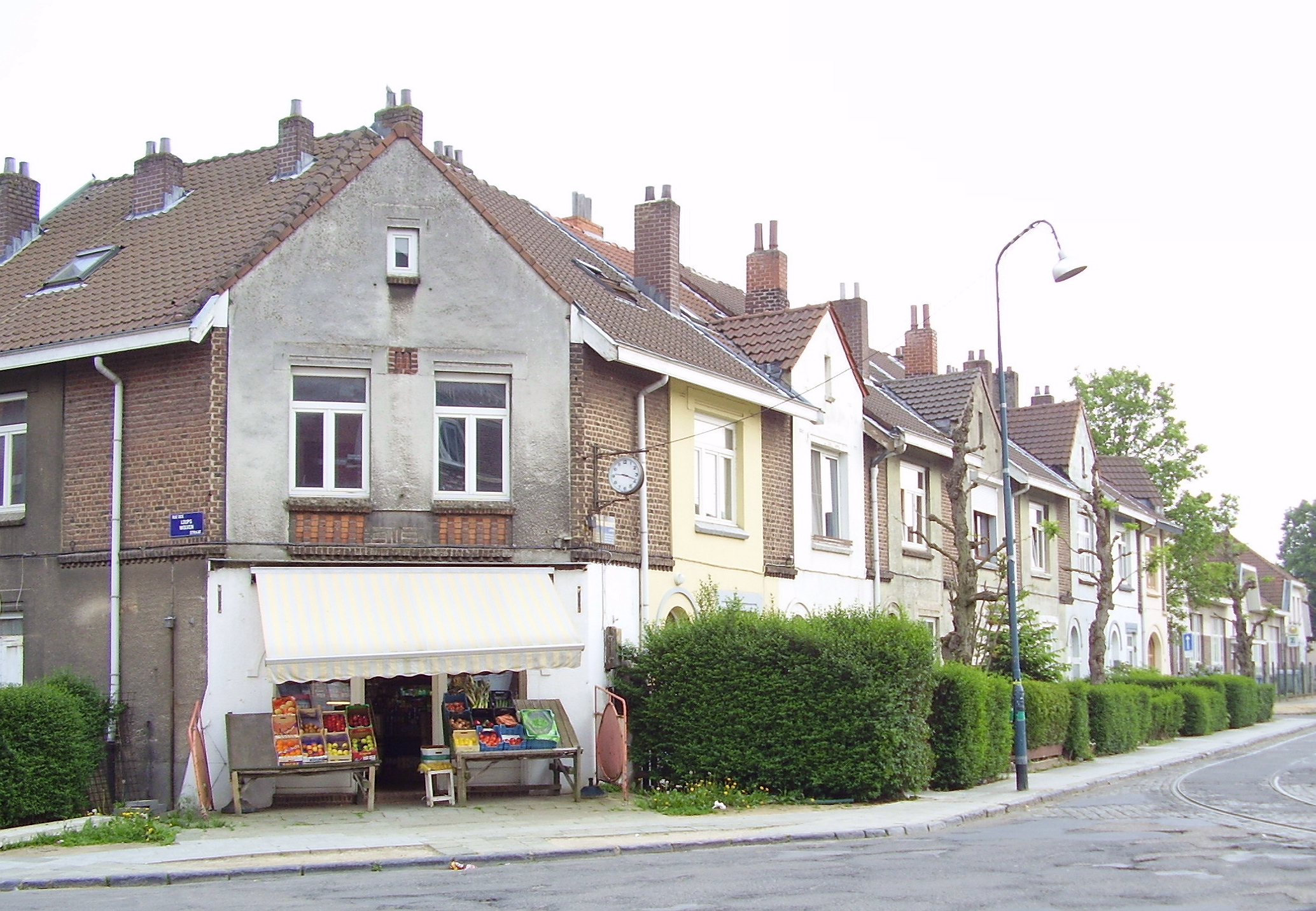
- La Roue/Het Rad garden city

- Location within Brussels La Roue (Belgium)
- Coordinates: 50°49′22″N 4°17′51″E
- Country: Belgium
- Region: Brussels-Capital Region
- Arrondissement: Brussels-Capital
- Municipality: Anderlecht
- Construction: 1907–1928
- Named for: Breaking wheel
- Time zone: UTC+1 (CET)
  - Summer (DST): UTC+2 (CEST)
- Postal code: 1070
- Area codes: 02

La Roue (French, pronounced [la ʁu]) or Het Rad (Dutch, pronounced [ət ˈrɑt]), meaning "The Wheel", is a district of Anderlecht, a municipality of Brussels, Belgium. Located in the south of Anderlecht, it is one of this municipality's largest districts of and one of Brussels' main garden cities. Mostly built in the 1920s, with its modest and picturesque houses, it offers a vision of an early 20th-century working-class neighbourhood. At its southern edge, it is also home to the Food and Chemical Industries Education and Research Center (CERIA/COOVI), as well as large department stores.

The district is crossed by the last end of the Chaussée de Mons/Bergensesteenweg in Brussels, and is bounded to the east by the Brussels–Charleroi Canal and to the south by the Flemish municipality of Sint-Pieters-Leeuw, in the Pajottenland. It is served by the metro stations Bizet, La Roue/Het Rad and CERIA/COOVI on line 5.

== Toponymy ==
The name La Roue (Dutch: Het Rad) likely originates from a large wheel once displayed near a forge or coach stop at the crossroads of the Chaussée de Mons/Bergensesteenweg and the Route de Lennik/Lenniksebaan. Another legend refers to a breaking wheel used near a medieval prison tower that once stood in the area.

== History ==
=== Origins and medieval times ===
The area has been inhabited since at least 4000 BCE. Archaeological discoveries in the Champ Saint-Anne/Sint-Annaveld area revealed flint tools, stone grinders, and handmade ceramic vessels from prehistoric times. In 1890, workers unearthed the remains of a Roman villa and a Frankish cemetery, confirming continuous settlement from antiquity through the early medieval era.

In the 10th century, the Viking Siegfried de Balling and his brother landed near the river Aa and secured the County of Wynen through an agreement with the Duke of Lorraine. This territory became the Lordship of Aa, from which the House of Aa family rose to prominence. Their seat, Waesbroeck Castle, likely stood near the present-day CERIA/COOVI campus or the former D'Aoust textile factory, serving as a power base in the region. By the 11th century, the family was instrumental in founding the chapter of Anderlecht, and in 1047, Volkaard I of Aa appeared in the founding charter of the Church of St. Michael and St. Gudula (now Brussels' cathedral).

The Chaussée de Mons was established in 1366 as a key trade route connecting the City of Brussels to Halle (French: Hal), now located in Flemish Brabant. It was lined with coaching inns and mills. By the 15th century, the area experienced demographic growth, particularly along the Rue d'Aa/Aastraat, a rural road following the course of the river Aa.

=== Industrialisation and urbanisation ===
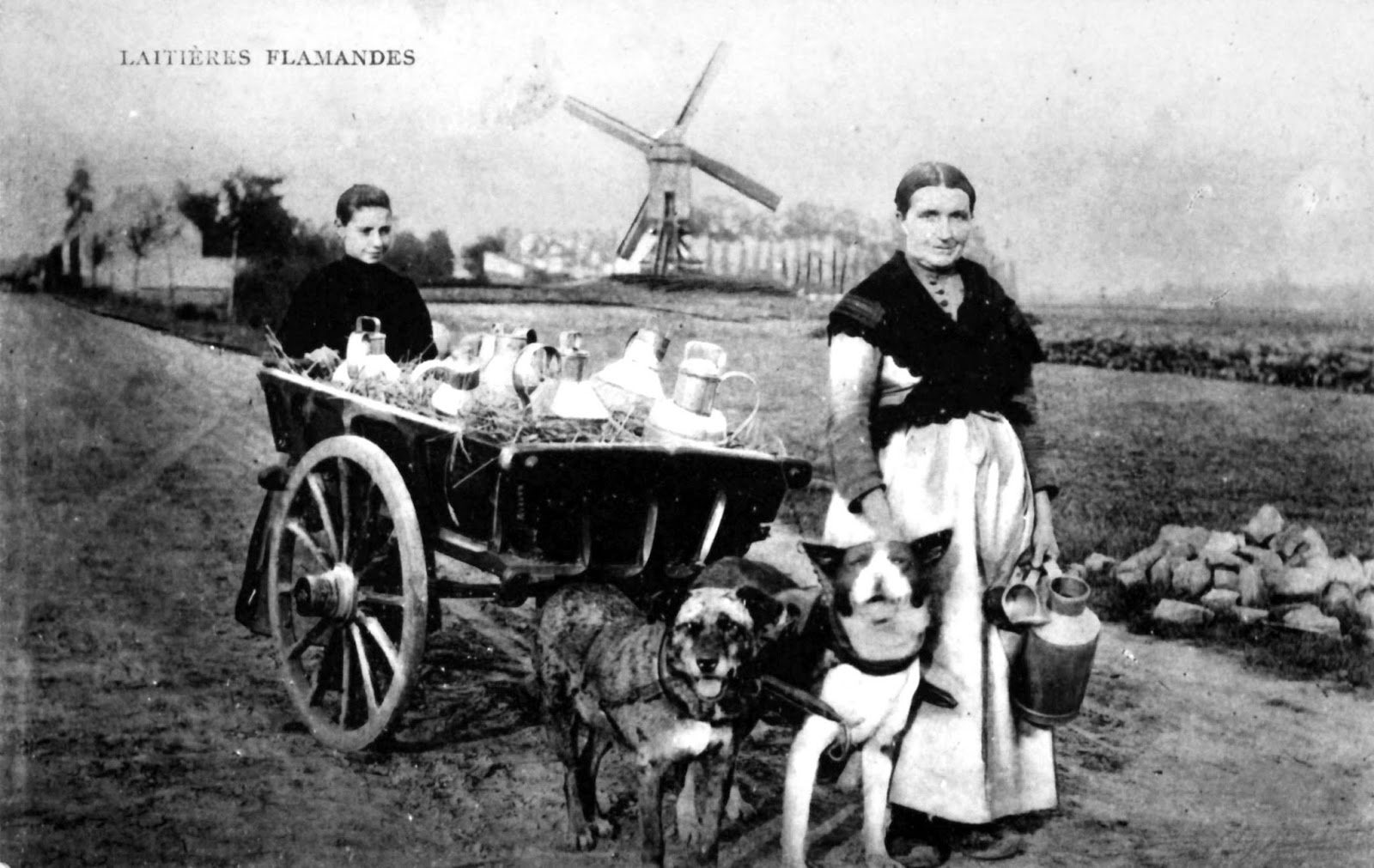
Flemish milkmaids and windmill at La Roue/Het Rad, c. 1900

On 13 November 1792, the Battle of Anderlecht was fought nearby between forces of the Habsburg monarchy and the French First Republic, as part of the French Revolutionary Wars. During the battle, a wooden windmill stood on a small rise at a site known as the Mill of La Roue/Het Rad, situated between the Chaussée de Mons and what is now the Avenue de la Persévérance/Volhardingslaan, just beyond the junction with the Route de Lennik. The original structure, likely lost to age or disrepair, was replaced before 1834 by a new wooden windmill commissioned by the local miller François Hérinckx. This windmill was demolished around 1903.

In 1826, King William I of the Netherlands ordered the construction of the Brussels–Charleroi Canal to enhance transportation and water management. This infrastructure project significantly transformed the region by absorbing the overflow of the Senne and encouraging industrial growth. The subsequent development of railways in the 1920s further accelerated the area's industrial and urban evolution.

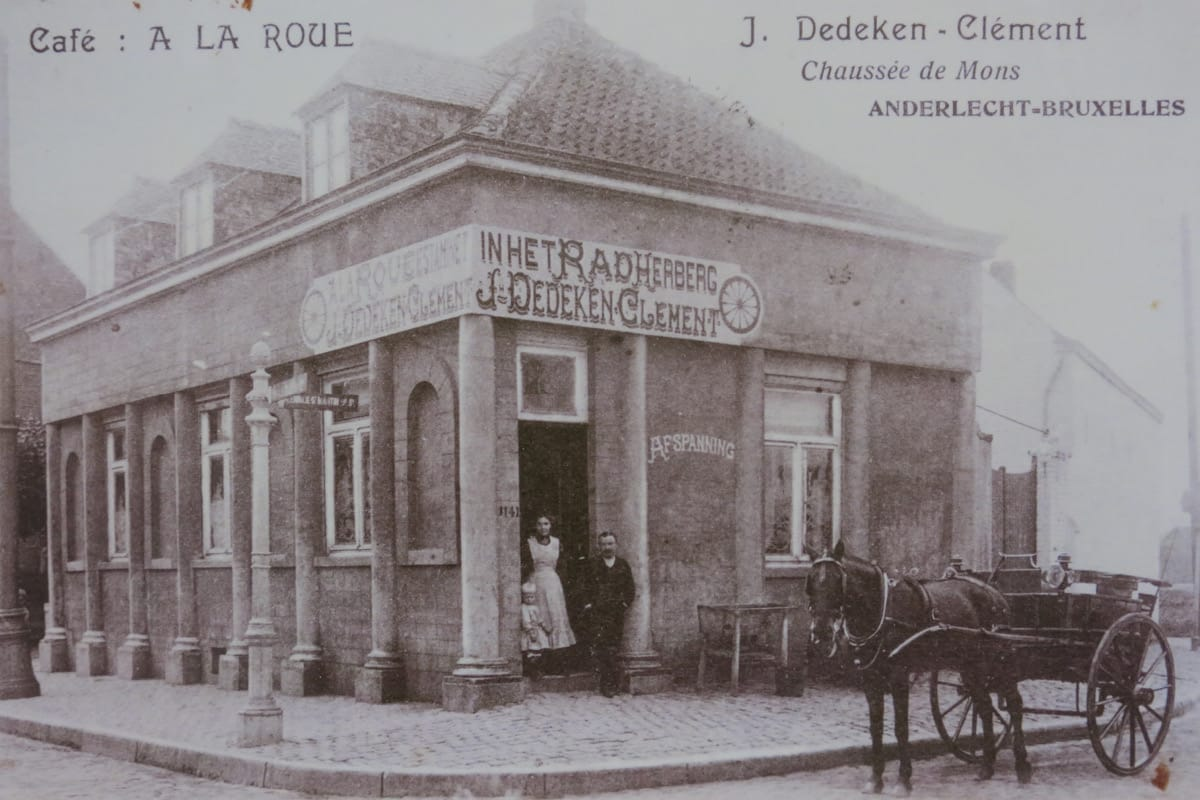
À La Roue café on the Chaussée de Mons/Bergensesteenweg, c. 1910

In the mid-19th century, educational reform reached the area with the establishment of the first community school by Jean-Baptiste François Denys. Previously, Denys had founded the informal Stoeltjesschool (French: École des chaises), where pupils brought their own chairs (stoeltjes) to class. His school laid the groundwork for public education in the expanding suburb.

Following Belgian independence in 1830, urbanisation accelerated. Large-scale urban projects in Brussels displaced many working-class residents, prompting residential growth in the area. In 1901, the parish of Saint Joseph was established, initially marked by the construction of a small chapel on the Rue des Loups/Wolvenstraat, which was later replaced by the larger Church of St. Joseph, completed in 1937.

=== La Roue/Het Rad garden city ===
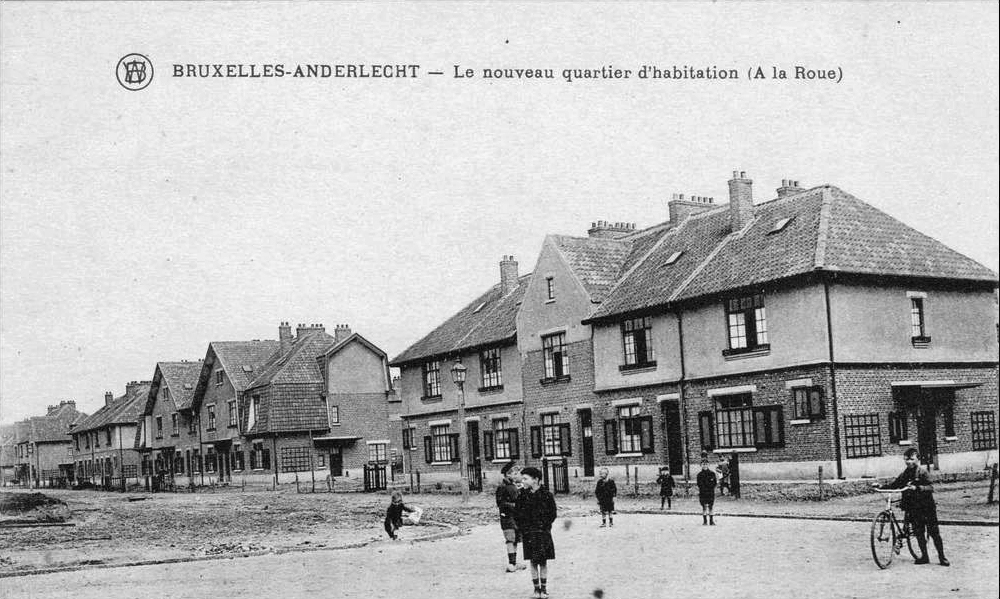
La Roue/Het Rad garden city, c. 1930

In 1907, the Foyer Anderlechtois/Anderlechtse Haard housing cooperative was founded. The cooperative decided to construct a garden city in the area. Construction was quickly halted by World War I and only resumed in earnest from 1920 onwards. The design of the 688 single-family houses was entrusted to a group of architects, including Antoine Pompe, under the leadership of Jean-Jules Eggericx and the urban planner Louis Van der Swaelmen. The project became a testing ground for new construction techniques and materials. The homogeneous ensemble comprised nearly sixty different house models, each featuring a common room, laundry, two storage spaces, three bedrooms, an attic, and a garden of approximately 50 m^{2} (540 sq ft).

The garden city was organised around a large communal green space called the Plaine des Loisirs/Lustplein ("Leisure Plain"), which serves as a social and recreational hub. A primary school was built on part of this area. Nearby streets were given names reflecting the struggles of the working class, such as the Rue des Huit Heures/Achturenstraat ("Eight Hours Street"), the Avenue des Droits de l'Homme/Mensenrechtenlaan ("Human Rights Avenue"), the Rue de la Solidarité/Solidariteitsstraat ("Solidarity Street"), and the Rue de l'Émancipation/Ontvoogdingsstraat ("Emancipation Street").

=== Later development (1950s–present) ===
In the late 1950s, the Food and Chemical Industries Education and Research Centre (CERIA/COOVI) was developed just beyond the urbanised edges of La Roue. Designed by Antoine Courtens and André and Jean Polak after a 1948 competition, the modernist complex features schools, laboratories, residences, and sports facilities in a spacious, green layout. Conceived as a self-sufficient educational site with its own heating and water systems, CERIA remains active today, hosting around 10,000 students in sectors like food science, tourism, and hospitality.

Following the war, many houses were sold to residents who often lacked the means to maintain or adapt them to modern requirements, leading to alterations that sometimes compromised the original character of the neighbourhood. By 2005, the Foyer Anderlechtois still owned 40% of the housing stock and had launched renovation and owner-awareness programmes.

Between 2009 and 2011, the Anderlecht municipality secured over €2 million in federal funding to renovate public spaces. These projects were developed in close consultation with residents through urban planning workshops. Renovations began at the Place Ministre Wauters/Minister Wautersplein and extended to the Avenue des Droits de l'Homme and the Avenue Guillaume Melckmans/Guillaume Melckmanslaan, with further plans to improve neighbouring streets, supported by funding from Beliris and local authorities.

== Sights ==
- The Church of St. Joseph, a Catholic church designed in Art Deco style and built in 1938–39.
- The Municipal School no. 21, another Art Deco building from 1939.
- The Food and Chemical Industries Education and Research Center (CERIA/COOVI), one of the largest agribusiness industry campuses in Belgium.
- The headquarters of Coca-Cola Belgium and Luxembourg, at 1424, chaussée de Mons/Bergensesteenweg.
- The former depot and station of the National Company of Light Railways (NMVB/SNCV).
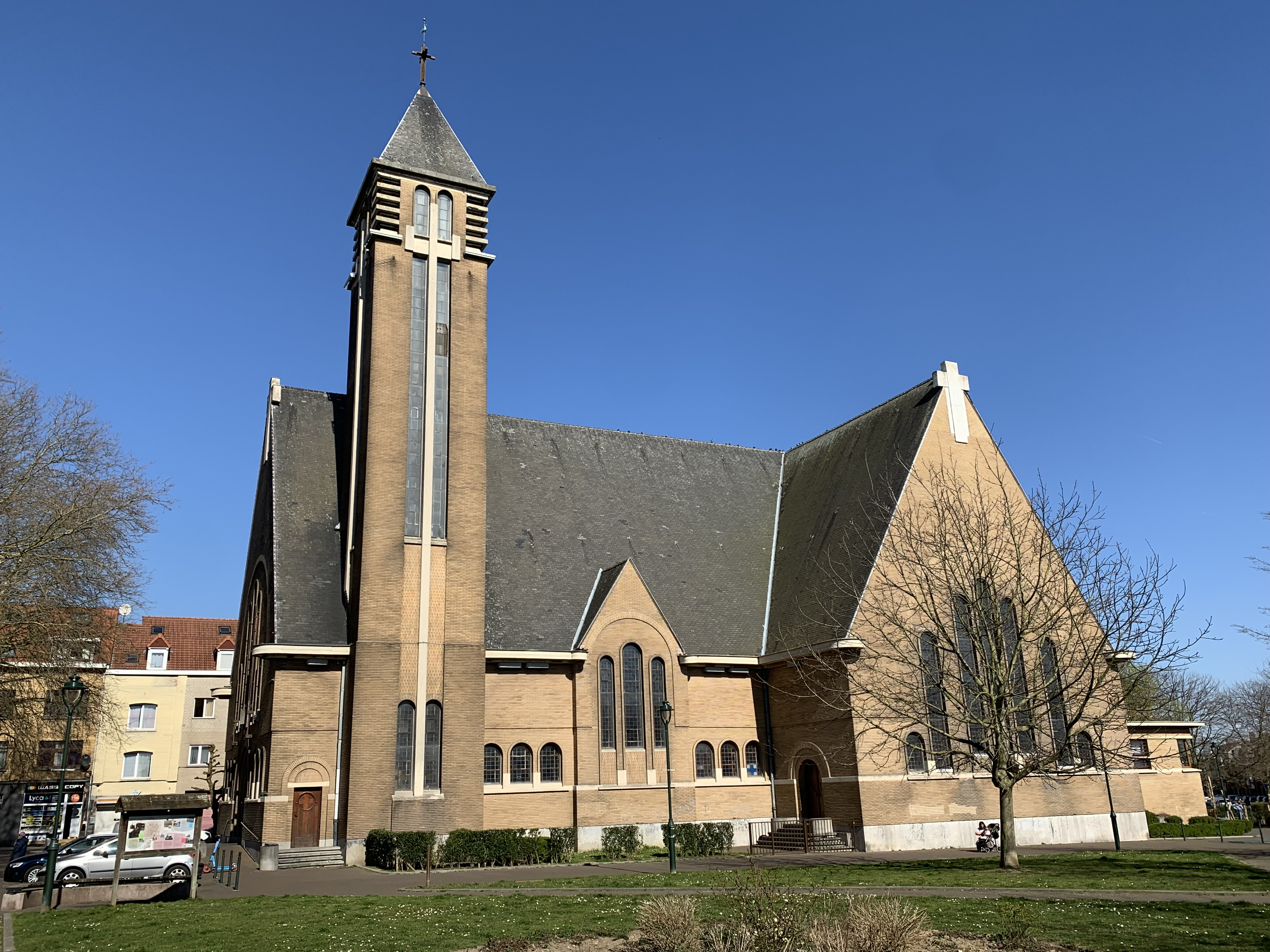
Church of St. Joseph

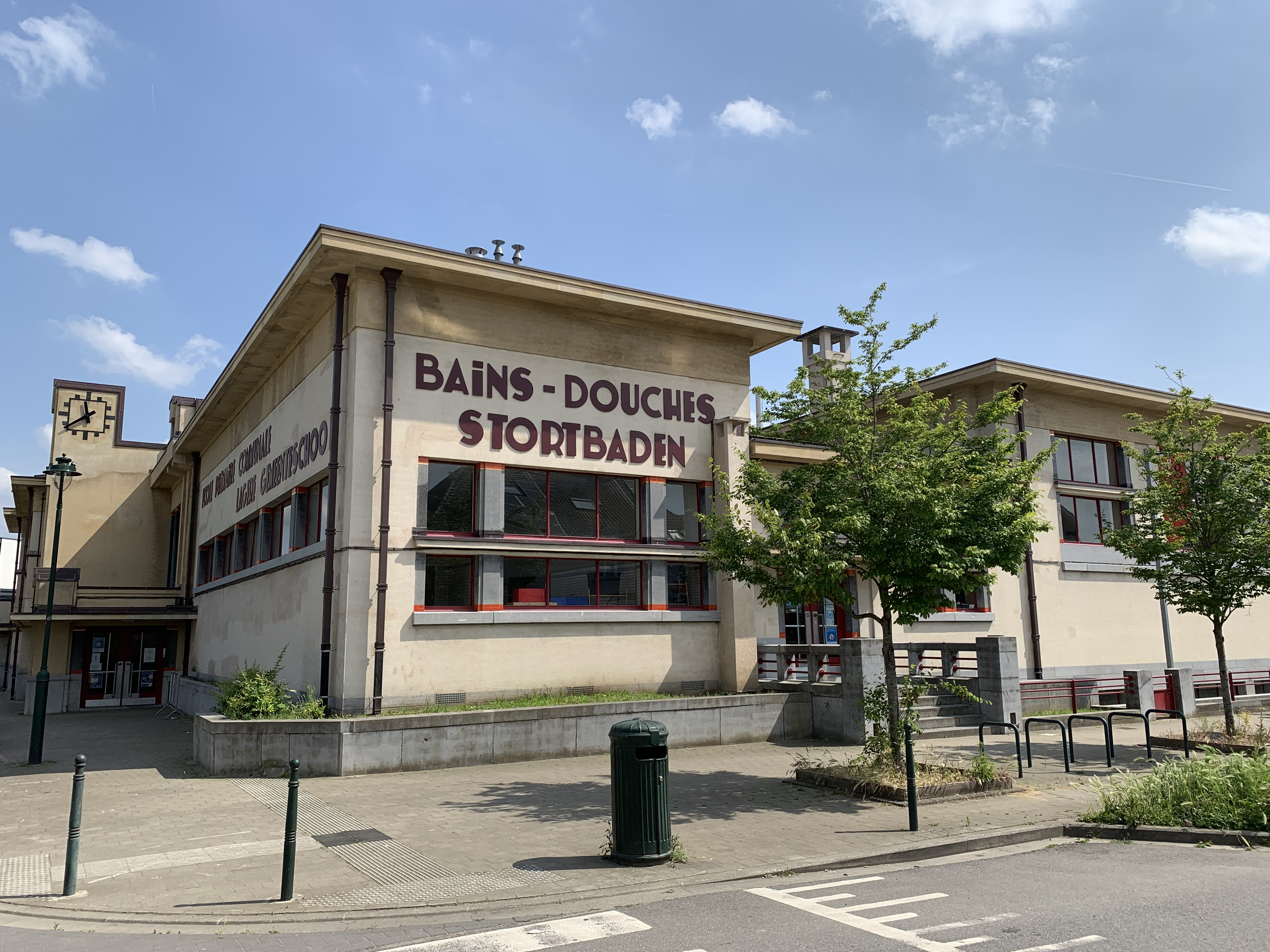
Municipal School no. 21

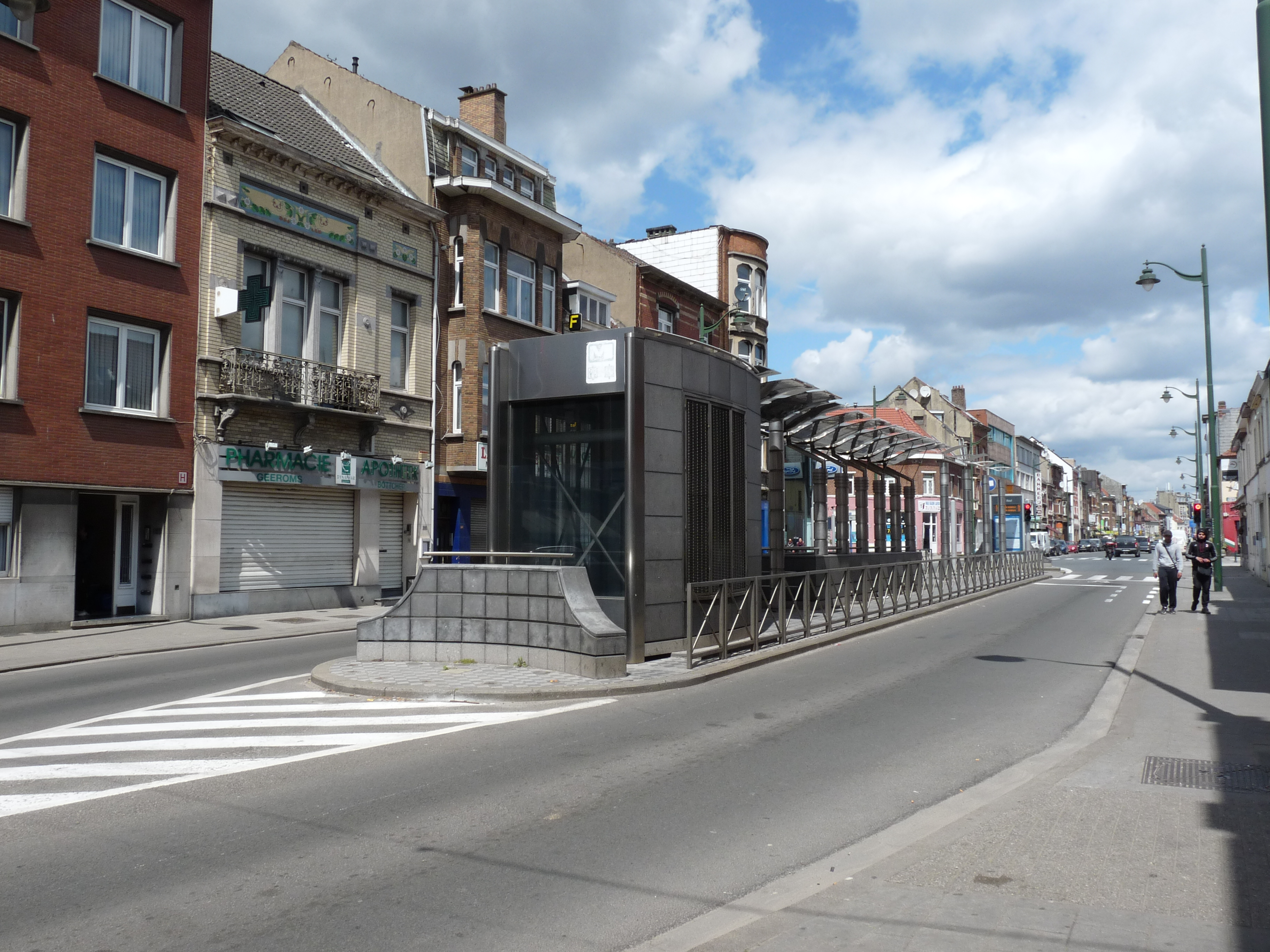
La Roue/Het Rad metro station

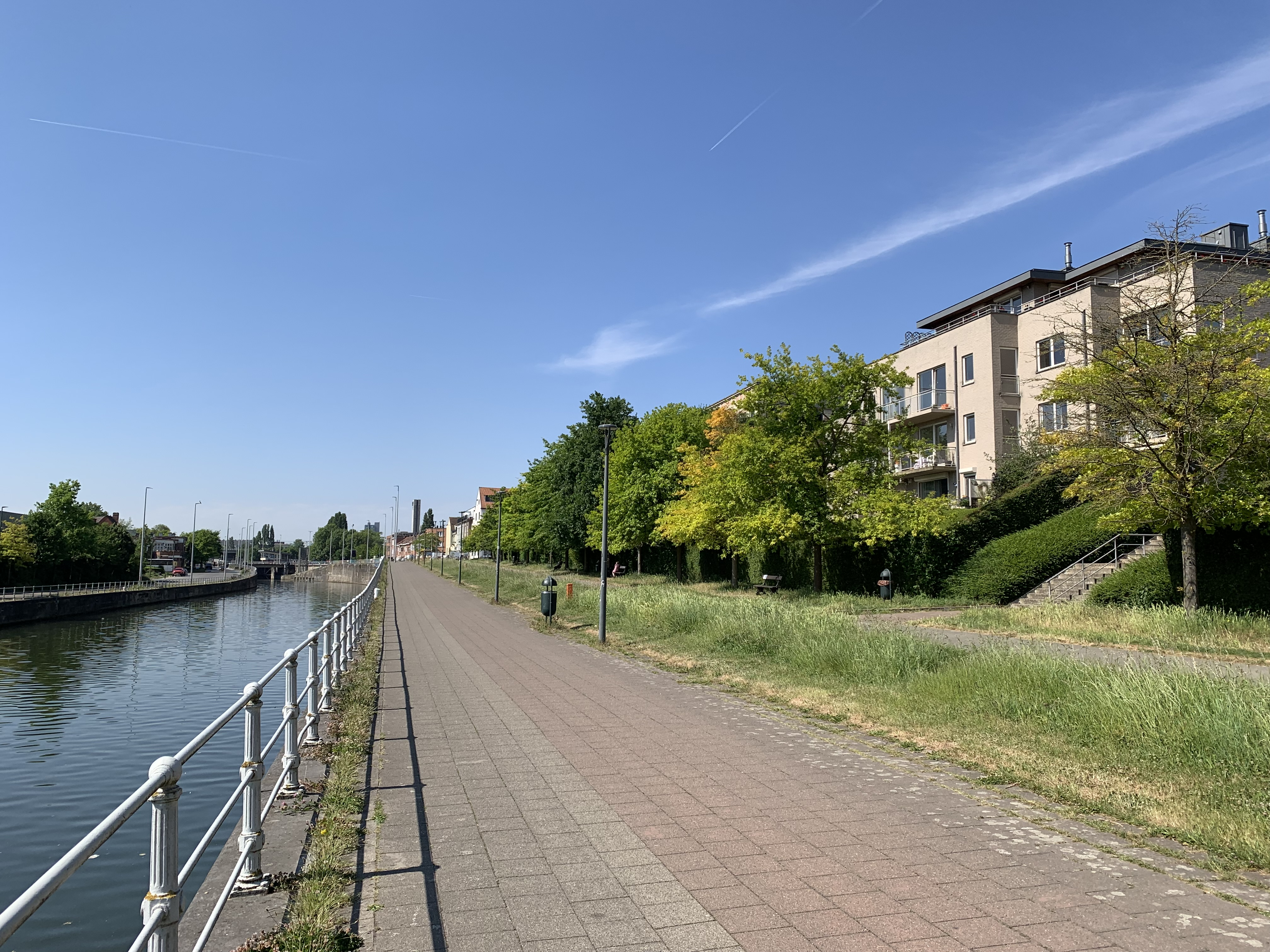
View along the canal in La Roue

== See also ==
- Neighbourhoods in Brussels
- History of Brussels
