= Saint-Guidon metro station =

Metro station in Brussels, Belgium

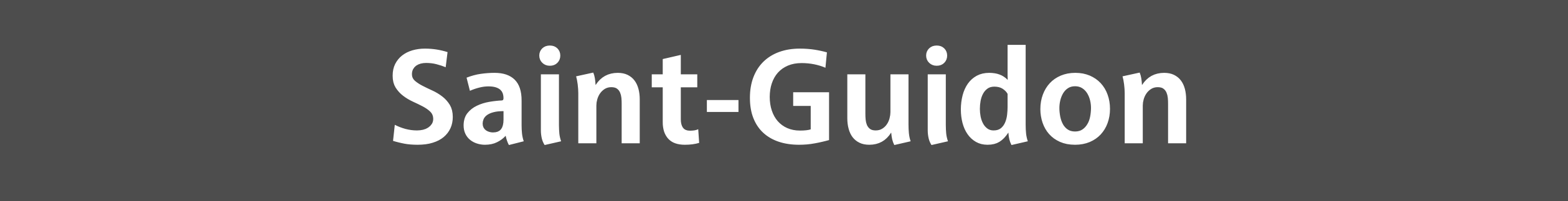
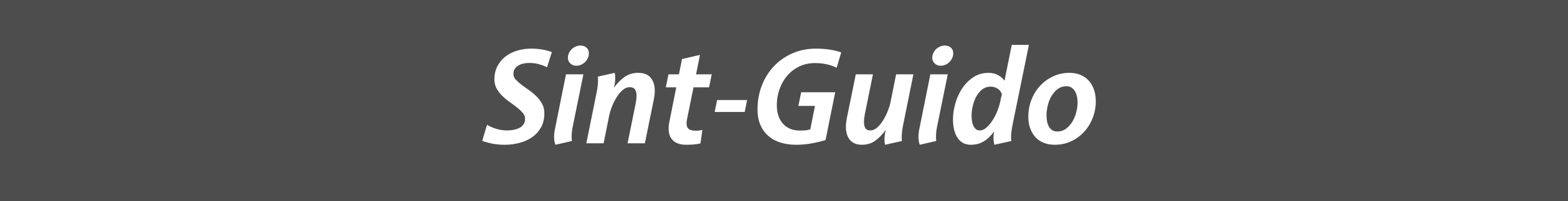

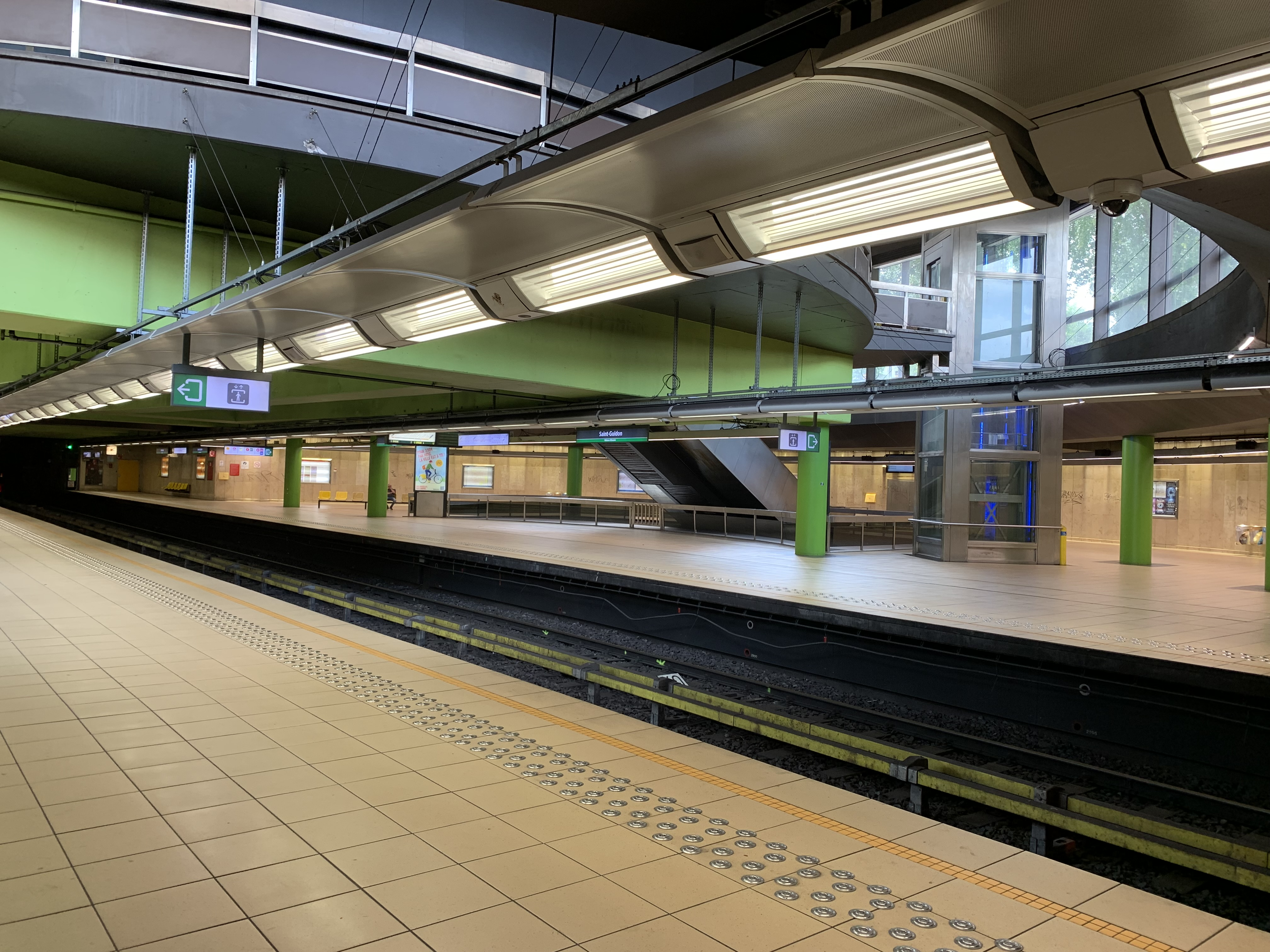
- Saint Guidon/Sint Guido metro station

General information
- Location: Cours Saint Guidon / Sint-Guidocorso; 1070 Anderlecht, Brussels-Capital Region, Belgium
- Coordinates: 50°50′06″N 4°18′20″E
- Owner: STIB/MIVB
- Platforms: 2
- Tracks: 2

Construction
- Structure type: Below grade
- Accessible: Yes

History
- Opened: 6 October 1982; 43 years ago

Services
Preceding station	Brussels Metro	Following station
Veeweyde/Veeweide towards Erasme/Erasmus	Line 5	Aumale towards Herrmann-Debroux
Location

Saint-Guidon (French, pronounced [sɛ̃ ɡidɔ̃]) or Sint-Guido (Dutch, pronounced [sɪnt ˈxiːdoː]) is a Brussels Metro station on the western branch of line 5. It is located in the municipality of Anderlecht, in the western part of Brussels, Belgium. The station received its name from the aboveground Collegiate Church of St. Peter and St. Guido, itself named after Saint Guy, the patron saint of Anderlecht.

The metro station opened on 6 October 1982 as part of the Beekkant–Saint-Guidon/Sint-Guido extension of former line 1B. Prior to the opening of an extension to Veeweyde/Veeweide on 5 July 1985, the station was the western terminus of the metro. On 10 January 1992, a further extension from Veeweyde westwards to Bizet was opened (further extended in 2003 to Erasme/Erasmus). Then, following the reorganisation of the Brussels Metro on 4 April 2009, it is served by the extended east–west line 5.

== Area ==
Nearby sights include the Collegiate Church of St. Peter and St. Guido (the main church of Anderlecht, for which the station was named); Erasmus House (a museum devoted to the Dutch humanist writer and theologian Erasmus of Rotterdam); the old beguinage of Anderlecht (a late medieval lay convent, now a museum dedicated to religious community life); as well as Astrid Park, which is home to the Constant Vanden Stock Stadium, where R.S.C. Anderlecht football club play their home games.

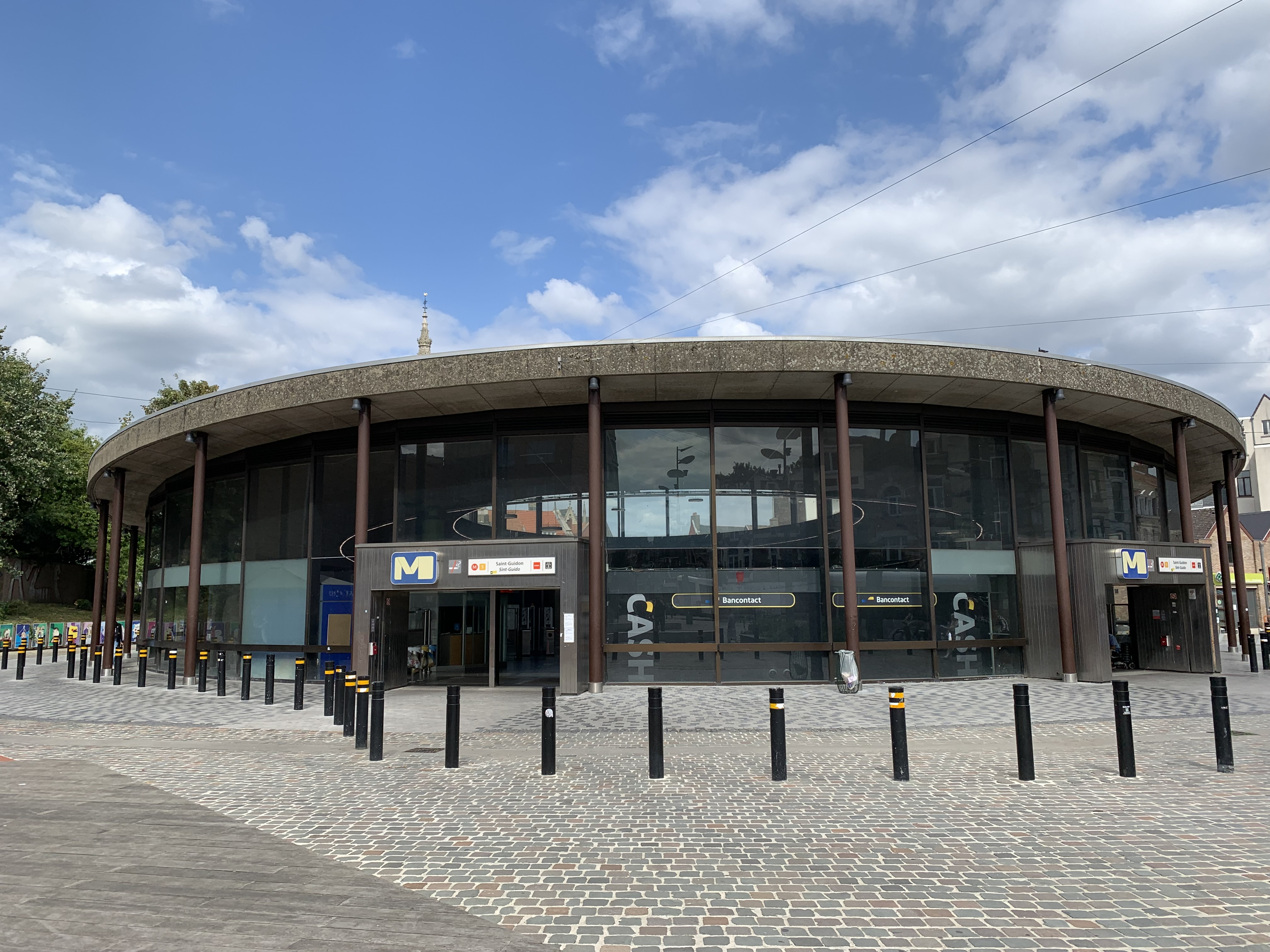
Entrance at street level

== See also ==
- Transport in Brussels
- History of Brussels
