= Eddy Merckx metro station =

Metro station in Brussels, Belgium

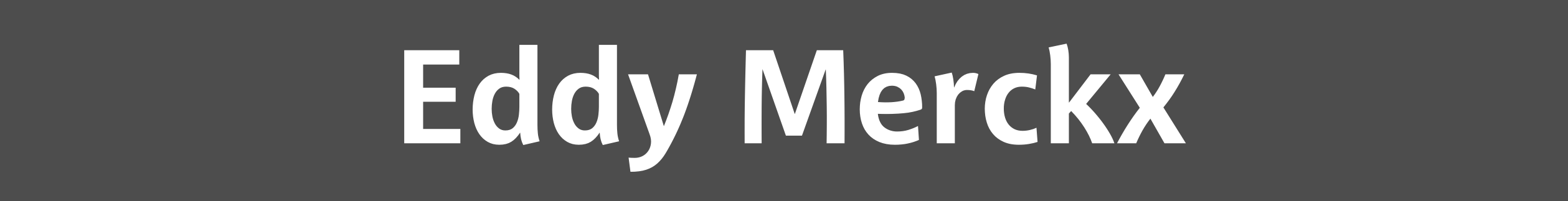

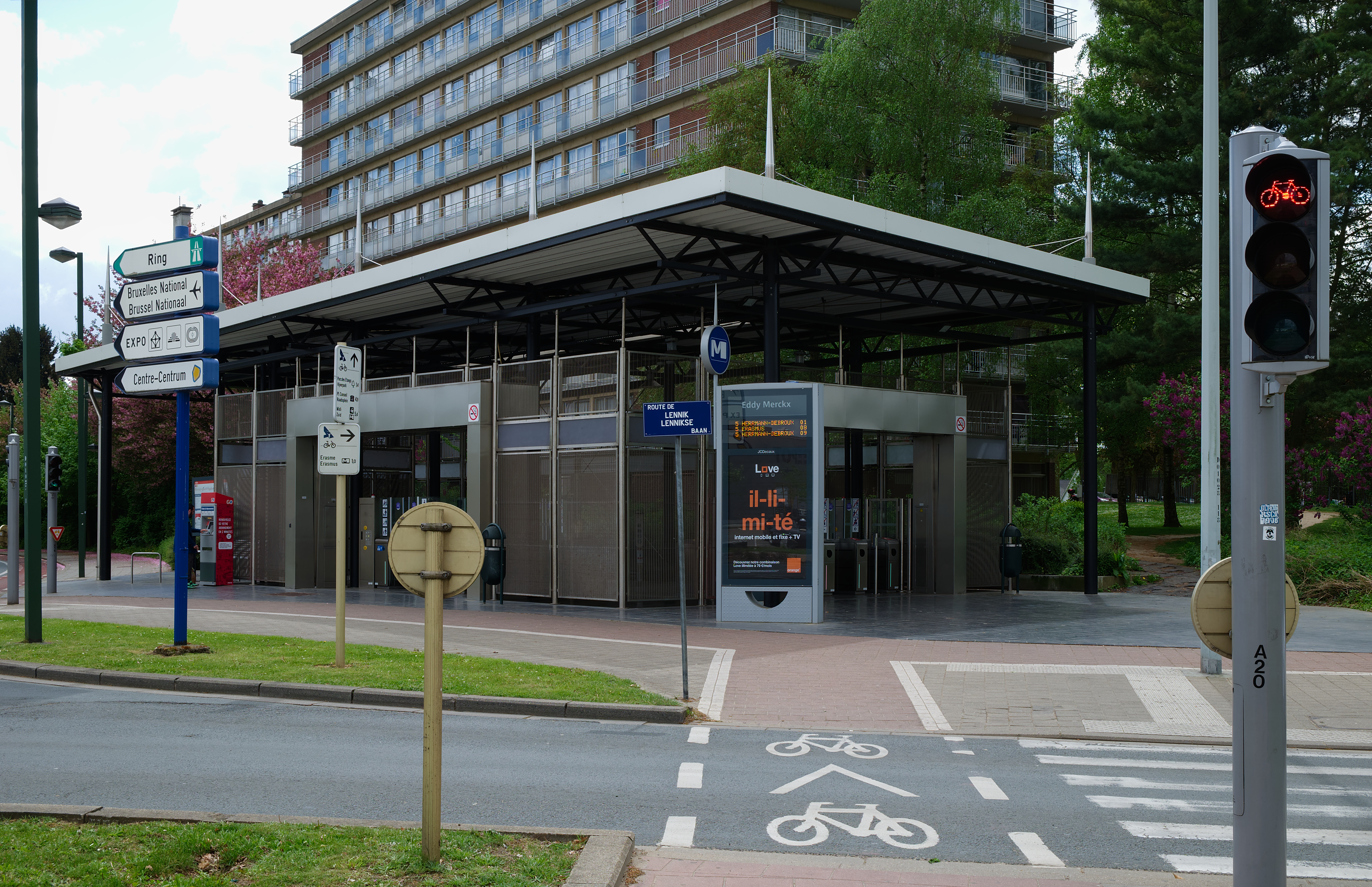
- Eddy Merckx metro station

General information
- Location: Boulevard Josse Leemans / Josse Leemanslaan; 1070 Anderlecht, Brussels-Capital Region, Belgium
- Coordinates: 50°49′00″N 4°16′51″E
- Owner: STIB/MIVB
- Platforms: 1 island platform
- Tracks: 2

Construction
- Structure type: Underground
- Accessible: Yes

History
- Opened: 15 September 2003; 23 years ago

Services
Preceding station	Brussels Metro	Following station
Erasme/Erasmus Terminus	Line 5	CERIA/COOVI towards Herrmann-Debroux
Location

Eddy Merckx (French pronunciation: [ɛdi mɛʁks]; Dutch pronunciation: [ˈɛdi ˈmɛr(ə)ks]) is a Brussels Metro station on the western branch of line 5. It is located in the municipality of Anderlecht, in the western part of Brussels, Belgium. The station is named after the Belgian cyclist Eddy Merckx, five-times winner of the Tour de France. It is decorated with objects commemorating Merckx, including, displayed in a glass cabinet on the station platform, the bicycle on which he set the hour record in 1972.

The metro station opened on 15 September 2003 as part of the Bizet–Erasme/Erasmus extension of former line 1B, including the stations Erasme/Erasmus, CERIA/COOVI and La Roue/Het Rad. Then, following the reorganisation of the Brussels Metro on 4 April 2009, it is served by the extended east–west line 5.

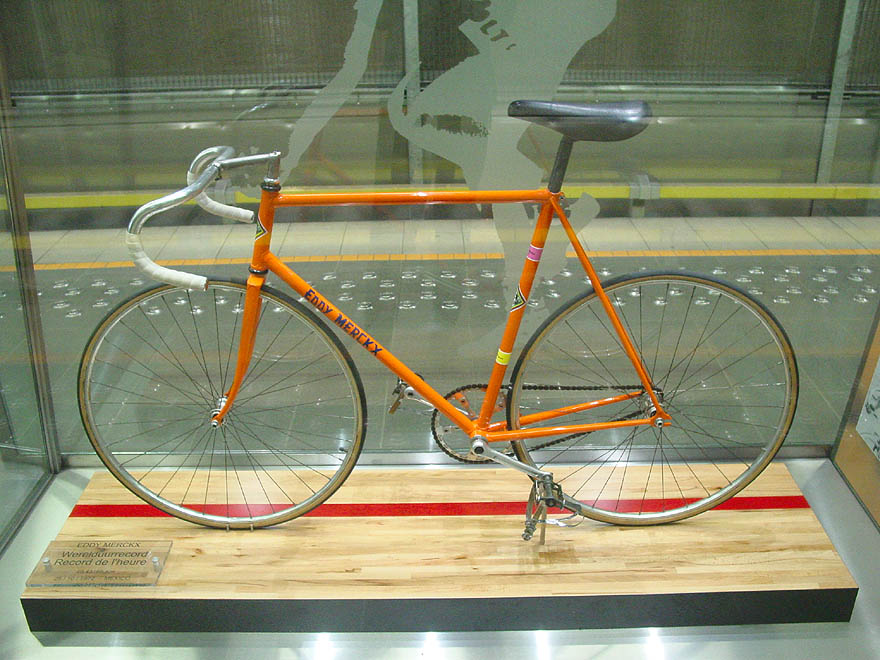
Eddy Merckx's one-hour record bicycle is on display in the station.

== Area ==
Nearby landmarks include:

- Anderlecht Cemetery
- Cora Anderlecht hypermarket
- Steinerschool Brussels

== See also ==
- Transport in Brussels
- History of Brussels
