= Astrid Park =

Park in Anderlecht, Belgium

- Parc Astrid (French); Astridpark (Dutch)
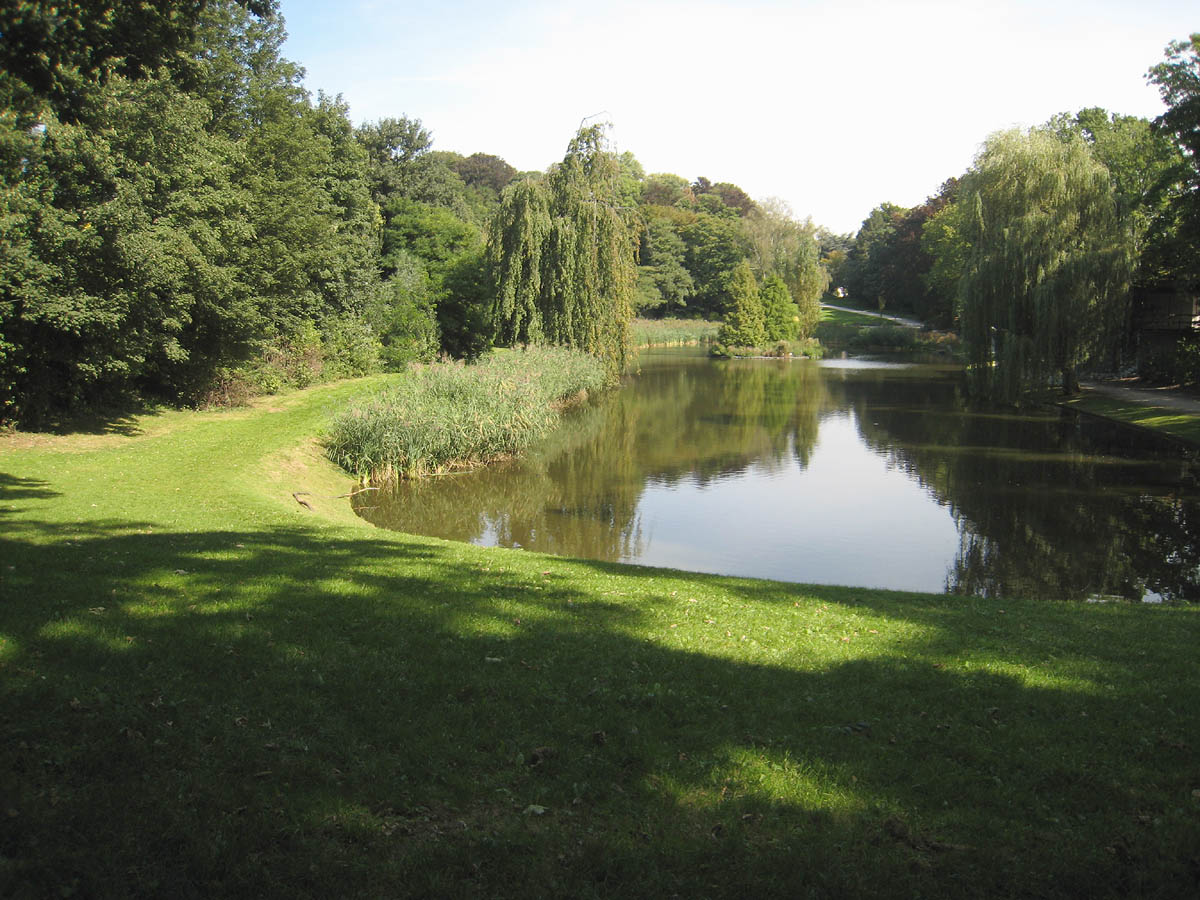
- Astrid Park's pond, facing north
- Interactive map of Astrid Park
- Type: Public park
- Location: Anderlecht, Brussels-Capital Region, Belgium
- Coordinates: 50°49′59″N 4°17′53″E
- Area: 9.44 ha (23.3 acres)
- Created: 13 August 1911
- Status: Open year-round
- Public transit: 5 Saint-Guidon/Sint-Guido and Veeweyde/Veeweide

Astrid Park (French: Parc Astrid, pronounced [paʁk astʁid]; Dutch: Astridpark, pronounced [ˈɑstrɪtˌpɑr(ə)k]) is an urban public park in the municipality of Anderlecht in Brussels, Belgium. It is named in honour of Queen Astrid, the fourth Queen of the Belgians and wife of King Leopold III. It is home to the historic football club RSC Anderlecht, with the Constant Vanden Stock Stadium being located in the park's north-western corner.

The park is surrounded by the Avenue du Roi-Soldat/Koning-Soldaatlaan, the Avenue Eugène Ysaÿe/Eugène Ysayelaan, the Avenue Théo Verbeeck/Théo Verbeecklaan and the Avenue Victor et Jules Bertaux/Victor en Jules Bertauxlaan.

== History ==
The park was inaugurated on 13 August 1911 and was designed in its current form by the landscape architect Jules Buyssens in 1926. It was named the Parc du Meir/Meirpark ("Meir Park") until 1935, when the mayor of Anderlecht decided to change its name in memory of Queen Astrid, the fourth Queen of the Belgians and first wife of King Leopold III, who died in a car crash that year.

Since 1917, the football club RSC Anderlecht has played its home matches in the Constant Vanden Stock Stadium (formerly called the Émile Versé Stadium and also known as the Lotto Park for sponsorship reasons), located within the park. Therefore, the stadium is sometimes metonymically referred to as Parc Astrid.

== Gallery ==
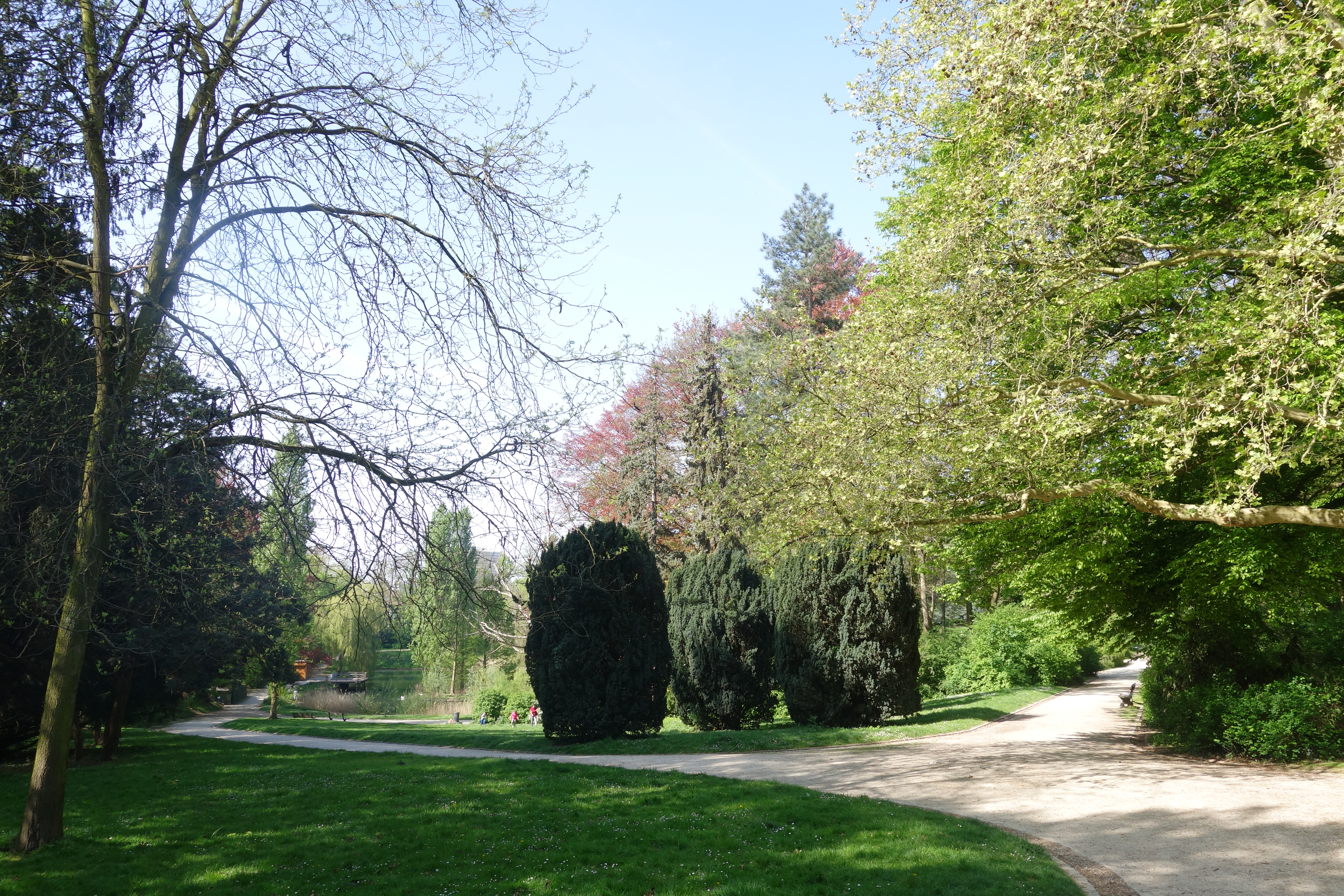
View towards the pond

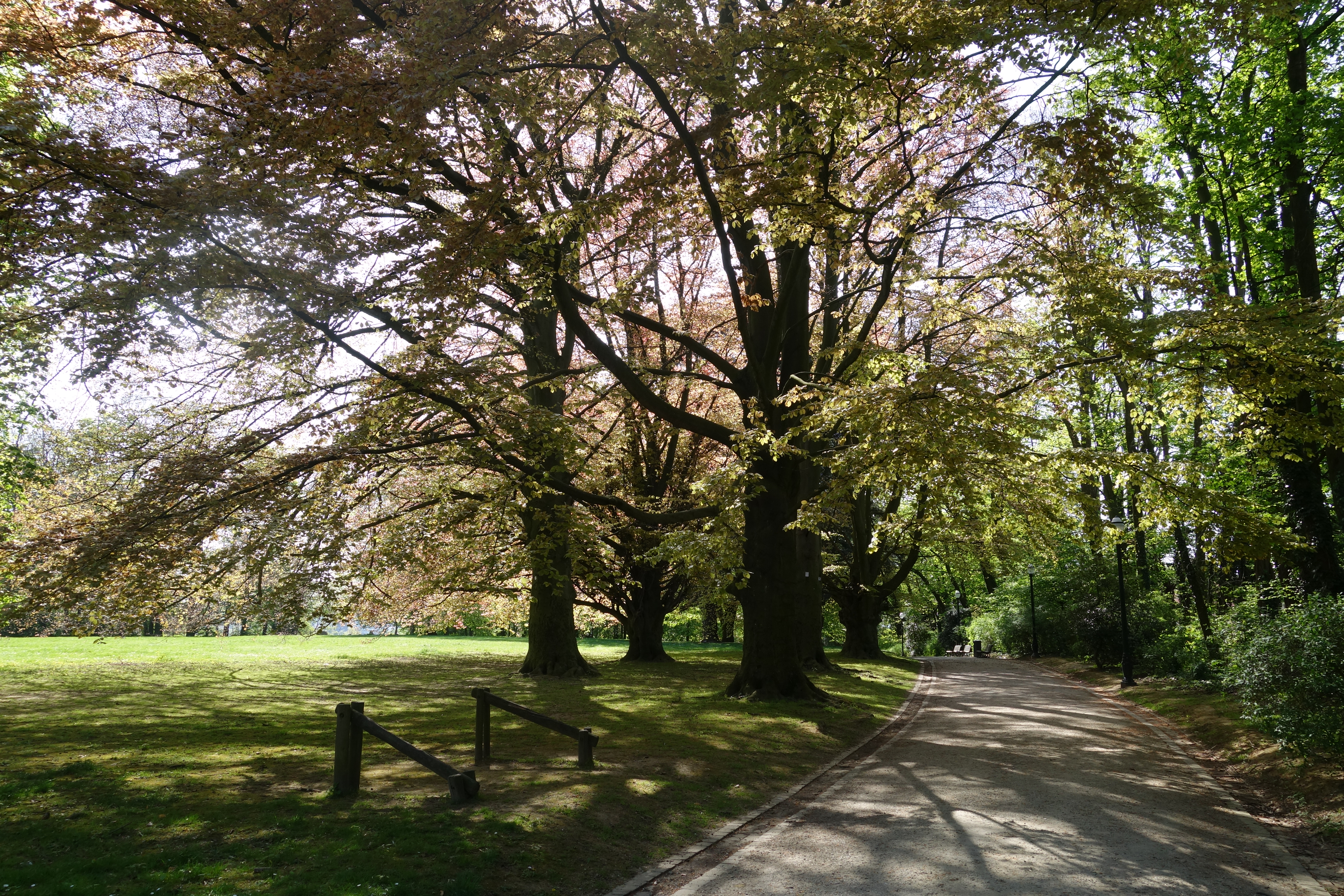
Upper part

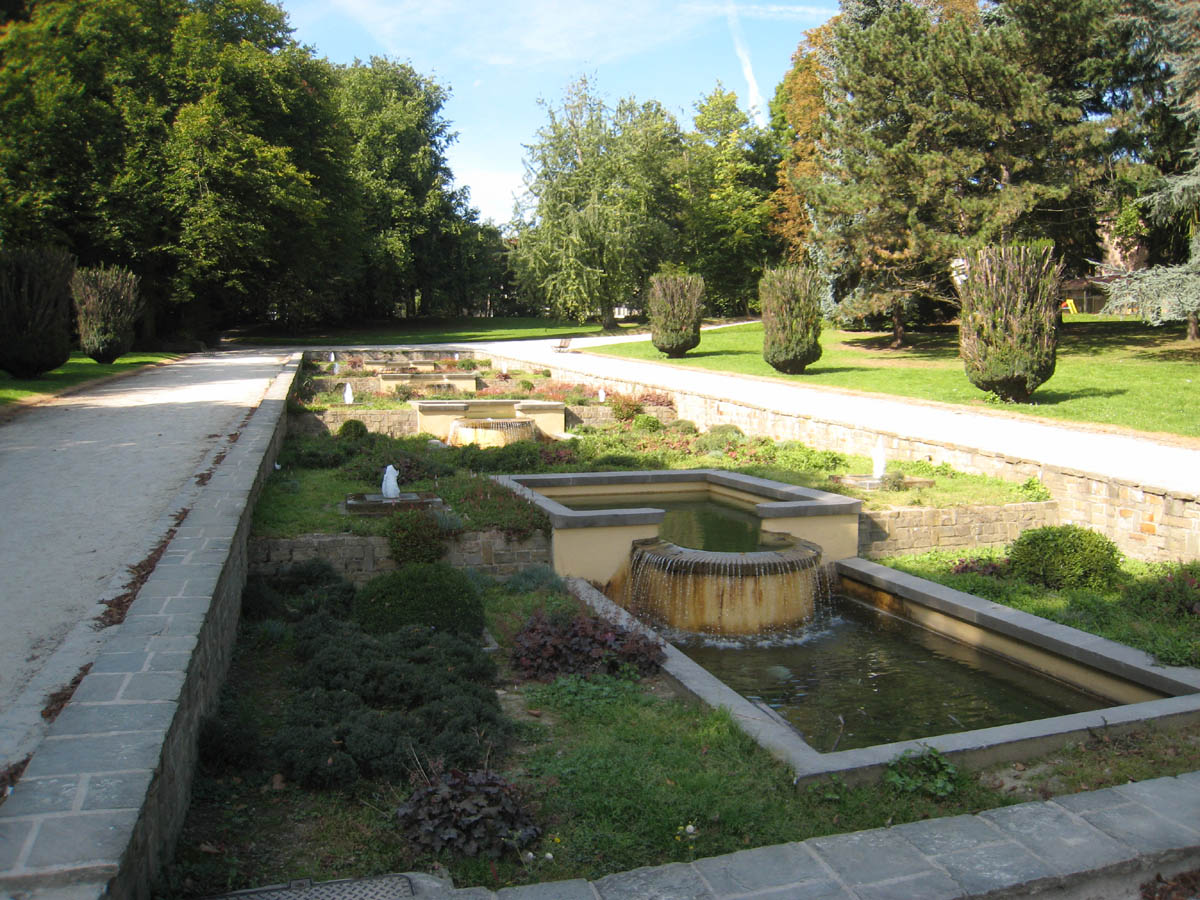
Water feature

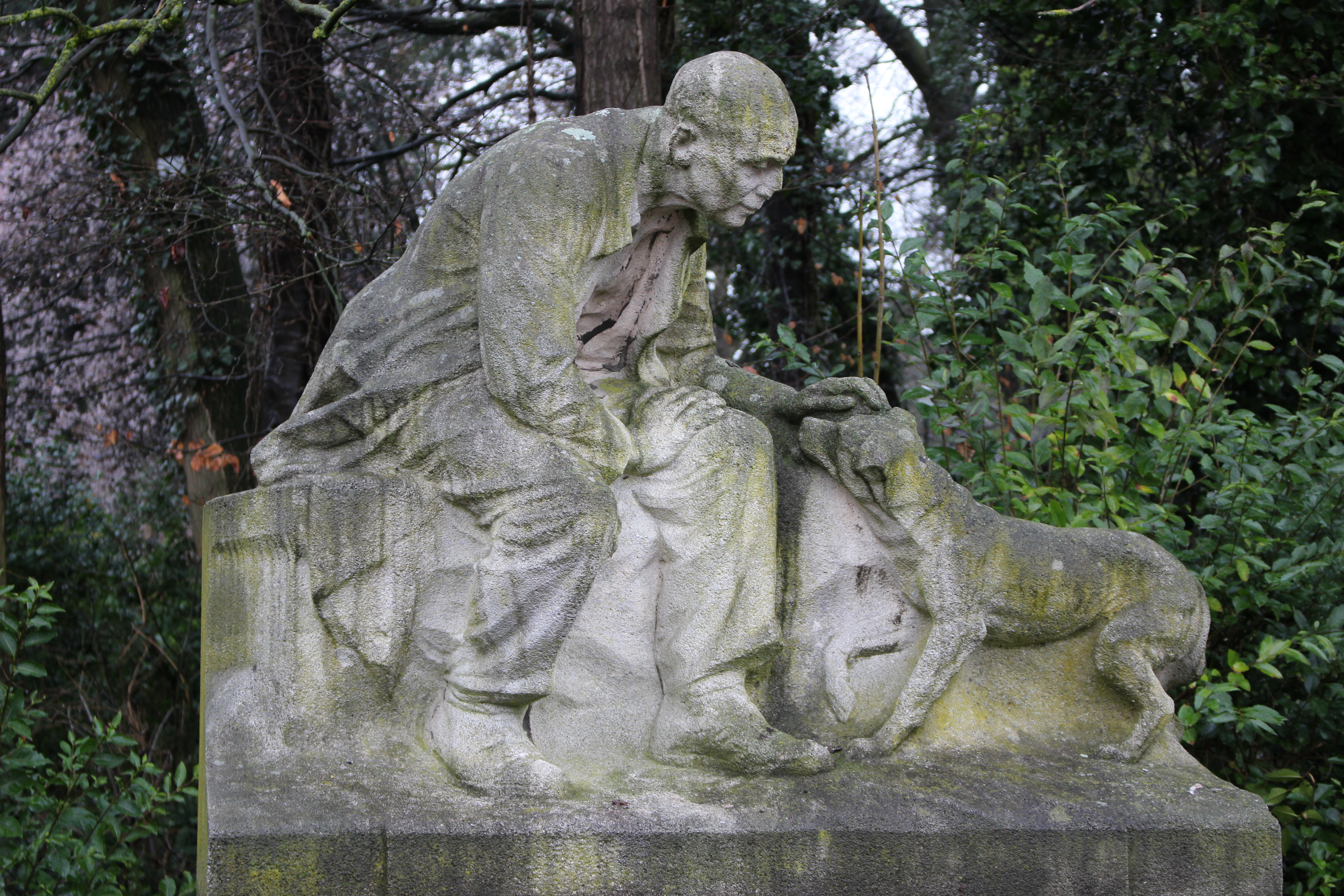
Jules Ruhl statue

== See also ==
- List of parks and gardens in Brussels
- History of Brussels
- Belgium in the long nineteenth century
