= CERIA metro station =

Metro station in Brussels, Belgium

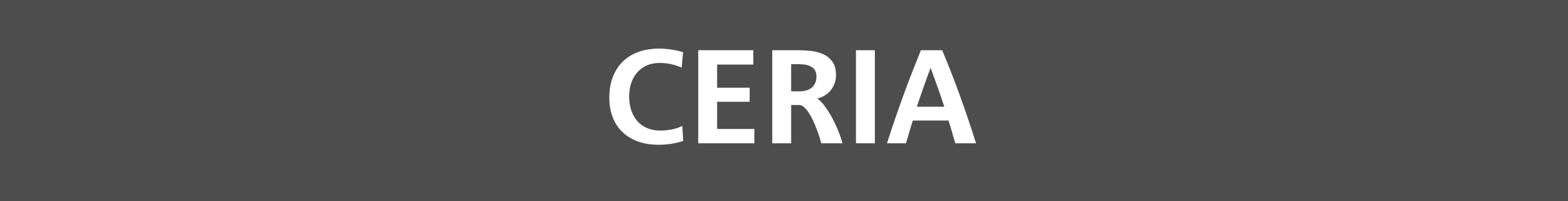
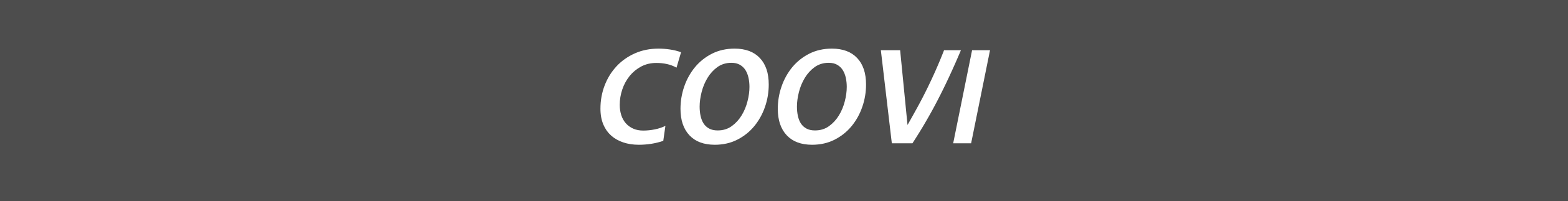

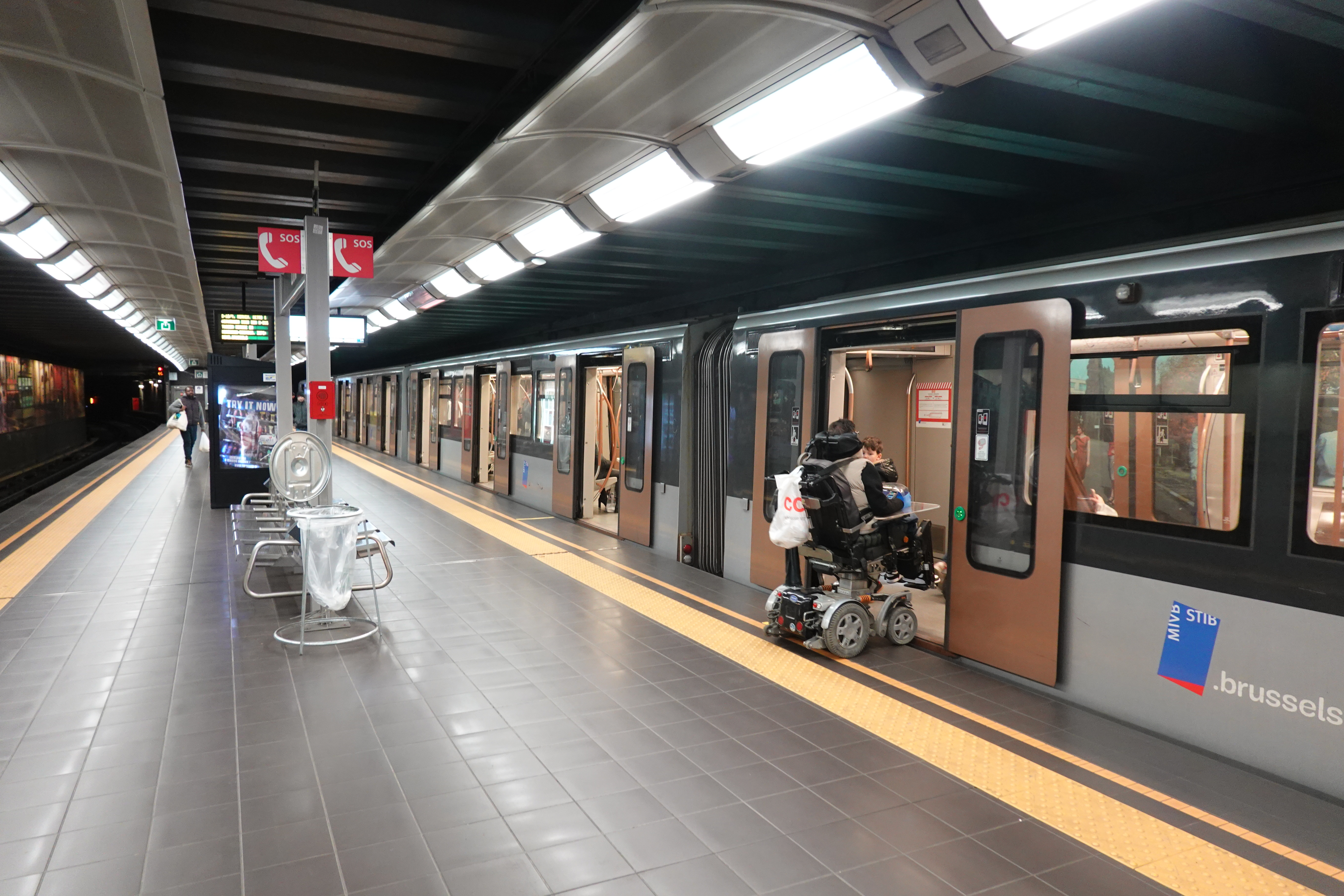
- CERIA/COOVI metro station

General information
- Location: Chaussée de Mons / Bergense Steenweg; 1070 Anderlecht, Brussels-Capital Region, Belgium
- Coordinates: 50°48′59″N 4°17′24″E
- Owner: STIB/MIVB
- Platforms: 1 island platform
- Tracks: 2

Construction
- Structure type: Underground
- Accessible: Yes

History
- Opened: 15 September 2003; 22 years ago

Services
Preceding station	Brussels Metro	Following station
Eddy Merckx towards Erasme/Erasmus	Line 5	La Roue/Het Rad towards Herrmann-Debroux
Location

CERIA (French) or COOVI (Dutch) is a Brussels Metro station on the western branch of line 5. It is located in the municipality of Anderlecht, in the western part of Brussels, Belgium. The station serves the Food and Chemical Industries Education and Research Center (CERIA/COOVI), after which it is named, and is also the closest metro station to the IKEA Anderlecht store.

The metro station opened on 15 September 2003 as part of the Bizet–Erasme/Erasmus extension of former line 1B, including the stations Erasme/Erasmus, Eddy Merckx and La Roue/Het Rad. Then, following the reorganisation of the Brussels Metro on 4 April 2009, it is served by the extended east–west line 5.

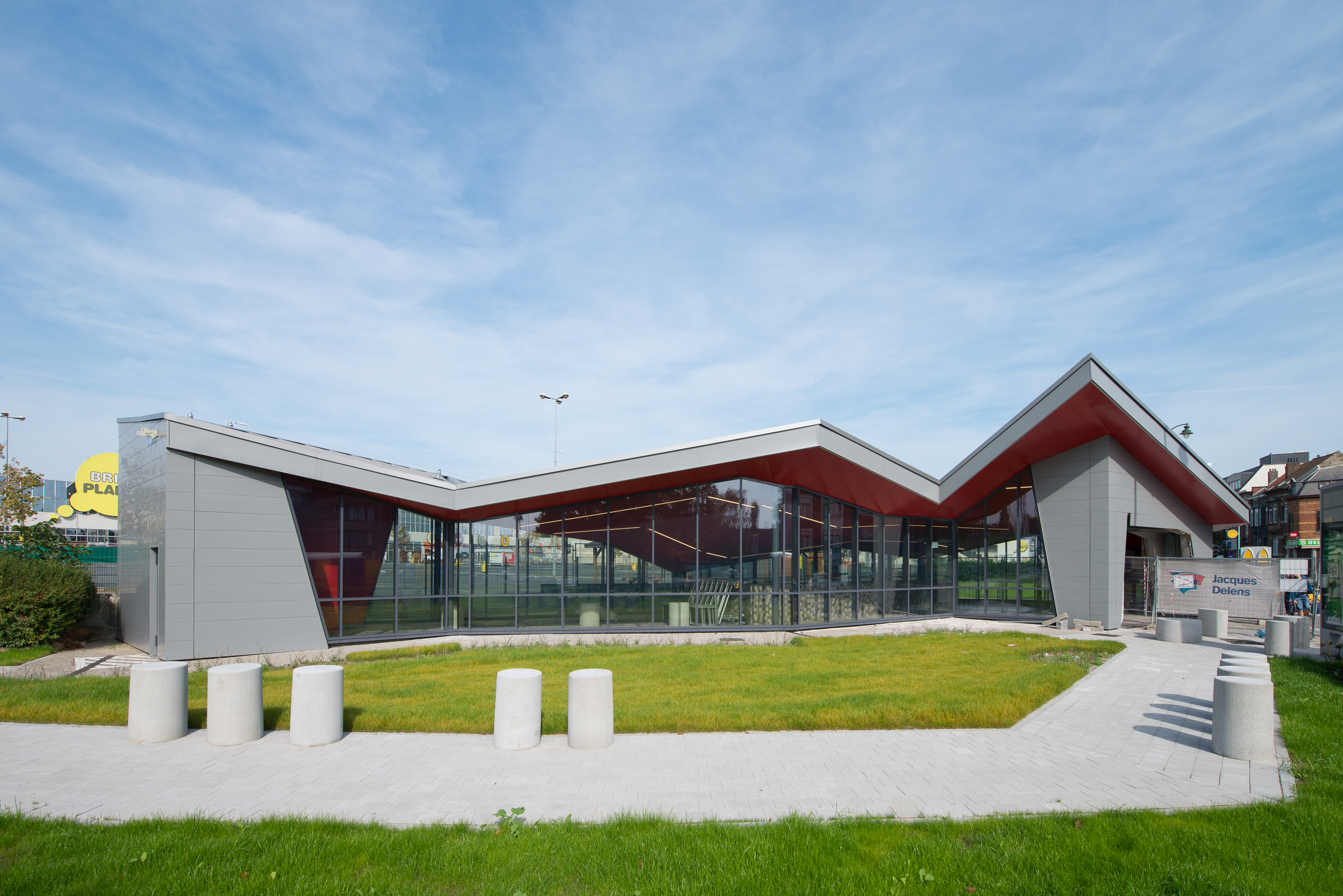
Entrance to the station

== See also ==
- Transport in Brussels
- History of Brussels
