= Veeweyde metro station =

Metro station in Brussels, Belgium

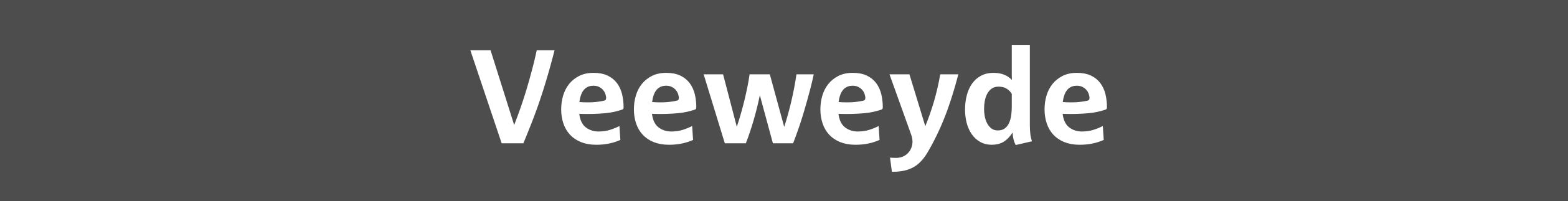
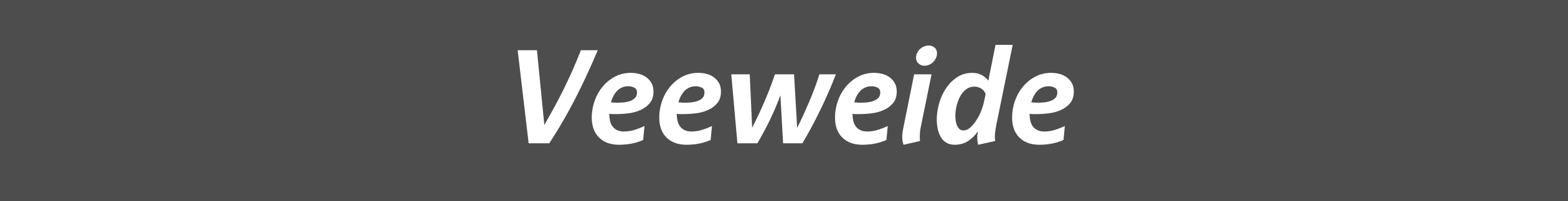

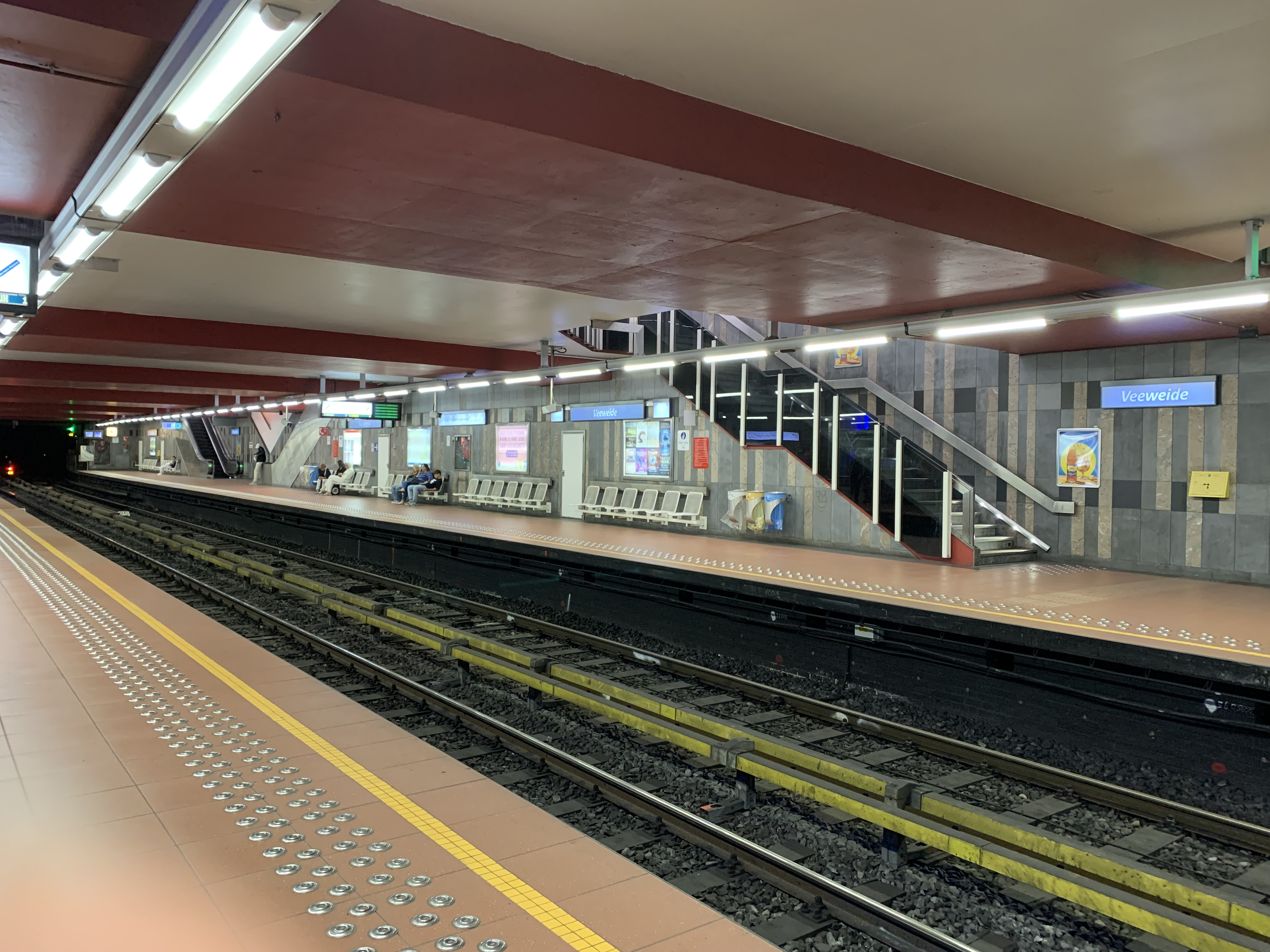
- Veeweyde/Veeweide metro station

General information
- Location: Avenue Gounod / Gounodlaan; 1070 Anderlecht, Brussels-Capital Region, Belgium
- Coordinates: 50°49′48″N 4°18′03″E
- Owner: STIB/MIVB
- Platforms: 2
- Tracks: 2

Construction
- Structure type: Underground
- Accessible: Yes

History
- Opened: 5 July 1985; 41 years ago

Services
Preceding station	Brussels Metro	Following station
Bizet towards Erasme/Erasmus	Line 5	Saint-Guidon/Sint-Guido towards Herrmann-Debroux
Location

Veeweyde (French, pronounced [vewɛjd]; former Dutch spelling) or Veeweide (modern Dutch, pronounced [ˈveːˌʋɛidə]) is a Brussels Metro station on the western branch of line 5. It is located in the municipality of Anderlecht, in the western part of Brussels, Belgium. The station takes its name from the nearby street Rue de Veeweyde/Veeweidestraat.

The metro station opened on 5 July 1985 and was the western terminus of former line 1B until the opening of an extension to Bizet on 10 January 1992 (further extended in 2003 to Erasme/Erasmus). Then, following the reorganisation of the Brussels Metro on 4 April 2009, it is served by the extended east–west line 5.

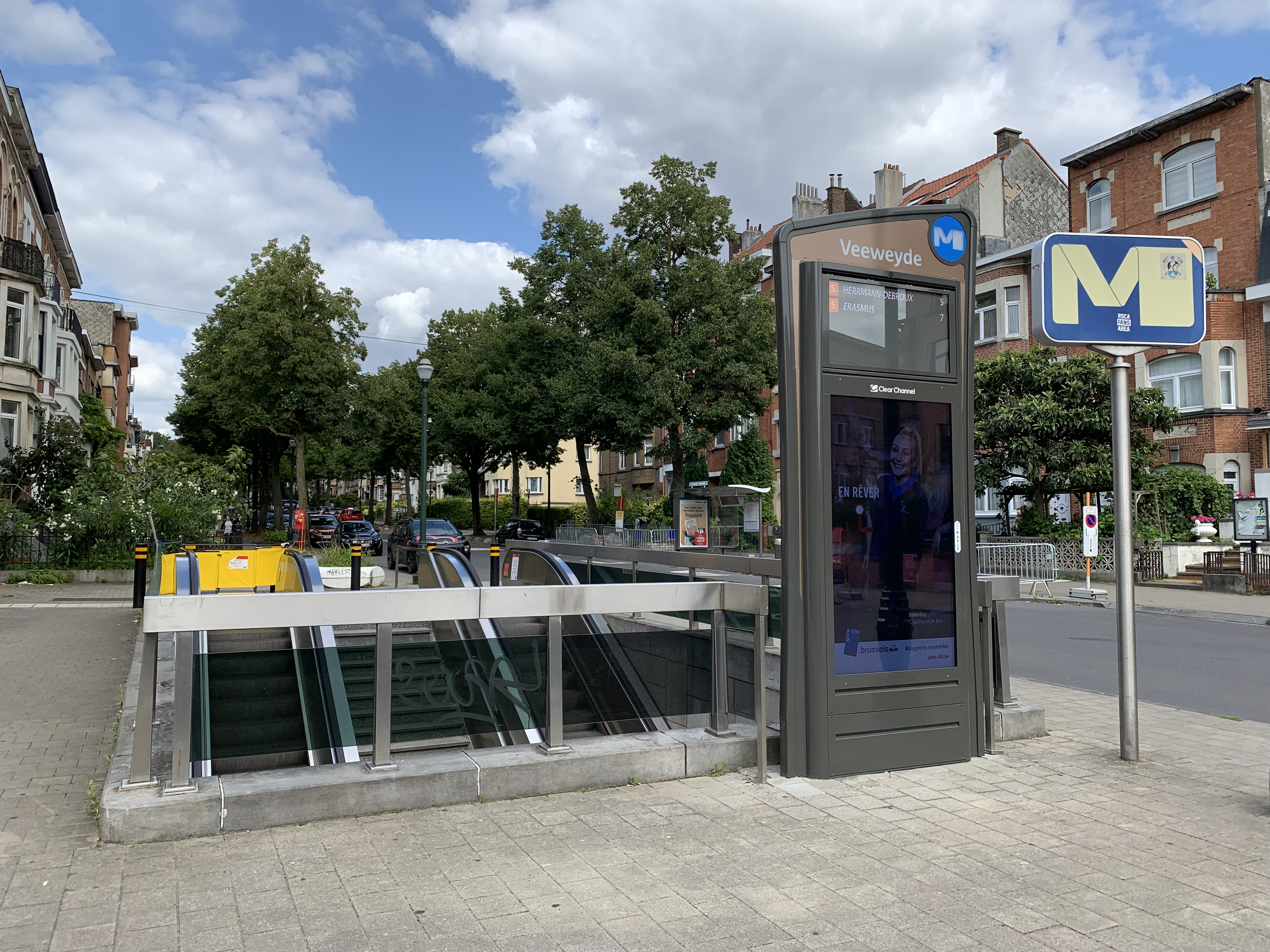
Entrance at street level

== See also ==
- Transport in Brussels
- History of Brussels
