= Maurice Wyckaert =

Belgian artist (1923–1996)

- Born: 15 November 1923; Brussels, Belgium
- Died: 17 July 1996 (aged 72); Brussels, Belgium
- Known for: Painting, gouache, drawing, printmaking

Maurice Wyckaert (15 November 1923 – 17 July 1996) was a Belgian artist. He is a neo-expressionistic, lyrical abstract painter, gouache designer and printmaker. He was educated at the Academy of Brussels (1940–1947 and 1949–1950) and in Saint-Josse-ten-Noode and the Vrije Atelier of Woluwe-Saint-Lambert. He debuted with wonderful expressionistic still life, reminiscent of Jean Brusselmans. Much early work dealt with stills of vegetables. Later Wyckaert became interested by William Turner and James Ensor and their ideas of luminism.

In 1955 Wyckaert started to lyrically abstract interpret his environment, which contained noticeable influences of Eastern calligraphy. From this, he evolved to a dynamic abstract combination of attractive colors, which harmoniously shape a free interpretation of landscape. Although Wyckaert was already critically acclaimed, by receiving several honors such as the Jules Raeymaekers of the Royal Academy Award, an honorable mention by JPB (1957) and an honorable mention by São Paulo Art Biennial (1961), his true breakthrough began at the beginning of the 1970s. Around this time he started experimenting with gouache, printmaking and lithography.

Wyckaert was known for his pro-active involvement in several art movements such as being the Co-founder of Belgian art magazine De Meridiaan and Taptoe Brussels (1955). Also he was a member of Présence (1949), the Situationist International (SI) and the International Movement for an Imaginist Bauhaus and well known for his influence and intimate friendship with several CoBrA-members.

He was honored by the SI to read the Declaration in the Name of the Fourth SI Conference to the Institute of Contemporary Arts, at the Institute of Contemporary Arts on 28 September 1960. After the city of Brussels started with art projects to enhance their underground, Wyckaert was appointed to decorate the Jacques Brel metro station. He has exhibited his work in several renowned museums from Rome to São Paulo.

== Chief Editor of 'De Meridiaan' ==
De Meridiaan, later published as De kunst-meridiaan, was a Flemish literary magazine that published bimonthly in Belgium and the Netherlands from 1951 until 1960. It was founded by Belgian artist Maurice Wyckaert, poet Clara Haesaert and her husband Gentil Haesaert. De Meridiaan was the main competitor of Tijd en Mens, another literary magazine. Because of its success the magazine evolved from a basic regional magazine to a well-known international art magazine. In 1955 De Meridiaan founded Galerie Taptoe, an artistic centrum, exhibition room and literary café in Brussels.
