= La Roue metro station =

Metro station in Brussels, Belgium

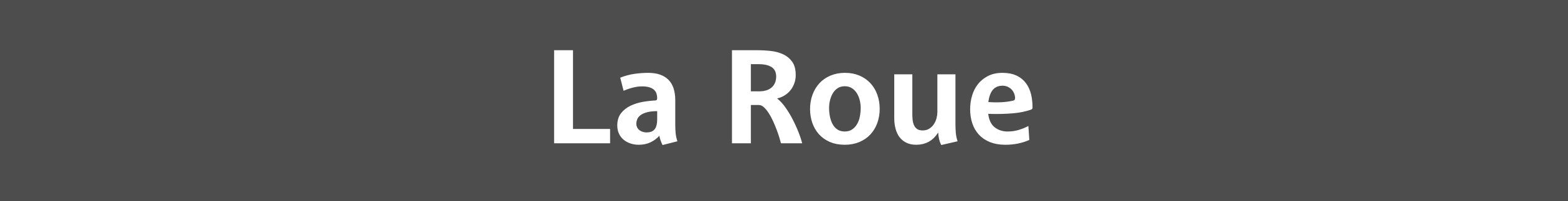
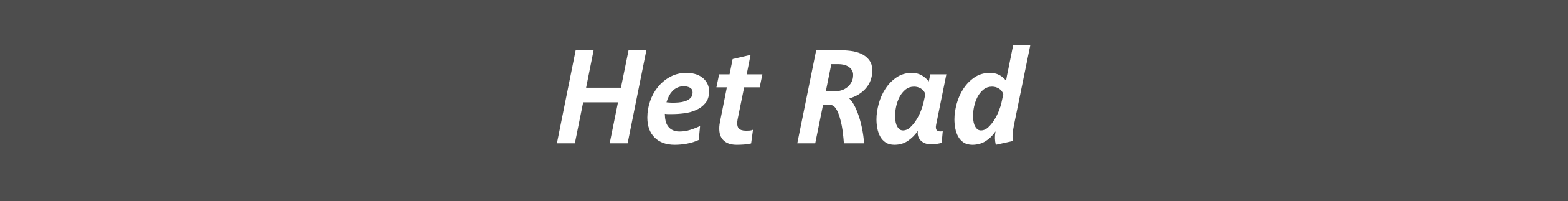

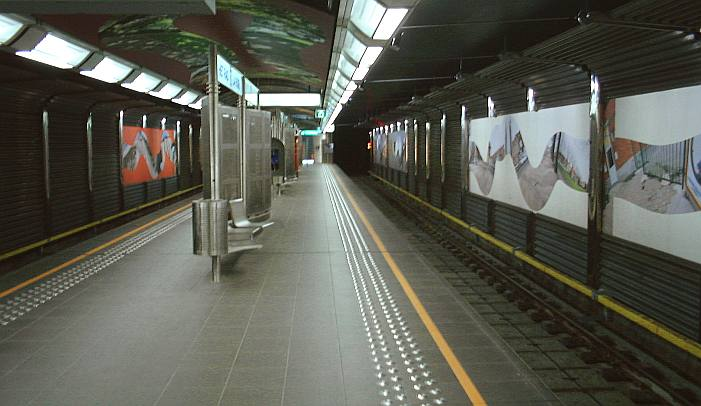
- La Roue/Het Rad metro station

General information
- Location: Chaussée de Mons / Bergense Steenweg; 1070 Anderlecht, Brussels-Capital Region, Belgium
- Coordinates: 50°49′15″N 4°17′37″E
- Owner: STIB/MIVB
- Platforms: 1 island platform
- Tracks: 2

Construction
- Structure type: Underground
- Accessible: Yes

History
- Opened: 15 September 2003; 22 years ago

Services
Preceding station	Brussels Metro	Following station
CERIA/COOVI towards Erasme/Erasmus	Line 5	Bizet towards Herrmann-Debroux
Location

La Roue (French, pronounced [la ʁu]) or Het Rad (Dutch, pronounced [ət ˈrɑt]) is a Brussels Metro station on the western branch of line 5. It is located in the municipality of Anderlecht, in the western part of Brussels, Belgium. The station serves the La Roue/Het Rad ("The Wheel") district, after which it is named.

The metro station opened on 15 September 2003 as part of the Bizet–Erasme/Erasmus extension of former line 1B, including the stations Erasme/Erasmus, Eddy Merckx and CERIA/COOVI. Then, following the reorganisation of the Brussels Metro on 4 April 2009, it is served by the extended east–west line 5.

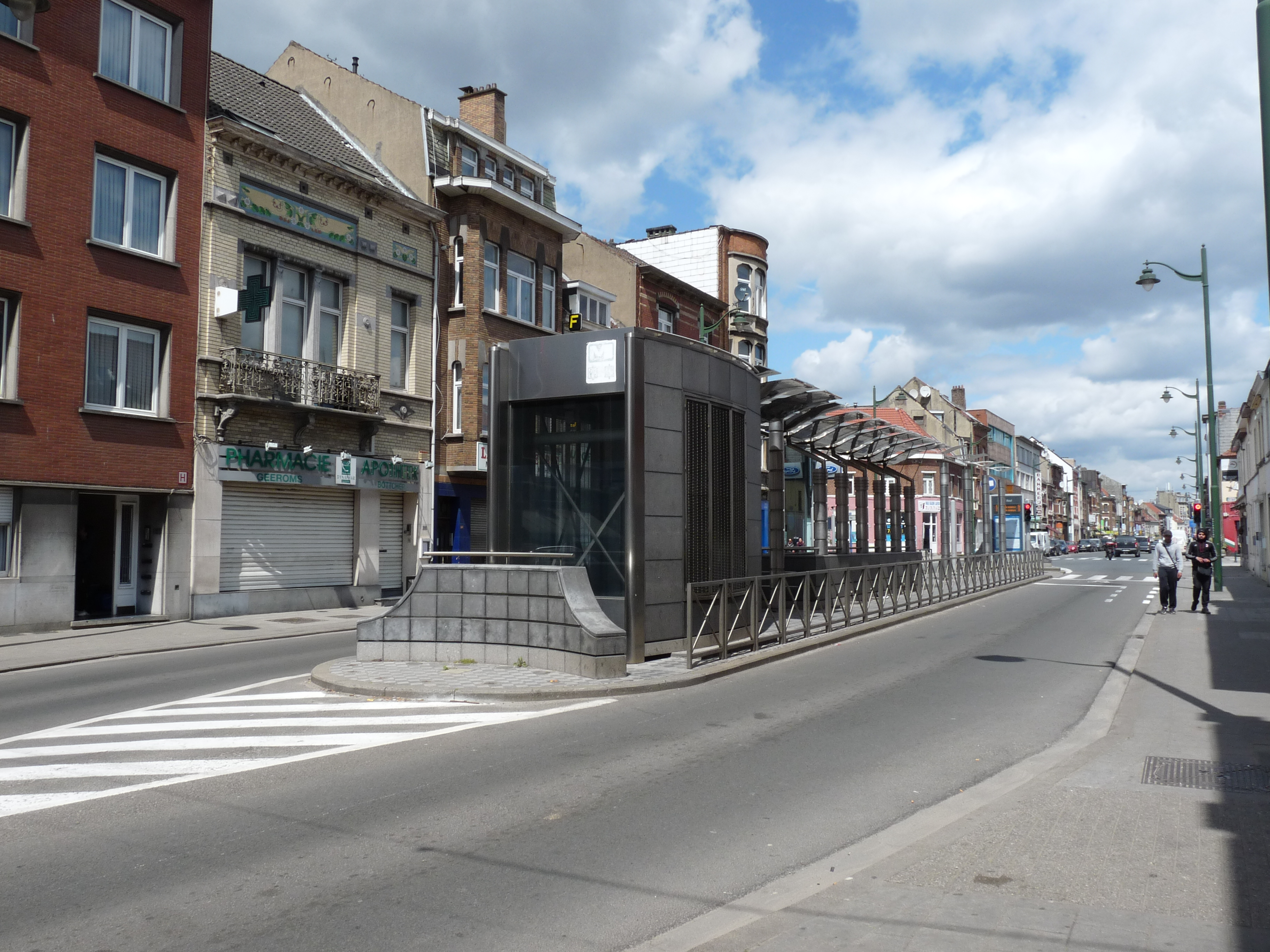
Entrance at street level

== See also ==
- Transport in Brussels
- History of Brussels
