= Erasmus metro station =

Metro station in Brussels, Belgium

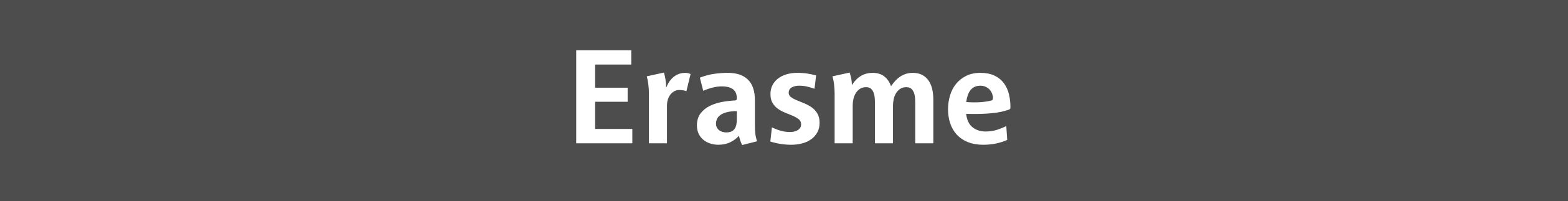
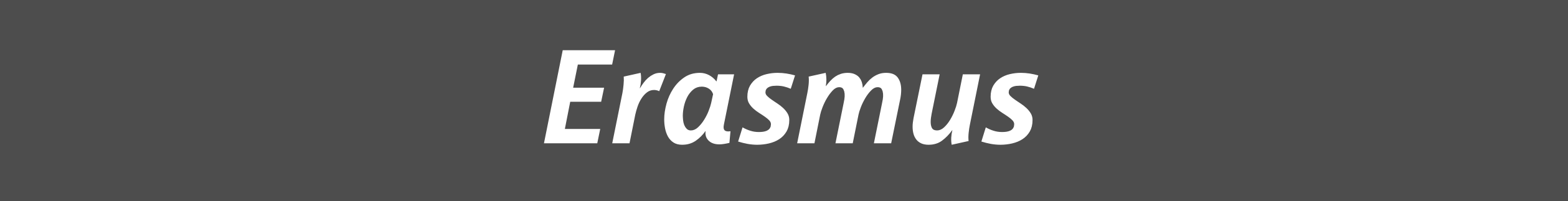

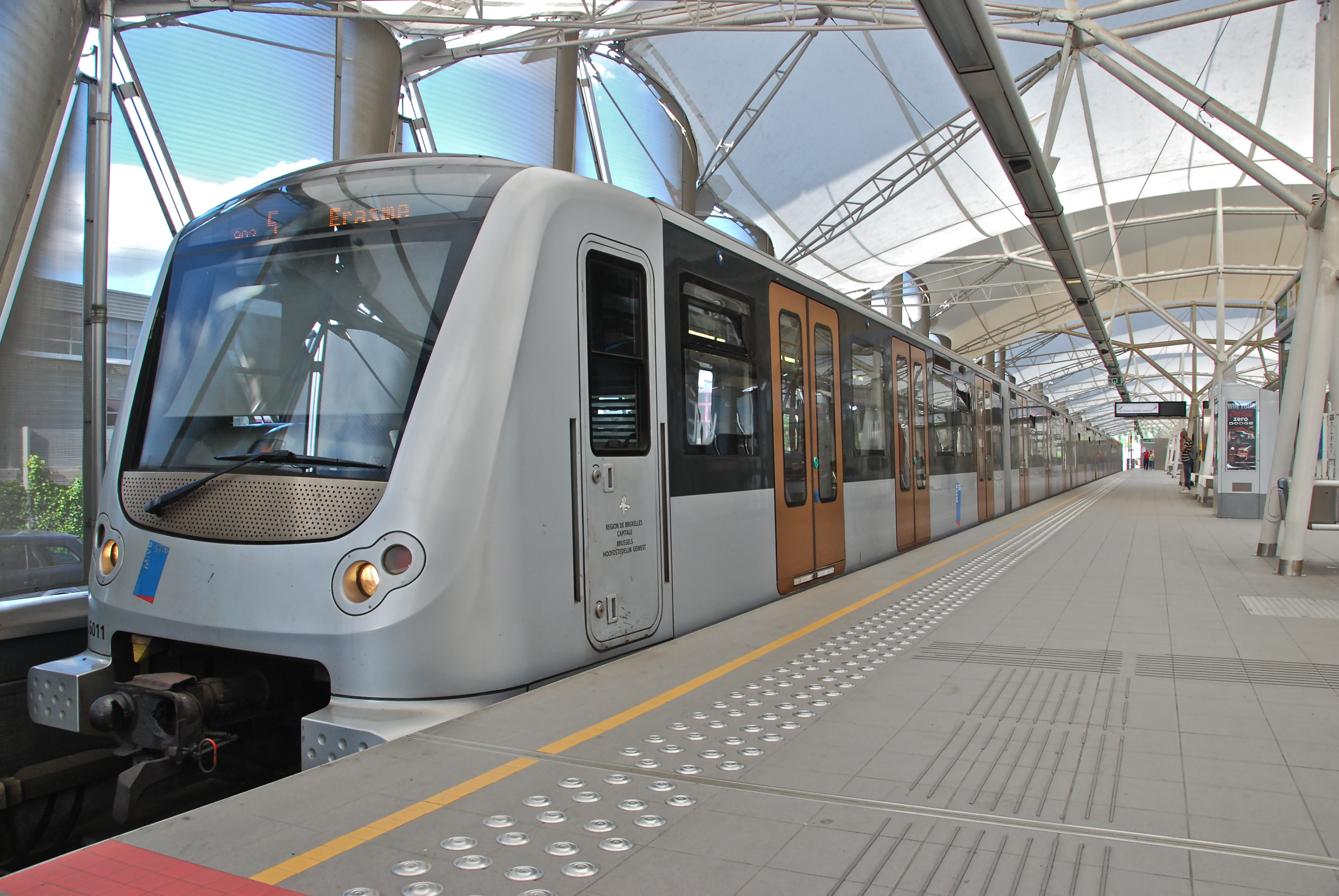
- Erasme/Erasmus metro station

General information
- Location: Route de Lennik / Lenniksebaan; 1070 Anderlecht, Brussels-Capital Region, Belgium
- Coordinates: 50°48′55″N 4°16′02″E
- Owner: STIB/MIVB
- Platforms: 1 island platform
- Tracks: 2

Construction
- Structure type: At grade
- Accessible: Yes

History
- Opened: 15 September 2003; 22 years ago

Services
Preceding station	Brussels Metro	Following station
Terminus	Line 5	Eddy Merckx towards Herrmann-Debroux
Location

Erasme (French, pronounced [eʁasm]) or Erasmus (Dutch, pronounced [eːˈrɑsmʏs]) is a Brussels Metro station serving as the western terminus of line 5. It is located in the municipality of Anderlecht, in the western part of Brussels, Belgium. The station was designed by Philippe Samyn and Partners and is named after Erasmus Hospital, which it serves. It lies at grade and has a single island platform, which can be reached through tunnels under the tracks.

The metro station opened on 15 September 2003 as part of the Bizet–Erasme/Erasmus extension of former line 1B, including the stations La Roue/Het Rad, CERIA/COOVI and Eddy Merckx. Then, following the reorganisation of the Brussels Metro on 4 April 2009, it is served by the extended east–west line 5.

In June 2021, the Brussels Intercommunal Transport Company (STIB/MIVB) launched its first M7 series trains into operation on line 1, leaving from Erasme/Erasmus station.

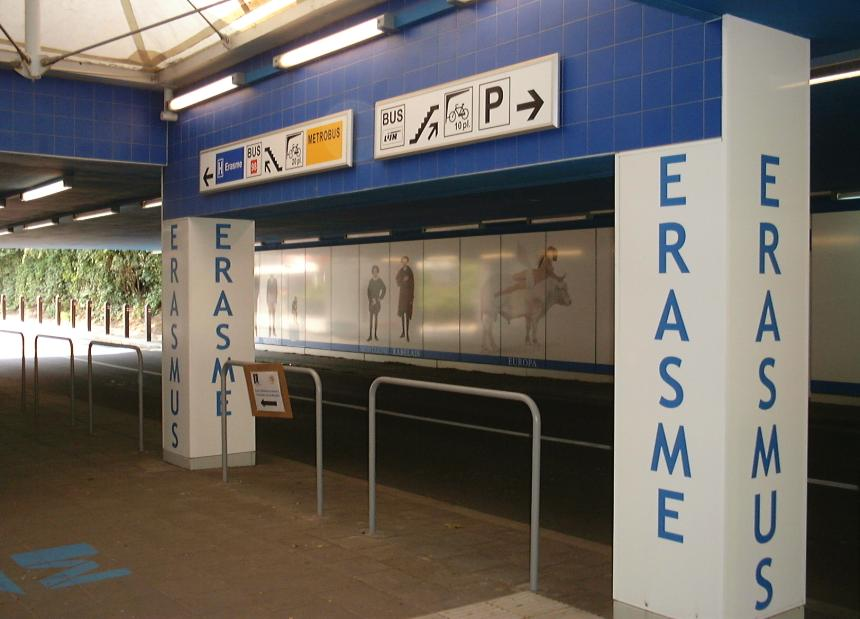
The entrance is from a street that goes under the station

== See also ==
- Transport in Brussels
- History of Brussels
