= Bizet metro station =

Metro station in Brussels, Belgium

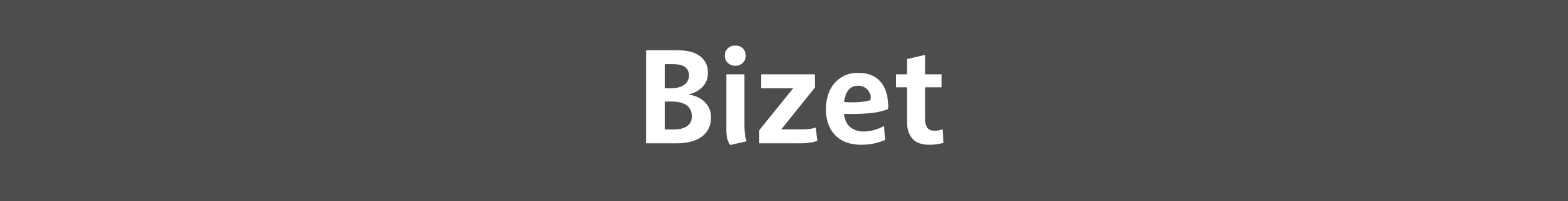

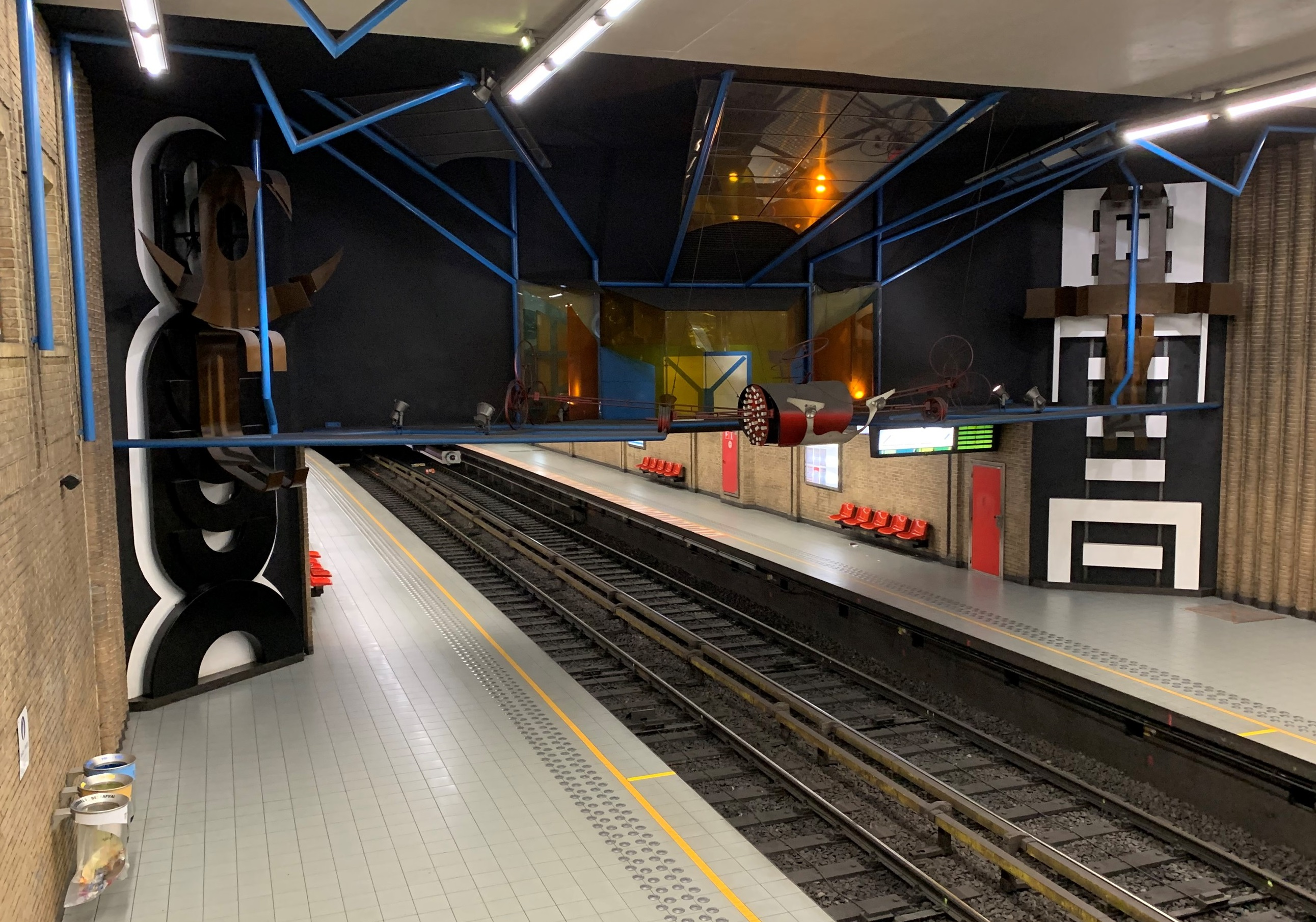
- Bizet metro station

General information
- Location: Place Bizet / Bizetplein; 1070 Anderlecht, Brussels-Capital Region, Belgium
- Coordinates: 50°49′30.6″N 4°17′52″E
- Owner: STIB/MIVB
- Platforms: 2
- Tracks: 2

Construction
- Structure type: Underground
- Accessible: Yes

History
- Opened: 10 January 1992; 34 years ago

Services
Preceding station	Brussels Metro	Following station
La Roue/Het Rad towards Erasme/Erasmus	Line 5	Veeweyde/Veeweide towards Herrmann-Debroux
Location

Bizet (French pronunciation: [bizɛ]) is a Brussels Metro station on the western branch of line 5. It is located in the municipality of Anderlecht, in the western part of Brussels, Belgium. The station received its name from the aboveground square Place Bizet/Bizetplein, itself named after the French classical music composer Georges Bizet.

The metro station opened on 10 January 1992, and until 2003, it was the western terminus of former line 1B. On 15 September 2003, a further extension from Bizet westwards to Erasme/Erasmus was opened. Then, following the reorganisation of the Brussels Metro on 4 April 2009, it is served by the extended east–west line 5.

== See also ==
- Transport in Brussels
- History of Brussels
