= Église chrétienne protestante française-allemande de Bruxelles =

The Église chrétienne protestante française-allemande de Bruxelles (the Franco-German Protestant Christian Church of Brussels) was the official name of Brussels Protestant Church from 1816 to 1830.

Following the Battle of Waterloo (1815), Brussels was the southern capital of the United Kingdom of the Netherlands under the House of Nassau-Orange. The congregation was attended by the Protestant William of Orange-Nassau.

At this time in Brussels besides this church there were two other Protestant congregations, both Dutch-speaking. From 1816 one of these met in the Temple of the Augustinians.

Following the pastorate of Jean-Pierre Charlier (1804–1822), and after a one-year vacancy, Genevan preacher of Le Reveil, Merle D'Aubigne, was called as pastor and served 1823–1830.

When D'Aubigné left in the wake of the Belgian revolution and independence of 1830, Chrétien-Henri Vent was appointed as successor.

In 1830, the Belgian state officially recognized the church as L'Église Protestante de Bruxelles (Brussels Protestant Church), a name it bears to the present day.
