= List of places of worship in Brussels =

In Brussels, there are numerous church buildings, most of which are attached to the Roman Catholic Church. The Brussels-Capital Region is home to 107 Catholic parishes. Other religious buildings in the region are also mentioned.

== By municipality ==
=== Anderlecht ===
Name	District	Coordinates	Denomination	Image
Holy Spirit Church	Anderlecht	50°49′38.3″N 4°17′3.92″E	Roman Catholic	
Mission House CICM Church	Anderlecht	50°50′49.72″N 4°18′18.41″E	Roman Catholic	
Church of Our Lady of the Assumption	Anderlecht	50°50′20.25″N 4°17′51.3″E	Roman Catholic	
Church of Our Lady of the Sacred Heart	Anderlecht	50°50′40.9″N 4°18′55.33″E	Roman Catholic	
Church of Our Lady of Joy	Anderlecht	50°48′56.38″N 4°17′0.57″E	Roman Catholic	
Church of St. Bernadette	Anderlecht	50°50′7.28″N 4°16′32.67″E	Roman Catholic	
Church of St. Gerard Majella	Neerpede, Anderlecht	50°49′34.77″N 4°16′37.18″E	Roman Catholic	
Church of St. Luke	Anderlecht	50°49′52.62″N 4°18′37.16″E	Roman Catholic	
Collegiate Church of St. Peter and St. Guido	Anderlecht	50°50′11.81″N 4°18′22.38″E	Roman Catholic	
Church of St. Joseph	La Roue/Het Rad, Anderlecht	50°49′22.16″N 4°17′50.26″E	Roman Catholic	
Church of Our Lady Immaculate Received	Cureghem/Kuregem, Anderlecht	50°50′34.94″N 4°20′7.03″E	Roman Catholic	
Israelite Orthodox Synagogue of Cureghem	Cureghem/Kuregem, Anderlecht		Judaism	
Bethlehem Church	Anderlecht		Protestantism	

=== Audergem/Oudergem ===
Name	District	Coordinates	Denomination	Image
Church of Our Lady of Blankedelle	Auderghem/Oudergem	50°48′23.38″N 4°26′15.27″E	Roman Catholic	
Church of St. Anne	Auderghem/Oudergem	50°48′57.25″N 4°26′1.41″E	Roman Catholic	
Church of St. Julien	Auderghem/Oudergem	50°49′16.3″N 4°24′34.77″E	Roman Catholic	

=== Berchem-Sainte-Agathe/Sint-Agatha-Berchem ===
Name	District	Coordinates	Denomination	Image
Old Church of St. Agatha	Berchem-Sainte-Agathe/Sint-Agatha-Berchem	50°51′48.92″N 4°17′42.97″E	Roman Catholic	
New Church of St. Agatha	Berchem-Sainte-Agathe/Sint-Agatha-Berchem	50°51′49″N 4°17′43″E	Roman Catholic	

=== City of Brussels ===
Name	District	Coordinates	Denomination	Image
Church of Our Lady of the Immaculate Conception	City of Brussels	50°50′15.06″N 4°20′43.06″E	Roman Catholic	
Church of Our Lady of Victories at the Sablon	City of Brussels	50°50′25.23″N 4°21′22.36″E	Roman Catholic	
Temple of the Augustinians (demolished)	City of Brussels	50°50′28.61″N 4°21′9.63″E	-	
Church of Our Lady of the Chapel	City of Brussels	50°50′29.5″N 4°21′4″E	Roman Catholic	
Church of Our Lady of the Rich Clares	City of Brussels	50°50′49.73″N 4°20′47.77″E	Roman Catholic	
Church of Our Lady of Good Help	City of Brussels	50°50′44.44″N 4°20′51.74″E	Roman Catholic	
Church of St. Catherine	City of Brussels	50°51′3.25″N 4°20′55.6″E	Roman Catholic	
Church of St. John the Baptist at the Béguinage	City of Brussels	50°51′10.01″N 4°21′2.05″E	Roman Catholic	
Church of St. John and St. Stephen of the Minimes	City of Brussels	50°50′21″N 4°21′10″E	Roman Catholic	
Church of St. Roch	City of Brussels	50°51′33.01″N 4°21′15.42″E	Roman Catholic	
Church of Our Lady of Finisterrae	City of Brussels	50°51′10.5″N 4°21′20.4″E	Roman Catholic	
Church of St. James on Coudenberg	City of Brussels	50°50′31″N 4°21′37″E	Roman Catholic	
Cathedral of St. Michael and St. Gudula	City of Brussels	50°50′52″N 4°21′36″E	Roman Catholic	
Church of St. Nicholas	City of Brussels	50°50′52.44″N 4°21′6.12″E	Roman Catholic	
Church of the Sacred Heart	City of Brussels	50°50′45.83″N 4°23′9.34″E	Roman Catholic	
Great Mosque of Brussels	City of Brussels	50°50′36″N 4°23′16″E	Islam	
Chapel of the Resurrection	City of Brussels	50°50′29″N 4°22′43″E	Oecumenical	
Protestant Church of Brussels	City of Brussels	50°51′4.71″N 4°20′40.07″E	Protestant	
Great Synagogue of Europe	City of Brussels	50°50′20″N 4°21′18″E	Judaism	
Mary Magdalene Church	City of Brussels	50°50′43.82″N 4°21′18.79″E	Roman Catholic	

=== Etterbeek ===
Name	District	Coordinates	Denomination	Image
Church of Our Lady of the Sacred Heart	Etterbeek	50°49′53.52″N 4°24′1.08″E	Roman Catholic	
Church of St. John Berchmans	Etterbeek	50°50′5″N 4°24′26″E	Roman Catholic	
Church of Our Lady Immaculate	Etterbeek	50°50′3.3″N 4°22′51.77″E	Roman Catholic	
Church of St. Anthony of Padua	Etterbeek	50°50′36.41″N 4°20′34.31″E	Roman Catholic	Photo Saint Antoine De Padoue
Church of St. Gertrude	Etterbeek	50°50′11.45″N 4°23′24.45″E	Roman Catholic	

=== Evere ===
Name	District	Coordinates	Denomination	Image
Church of Our Lady Immaculate Received	Evere	50°52′15.43″N 4°24′2.33″E	Roman Catholic	
Church of St. Joseph	Evere	50°51′31.58″N 4°24′53.43″E	Roman Catholic	
Church of St. Vincent	Evere	50°52′52.78″N 4°24′11.28″E	Roman Catholic	

=== Forest/Vorst ===
Name	District	Coordinates	Denomination	Image
Church of St. Mary Mother of God	Forest/Vorst	50°49′12.66″N 4°19′44.65″E	Roman Catholic	
Church of St. Curé d'Ars	Forest/Vorst	50°48′21.37″N 4°19′14.41″E	Roman Catholic	
Church of St. Pius X	Forest/Vorst	50°48′29.82″N 4°19′57.77″E	Roman Catholic	
Church of St. Anthony of Padua	Forest/Vorst	50°49′40.29″N 4°19′54.13″E	Roman Catholic	
Church of St. Augustine	Altitude Cent/Hoogte Honderd, Forest/Vorst	50°48′59.96″N 4°20′12.33″E	Roman Catholic	
Barnabites Church	Forest/Vorst	50°49′7.18″N 4°21′2.76″E	Roman Catholic	
Church of St. Denis	Forest/Vorst	50°48′40.11″N 4°19′3.84″E	Roman Catholic	

=== Ganshoren ===
Name	District	Coordinates	Denomination	Image
Church of St. Cecilia	Ganshoren	50°52′28.43″N 4°18′12.45″E	Roman Catholic	
Church of St. Martin	Ganshoren	50°52′19.83″N 4°18′52.81″E	Roman Catholic	

=== Haren ===
Name	District	Coordinates	Denomination	Image
Church of St. Elizabeth	Haren	50°53′34.1″N 4°25′2.87″E	Roman Catholic	

=== Ixelles/Elsene ===
Name	District	Coordinates	Denomination	Image
Church of St. Adrian	Ixelles/Elsene	50°48′36.34″N 4°23′23.81″E	Roman Catholic	Eglise Saint-adrien (Bruxelles)2
Church of the Holy Cross	Ixelles/Elsene	50°49′33.76″N 4°22′22.74″E	Roman Catholic	Eglise de la Sainte Croix (Ixelles)- Bruxelles
Pro-Cathedral of the Holy Trinity	Ixelles/Elsene	50°50′6.38″N 4°21′27.02″E	Anglican	
Church of the Holy Trinity	Ixelles/Elsene	50°49′30″N 4°21′29″E	Roman Catholic	
Church of Our Lady of the Annunciation	Ixelles/Elsene	50°49′1.07″N 4°21′14.47″E	Roman Catholic	
Carmelite Church	Ixelles/Elsene	50°50′8.89″N 4°21′24.55″E	Roman Catholic	
Church of the Fathers of the Blessed Sacrament	Ixelles/Elsene	50°50′8.56″N 4°22′24.49″E	Roman Catholic	
Church of Our Lady of the Cambre and St. Philip Neri	Ixelles/Elsene	50°49′7.33″N 4°22′30.27″E	Roman Catholic	
Church of St. Boniface	Ixelles/Elsene	50°50′7.51″N 4°21′56.24″E	Roman Catholic	
Cathedral Church of St. Nicholas the Wonderworker	Ixelles/Elsene	50°50′9.73″N 4°21′35.17″E	Russian Orthodoxy	
St. Andrew's Church	Ixelles/Elsene	50°49′19.6″N 4°21′59.11″E	Church of Scotland	

=== Jette ===
Name	District	Coordinates	Denomination	Image
Church of St. Clare	Jette	50°53′32.19″N 4°19′21.38″E	Roman Catholic	
Church of St. Joseph	Dielegem, Jette	50°53′11.58″N 4°19′9.35″E	Roman Catholic	
Church of St. Magdalene	Jette	50°52′19.85″N 4°19′24.07″E	Roman Catholic	
Church of Our Lady of Lourdes	Jette	50°52′23.8″N 4°20′7.26″E	Roman Catholic	
Church of St. Peter	Jette	50°52′49.37″N 4°19′49.92″E	Roman Catholic	

=== Koekelberg ===
Name	District	Coordinates	Denomination	Image
Basilica of the Sacred Heart	Koekelberg	50°52′1″N 4°19′1″E	Roman Catholic	Basilica of the Sacred Heart-3
Church of St. Anne	Koekelberg	50°51′37.36″N 4°19′55.25″E	Roman Catholic	

=== Laeken/Laken ===
Name	District	Coordinates	Denomination	Image
Church of Christ the King	Mutsaard, Laeken/Laken	50°53′56.54″N 4°21′48.61″E	Roman Catholic	
Church of St. Lambert	Heysel/Heizel, Laeken/Laken	50°53′26.6″N 4°20′38.13″E	Roman Catholic	
Church of the Holy Angels	Laeken/Laken	50°52′55.04″N 4°20′26.59″E	Roman Catholic	
Church of Our Lady of Laeken	Laeken/Laken	50°52′43″N 4°21′21″E	Roman Catholic	
Church of the Divine Child Jesus	Verregat, Laeken/Laken	50°53′50.62″N 4°19′42″E	Roman Catholic	

=== Molenbeek-Saint-Jean/Sint-Jans-Molenbeek ===
Name	District	Coordinates	Denomination	Image
Church of St. Barbara	Molenbeek-Saint-Jean/Sint-Jans-Molenbeek	50°50′59.08″N 4°19′41.5″E	Roman Catholic	
Church of St. John the Baptist	Molenbeek-Saint-Jean/Sint-Jans-Molenbeek	50°51′25.84″N 4°20′25.66″E	Roman Catholic	
Church of St. Remigius	Molenbeek-Saint-Jean/Sint-Jans-Molenbeek	50°51′46.07″N 4°20′18.45″E	Roman Catholic	
Church of Our Lady Mediatrix	Molenbeek-Saint-Jean/Sint-Jans-Molenbeek	50°51′18.6″N 4°20′39.27″E	Roman Catholic	
Church of St. Charles Borromeo and Good Herder	Karreveld-Mettewie, Molenbeek-Saint-Jean/Sint-Jans-Molenbeek	50°51′31.19″N 4°19′9.18″E	Roman Catholic	
Church of the Resurrection	Molenbeek-Saint-Jean/Sint-Jans-Molenbeek	50°50′52.11″N 4°17′21.62″E	Roman Catholic	

=== Neder-Over-Heembeek ===
Name	District	Coordinates	Denomination	Image
New Church of St. Peter and St. Paul	Neder-Over-Heembeek	50°53′45.97″N 4°23′16.85″E	Roman Catholic	

=== Saint Gilles/Saint-Gillis ===
Name	District	Coordinates	Denomination	Image
Jesus Worker Church	Saint Gilles/Sint-Gillis	50°49′35.15″N 4°20′16.4″E	Roman Catholic	
Church of St. Alena	Saint Gilles/Sint-Gillis	50°49′28.39″N 4°20′27.08″E	Roman Catholic	
Church of St. Bernard	Saint Gilles/Sint-Gillis	50°49′50.18″N 4°21′14.27″E	Roman Catholic	
Church of St. Gilles	Saint Gilles/Sint-Gillis	50°49′50.19″N 4°20′37.47″E	Roman Catholic	

=== Saint-Josse-ten-Node/Sint-Joost-ten-Node ===
Name	District	Coordinates	Denomination	Image
Church of St. Josse	Saint-Josse-ten-Node/Sint-Joost-ten-Node	50°51′0.58″N 4°22′28.26″E	Roman Catholic	Saint Judoc Church in Brussels

=== Schaerbeek/Schaarbeek ===
Name	District	Coordinates	Denomination	Image
Church of the Holy Family	Schaerbeek/Schaarbeek	50°52′25.93″N 4°23′12.07″E	Roman Catholic	Église de la Sainte-Famille (Schaerbeek)
Epiphany Church	Schaerbeek/Schaarbeek	50°51′38.12″N 4°24′11.54″E	Roman Catholic	
Saint Mary's Royal Church	Schaerbeek/Schaarbeek	50°51′32.73″N 4°22′7.58″E	Roman Catholic	
Church of St. Albert	Schaerbeek/Schaarbeek	50°50′59.38″N 4°23′41.08″E	Roman Catholic	
Church of St. Alice	Schaerbeek/Schaarbeek	50°51′18.32″N 4°23′6.73″E	Roman Catholic	
Church of St. Elizabeth	Schaerbeek/Schaarbeek	50°52′21.24″N 4°22′29.8″E	Rooms-katholiek	
Church of St. John and St. Nicholas	Schaerbeek/Schaarbeek	50°51′37.82″N 4°21′46.66″E	Roman Catholic	
Church of St. Servatius	Schaerbeek/Schaarbeek	50°51′51.77″N 4°22′21.37″E	Roman Catholic	
Church of St. Susanna	Schaerbeek/Schaarbeek	50°51′57.13″N 4°23′20.55″E	Roman Catholic	
Church of St. Teresa of Ávila	Schaerbeek/Schaarbeek	50°51′21.6″N 4°23′43.44″E	Roman Catholic	
Bethel Church	Schaerbeek/Schaarbeek	50°52′03.6″N 4°22′40.2″E	Evangelical	
Church of the Divine Saviour	Schaerbeek/Schaarbeek	50°50′58.74″N 4°24′28.96″E	Roman Catholic	

=== Uccle/Ukkel ===
Name	District	Coordinates	Denomination	Image
Church of the Precious Blood	Uccle/Ukkel	50°47′42.79″N 4°20′12.28″E	Roman Catholic	
Church of St. Job	Carloo, Uccle/Ukkel	50°47′38.24″N 4°22′0.41″E	Roman Catholic	
Church of the Sacred Heart	Uccle/Ukkel	50°48′48.37″N 4°20′44.81″E	Roman Catholic	
Church of Our Lady of Consolation	Uccle/Ukkel	50°47′12.58″N 4°19′49.47″E	Roman Catholic	
Church of St. Paul	Uccle/Ukkel	50°47′53.7″N 4°19′23.12″E	Roman Catholic	
Church of St. Joseph	Uccle/Ukkel	50°46′42.85″N 4°20′33.8″E	Roman Catholic	
Church of Our Lady of the Rosary	Uccle/Ukkel	50°48′36.12″N 4°22′3.93″E	Roman Catholic	
Church of St. Anne	Uccle/Ukkel	50°46′46.62″N 4°21′55.04″E	Roman Catholic	
Church of St. Mark	Uccle/Ukkel	50°48′16.77″N 4°21′21.27″E	Roman Catholic	
Church of St. Peter	Uccle/Ukkel	50°48′12.67″N 4°20′23.17″E	Roman Catholic	

=== Watermael-Boitsfort/Watermaal-Bosvoorde ===
Name	District	Coordinates	Denomination	Image
Church of Our Lady of Perpetual Help	Watermael-Boitsfort/Watermaal-Bosvoorde	50°48′30.97″N 4°25′3.97″E	Roman Catholic	
Church of St. Clement	Watermael-Boitsfort/Watermaal-Bosvoorde	50°48′35.93″N 4°24′20.96″E	Roman Catholic	
Church of the Holy Cross	Watermael-Boitsfort/Watermaal-Bosvoorde	50°48′1.03″N 4°23′57.62″E	Roman Catholic	
Queen of Heaven Church	Watermael-Boitsfort/Watermaal-Bosvoorde	50°47′24.02″N 4°25′18.71″E	Roman Catholic	
Church of St. Hubert	Watermael-Boitsfort/Watermaal-Bosvoorde	50°47′46.8″N 4°24′50.44″E	Roman Catholic	St. Hubert Church, Watermael-Boitsfort

=== Woluwe-Saint-Lambert/Sint-Lambrechts-Woluwe ===
Name	District	Coordinates	Denomination	Image
Church of Our Lady of the Assumption	Kapelleveld, Woluwe-Saint-Lambert/Sint-Lambrechts-Woluwe	50°50′52.91″N 4°27′4.08″E	Roman Catholic	
Chapel of Mary the Miserable	Woluwe-Saint-Lambert/Sint-Lambrechts-Woluwe	50°50′46″N 4°26′31.99″E	Roman Catholic	
Church of the Holy Family	Woluwe-Saint-Lambert/Sint-Lambrechts-Woluwe	50°51′0.51″N 4°25′38.58″E	Roman Catholic	
Church of St. Henry	Woluwe-Saint-Lambert/Sint-Lambrechts-Woluwe	50°50′31.37″N 4°24′35.7″E	Roman Catholic	
Church of St. Lambert	Woluwe-Saint-Lambert/Sint-Lambrechts-Woluwe	50°50′29.04″N 4°25′59.13″E	Roman Catholic	

=== Woluwe-Saint-Pierre/Sint-Pieters-Woluwe ===
Name	District	Coordinates	Denomination	Image
Church of St. Paul	Woluwe-Saint-Pierre/Sint-Pieters-Woluwe	50°49′47.76″N 4°26′51.08″E	Roman Catholic	
Church of St. Peter	Woluwe-Saint-Pierre/Sint-Pieters-Woluwe	50°50′17.78″N 4°25′54.26″E	Roman Catholic	
Church of Our Lady of Stockel	Woluwe-Saint-Pierre/Sint-Pieters-Woluwe	50°50′28.61″N 4°27′46″E	Roman Catholic	
Church of St. Alice	Woluwe-Saint-Pierre/Sint-Pieters-Woluwe	50°49′41.38″N 4°27′44.32″E	Roman Catholic	
Church of Our Lady of Grace	Woluwe-Saint-Pierre/Sint-Pieters-Woluwe	50°49′37.38″N 4°25′7.43″E	Roman Catholic	
