= Belliard =

Belliard is a surname. Notable people with the name include:

- Augustin Daniel Belliard (1769–1832), French general
- David Belliard (born 1978), French journalist and politician
- Michel Belliard (born 1949), French boxer
- Rafael Belliard (born 1969), Dominican baseball player and coach
- Ronnie Belliard (born 1979), American baseball player

== See also ==
- Édouard Béliard (1832–1912), French Impressionist painter
- Robert Béliard (1912–1993), French racing cyclist
- Rue Belliard, a street in Brussels, Belgium
  - L'Église de la rue Belliard, a Brussels-based evangelical Protestant congregation
