= Temple de l'Observatoire =

Belgian Protestant Christian church

The Temple de l'Observatoire (Temple of the Observatory) was a Protestant Christian church in Brussels, started in 1834 when a group left Brussels Protestant Church and called French Methodist missionary, Philippe Boucher (1811–1885), to serve as their pastor. This was because they preferred "evangelical, saving, pious" preaching to the "rationalistic" and "cool and academic" ministry of pastor Chrétien-Henri Vent.

== History ==
The church initially met in hired premises on rue Verte (now rue de Bréderode), before, in 1837, with the help of funding from the USA, constructing their own place of worship on boulevard de l'Observatoire (now boulevard Bisschoffsheim) near to Schaerbeek_Gate: the Temple de l'Observatoire. 'Mr. Boucher's Chapel' was at the time only the second dedicated place of Protestant worship in Brussels (the other being on Place du Musée), the first building in neo-gothic style built in Belgium and at one time was the oldest surviving building on the boulevard Bischoffsheim. Its name was inspired by its proximity to the Brussels Observatory which stood on the site which is now Square H. Frick.

The second pastor was the Swiss preacher, Léonard Anet, who served 1843–1860.

Over the years famous members/adherents at the Temple included Charles Lagrange, professor at the military academy and author of works on the subject of the Bible and science, Jacques de Lalaing, a sculptor and painter, and, for some time, General Gallet, aide-de-camp to King Albert I.

In 1836 the Belgian Evangelical Society was formed and in 1849 this was reorganised into a denomination, the Belgian Christian Missionary Church (L'église Chrétienne Missionaire Belge), along presbyterian lines and adhering to the 1561 Belgic Confession. The Observatoire joined the denomination in 1853.

In 1837 a Calvinist-minded group broke away from the more Wesleyan-oriented church to form L’Église de la rue Belliard). The two congregations reunited (1858, 1890) and separated again (1871, 1917) on more than one occasion, before finally reuniting in 1973 as Brussels Botanique Protestant church (l’église Protestante de Bruxelles-Botanique).

Around 1974 the difficult decision was taken to demolish the Temple (dating back to 1837) and the new Temple du Botanique was constructed on the same spot and dedicated in 1977, where the church meets to this day.

Brussels Botanique Protestant church is now part of the United Protestant Church in Belgium denomination.

== Ministers ==
Succession of ministers at the Temple:

- 1834–1843 Philippe Boucher (F)
- 1836–1837 Denis Lourde-Laplace
- 1843–1869 Léonard Anet (CH)
- 1857–1870 Eugène Filhol
- 1871–1873 Philippe Boucher (F) (for the second time)
- 1873–1874 Adolphe DESQUARTIERS
- 1875–1885 James Hocart (son)
- 1885–1889 A. Legros
- 1890–1895 Rodolphe Meyhoffer
- 1895–1900 Auguste Rivier
- 1900–1919 Edmond Durand
- 1919–1922 Henri Anet
- 1922–1924 Kennedy Anet
- 1924–1930 Oswald Michotte (BE)
- 1930–1931 Kennedy ANET
- 1931–1946 Raoul BORDARIER
- 1946–1949 Fernand BARTH
- 1947–1948 Emile JEQUIER
- 1948–1961 Albert DE HALLER
- 1961–1966 Bernard ROBERT
- 1966–1971 Bernard COVIAUX
- 1972- Wilfred HOYOIS (consulent)
