= Robert Carter (American publisher) =

American publisher (1807–1889)

Robert Carter (November 2, 1807 – December 28, 1889) was a Scottish-born American bookseller and publisher who founded the New York publishing company Robert Carter & Brothers. He specialized in publishing Protestant religious literature and was a prominent, nineteenth-century publisher of theological, devotional and works for children. Historian Peter Ross described Carter as having been the leading publisher of orthodox religious literature in New York City.

== Early life ==
Carter was born in Earlston, Berwickshire, Scotland, on November 2, 1807. He was the son of Thomas and Agnes (née Ewing) Carter. His father was a weaver, and Carter left formal schooling as a child to work at the loom. He continued his education independently, studying Latin and Greek with the assistance of a cousin.

As a young man Carter became a teacher. He operated a school in Earlston and later taught at Peebles. He attended the University of Edinburgh for one session before emigrating to the United States in 1831. After arriving in New York City, he worked as a teacher, including as a classical instructor.

== Publishing career ==
In 1834 Carter established a bookstore at Canal and Laurens streets in New York, where he both published and sold books. His first publishing venture was an American edition of William Symington's The Atonement and Intercession of Jesus Christ, that was used by seminary students at Princeton Theological Seminary. The book established Carter within the market for evangelical religious literature.

A significant early success followed Carter's American publication of Jean-Henri Merle d'Aubigné's History of the Reformation of the Sixteenth Century. Carter's edition sold more than 50,000 copies.

In 1848 Carter 's younger brothers Peter and Walter Carter became partners and the publishing company was renamed Robert Carter & Brothers. The firm moved to 258 Broadway and in 1856 relocated to Broadway and Spring Street, where it remained for the rest of Carter's life. The firm's publications included theology, biblical commentary, devotional literature, biography, history, and books for children and young people. Its publishing series included the Carter's Cabinet Library and Fireside Library.

In 1884, on the fiftieth anniversary of Carter's entry into the book trade, representatives of thirty-five New York bookselling and publishing firms presented him with a congratulatory address recognizing his long career in the industry.

== Religious and civic activities ==
In 1856 Carter became a manager of the American Bible Society and shortly afterward joined its Committee of Publication. He was elected one of the society's vice-presidents in 1878.

His publishing work was closely associated with the Presbyterian and broader evangelical communities of nineteenth-century New York. The Biographical Register of the Saint Andrew's Society of the State of New York later recalled that Carter was widely known in the city's religious community and noted his reputation among authors and fellow booksellers.

== Notable published authors ==
Notable authors published by Robert Carter includes James McCosh, C. H. Spurgeon, Horatius Bonar, Robert Murray M'Cheyne, and David Brewster.

== Later life and death ==
Carter remained connected with the publishing business into his old age. He died in New York City on December 28, 1889, aged 82, and was buried at Green-Wood Cemetery in Brooklyn.

Robert Carter & Brothers ceased business following his death. The firm's stock and printing plates were sold at auction in 1890.

== Legacy ==
Carter's career coincided with the expansion of religious publishing in the United States during the nineteenth century. His firm was associated with the American circulation of British and Scottish evangelical literature and with books intended for Presbyterian and other Protestant readers.

Ross emphasized both his prominence in New York religious publishing and his willingness to undertake publishing projects on his own judgement. Carter was also given a separate entry in The Biographical Dictionary of America, which traced his development from Scottish schoolteacher to New York publisher.

In 1891 Annie Carter Cochran published Robert Carter: His Life and Work, 1807–1889, a book-length biography.
