= Church of Our Lady of Victories at the Sablon =

Church in Brussels, Belgium

Church of Our Lady of the Sablon
- Église Notre-Dame du Sablon (French); Onze-Lieve-Vrouw ter Zavelkerk (Dutch)
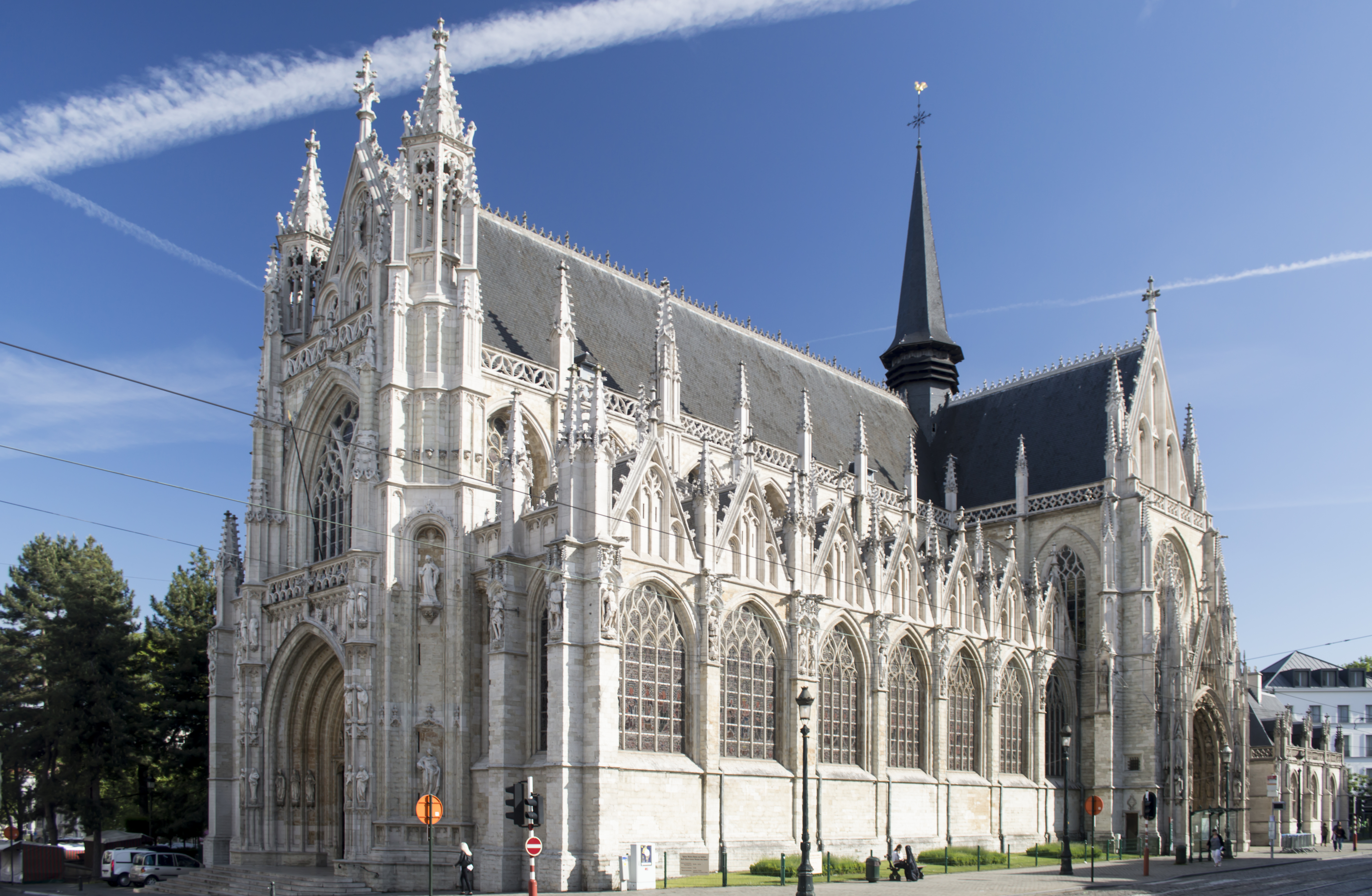
- Our Lady of the Sablon Church
- Church of Our Lady of the Sablon
- 50°50′25.23″N 4°21′22.36″E
- Location: Rue des Sablons / Zavelstraat; 1000 City of Brussels, Brussels-Capital Region
- Country: Belgium
- Denomination: Catholic Church

History
- Status: Parish church
- Founded: c. 13th century
- Dedication: Our Lady of the Sablon

Architecture
- Functional status: Active
- Heritage designation: Protected
- Designated: 05/03/1936
- Architectural type: Church
- Style: Gothic; Brabantine Gothic; Baroque; Gothic Revival
- Completed: 15th century

Specifications
- Width: 24 m (78 ft 9 in)
- Height: 65 m (213 ft 3 in)

Administration
- Archdiocese: Mechelen–Brussels

Clergy
- Archbishop: Luc Terlinden (Primate of Belgium)

The Church of Our Lady of Victories at the Sablon (French: Église Notre-Dame des Victoires au Sablon; Dutch: Onze-Lieve-Vrouw ter Zege op de Zavelkerk), or the Church of Our Lady of the Sablon (French: Église Notre-Dame du Sablon; Dutch: Onze-Lieve-Vrouw ter Zavelkerk), is a Catholic church in the Sablon/Zavel district of Brussels, Belgium. It is dedicated to Our Lady of the Sablon.

Built in the 15th century, the church was patronised by the nobility and wealthy citizens of Brussels, and is characterised by its late Brabantine Gothic exterior and rich interior decoration including two Baroque chapels. Its neo-Gothic decorative elements date from the 19th century. The complex was designated a historic monument in 1936.

The church is located along the Rue de la Régence/Regentschapsstraat, halfway between the Place Royale/Koningsplein and the Palace of Justice, not far for the Royal Museums of Fine Arts and across the street from the Square du Petit Sablon/Kleine Zavelsquare.

== History ==
=== Origins ===
The origin of the church goes back to the early 13th century when Henry I, Duke of Brabant, recognised the Noble Serment of Crossbowmen as a guild and granted them certain privileges, including the right to use a plot at the Sablon/Zavel (a piece of sandy clay land outside the city walls) as an exercise ground. Nearly a century later, in 1304, the Guild of the brothers and sisters of St. John's Hospital (French: Hôpital Saint-Jean, Dutch: Sint-Jansgasthuis) ceded to the Crossbowmen's Guild an area adjacent to the Sablon where the guild proceeded to build a modest chapel dedicated to Our Lady. This chapel became that of the Crossbowmen's Guild.

Legend has is that the chapel became famous after a local devout woman named Beatrijs Soetkens had a vision in which the Virgin Mary instructed her to steal the miraculous statue of Onze-Lieve-Vrouw op 't Stocxken ("Our Lady on the Little Stick") in Antwerp, bring it to Brussels, and place it in the chapel of the Crossbowmen's Guild. The woman stole the statue, and through a series of miraculous events, was able to transport it to Brussels by boat in 1348. It was then solemnly placed in the chapel and venerated as the guild's patron. The guild also promised to hold an annual procession, carrying the image throughout Brussels. This developed into the Ommegang, an important religious and civil event in Brussels' calendar, held on the Sunday before Pentecost.

=== Construction ===
Construction of the church, which replaced the chapel, is generally believed to have started around 1400. The whole construction process took about a century. The choir was finished in 1435, as testified by murals from that date. Work was interrupted because of the troubles after the death of Charles the Bold in 1477, but restarted by the end of the century. The nave was built with seven bays, the last two of which should have been surmounted by towers but were never completed. The sacrarium built behind the choir dates from 1549.

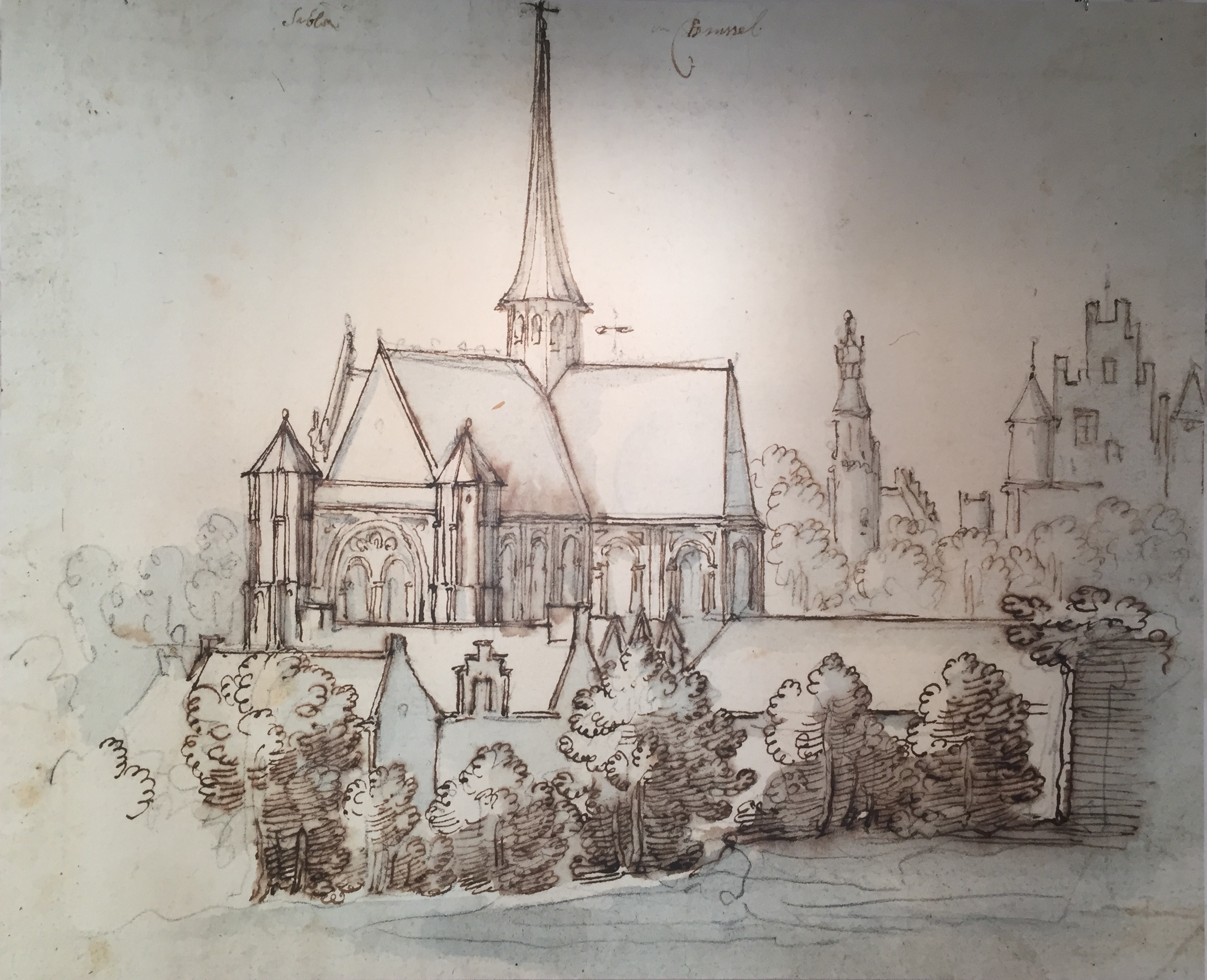
The Church of the Sablon, c. 1612, as drawn by Remigio Cantagallina

At the end of the 16th century, the church was sacked by Calvinists and the Virgin's statue that Beatrijs Soetkens had brought was destroyed. In the 17th century, the prominent family of Thurn und Taxis, whose residence was located almost opposite the church's southern entrance, had two chapels built inside it: the Chapel of St. Ursula (1651–1676) to the north of the choir, started by the Flemish sculptor-architect Lucas Faydherbe and completed by Vincent Anthony; and the Chapel of St. Marculf (1690), situated south of the choir.

At the beginning of the French occupation in 1795, the church was saved from the anti-religious zeal of the occupiers and their supporters as the priest swore allegiance to the Republic. The church remained closed for a few years and was returned to religious service under Napoleon, as a subsidiary of the Church of Our Lady of the Chapel.

=== Renovation ===
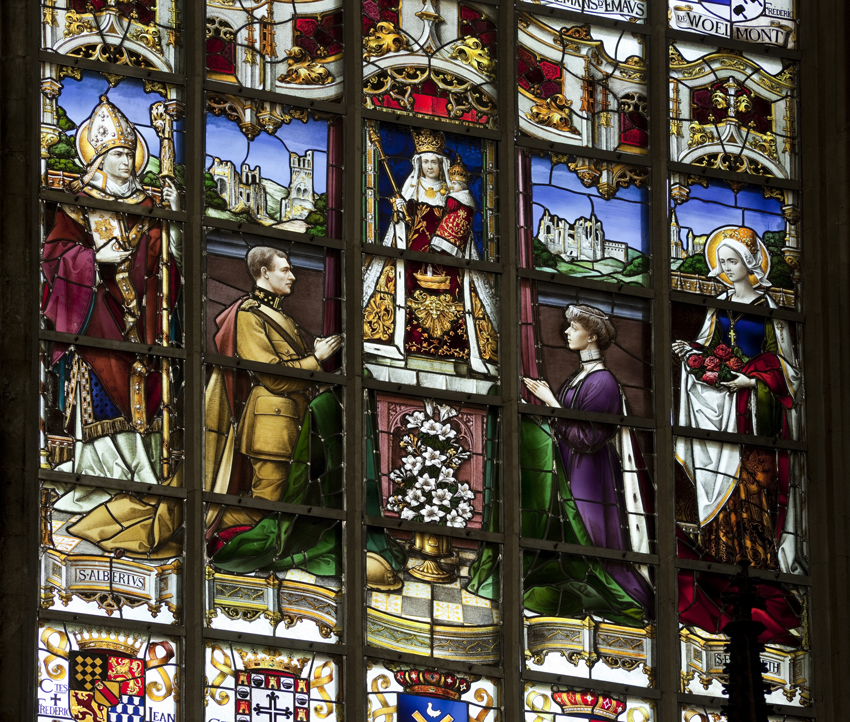
Window depicting King Albert I and Queen Elisabeth praying to Our Lady of the Sablon

Soon after the completion of the final section of the Rue de la Régence/Regentschapsstraat in 1872, structures built against the church were removed. The church appeared so dilapidated after this removal that restoration works were launched immediately.

The first works were entrusted, in 1870, to the local architect Auguste Schoy. He proposed a restoration project that was so radical that the Commission of Monuments at first refused to endorse it because it was considered too fanciful. Schoy's intervention was restricted to rather modest works: rehabilitation of the side aisles on the Rue de la Régence; reopening of the pointed arch windows on the side of the Rue des Sablons/Zavelstraat, which had been walled up in the 18th century for the installation of organs; and replacing the rose window of the north portal with a pointed arch window.

The site was then entrusted to the architect Jules-Jacques Van Ysendyck and then to his son Maurice. Jules-Jacques Van Ysendyck was a disciple of Eugène Viollet-le-Duc and led the work in accordance with the latter's principle of unity of style. From 1895 to 1912, he and his son implemented six construction phases by which they created a monument that had never existed. They added turrets, pinnacles and openwork balustrades, covered the aisles with perpendicular gables instead of the continuous gables parallel to the nave, and built buttresses with pinnacles.

From 1917 to 1937, the architect François Malfait directed the placement of 57 statues by 27 different sculptors. The church was designated a historic monument on 5 March 1936. More recently, the City of Brussels undertook a global restoration to bring back the church to its former glory. The entire restoration lasted fourteen years.

== Description ==
Most of the church is in the Brabantine Gothic style, although some parts are in the newer Baroque style. It is traditionally listed, alongside the Cathedral of St. Michael and St. Gudula and the Church of Our Lady of the Chapel, as one of the three Gothic churches still standing in central Brussels.

The church is built of stone from the Gobertange quarry, which is located in present-day Walloon Brabant, approximately 45 km (28 mi) south-east of the church's site.

Main façade and portal

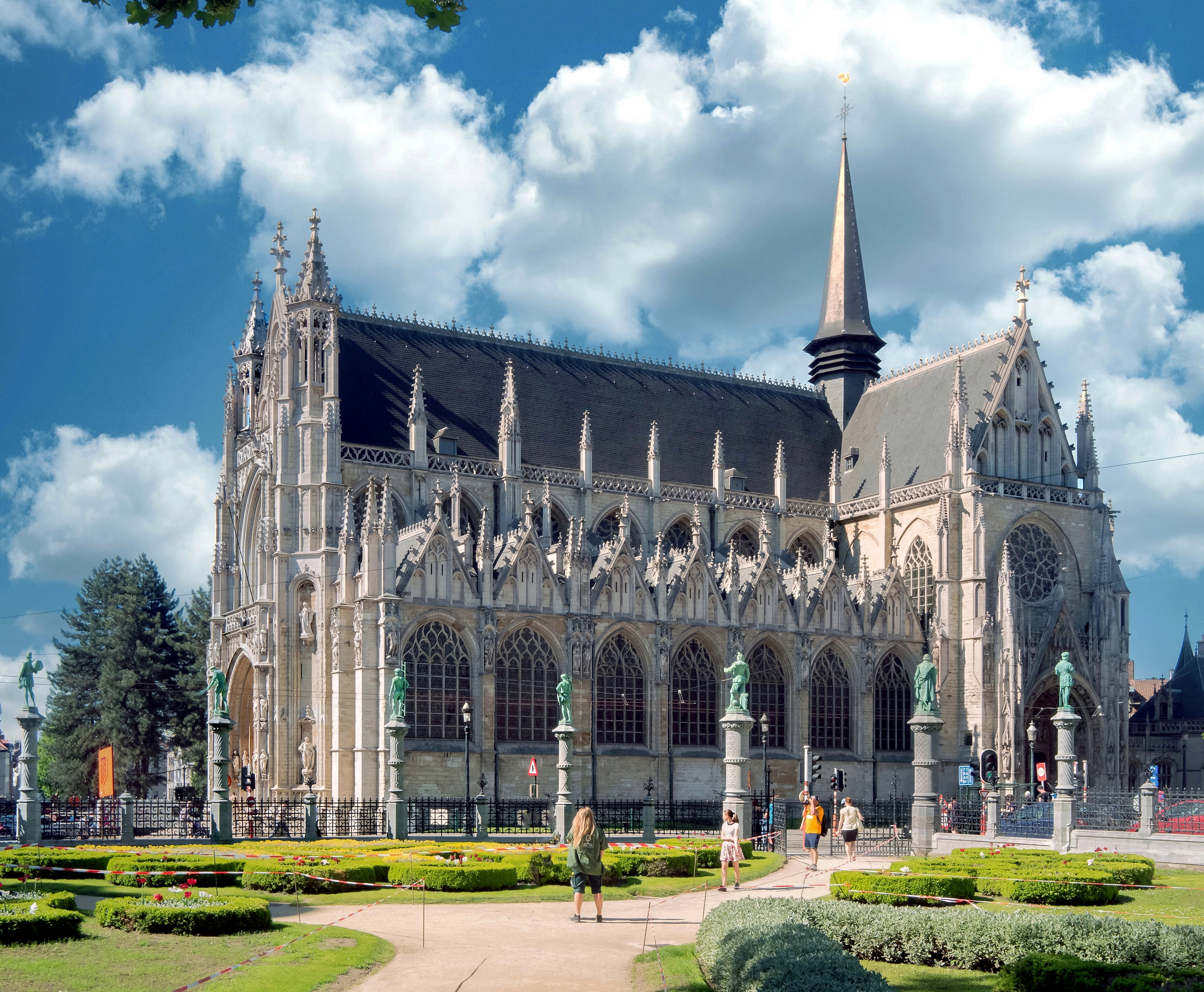
Lateral view

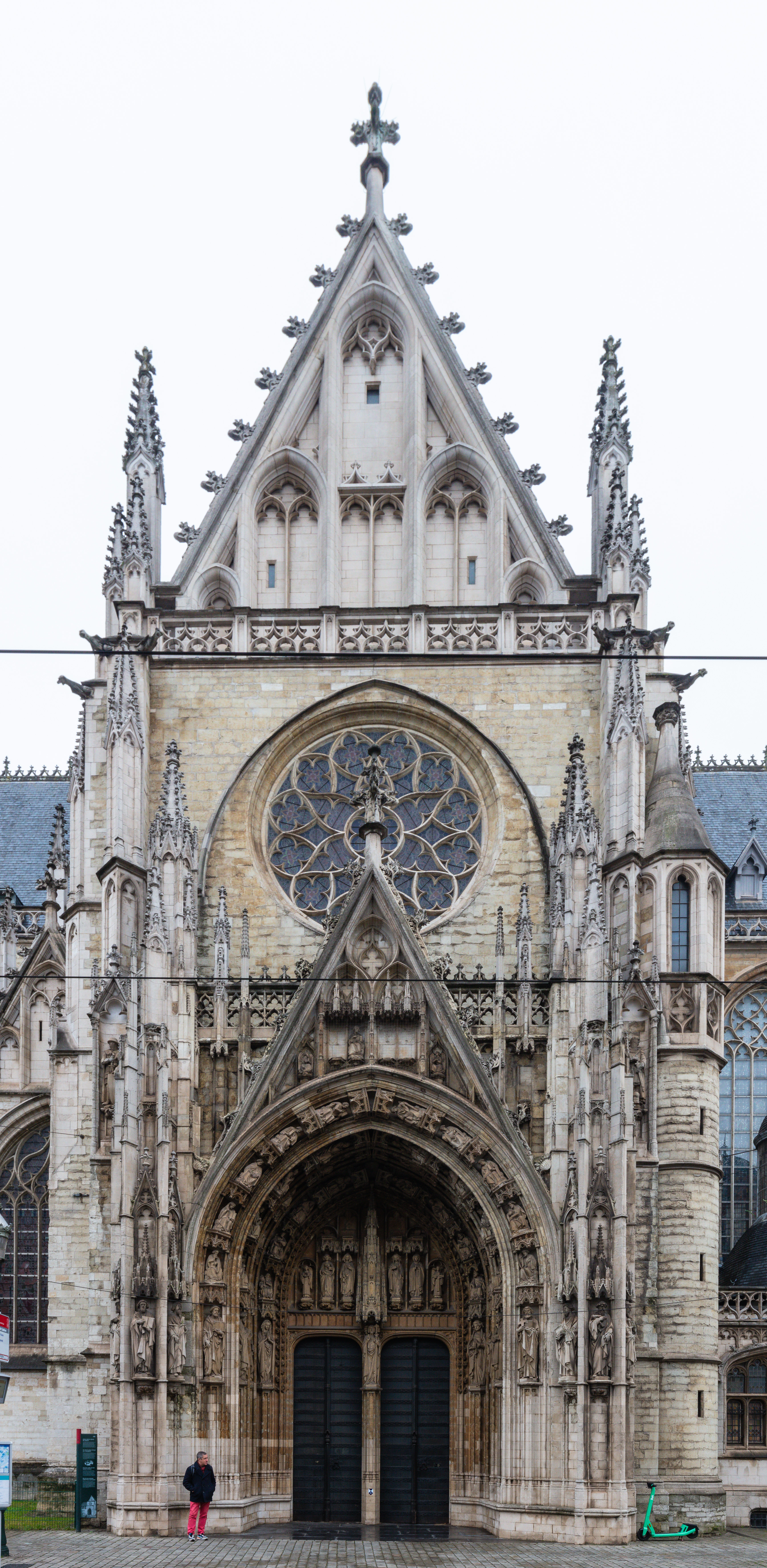
Side portal

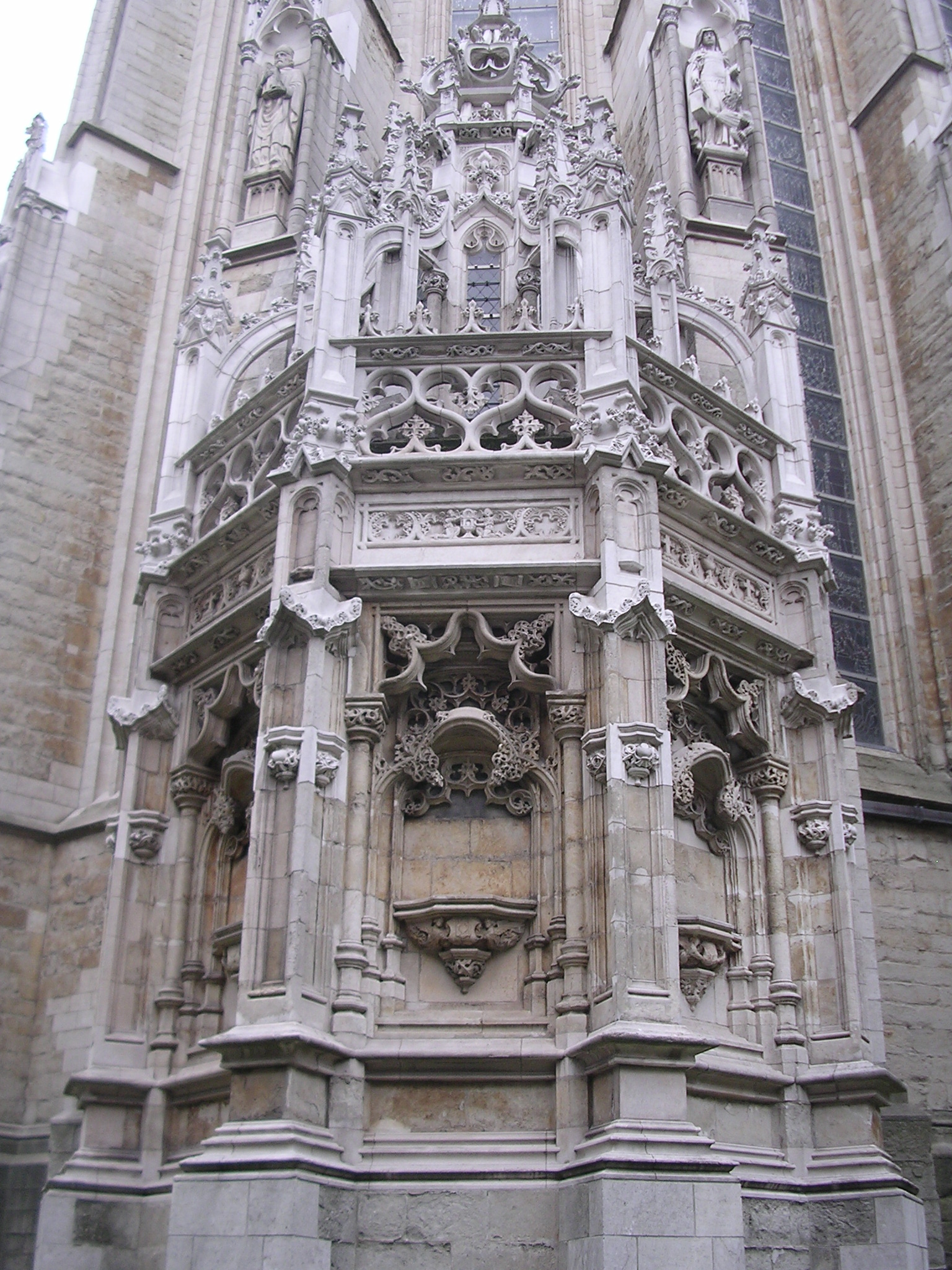
External view of the sacrarium

== Interior ==
=== Nave and choir ===
Striking features of the nave are the pillars that have no capital, contributing to the verticalising effect. The columns of the nave hold twelve statues of apostles, dating from the mid-17th century, which were sculpted by some of the leading Baroque sculptors of that time. The triforium is remarkable for its rhythmic vesica piscis motifs.

The polychrome murals in the choir date from the first half of the 15th century. There is a triptych of the Flemish painter Michiel Coxie on The Resurrection of Christ, as well as a Beheading of Barbara, formerly attributed to Erasmus Quellinus, but now attributed to Gaspar de Crayer. The stained glass windows are relatively recent and largely the work of the artists Samuel Coucke, Louis-Charles Crespin and Jacques Colpaert.

The Baroque pulpit is a work of Marc de Vos, executed in 1697 for the Temple of the Augustinians in Brussels, which no longer exists. It is decorated with medallions of Saint Thomas Aquinas, the Virgin Mary and Saint Thomas of Villanova. The base on which the pulpit rests is formed by four sculptures symbolising the Four Evangelists: the angel (Matthew), the eagle (John), the lion (Mark) and the ox (Luke).

The church houses several Baroque funeral monuments. It also holds other treasures such as the reliquary with the bones of Saint Wivina.

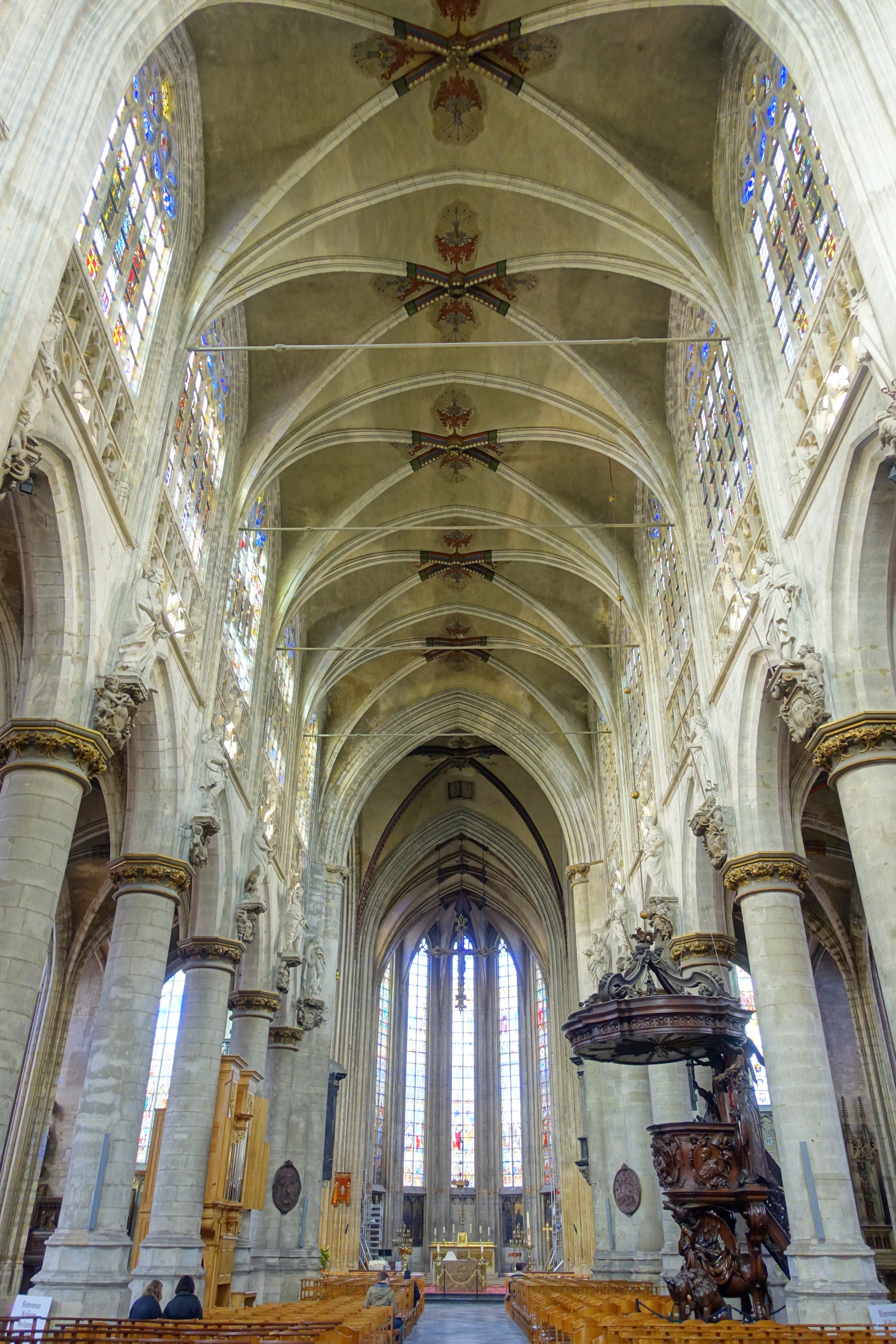
The nave

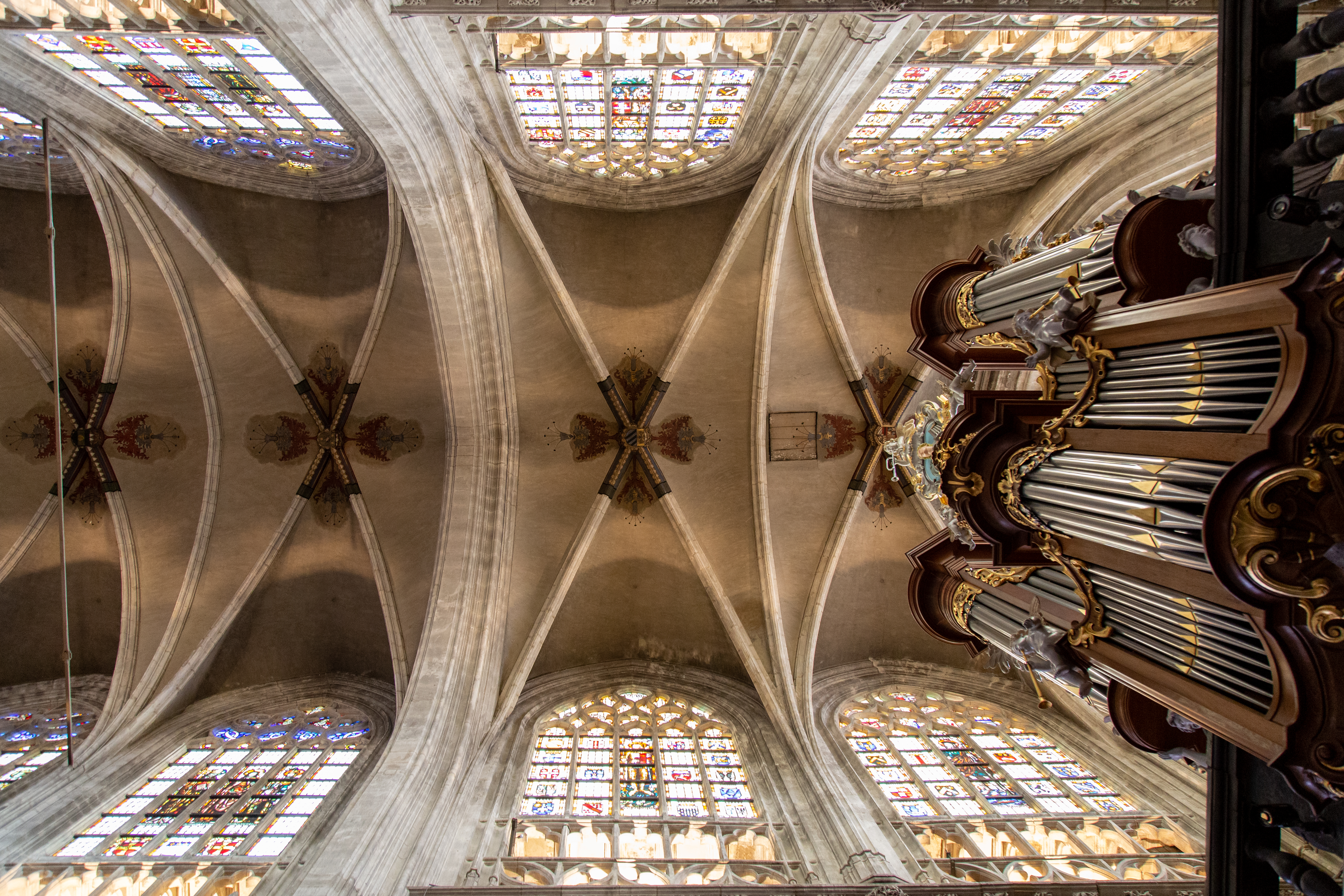
The vault of the nave

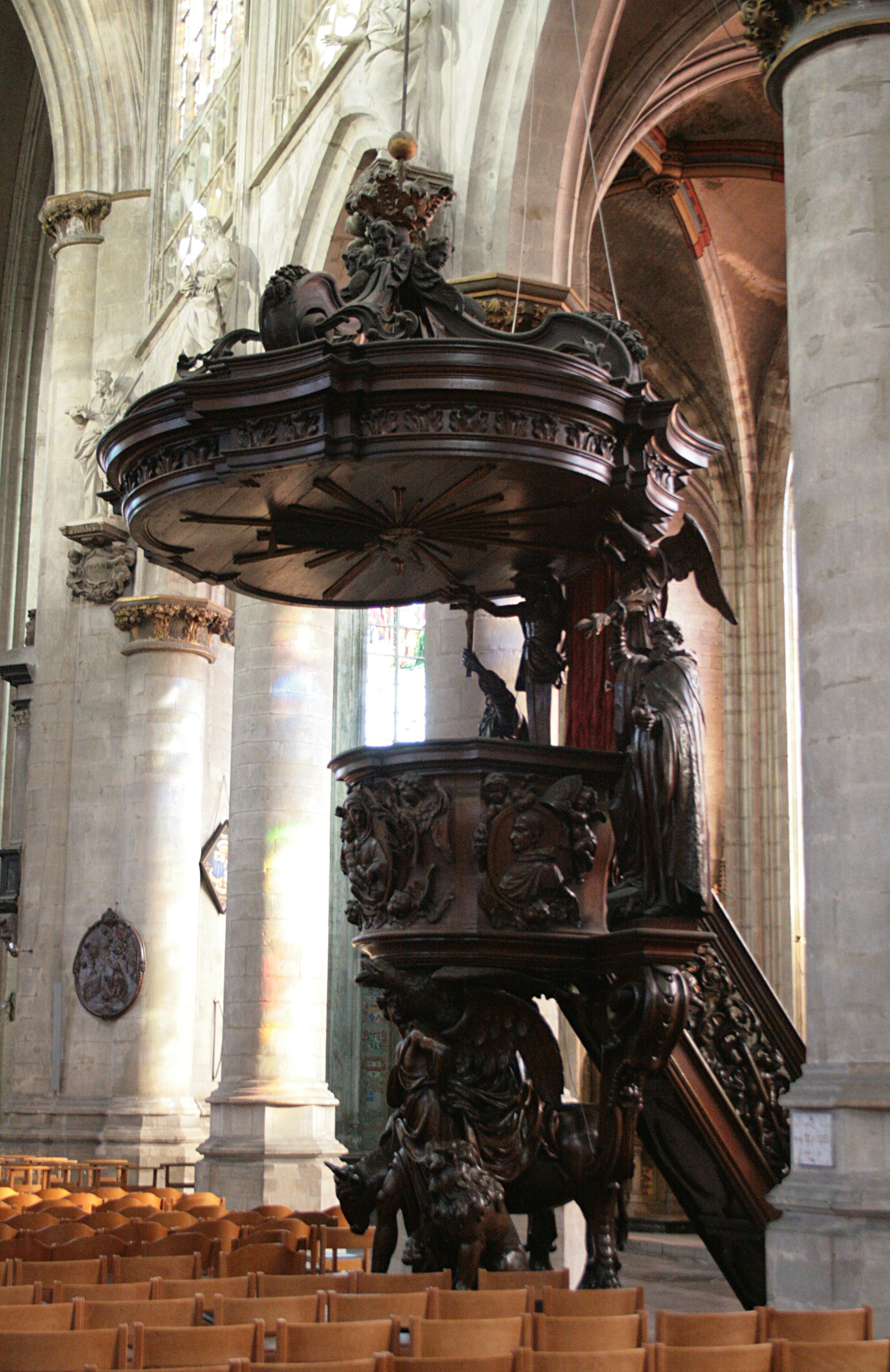
Baroque pulpit by Marc de Vos (1697)

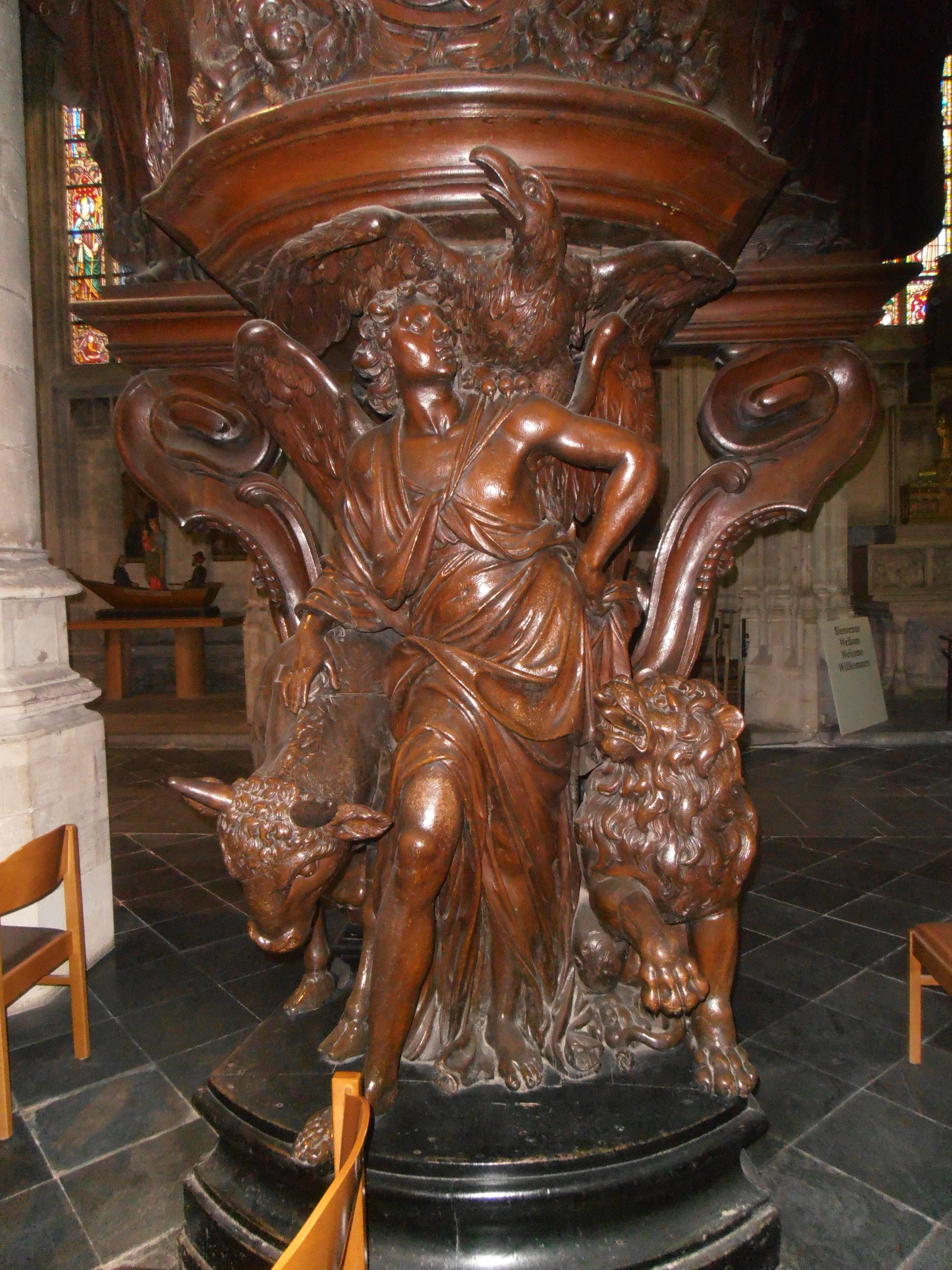
Detail of the pulpit

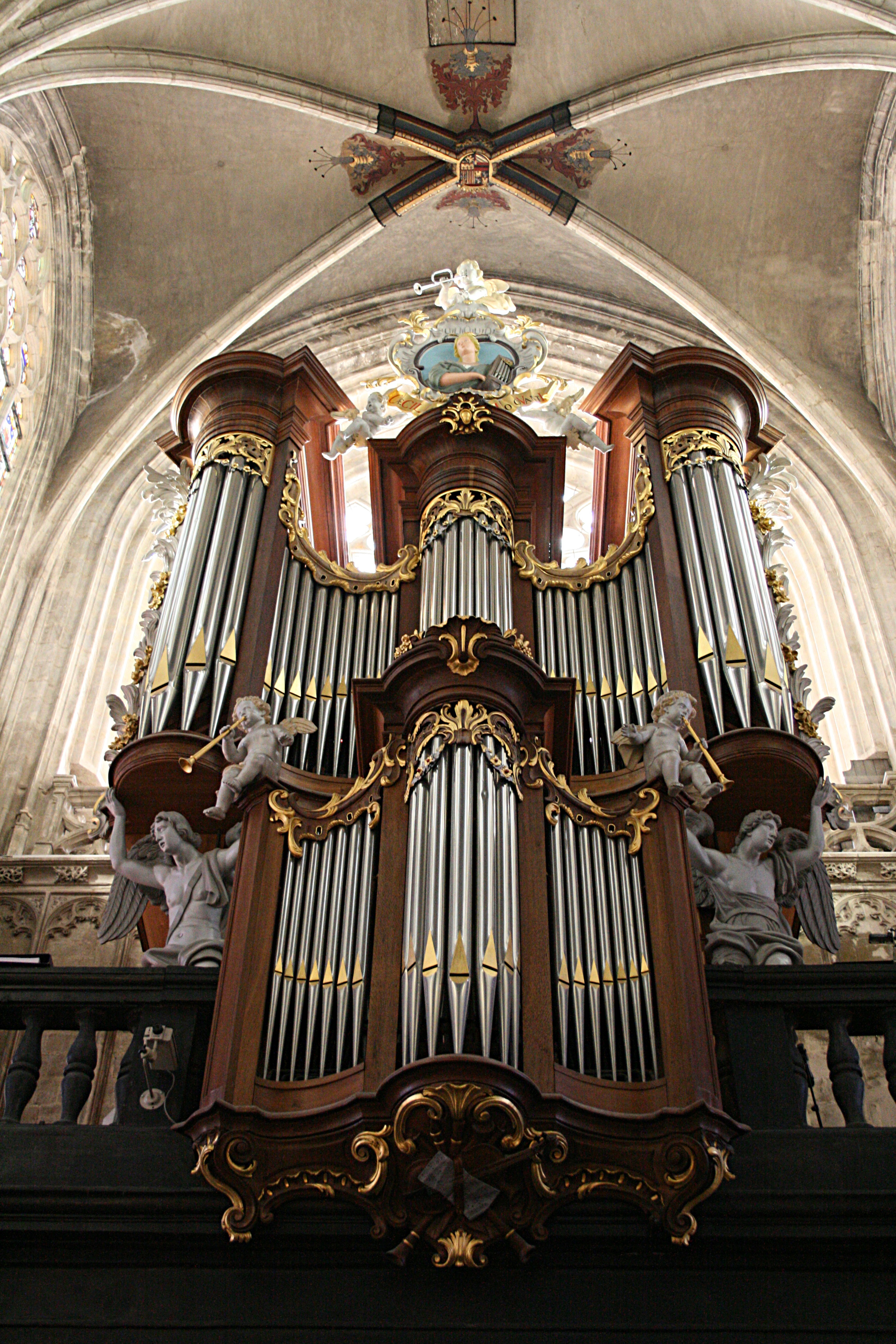
Organ by Jean-Baptiste Goynaut (1763)

=== Baroque chapels ===
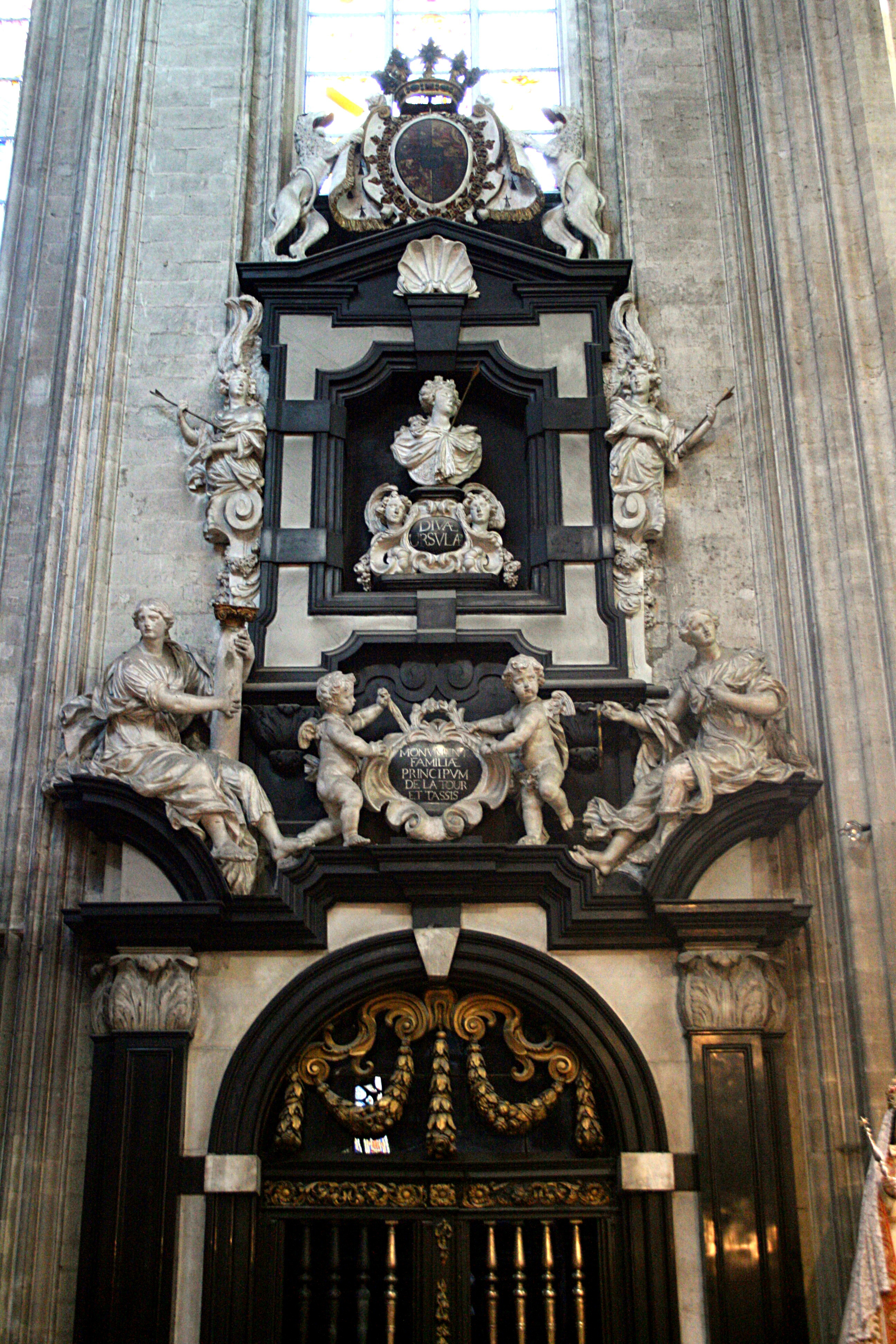
Entrance to the Chapel of St. Ursula

The church is best known for its two Baroque chapels, which the Thurn und Taxis family had built on both sides of the choir in the second half of the 17th century. One chapel is dedicated to Saint Ursula and was designed by Lucas Faydherbe. It contains ornate sculptures by Gabriël Grupello, Mattheus van Beveren, Jérôme Duquesnoy the Younger and Jan van Delen. The other chapel is dedicated to Saint Marculf, who is, amongst others, the patron saint of pharmacists and drapers. The two chapels are excellent examples of the High Baroque sculpture and architecture that developed in the Southern Netherlands.

Directly opposite the church, there is a memorial plaque on the location where the Thurn und Taxis family once had their residence, and as imperial postmasters, founded the first international postal service in 1516.

== Burials ==
- Ferdinand van Boisschot
- Claude Bouton, Lord of Corbaron
- Ernest du Baillet

== See also ==
- List of churches in Brussels
- Catholic Church in Belgium
- History of Brussels
- Culture of Belgium
- Belgium in the long nineteenth century
