= Protestantse Kerk Brussel =

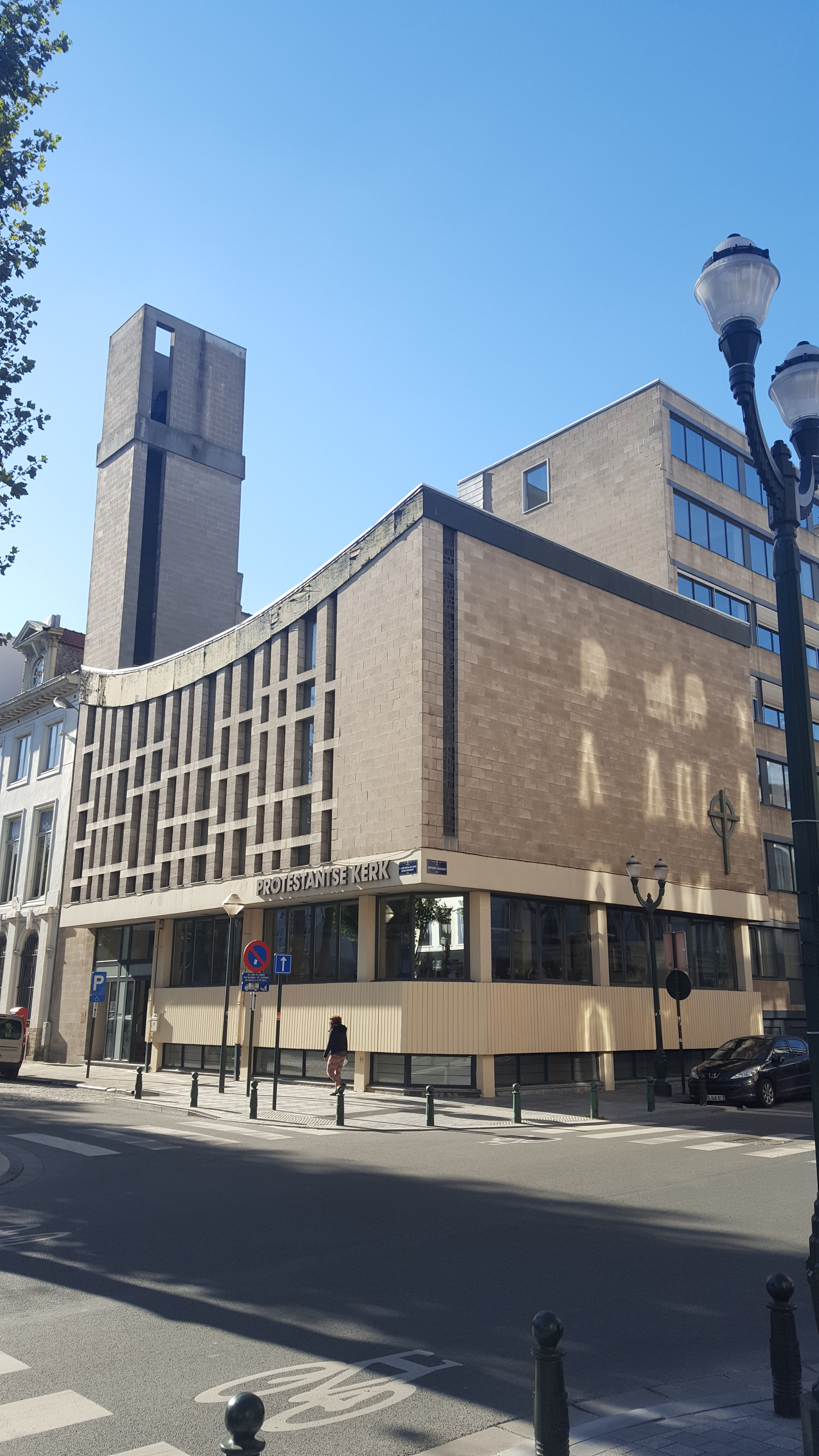
A picture of the church from the street

The Dutch-speaking Brussels Protestant Church (Protestantse Kerk Brussel) or 'Dutch Church' (Nederlandse Gemeente) was formally constituted in 1816 during the period when Belgium came under the Dutch House of Orange-Nassau.

The Temple of the Augustinians on Place de Broukere was designated a second Protestant place of worship, alongside the French/German-speaking Brussels Protestant Church on Place du Musée. The 'Dutch Church' (Nederlandse gemeente) met in the Temple from 1816 until the Belgian revolution in 1830.

The first Reformed service was held on 1 September 1816 and Hermannus Pauw (born 1770) and Dirk Rijke (1789–1830) served as ministers 1816-1830. In March 1817 the future William III was baptised in the Temple.

The last Protestant service was held in the Temple on 21 August 1830; from 5 September the building was occupied by Belgian patriots. Many of the worshippers fled the city and the Dutch Church was left without a building. However a small number remained in the city, some Dutch and others German, and they were ministered to by the German Lutheran preacher, L.P. Wieland Lütkemüller. The congregation was variously called the Lutheran Church, the Flemish Evangelical Church or the Dutch-German Evangelical Church (Nederduitse Evangelische Gemeente).

In September 1842 the Church Council called Henricus van Maasdijk as minister. Under his ministry the church grew and was joined by many Dutch Protestants, but also Flemish converts to the Protestant faith. Services were held in premises on Bruidsstraat and in a hall on Oude Kleerkopersstraat. In 1854 the congregation joined the Union of Evangelical Protestant Churches of Belgium and was given state recognition and a salary for the pastor. At this point it was decided to fund a new church building, which was erected at Zuidkaai (what would later become St. Katelijneplein). The new premises opened in 1857.

In 1874, N. de Jonge was inducted as minister. During his ministry Vincent van Gogh attended classes at the church to train as a missionary in 1878. After three months he discontinued his studies and moved to the Borinage region to work as a missionary in a mining community.

The church relocated from St. Katelijneplein to its current location at Nieuwe Graanmarkt in 1970 during the ministry of P. Fagel (pastor 1949-1972).
