= Jean-Henri Merle d'Aubigné =

Swiss Protestant minister and historian (1794–1872)

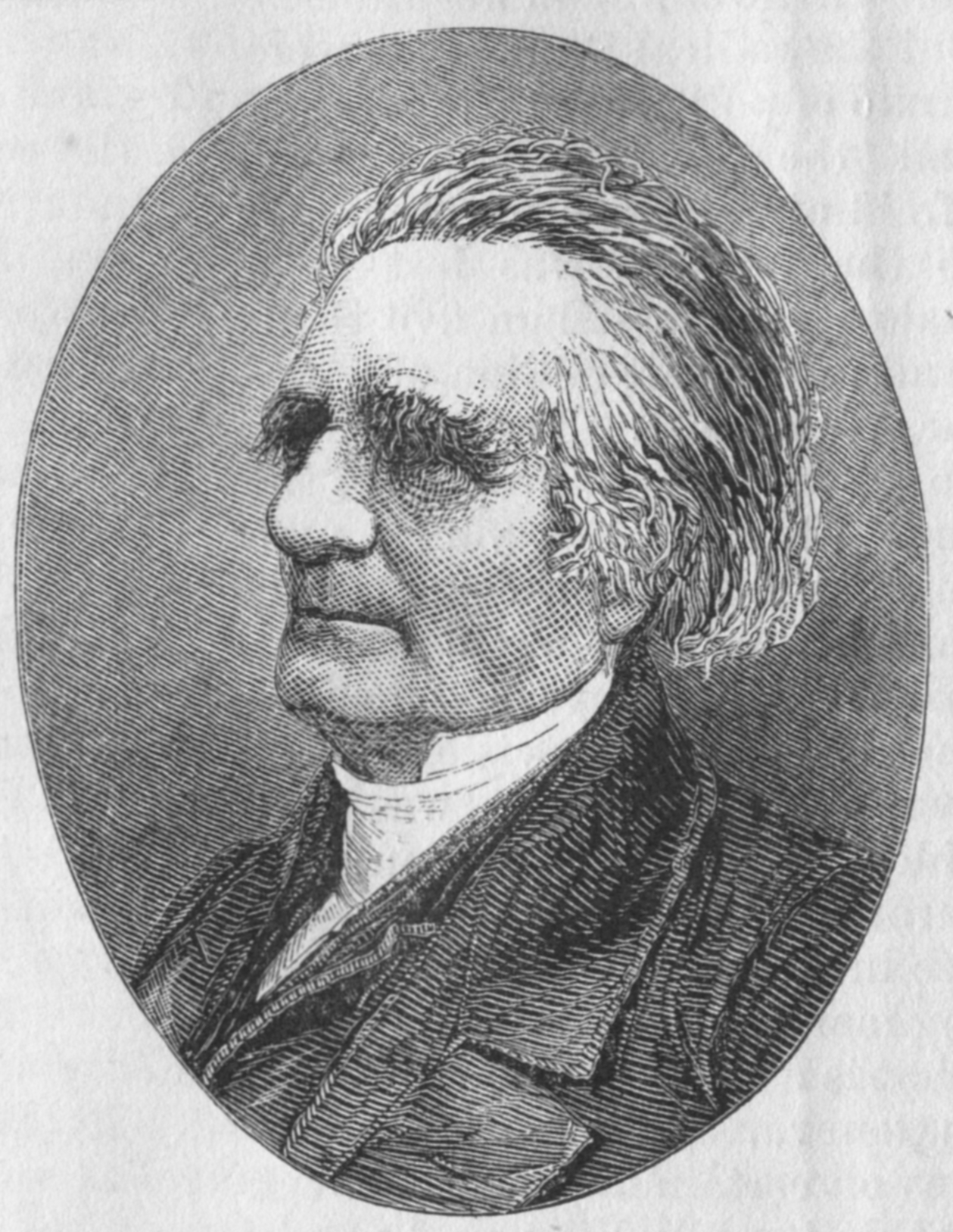
Engraving of Merle d'Aubigné from 1872.

Jean-Henri Merle d'Aubigné (16 August 1794 – 21 October 1872) was a Swiss Protestant minister and historian of the Reformation.

== Life ==
Jean-Henri Merle d'Aubigné was born at Les Eaux-Vives, a neighbourhood of Geneva. A street in the area is named after him. The ancestors of his father, Robert Merle d'Aubigné (1755–1799), were French Protestant refugees. The life Jean-Henri's parents chose for him was in commerce; but in college at the Académie de Genève, he instead decided on Christian ministry. He was profoundly influenced by Robert Haldane, the Scottish missionary and preacher who visited Geneva and became a leading light in Le Réveil, a conservative Protestant evangelical movement.

It was in small extra-curricular groups led by Haldane, that Merle d'Aubigné and his peers studied the Bible; according to church historian John Carrick, no classes were offered in the Christian scriptures at the school at that time, their having been replaced by the ancient Greek scholars.

When Merle d'Aubigné went abroad to further his education in 1817, Germany was about to celebrate the tercentenary of the Reformation; and thus early he conceived the ambition to write the history of that great epoch.

Studying at Berlin University for eight months 1817–1818, Merle d'Aubigné received inspiration from teachers as diverse as J. A. W. Neander and W. M. L. de Wette.

In 1818, Merle d'Aubigné took the post of pastor of the French Protestant church at Hamburg, where he served for five years. In 1823, he was called to become pastor of the Franco-German Brussels Protestant Church and preacher to the court of King William I of the Netherlands of the House of Orange-Nassau.

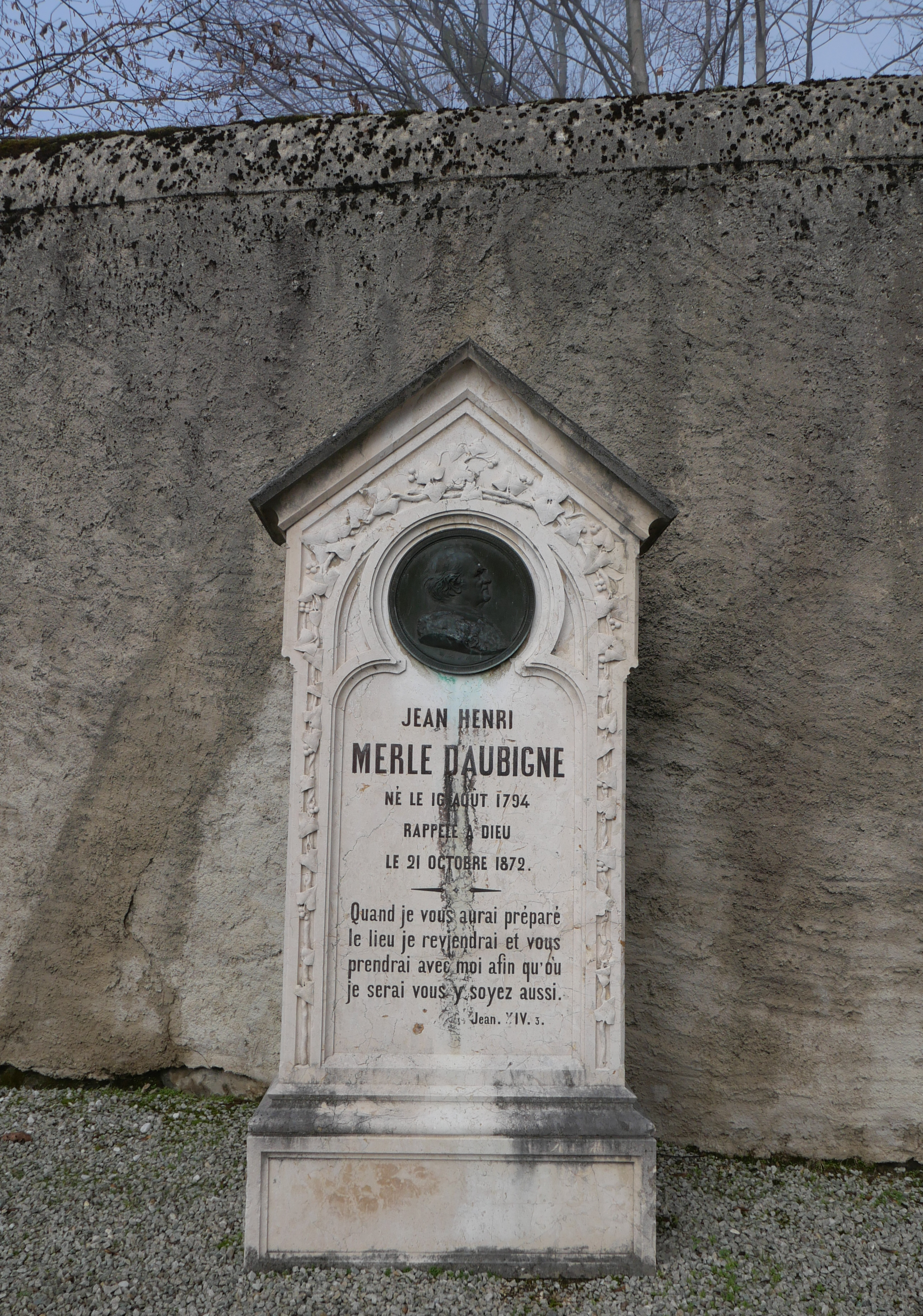
Merle d'Aubigné's tomb at the Old Cemetery of Cologny

During the Belgian revolution of 1830, Merle d'Aubigné thought it advisable to undertake pastoral work at home in Switzerland rather than accept an educational post in the family of the Dutch king. The Evangelical Society had been founded with the idea of promoting Evangelicalism in Geneva and elsewhere, but a need arose for a theological seminary to train pastors. On his return to Switzerland, Merle d'Aubigné was invited to become professor of church history in such a seminary, and he also continued to labor in the cause of evangelical Protestantism. In him the Evangelical Alliance found a hearty promoter. He frequently visited England, was made a D.C.L. v Oxford University, and received civic honors from the city of Edinburgh. He died suddenly in 1872.

The first portion of Merle d'Aubigné's Histoire de la Reformation - History of the Reformation of the Sixteenth Century - which was devoted to the earlier period of the movement in Germany, i.e., Martin Luther's time, at once earned a foremost place among modern French ecclesiastical historians, and was translated into most European languages, the American version was published by Robert Carter. The second portion, The History of the Reformation in Europe in the Time of Calvin, dealing with reform in the French reformer's sphere, exhaustively treats the subject with the same scholarship as the earlier work, but the second volume did not meet with the same success. It is part of the subject Merle d'Aubigné was most competent to discuss, and was nearly completed at the time of his death. Such was the scope of Merle d'Aubigné's scholarship and his level of dedication, states church historian John Carrick, that Merle d'Aubigné " visited the major libraries of Central and Western Europe in order to read original documents in Latin, French, German, Dutch, and English."

Among minor treatises authored by Merle d'Aubigné, the most important are his vindication of the character and the aims of Oliver Cromwell, and his sketch of the trendings of the Church of Scotland.

== Works ==
His principal works are

- Discours sur étude de l'histoire du christianisme (Geneva, 1832)
- Le Luthéranisme et la Réforme (Paris, 1844)
- Germany, England and Scotland, or Recollections of a Swiss Pastor (London, 1848)
- Trois siècles de lutte en Ecosse, entre deux rois et deux royaumes; Le Protecteur ou la république d'Angleterre aux jours de Cromwell (Paris, 1848)
- Le Concile et l'infaillibilité (1870)
- Histoire de la Réformation au XVIe siècle (Paris, 1835–1853; new ed:, 1861–1862, in 5 vols.)
- Histoire de la Réformation en Europe au temps de Calvin (8 vols., 1862–1877)
