= Temple of the Augustinians, Brussels =

Demolished church in Brussels, Belgium

Temple of the Augustinians
- Temple des Augustins (French); Augustijnentempel (Dutch)
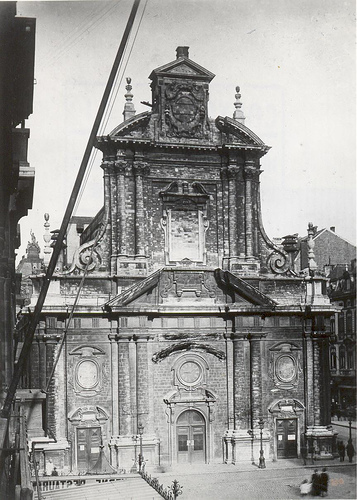
- The Temple of the Augustinians, c. 1880

Religion
- Status: Demolished

Location
- Location: Place de Brouckère / De Brouckèreplein; 1000 City of Brussels, Brussels-Capital Region
- Country: Belgium
- Interactive map of Temple of the Augustinians
- Coordinates: 50°51′6.81″N 4°21′11.54″E

Architecture
- Architect: Jacob Franquart
- Style: Brabantine Baroque
- Groundbreaking: 1620
- Completed: 1642

The Temple of the Augustinians (French: Temple des Augustins; Dutch: Augustijnentempel), or the Church of the Augustinians (French: Église des Augustins; Dutch: Augustijnenkerk), was a Brabantine Baroque-style church in Brussels, Belgium, designed and built from 1621 to 1642 by the architect Jacob Franquart for the Augustinians order. It was located on the Place de Brouckère/De Brouckèreplein in central Brussels until its demolition in 1893–94. Its façade's masonry, however, was preserved, being disassembled and reconstructed as the façade of the Church of the Holy Trinity in Ixelles.

== History ==
=== Early history ===
The Augustinians settled in Brussels in 1589 and occupied the convent of the Brethren of the Common Life, which had been located on the banks of the river Senne in the city centre since 1336. The church was built from 1620 to 1642 in the Brabantine Baroque style according to plans by the architect Jacob Franquart. Closed by French revolutionary troops in 1796, the church, as the only remaining part of the convent, reopened for Catholic worship in 1805. In the run-up to the Battle of Waterloo (1815), it served as an arsenal for British troops and subsequently as a military hospital.

Under Dutch rule, the building was designated a Protestant place of worship, alongside the Brussels Protestant Church on the Place du Musée/Museumplein, and the Dutch Church (Nederlandse gemeente) met in the Temple from 1816 until the Belgian Revolution in 1830. The first Reformed service was held on 1 September 1816, and Hermannus Pauw and Dirk Rijke served as ministers from 1816 until 1830. On 27 March 1817, the future King William III of the Netherlands was baptised in the Temple. Anglican Reverend Holworthy, chaplain to the British Ambassador, held English-language services in the Temple until 1829.

The last Protestant service was held on 21 August 1830. From 5 September, the building was occupied by Belgian patriots. Many of the worshippers fled the city and the Dutch Church was left without a building, meeting in various locations before it eventually built its own premises at Zuidkaai in 1857.

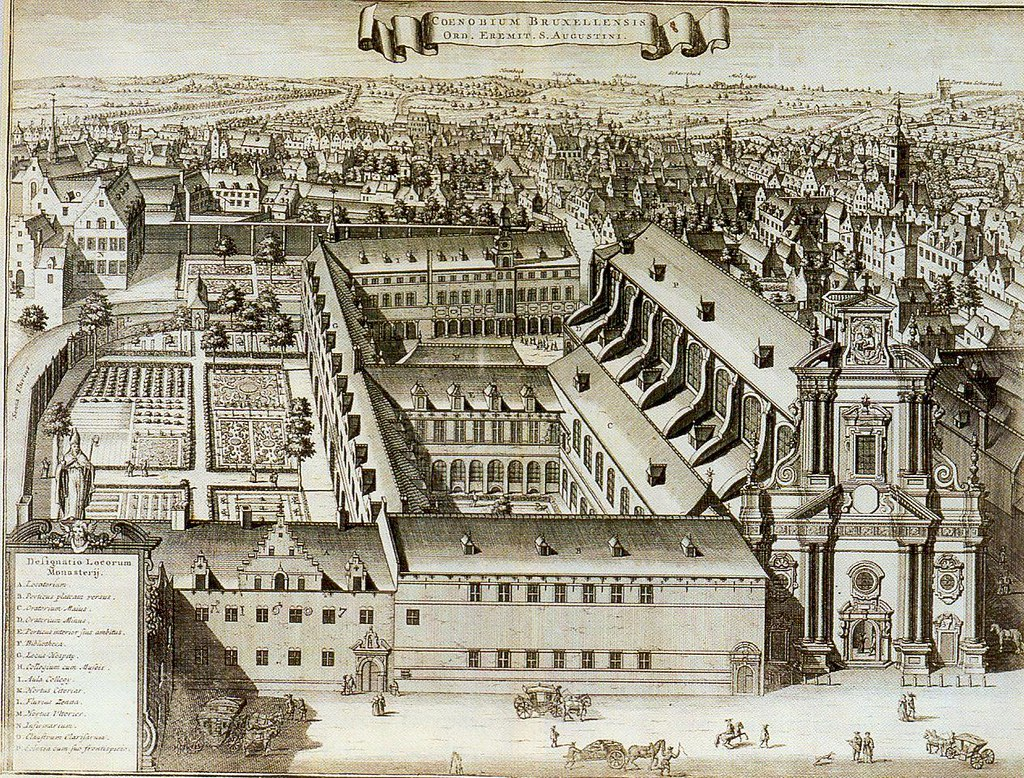
The Augustinian Monastery depicted in Chorographia Sacra Brabantiae, 17th century

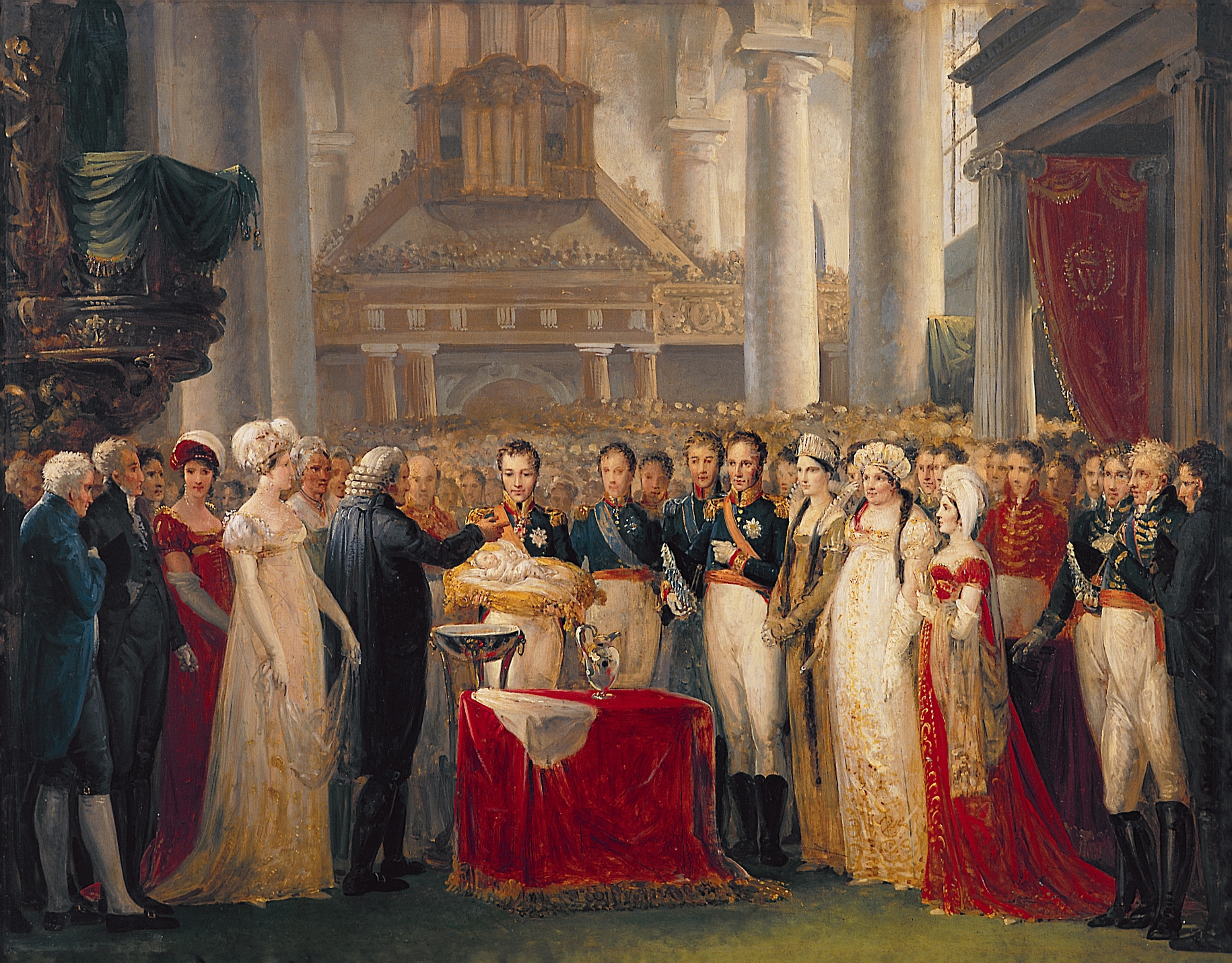
Baptism of King William III of the Netherlands in the Temple of the Augustinians, 1817

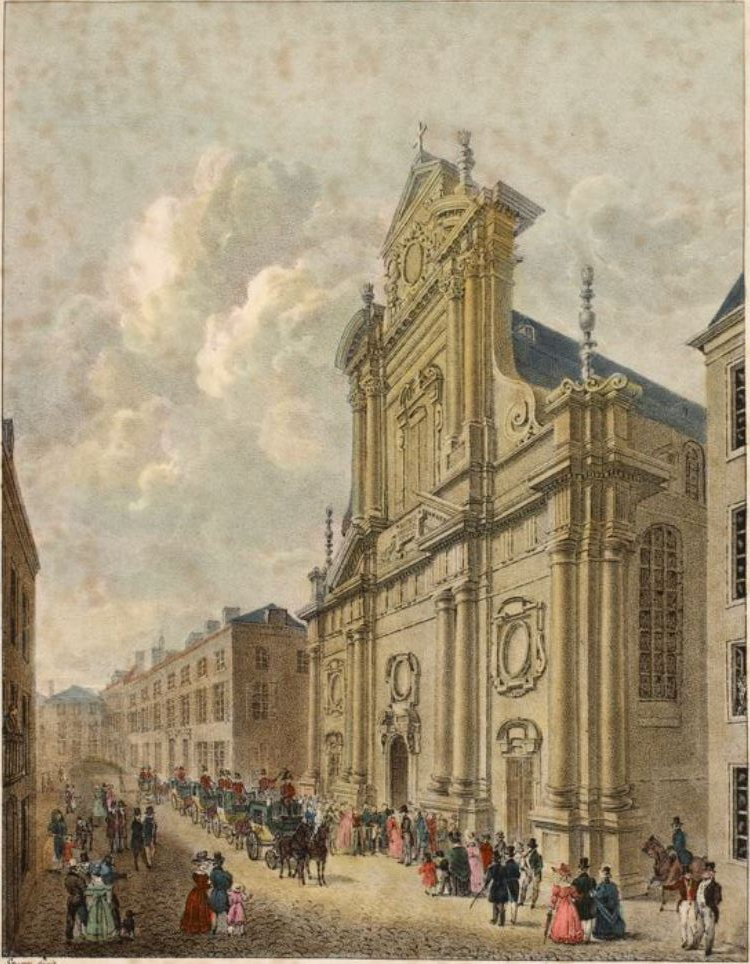
The Augustinian Temple, when it served as a Protestant church, 1830

=== Later usage, demolition and partial rebuilding ===
After 1830, the Temple served various purposes: for performances, exhibitions, and even as a post office. It survived the covering of the Senne (1867–1871), a drastic destruction and renovation of downtown Brussels. At the centre of the Place de Brouckère/De Brouckèreplein, the church's façade was intended by the architect Léon Suys to be one of the new boulevards' focal points. The work to cover the river, which nearly surrounded the church, preserved the building's integrity at great trouble and expense, but it was finally demolished in 1893, its style no longer popular with the people and its presence unsuitable for the area. The church was replaced by a fountain-obelisk dedicated to the memory of the former mayor of the City of Brussels, Jules Anspach.

The Temple was demolished in 1893–94. Its façade's masonry, however, was preserved, being disassembled and reconstructed as the façade of the Church of the Holy Trinity on the Parvis de la Trinité/Drievuldigheidsvoorplein in Ixelles. Its Baroque pulpit by Marc de Vos (1697) now adorns the Church of Our Lady of Victories in the Sablon/Zavel district. The Rue des Augustins/Augustijnenstraat, a side street leading into the Place de Brouckère from the south-west, still reminds of the Temple's former presence there.

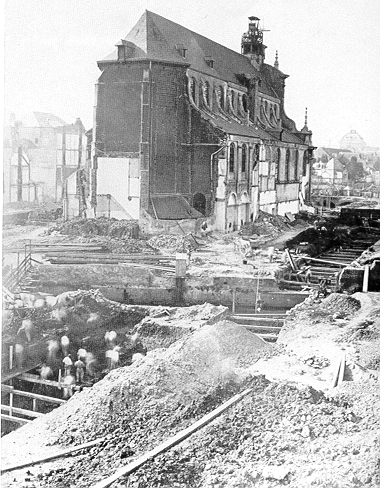
Rear view of the Temple during the covering of the Senne, 1867–1871

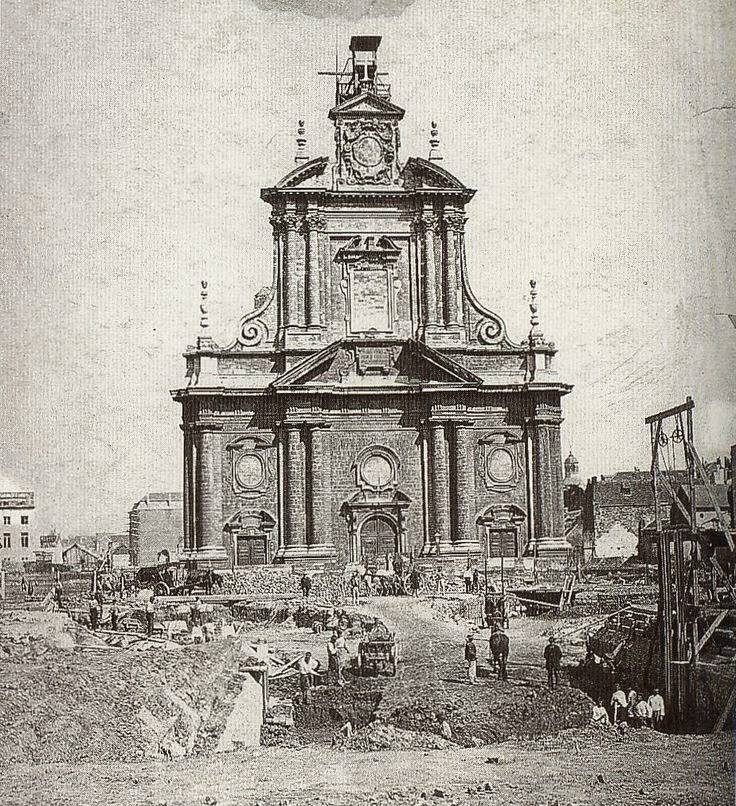
Façade of the Temple on the Place de Brouckère/De Brouckèreplein, 1867–1871

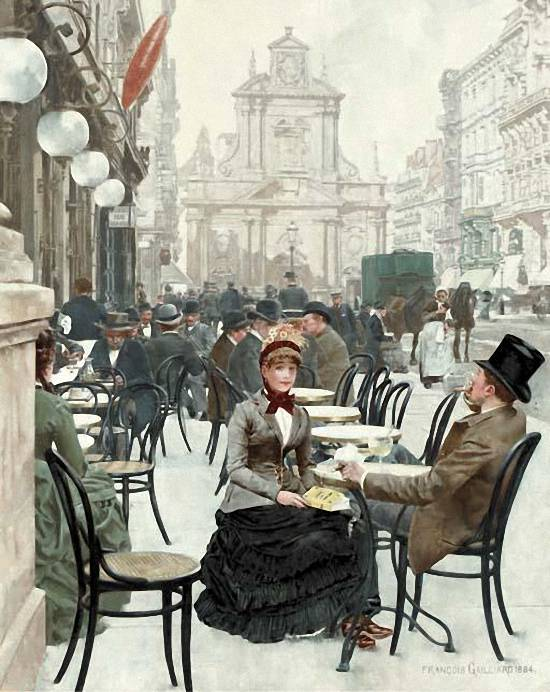
View of the Temple in a painting by Franz Gailliard, 1884

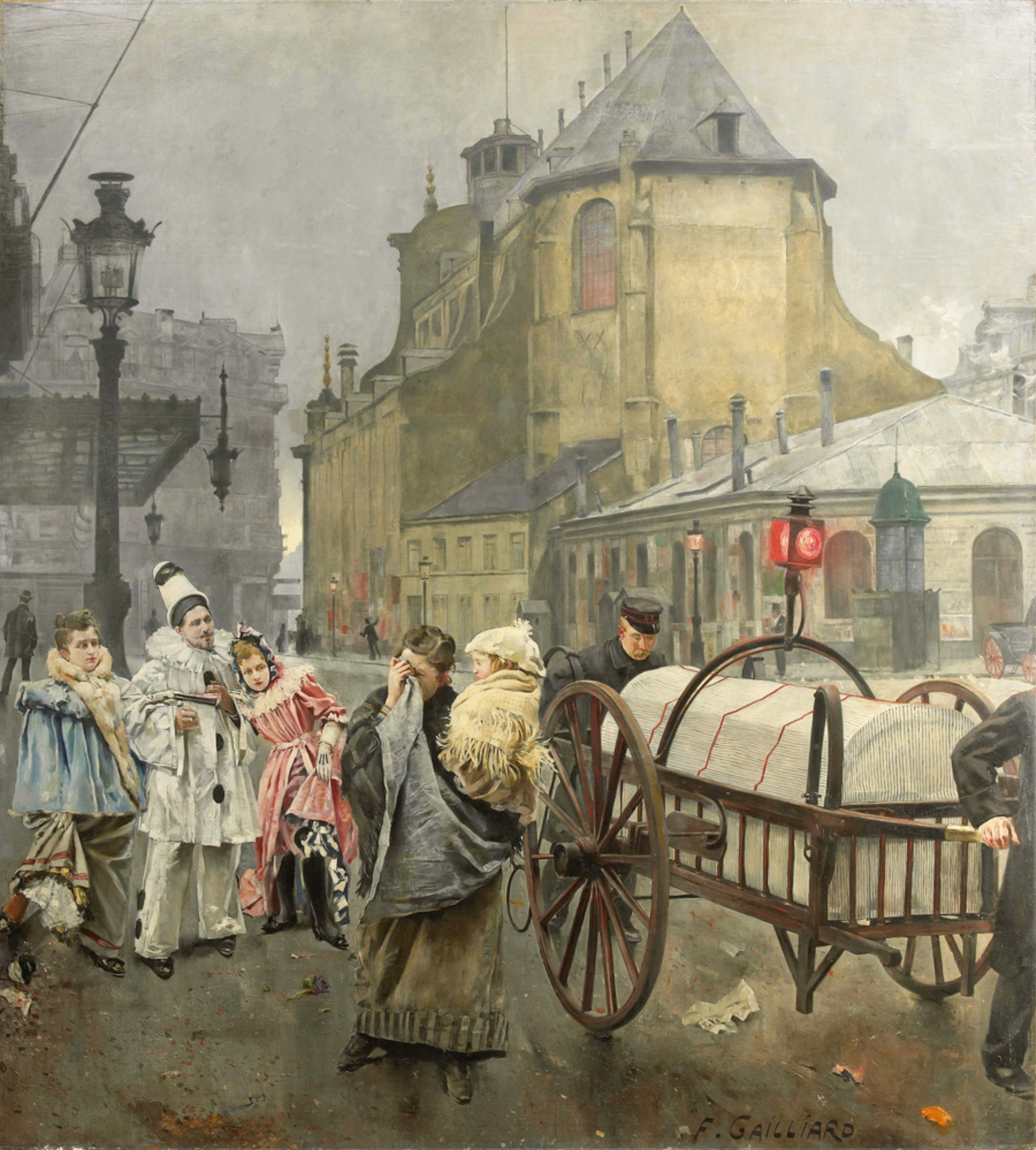
Another rear view of the Temple shortly before demolition, by Gailliard, 1890

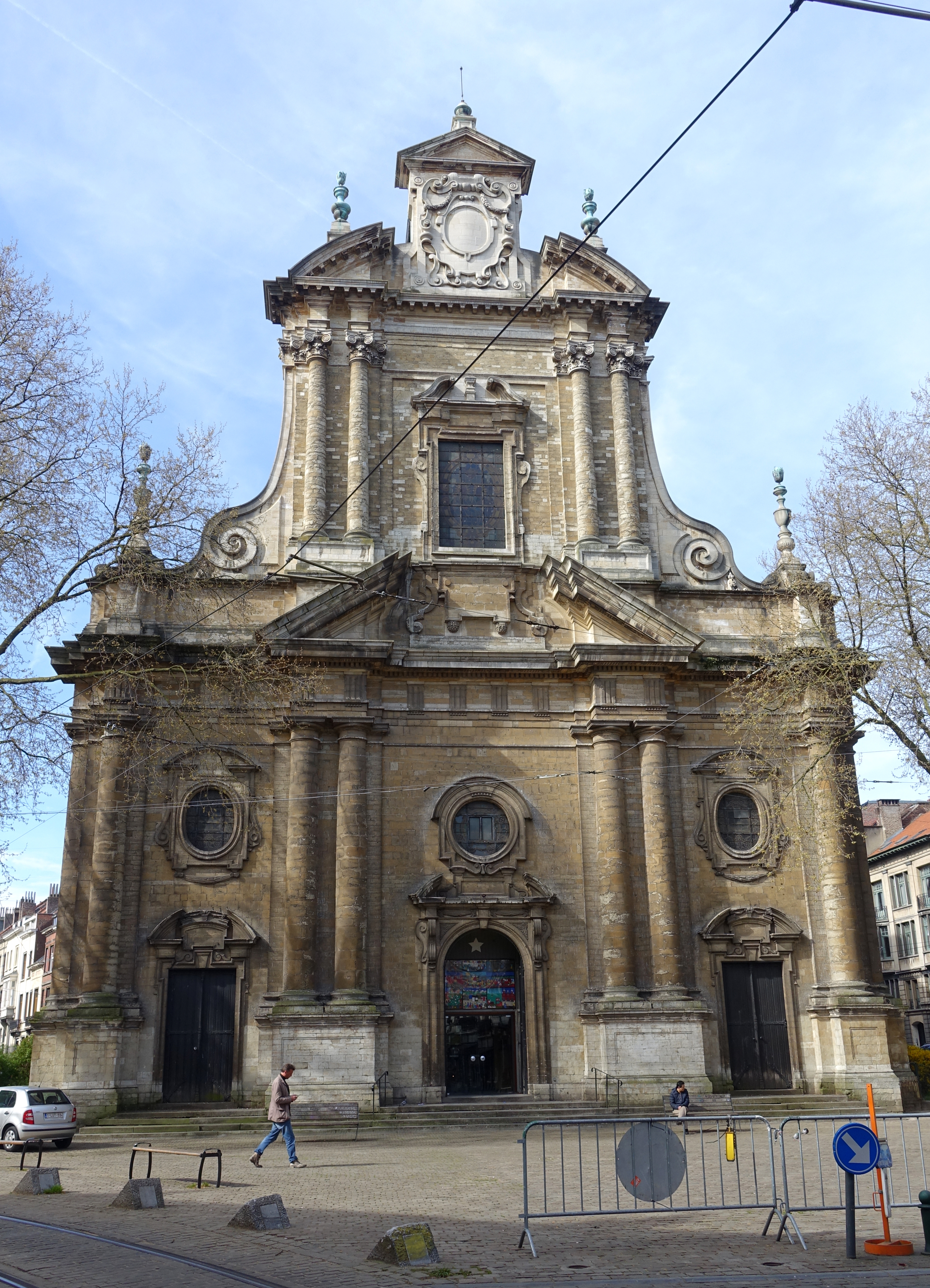
Façade of the Church of the Holy Trinity in Ixelles, 2016

== See also ==
- List of churches in Brussels
- History of Brussels
- Culture of Belgium
- Belgium in the long nineteenth century
