= Brussels Protestant Church =

Coordinates: 50.8431°N 4.3574°E

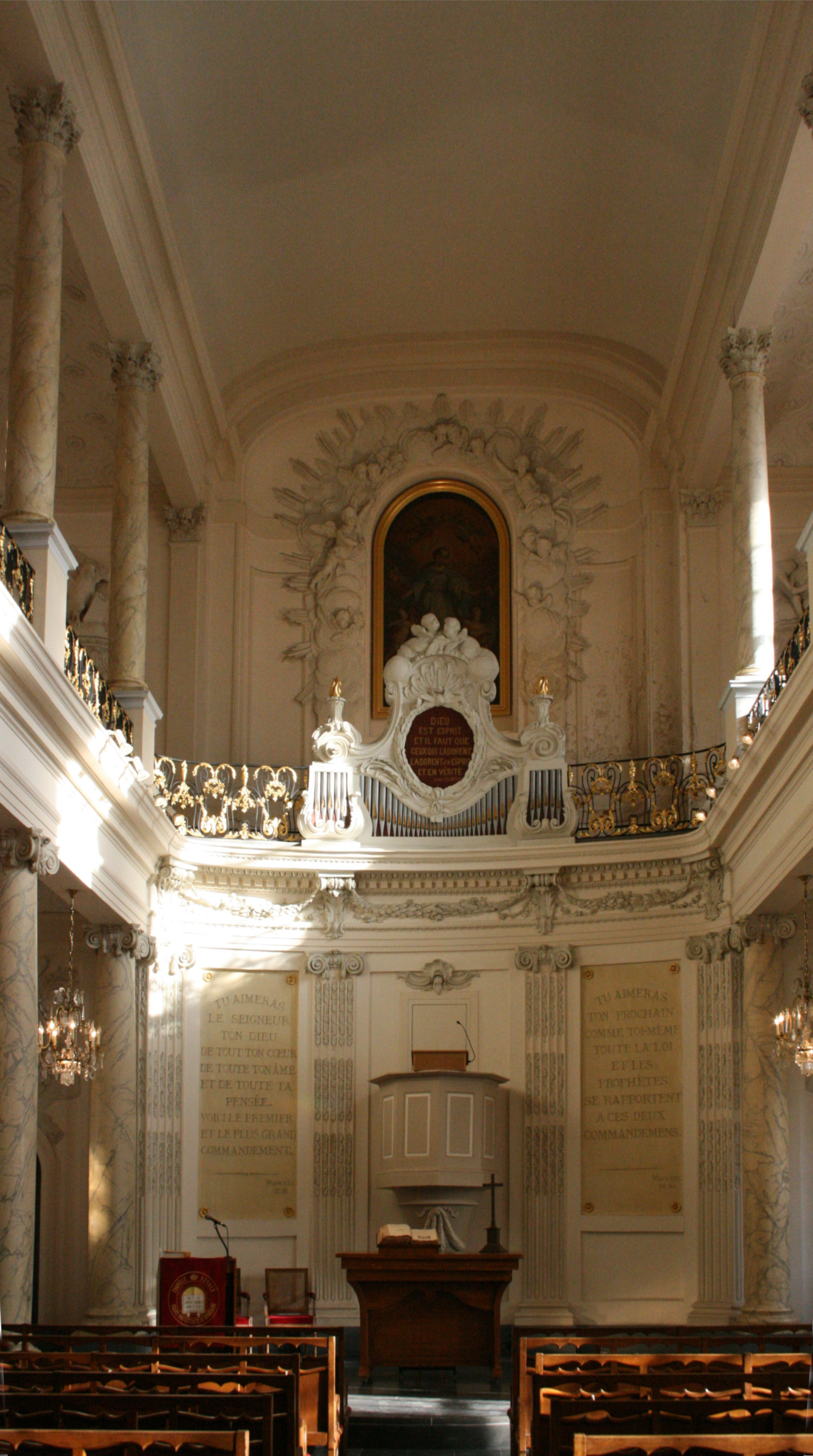
Protestant Church of Brussels, in the former Palace of Charles of Lorraine (1760), Place du Musée/Museumplein

Brussels Protestant Church (French: Église Protestante de Bruxelles; Dutch: Brusselse protestantse kerk) is a Brussels-based Protestant Christian congregation formally constituted in 1804 and whose roots go back to the Protestant Reformation of the 16th century.

== History ==
The origins of Protestant Christianity in Brussels go back to before 1523 when Henri Voes and Jean Van Esschen were martyred at Brussels for their new-found Evangelical faith. In 1535, the English Bible translator, William Tyndale, was captured in Antwerp and burnt at the stake in Vilvoorde, near Brussels. The Belgian Protestant churches were subjected to intense persecution during the Counter-Reformation and as a result Protestants met in private. From 1656, churches were again constituted and in 1781 obtained a measure of freedom under Joseph II, Holy Roman Emperor. From 1783 to 1789, a Protestant group, led by a Genevan pastor, Isaac Salomon Anspach, met on the Rue Ducale/Hertogstraat.

When in 1802, the French Republic granted freedom of religion, the Lutheran and Reformed Christians of the city petitioned the authorities to be able to conduct services freely. The two confessions were granted use of a single building, the court chapel on the Place du Musée/Museumplein, designated 'Protestant church' and were to be served by a single minister. Napoleon subsequently confirmed the congregation's right to assemble in 1804. Jean-Pierre Charlier served as the first pastor from 1804 until 1822, holding services in French and German on alternate weeks. After a one-year vacancy, the Genevan preacher of Le Réveil, Merle D'Aubigne, was called as pastor and served from 1823 until 1830. One of the members of d'Aubigne's congregation strongly influenced by his pastor was Groen van Prinsterer, who become a leading light in the Dutch Het Réveil.

Following the Battle of Waterloo (1815), Brussels had become the southern capital of the United Kingdom of the Netherlands under the House of Orange-Nassau. In 1816, the congregation had taken the name Église chrétienne protestante française-allemande de Bruxelles (the Franco-German Protestant Christian Church of Brussels). Its services were attended by Crown Prince William of the House of Orange-Nassau, who represented the monarchy in Brussels. In 1824, English-language Anglican services, led by Thomas Price, were also being held in the church on the Place du Musée. In 1816, Crown Prince William decreed that the Temple of the Augustinians be made available as a second place of Protestant worship in the city and the Dutch Church (Nederlandse gemeente) met there until 1830.

When pastor D'Aubigné left in the wake of the Belgian Revolution and independence of 1830, Jonathan de Visme (minister at Dour, Mons and Paturages), served as interim moderator and eventually Chrétien-Henri Vent was appointed as successor, serving until his death 1844. His preaching was said to be "rationalistic" and "cool and academic", at a time when many longed for "evangelical, saving, pious" preaching. During his ministry, in 1834, a group left the church to form what would become the Temple de l'Observatoire. In 1830, the Belgian state officially recognised the church as L'Église Protestante de Bruxelles (Brussels Protestant Church), the name it bears to the present day. Its services were attended by King Leopold I, who was a Protestant.

In 1844, Ernest-Henri Vent, son of Chrétien-Henri, was appointed minister of the French-speaking congregation (serving until 1867), while Friedrich Wilhelm Becker was entrusted with ministry to the German-speakers (serving until 1869). During this time the Franco-German church engaged in much social work, founding a Diakonie, an orphanage and offering advice to the general public.

== Beliefs ==
=== Marriage ===
The church has an inclusive vision and celebrates both opposite-sex marriages and same-sex marriages.

== Pastors ==
List of subsequent pastors serving the congregation (up until 2002):

- 1867–1892: Emile Rochedieu
- 1869–1889: Karl Herbst
- 1889–1892: A. Beyerhaus
- 1892–1932: Paul Rochedieu
- 1905–1918: E. Koenigs
- 1929–1932: Matthieu Schyns
- 1932–1937: Ch. Ed. Reymond
- 1932–1968: Matthieu Schyns
- 1937–1938: M. Pfender
- 1938–1940: Georges Gander
- 1941–1945: Henri Serex
- 1946–1953: Ch.-A. Marguerat
- 1964–2004: Léon-Alexis Rocteur
- 1970–1979: Fritz Hoyois
- 1983–1988: Jacques Hostetter
- 1992–2002: Jean-Loup Seban

The last German-speaking pastor was E. Koenigs; the post was discontinued in 1919, following World War I.
