= L'Église de la rue Belliard =

Coordinates: 50°50′32.36″N 4°22′8.34″E

L’Église de la rue Belliard was a Brussels-based evangelical Protestant congregation, started in 1837 when a group left the Temple de l'Observatoire Protestant church.
