= Carloo =

Carloo may refer to:

- Sint-Job, also known as Carloo, now part of Uccle, Belgium
- 12339 Carloo, a minor planet

== See also ==
- Karloo, a locality in Western Australia
