= Scheut =

Neighbourhood in Brussels, Belgium

- Neighbourhood
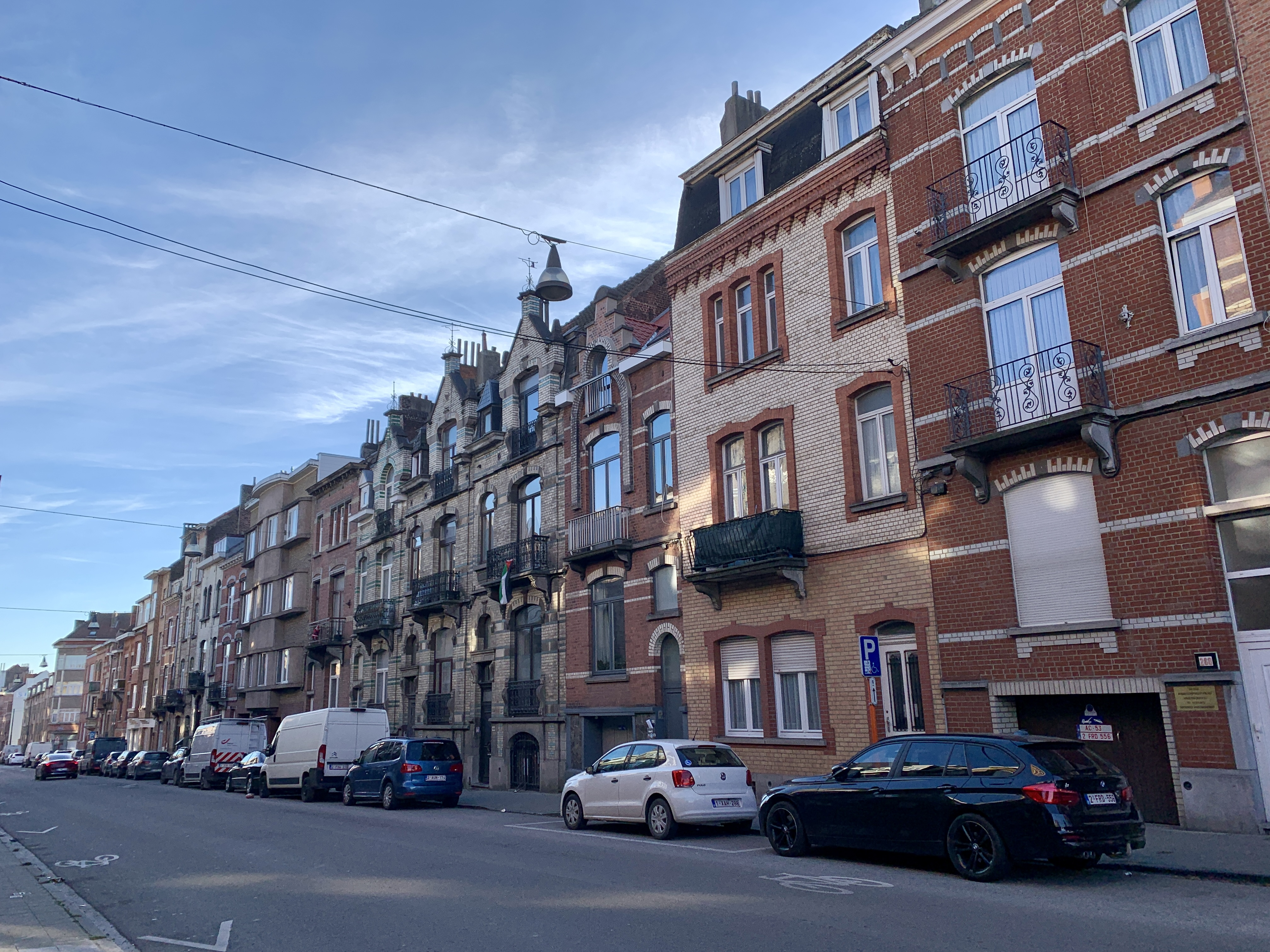
- Avenue de Scheut/Scheutlaan

- Location within Brussels Scheut (Belgium)
- Coordinates: 50°50′51″N 4°18′27″E
- Country: Belgium
- Region: Brussels-Capital Region
- Arrondissement: Brussels-Capital
- Municipality: Anderlecht
- Time zone: UTC+1 (CET)
  - Summer (DST): UTC+2 (CEST)
- Postal code: 1070
- Area codes: 02

Scheut (French: [skøt]; Dutch: [sxøːt]) is a district of Anderlecht, a municipality of Brussels, Belgium. Located in the north of Anderlecht, it is bounded by the border with the municipality of Molenbeek-Saint-Jean to the north, the historical centre of Anderlecht to the south, the Birmingham district to the east, the Scheutveld district to the west and the semi-natural site of the Scheutbos to the north-west.

The district is crossed by the Chaussée de Ninove/Ninoofsesteenweg running east–west and is served by the metro stations Aumale, Jacques Brel, and Gare de l'Ouest/Weststation (Brussels-West Station).

== History ==
=== Origins and medieval times ===
In 1356, the Count of Flanders, Louis II, fought against Brussels on the territory of Anderlecht, in the so-called Battle of Scheut, supposedly over a monetary matter. Although he defeated his sister-in-law, the Duchess of Brabant, Joanna, and briefly took her title, she regained it the following year with the help of the Holy Roman Emperor, Charles IV. In 1393, Joanna's charter made Anderlecht a part of Brussels.

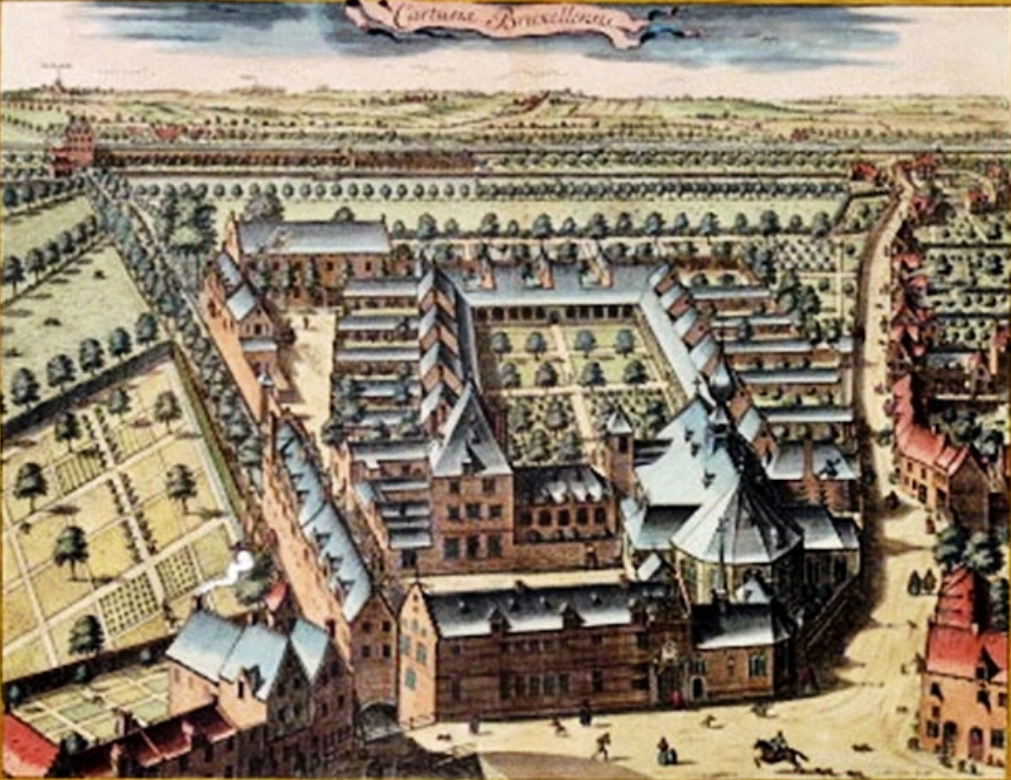
The Carthusian Monastery depicted in Chorographia Sacra Brabantiae (1727). On the horizon are Anderlecht and Scheut.

In 1454, the Carthusian Monastery of Our Lady of Grace was founded in Scheut. Due to the wars of religion, it was abandoned by 1578. It was rebuilt in the 1580s, but the monastery was finally transferred to Brussels. On the site of the Carthusian Monastery stood a chapel called Our Lady of Scheut, whose pleasant location, in the middle of a grove, made this place very popular at the time.

=== 15th–18th centuries ===
The 17th and 18th centuries were marked by the wars between the Low Countries and France. During the Nine Years' War, it is from the high ground of Scheut that the bombardment of Brussels of 1695 took place. Together with the resulting fire, it was the most destructive event in the entire history of Brussels. On 13 November 1792, right after the Battle of Jemappes, General Dumouriez and the French Revolutionary army routed the Austrians there once again. Among the consequences were the disbanding of the canons and Anderlecht being proclaimed an independent municipality by the French.

=== 19th century and later ===
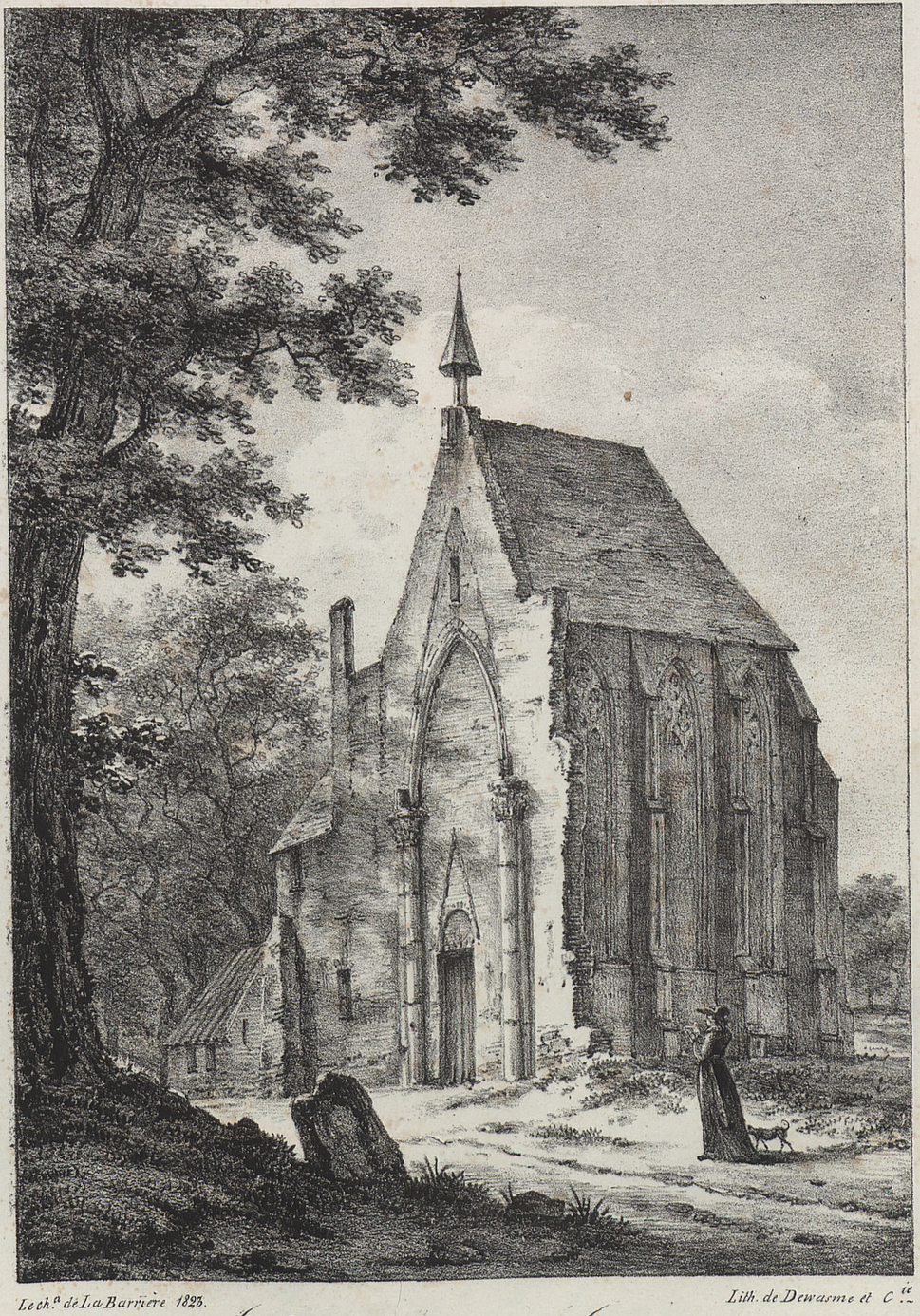
Former chapel of Scheut (1823)

It is also in this district, on the Chaussée de Ninove/Ninoofsesteenweg, that lay the foundations of the Scheutveld College, on 28 April 1863, by the Catholic priest Theophile Verbist. The congregation of Scheut Missionaries went on to evangelise China, Mongolia, the Philippines, as well as the Congo Free State/Belgian Congo (modern-day Democratic Republic of the Congo). The old chapel was incorporated into the Scheutists' church, but was demolished in 1974 to make way for a supermarket. The then-curator of the Erasmus House (a museum in Anderlecht devoted to the Dutch humanist writer Erasmus of Rotterdam) was able to save the carved corbels and keystones at the last minute. These were recently attributed to Rogier van der Weyden.

== Sights ==
- The Church of St. Vincent de Paul, a former Catholic church designed in Art Deco style and built in 1935–1937. Its presbytery and outbuildings were converted into a new school, which opened in 2018.
- The Museum of China – Scheut, which houses documents and pieces brought back to Europe by the congregation of Scheut Missionaries, including a 15th-century bronze Buddha.
- The Parc Forestier/Bospark, located in the former Anderlecht Cemetery. The old cemetery's monumental entrance and walls still surround the park to this day.
- The main police station of the 5341 Brussels South police zone: Anderlecht, Forest and Saint-Gilles.
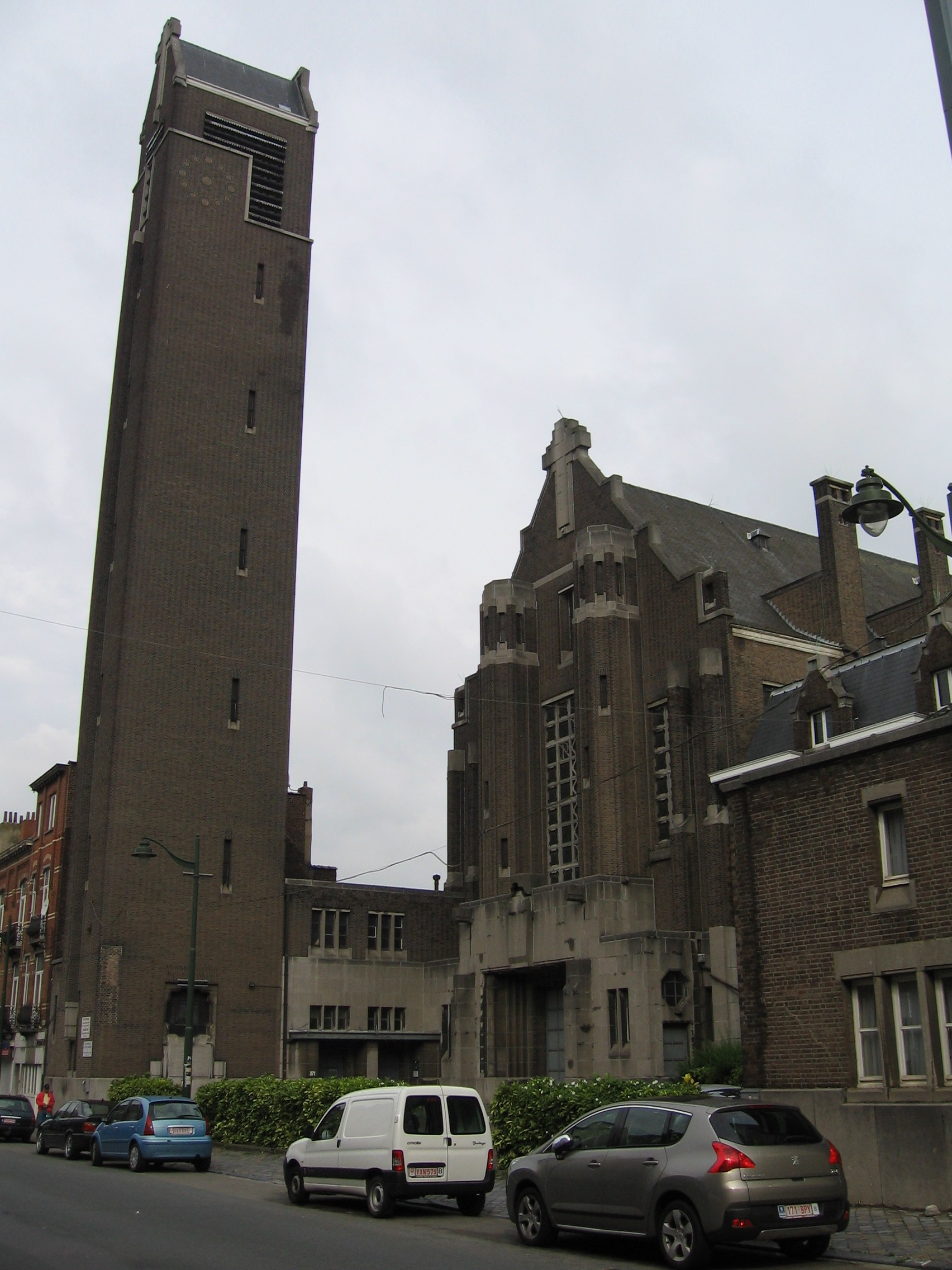
Church of St. Vincent de Paul

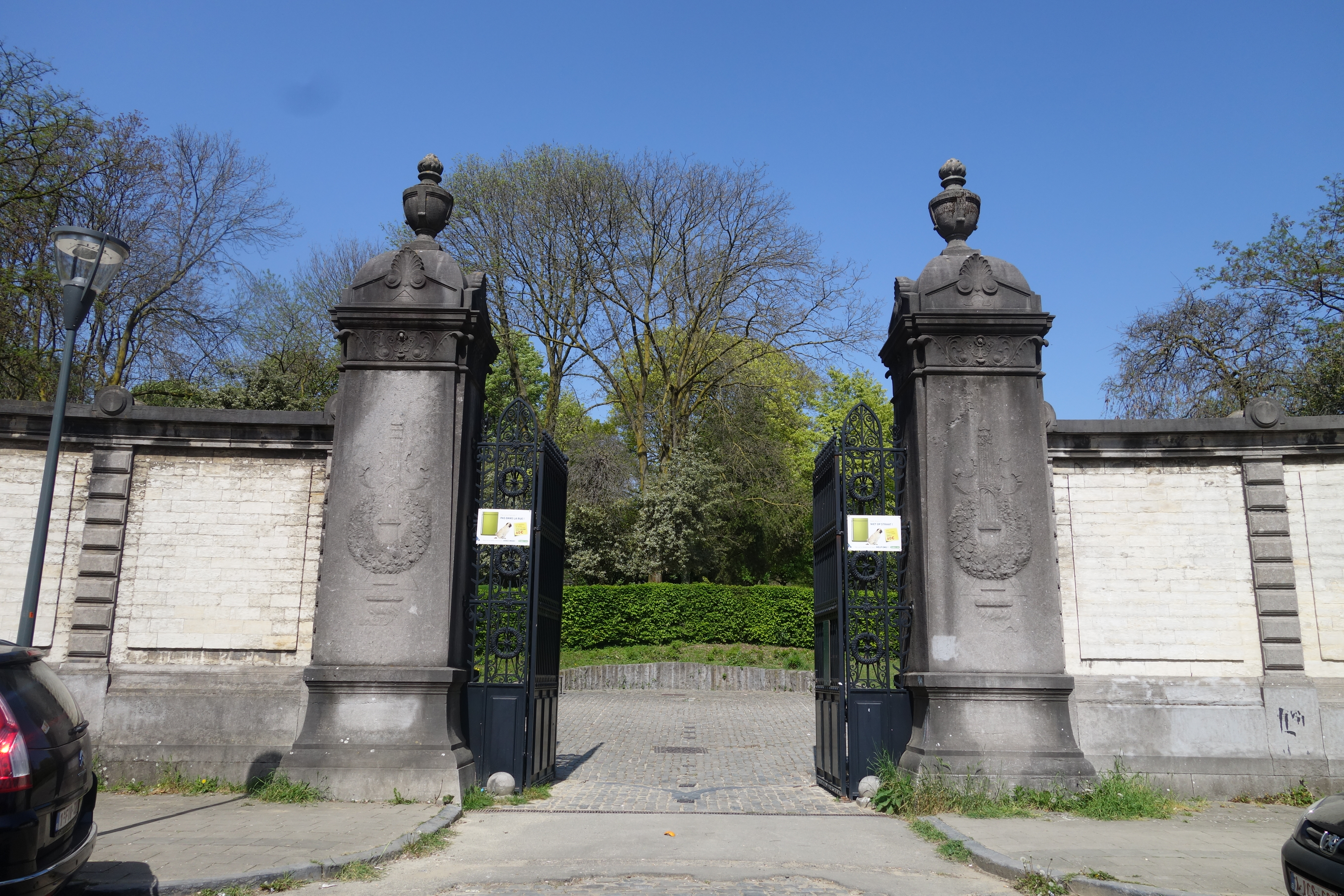
Entrance of the Parc Forestier/Bospark

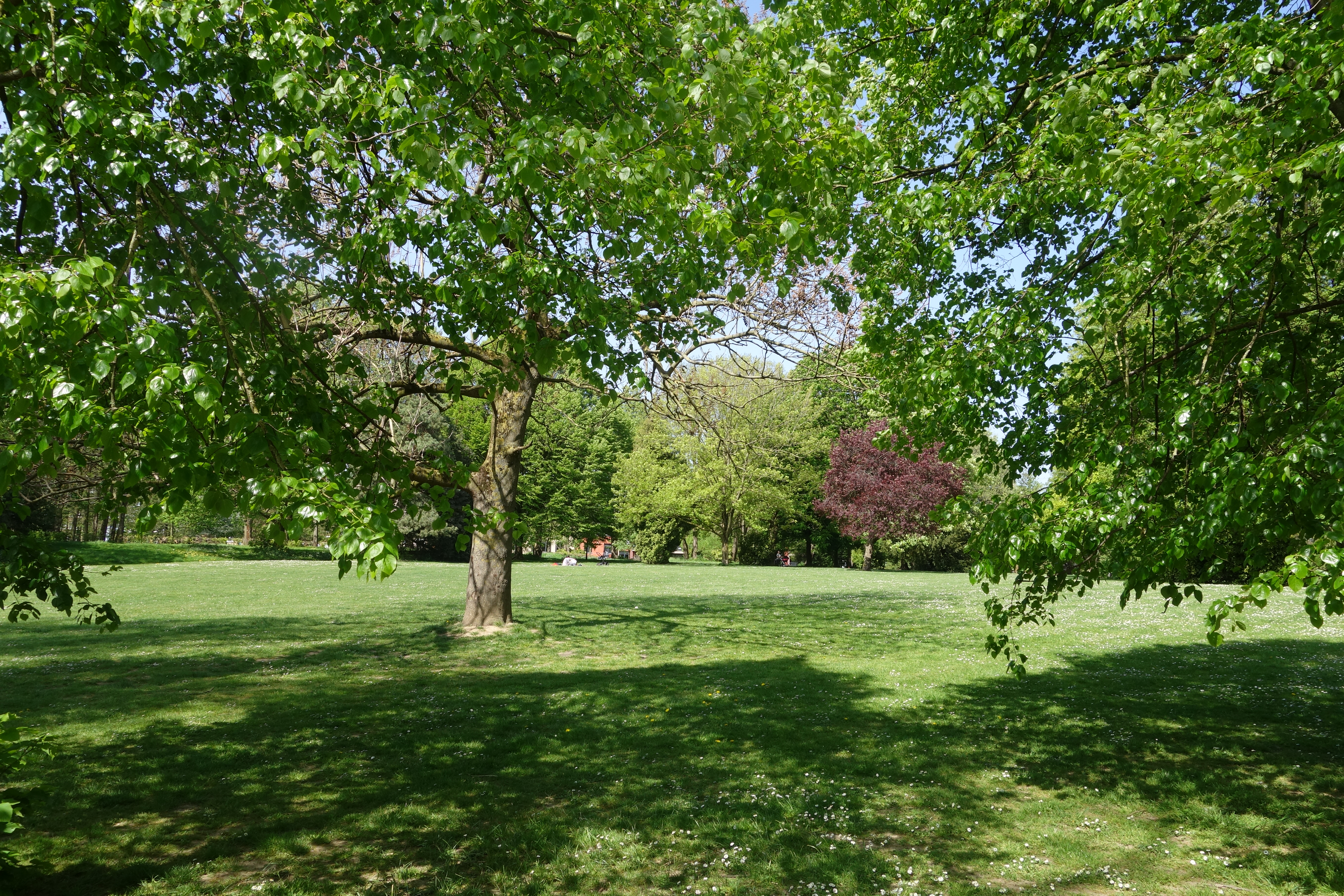
Inside the Parc Forestier

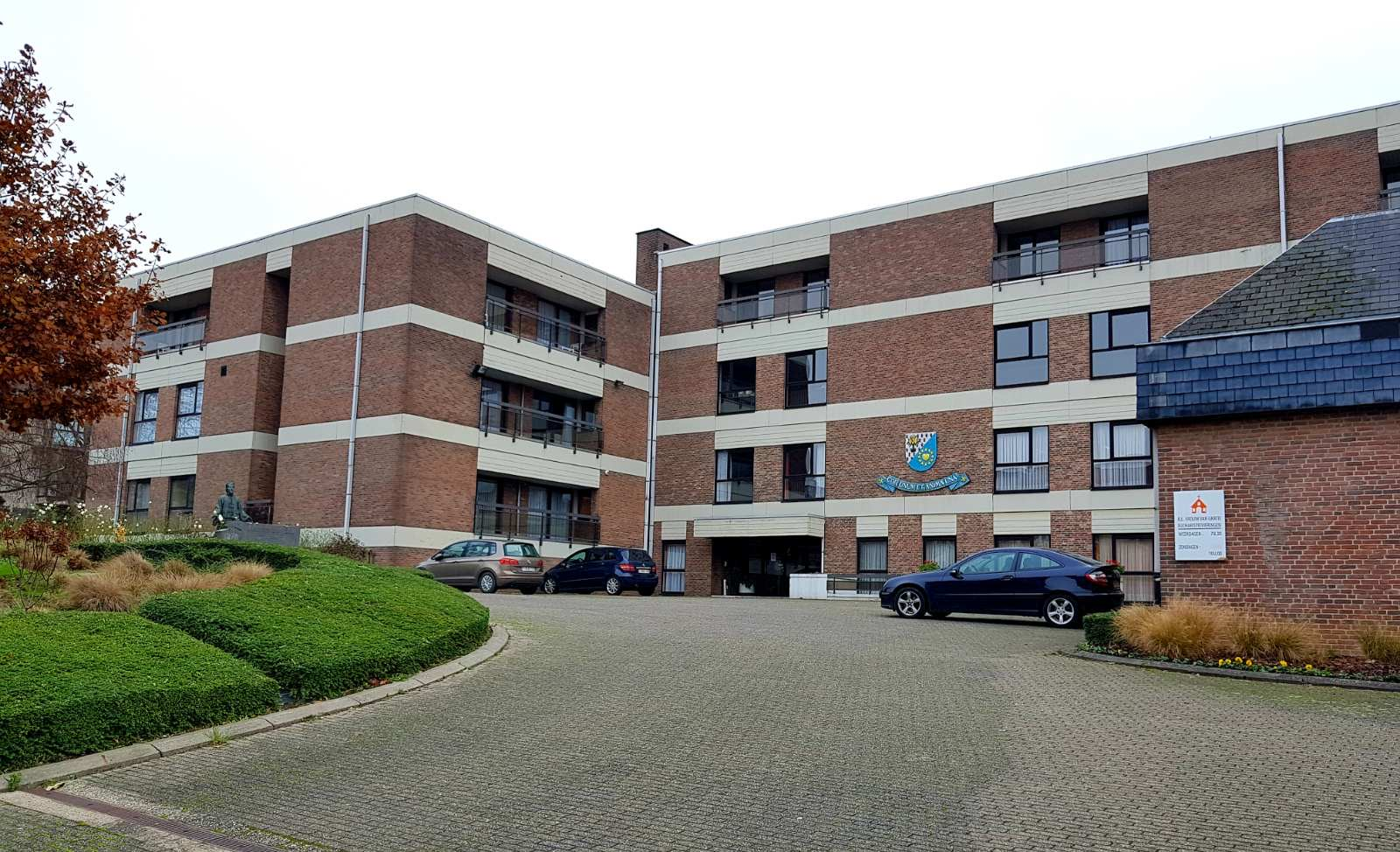
Scheut House of the CICM Missionaries

== See also ==
- Neighbourhoods in Brussels
- History of Brussels
- Belgium in the long nineteenth century
