= Les Palabres de Mboloko =

Belgian Congo short animated films

Les Palabres de Mboloko were a series of short 16mm color "animated cartoons by Africans" produced in the Belgian Congo by the priest Father Alexandre Van den Heuvel during the 1950s.

== Synopsis ==
The 10–15 minute color films are based on traditional folk tales that the director heard from the local people or found in the book Les Contes de la Brousse by M. Goebel. The hero of the series is the dwarf antelope, whose intelligence enables him always to triumph over more powerful animals. The seven short films have the following titles:

1. Malufu (Palm wine),
2. Ekolo (The basket),
3. Bokasi (Strength),
4. Etalaka (The ford),
5. Motambo (The trap),
6. Kanda (Anger), and
7. Mekana (Contest).

== Production ==
Directed by Alexandre Ven den Heuvel, the Congolese Centre for Catholic Action Cinema (C.C.A.C.C.) was a film production company established in September 1946 in the Belgian Congo by Scheutist missionaries. The C.C.A.C.C.'s had the goals of converting Africans to Christianity and of making them friendly to the Church and to Belgians. The C.C.A.C.C. had three production centers for its films: One, Edisco-Films in Leopoldville (now Kinshasa) made Les Palabres de Mboloko. The films told Christian morality stories. Father Van den Heuvel had a paternalistic attitude to Africans; he made the animated cartoons because he thought that Africans were too immature to appreciate feature films.

== Reception ==
The series was very popular. In 1965 it was censored by the President of Zaire, General Mobutu Sese Seko, who used the leopard as his emblem and who did not want people to watch films where the leopard was treated as a fool. By 1980 the cartoons had again become popular on television.

They have been called the first "African" films, despite being made by Europeans, because they incorporated elements of African folklore and music. The movies have been shown at many festivals of animated African films.
