= University of Saint Louis =

University of Saint Louis or University of St. Louis may refer to:

- University of Saint Louis Tuguegarao, Philippines
- Gaston Berger University, Senegal, formerly known as the University of Saint-Louis

== See also ==
- Universities in St. Louis, Missouri, U.S.:
  - Saint Louis University (United States)
  - Washington University in St. Louis
  - University of Missouri–St. Louis
- Saint Louis University (Philippines)
- Saint-Louis University, Brussels, Belgium
