= Ateneo de Tuguegarao =

Defunct Catholic college in Cagayan, Philippines

- Latin: Athenaea Tuguegaraoanus
- Former name: Cagayan Valley Atheneum (1938–1945)
- Motto: Latin: Credo Domine
- Motto in English: I Believe in the Lord
- Type: Private Catholic Non-profit Secondary and Tertiary education institution
- Active: 1945–1962
- Founder: Society of Jesus
- Religious affiliation: Catholic (Jesuit)
- Location: Mabini St. Ugac Sur Tuguegarao, Cagayan, Philippines; 17°37′0″N 121°43′0″E
- Campus: Urban
- Location in Luzon Location in the Philippines

The Ateneo de Tuguegarao, also referred to by its acronym AdT, was a private Catholic college ran by the Philippine Province of the Society of Jesus in Tuguegarao City, Cagayan, Philippines. It was established in 1945 when the Jesuits took over the administration of the diocesan secondary school, Cagayan Valley Atheneum. The Jesuits renamed the school Ateneo de Tuguegarao after taking control. The Jesuits were naming all the schools that they were opening at that time Ateneo. Ateneo de Tuguegarao was the fifth school in the Philippines that the Jesuits named Ateneo. Ateneo de Tuguegarao had a high school and college departments. In 1962, the school was closed when the Jesuits left Tuguegarao.

== Brief history ==
Filipinos who identified the title "Ateneo" with Jesuit schools and who knew the Latin parent, if not the meaning, of the word, were surprised and even disturbed that a new school was opening in Northern Luzon under the title of Cagayan Valley Atheneum—not conducted by the Jesuits.

The Cagayan Valley Atheneum, a secondary school, was founded by Constancio Jurgens, bishop of Tuguegarao in 1938. From its foundation until the war, it was housed in ample buildings adjoining the Cathedral of Tuguegarao. The buildings were destroyed during the fighting between the Philippine Commonwealth and Japanese forces in 1945. The school reopened in temporary structures of nipa and sawali erected in the patio of the pre-war compound. Shortly after its reopening during the school year 1945–1946, the Atheneum was committed by Bishop Jurgens to the direction of the Society of Jesus, and prior to school year 1949–1950, complete jurisdiction was transferred to the Society, due to the withdrawal of the C.I.C.M. missionaries after the war. In October 1950, the school was moved to a new site in the southwest section of Tuguegarao. Two buildings, Loyola and Xavier Halls, were completed in time for occupancy before the second semester of school year 1950–51. The classrooms, laboratories, libraries and students' chapel were situated in the Loyola Hall. Xavier Hall housed the Jesuits' quarters, students dormitory and study hall. A third building, Bellarmine Hall, was completed shortly after the beginning of the second semester and used for boarders' dining room. In 1953, an Administration building was completed.

The Ateneo de Tuguegarao had no grade school, and was an all-male school. A college department was added to the High School in June 1947. Until 1953 it had only a two-year Pre-Law course and a two-year Commerce course. In 1953, government recognition of a four-year Commerce course was obtained.

It was a small school, and the collegiate offerings were limited to Pre-Law and Commerce courses. During the early years, the college student body was almost equally divided into Pre-Law and Commerce students. The courses have been chosen with regard for local circumstances. The Commerce course would prepare the students for local business enterprises, and many of the Pre-Law students went to law schools in Manila. These Pre-Law students were encouraged by the Ateneo to attend a law school under Catholic auspices as they have received a solid foundation on their catholic faith in college. Approximately fifty percent of the High School graduates go on to college; of these approximately two thirds go to Manila, the rest continue at the Ateneo de Tuguegarao.

The Rev. Leo McGovern, S.J. was the first Jesuit Director of the Ateneo de Tuguegarao. He was succeeded in January 1947 by the Rev. Walter F. Hyland, S.J. who remained as Director until July 1948 when the Rev. Ralph M. O'Neill, S.J. was appointed Vice Rector. Father O'Neill became Rector in September 1951, until succeeded in that office in 1952 by the Rev. Rosalino Pascua, S.J. Father Pascua is to be reckoned among the "noteworthy features" of the Ateneo de Tuguegarao, for he had been active in the school since the Jesuits first came in 1946. Father Antonio Cuna was the school's rector by 1958.

The school was closed when the Jesuits left Tuguegarao in 1962.

== Epilogue ==
Many years later, the school was administered again by the CICM and became University of Saint Louis Tuguegarao.

== See also ==
- List of Jesuit educational institutions
