= Saint Louis College La Union =

Roman Catholic college in La Union, Philippines

Saint Louis College of San Fernando
- Kolehiyo ng San Luis - Siyudad ng San Fernando, La Union (Filipino)
- Former names: Father Burgos College (1948-1967)
- Motto: Sapientia Aedificat (Latin)
- Motto in English: Wisdom Builds
- Type: Private Catholic Coeducational basic and higher education institution
- Established: 1964; 62 years ago
- Founders: Msgr. Anselmo Lazo (Parish Priest of San Fernando, La Union in 1948)
- Religious affiliation: Roman Catholic (CICM Missionaries)
- Chairperson: Very Rev. Fr. Hirohito M. Bolo Jr.
- President: Rev. Fr. Roderick G. Villamar, CICM, Ph.D.
- Vice-president: Lea L. De Guzman, Ed.D. (VP for Academic Affairs); Helen R. Tugade, CPA, MDA (VP for Administration); Rev. Fr. Rumpearl Tenkings Isaac, CICM, MS Psych (VP for Mission and Identity); Rowena Kathleen H. Abalos, CPA (OIC-VP for Finance)
- Principal: Maria Magdalena M. Evangelista, MAEd
- Dean: Darel V. Mananquil, RPm, Ed.D. (College of Arts, Sciences, Technology, and Education); Caroline G. Pajimola, Ph.D. (College of Business and Accountancy); Engr. Melvin R. Esguerra, MATE (College of Engineering and Architecture); Jose J. Pangngay, RPm, RPsy, Ed.D., Ph.D. (School of Advanced Studies); Atty. Felmanda D. Camat, LL.M. (College of Law and Criminal Justice Education)
- Chaplain: Rev. Fr. Rumpearl Tenkings Isaac, CICM, MS Psych
- Location: Carlatan, San Fernando, La Union, Philippines; 16°38′12″N 120°18′48″E
- Campus: Urban
- Newspaper: The Louisian Torch
- Colors: Blue and White
- Nickname: Louisian
- Website: www.slc-sflu.edu.ph
- Location in Luzon Location in the Philippines

Saint Louis College of San Fernando, also referred to by its acronym SLC, is a private Catholic coeducational basic and higher education institution run by the Congregation of the Immaculate Heart of Mary in the City of San Fernando, La Union, Philippines. It was founded in 1964 by the CICM missionaries.

There are also sister schools of SLC, like Saint Louis University (SLU) in Baguio, University of Saint Louis Tuguegarao (USL) in Tuguegarao, Saint Louis College of Cebu in Mandaue, Saint Mary's University (Philippines) in Bayombong, Nueva Vizcaya, and Maryhill School of Theology in Quezon City.

== History ==
Saint Louis College of San Fernando, La Union, traces its roots from its humble beginnings in 1948 when Msgr. Anselmo Lazo, the parish priest then of San Fernando, La Union, founded Father Burgos College, which occupied the building just south of Saint William's Cathedral.

On the first year of operation as Fr. Burgos College, the High School Department accepted only first year and second year male enrollees. The College department on the other hand initially offered only four courses: four-year Education Course, two-year courses on Liberal arts and Commerce, and one-year Secretarial course.

In 1964, the Diocese of San Fernando turned over the ownership and management of Fr. Burgos College to the Congregation of the Immaculate Heart of Mary (CICM). Father Alfred Spincemaille, CICM was appointed as the first Rector.

In 1967, the school was renamed Saint Louis College of San Fernando and was transferred to Carlatan, San Fernando, La Union, its current location.

== Academic programs ==
=== School of Advanced Studies ===
- Doctor of Education (Ed.D.)
- Doctor of Philosophy in Management (Ph.D.)
- Master of Arts in Education (MAEd)

(majors: Educational Management, English, Filipino, Science, Mathematics, Physical Education, and Special Education)

- Master in Library and Information Science (MLIS)
- Master in Business Administration (MBA)
- Master in Public Administration (MPA)
- Master of Arts in Guidance and Counselling (MAGC)

=== College of Arts and Sciences, Technology, and Education ===
- Bachelor of Arts in English Language Studies (BAELS)
- Bachelor of Arts in Political Science (BAPOS)
- Bachelor of Science in Secondary Education (BSEd)

(majors: English, Science, Filipino, Mathematics, Social Studies, Religious & Values Education, and Physical Education)

- Bachelor in Elementary Education (BEEd)
- Bachelor in Special Needs Education (BSNE)
- Bachelor of Early Childhood Education (BECE)
- Bachelor of Physical Education (BPEd)
- Bachelor of Science in Information Technology (BSIT)
- Bachelor in Library and Information Science (BLIS)
- Bachelor of Science in Psychology (BS Psych)
- Certificate in Teaching (CIT)

=== College of Law and Criminal Justice Education ===
- Bachelor of Science in Criminology (BS Crim)
- Juris Doctor (JD)

=== College of Business and Accountancy ===
==== Accountancy ====
Programs Offered:

- Bachelor of Science in Accountancy (BSA)
- Bachelor of Science in Accounting Information System (BSAIS)
- Bachelor of Science in Management Accounting (BSMA)

==== Business Administration ====
Programs Offered:

- Bachelor of Science in Business Administration (BSBA)

(major in: Financial Management (FinMan); Human Resource Development Management (HRDM); Marketing Management (MarkMan); Operations Management (OpMan))

==== Office Administration ====
Programs Offered:

- Bachelor of Science in Office Administration (BSOA)

==== Hospitality and Tourism Management ====
Programs Offered:

- Bachelor of Science in Hospitality Management (BSHM)
- Bachelor of Science in Tourism Management (BSTM)

=== College of Engineering and Architecture ===
Programs Offered:

- Bachelor of Science in Civil Engineering (BSCE)

(Specialization: Construction Engineering and Management, and Structural Engineering)

- Bachelor of Science in Architecture (BSAr)

(Specialization: Heritage Conservation and Preservation, and Urban Planning)

=== Expanded Tertiary Education Equivalency and Accreditation Program (ETEEAP) ===
- Bachelor of Science in Office Administration (BSOA)
- Bachelor of Science in Civil Engineering (BSCE)
- Bachelor of Science in Architecture (BS Arch)

== See also ==
- Saint Louis University, Baguio
- Saint Louis College La Union, San Fernando, La Union
- University of Saint Louis Tuguegarao, Tuguegarao, Cagayan Valley
- Saint Mary's University, Bayombong, Nueva Vizcaya
