= Saint Mary's University (Philippines) =

Roman Catholic university in Nueva Vizcaya, Philippines

- Former names: Saint Mary's Elementary School (1928–1934); Saint Mary's School (1934–1947); Saint Mary's College (1947–1994)
- Motto: Sapientia a Deo (Latin)
- Motto in English: Wisdom from God
- Type: Private Catholic Research Non-profit Coeducational Basic and Higher education institution
- Established: June 1928; 98 years ago
- Founders: Fr. Achilles de Gryse, CICM
- Religious affiliation: Roman Catholic (CICM Missionary)
- Academic affiliations: PAASCU
- President: John Octavius Palina
- Vice-president: John G. Tayaban (VP for Administration) Dr. Moises Alexander Asuncion (VP for Academics) Rev. Fr. Philip Yu Jr., CICM (VP for Mission and Identity)
- Principal: Melencio G. Bernardino, Jr. (Senior High School) Dr. Zayda S. Asuncion (Junior High School)
- Students: 9,288; 1,133 (Grade School); 1080 (High School); 7075 (College)
- Location: Bayombong, Nueva Vizcaya, Philippines; 16°29′03″N 121°09′23″E
- Campus: Urban
- Colors: Blue and White
- Nickname: Marian
- Website: smu.edu.ph
- Location in Luzon Location in the Philippines

Saint Mary's University is a private Catholic higher education institution owned and operated by the Congregation of the Immaculate Heart of Mary (CICM) in Bayombong, Nueva Vizcaya, Philippines. It was founded in June 1928.

Saint Mary's University was designated as an International Center for the Study of Teaching and Learning Styles in 2004 by the International Center for the Study of Teaching and Learning Styles.

There are 9,288 students currently enrolled in the university. 1,133 of these are from the Grade School Department, 1080 from the High School, and 7075 from the college department.

Founded by CICM priest Achilles de Gryse, the institution started as an elementary school (Saint Mary's Elementary School) in June 1928. In 1934, with Godfrey Lambrecht, the High School was opened and in 1947, the College Department, offering two degrees. Gradually, the course offerings expanded with Bachelor of Science in Commerce, (1951), Bachelor of Science in Civil Engineering, (1955) and graduate degrees (1962).

== History ==
Saint Mary's University began as an elementary school initially planned by Constant Jurgens, then parish priest of Bayombong, Nueva Vizcaya. He was recalled to Europe to become the Director of the Bishop Hammer Institution in the Netherlands. Achilles de Gryse, Jurgens' successor, inaugurated the elementary school in June 1928.

In 1934, Saint Mary's High School was opened, with Fr. Godfrey Lambrecht as director and Sr. Margaretha Hermus as principal.

The collegiate department, Saint Mary's College, opened in 1947 offering programs in Associate of Arts, Bachelor of Science in Education, Bachelor of Arts, and Junior Normal.

Gradually, the course offerings expanded with Bachelor of Science in Commerce (1951), Bachelor of Science in Civil Engineering (1955), and the Graduate programs (1962).

In 1967, the Belgian CICM Missionaries took over the ownership and management of Saint Mary's College. The college built a campus on the Magat River in 1968. The college was transferred to its new site in 1969.

Saint Mary's College was granted university status under the presidency of John Van Bauwel and became known as Saint Mary's University.

== Academics ==
=== Basic education ===
Saint Mary's University offers preschool education and covers six year-levels of grade school education.

Saint Mary's University also offers regular junior high school and science high school education.

=== Undergraduate ===
The School of Accountancy and Business (SAB), formerly College of Accountancy and Economics, was established in 1999. The Center for Entrepreneurial Development and Research is the extension and research arm of the School.

The School of Teacher Education and Humanities (STEH), was founded in 1947 and designated as Center of Excellence in Teacher Education and Focus Institution for Project in Basic Education (PROBE).

The School of Engineering, Architecture and Information Technology (SEAIT)

The School of Health and Natural Sciences (SHaNS), formerly School of Health Sciences. The Center for Natural Sciences manages and operates the science laboratories and the Tissue Culture Laboratory.

=== Post-graduate ===
The College of Law, established in 1996.

=== Graduate ===
The School of Graduate Studies, was formally opened in 1962.

== Achievements and recognitions ==
- Ranked Superior in Teacher Education, Very Good in Business Education and Good in Public Service Administration in the Evaluation of Graduate Education in the Philippines (EGEP) by CHED, October 5, 2000
- Granted Full Autonomous status by the Commission on Higher Education on A.Y 2016-2017 from April 1, 2016, to May 31, 2019
- Recognized as Top 7 Pharmacist School (with 10 or more examinees) in June 2021
- Recognized as Top 1 Nursing school in the Philippines with a 100% passing rate in November 2024

== See also ==
- Saint Louis University, Baguio, Benguet
- Saint Louis College La Union, San Fernando City, La Union
- University of Saint Louis Tuguegarao, Tuguegarao City, Cagayan Valley
