= Anderlecht =

Municipality of the Brussels-Capital Region, Belgium

- Municipality
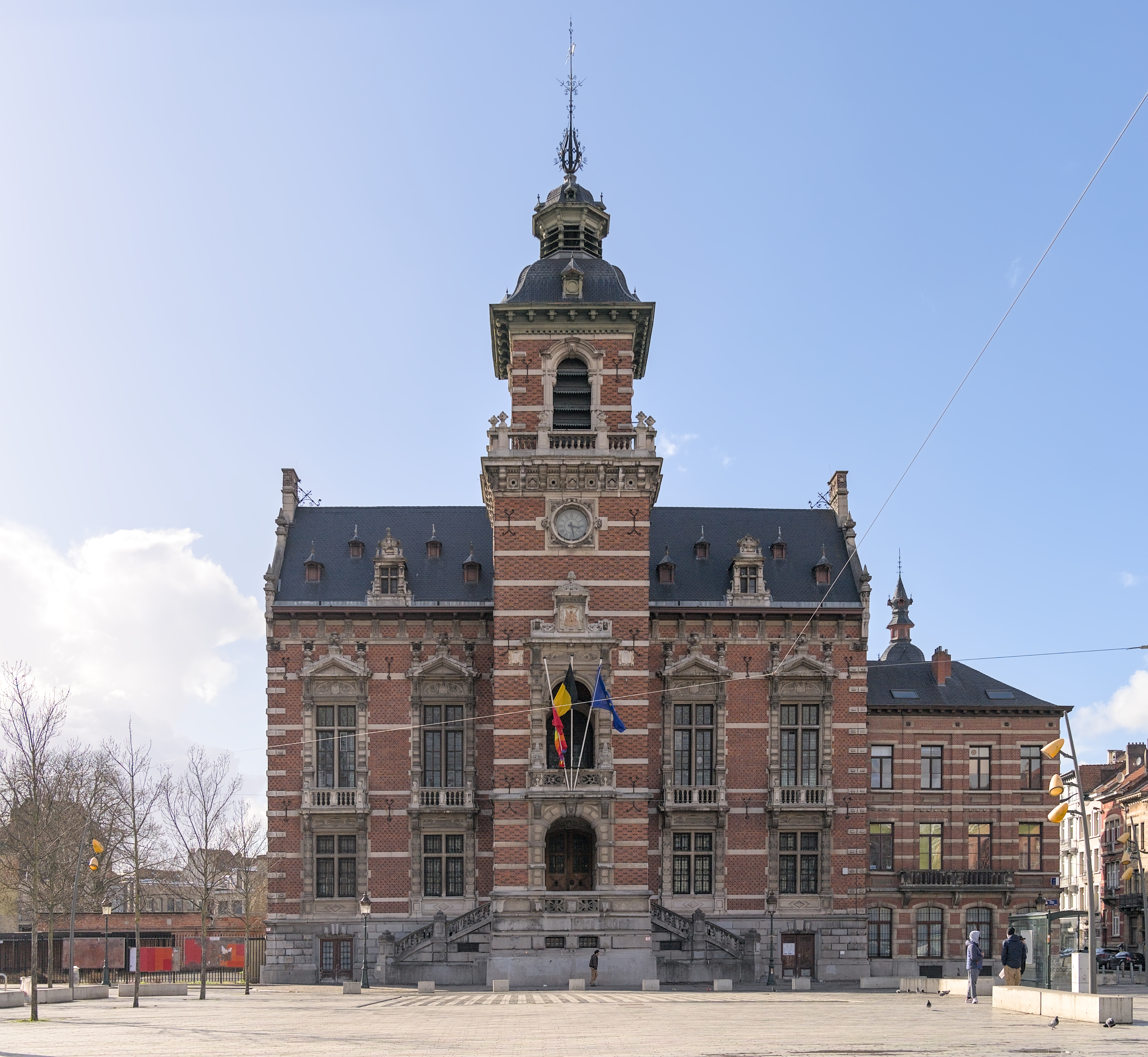
- Anderlecht's Municipal Hall seen from the Place du Conseil/Raadsplein

- Flag Coat of arms

- Anderlecht municipality in the Brussels-Capital Region
- Interactive map of Anderlecht
- Location in Belgium
- Coordinates: 50°50′N 04°20′E
- Country: Belgium
- Community: Flemish Community; French Community
- Region: Brussels-Capital
- Arrondissement: Brussels-Capital

Government
  - Mayor: Fabrice Cumps (PS)
  - Governing party: PS-Vooruit - Les Engagés-CD&V - MR-OpenVLD

Area
  - Total: 17.91 km^{2} (6.92 sq mi)

Population (2020-01-01)
  - Total: 120,887
  - Density: 6,750/km^{2} (17,480/sq mi)
- Postal codes: 1070
- NIS code: 21001
- Area codes: 02
- Website: anderlecht.be/fr (in French) anderlecht.be/nl (in Dutch)

Anderlecht (French: [ɑ̃dœʁlɛkt]; Dutch: [ˈɑndərlɛxt]) is one of the 19 municipalities of the Brussels-Capital Region, Belgium. Located in the south-western part of the region, it is bordered by the City of Brussels, Forest, Molenbeek-Saint-Jean, and Saint-Gilles, as well as the Flemish municipalities of Dilbeek and Sint-Pieters-Leeuw. Like all municipalities in Brussels, it is officially bilingual (French–Dutch).

There are several historically and architecturally distinct districts within Anderlecht. As of 1 January 2024, the municipality had a population of 126,581 inhabitants. The total area is 17.91 km^{2} (6.92 sq mi), which gives a population density of 7,066/km^{2} (18,300/sq mi). Its upper area is greener and less densely populated.

== History ==
=== Origins and medieval times ===
The first traces of human activity on the right bank of the Senne date from the Stone Age and Bronze Age. The remnants of a Roman villa and of a Frankish necropolis were also found on the territory of Anderlecht. The first mention of the name Anderlecht, however, dates only from 1047 under the forms Anrelech, then Andrelet (1111), Andreler (1148), and Anderlech (1186). At that time, this community was already home to a chapter of canons and to two feudal manors, those of the powerful lords of Aa and of Anderlecht.

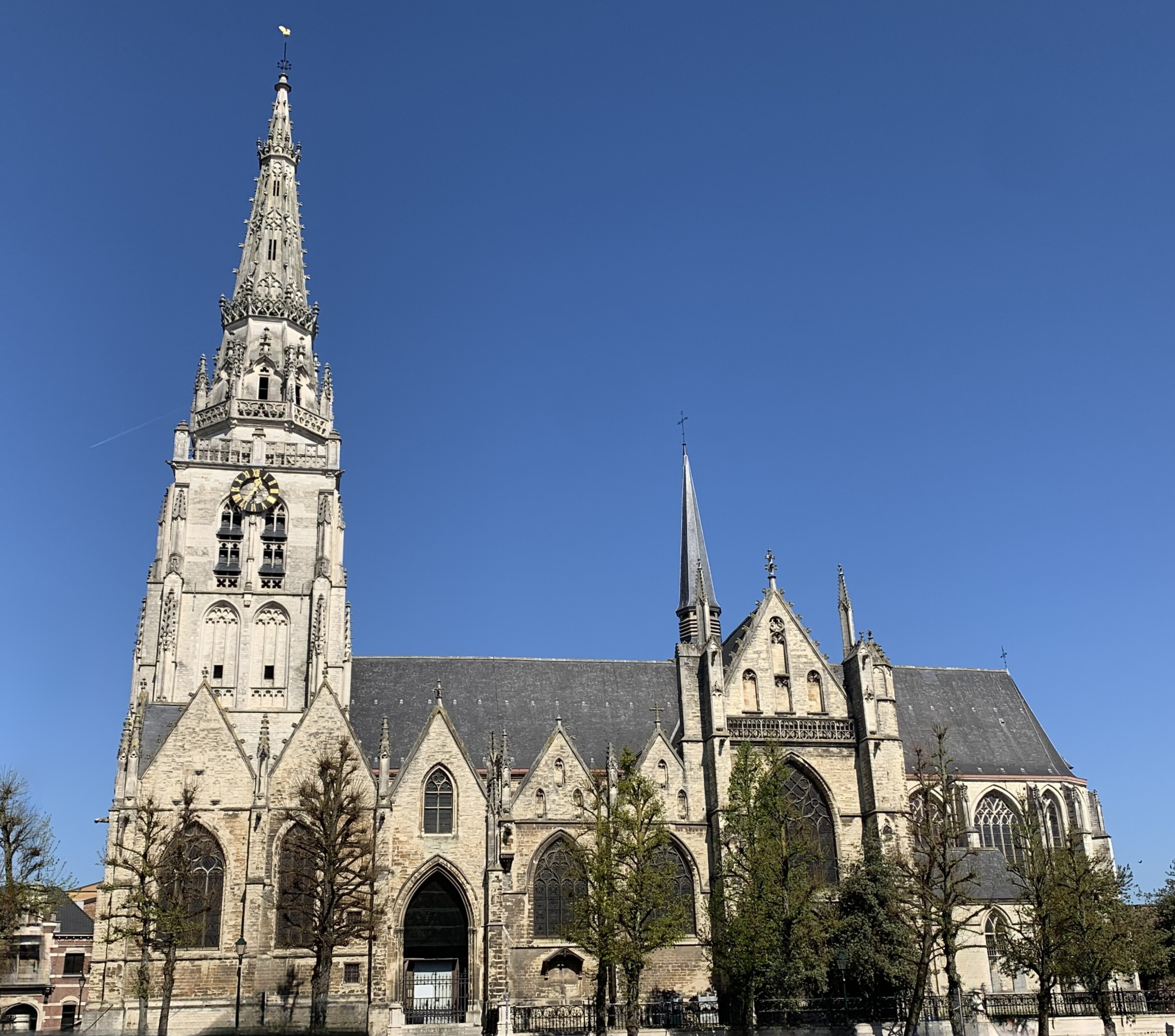
Collegiate Church of St. Peter and St. Guido

In 1356, the Count of Flanders, Louis II, fought against Brussels on the territory of Anderlecht, in the so-called Battle of Scheut, supposedly over a monetary matter. Although he defeated his sister-in-law, the Duchess of Brabant, Joanna, and briefly took her title, she regained it the following year with the help of the Holy Roman Emperor, Charles IV. In 1393, Joanna's charter made Anderlecht a part of Brussels. It is also around this time that the church of Saint Guy was rebuilt in Brabantine Gothic style above an earlier Romanesque crypt.

=== 15th–18th centuries ===
The village of Anderlecht became a beacon of culture in the 15th and 16th centuries. In 1521, the Dutch humanist writer and theologian Erasmus of Rotterdam stayed in the canons' house for a few months. Charles, Duke of Aumale and Grand Veneur of France also had a residence there.

The 17th and 18th centuries were marked by the wars between the Low Countries and France. During the Nine Years' War, it is from the high ground of Scheut, in the northern part of Anderlecht, that the bombardment of Brussels of 1695 took place. Together with the resulting fire, it was the most destructive event in the entire history of Brussels. On 13 November 1792, right after the Battle of Jemappes, General Dumouriez and the French Revolutionary army routed the Austrians there once again. Among the consequences were the disbanding of the canons and Anderlecht being proclaimed an independent municipality by the French.

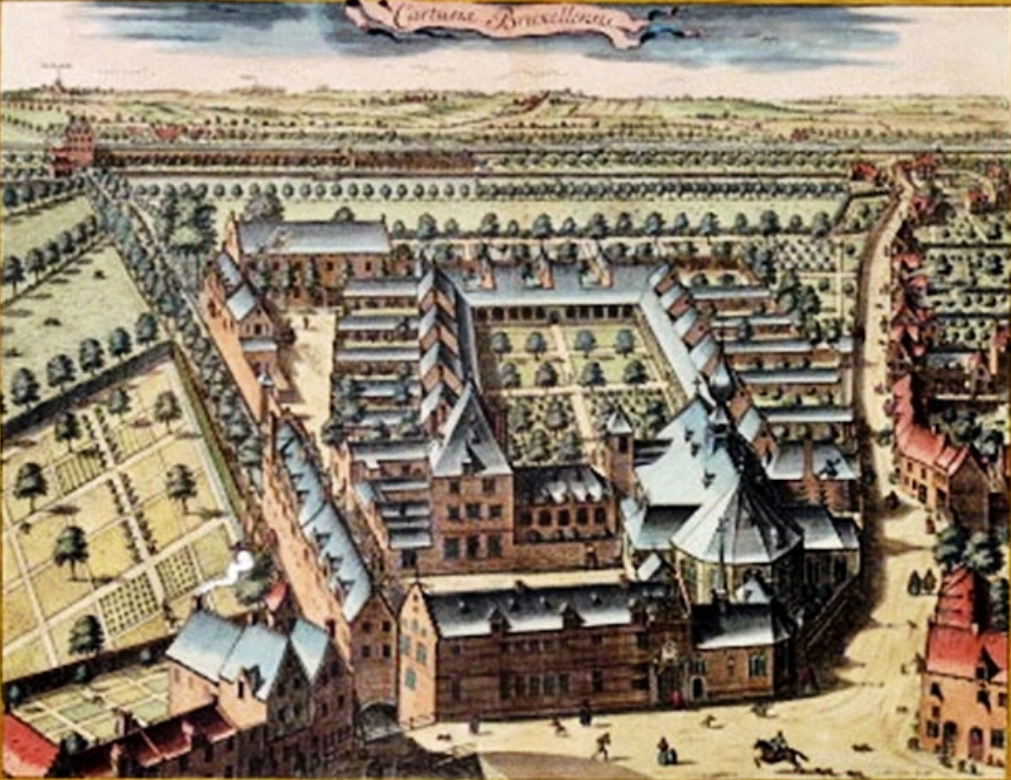
The Carthusian Monastery depicted in Chorographia Sacra Brabantiae (1727). On the horizon are Anderlecht and Scheut.

By the end of the 18th century, Anderlecht including its dependencies, which extended to Brussels' city walls, counted around 2,000 inhabitants. In Scheut, on the site of the Carthusian Monastery, stood a chapel called Our Lady of Scheut, whose pleasant location, in the middle of a grove, made this place very popular at the time.

=== 19th century and later ===
The 19th century saw a remarkable population growth, mainly because of the proximity to a rapidly expanding Brussels. The Chaussée de Ninove/Ninoofsesteenweg was laid out in 1828, through the former property of the Carthusians. The population multiplied by ten between 1830 and 1890 and doubled again between 1890 and 1910. Along the Chaussée de Mons/Bergensesteenweg and the Brussels–Charleroi Canal, a series of industrial and working-class districts connected the centre of Anderlecht to Cureghem.

Remarkable new urban developments and garden cities such as La Roue/Het Rad, Moortebeek and Bon Air/Goede Lucht were built at the beginning of the 20th century to house the influx of newcomers. Following World War II, some remaining green parts of the municipality also made way for large-scale urban renewal following the modernist Athens Charter and Park system, such as the housing projects Scherdemael, Peterbos and Marius Renard in the upper town, and Aurore near the canal.

== Geography ==
=== Location ===
Location of Anderlecht within Brussels

Anderlecht is located in the north-central part of Belgium, about 110 kilometres (68 mi) from the Belgian coast and about 180 km (110 mi) from Belgium's southern tip. It is located in the heartland of the Brabantian Plateau, about 45 km (28 mi) south of Antwerp (Flanders), and 50 km (31 mi) north of Charleroi (Wallonia). It is the westernmost municipality in the Brussels-Capital Region and is an important crossing point for the Brussels–Charleroi Canal, which cuts the municipality in two from the west. With an area of 17.91 km^{2} (6.92 sq mi), it is also the third largest municipality in the region after the City of Brussels and Uccle. It is bordered by the City of Brussels, Forest, Molenbeek-Saint-Jean, and Saint-Gilles, as well as the Flemish municipalities of Dilbeek and Sint-Pieters-Leeuw.

=== Climate ===
Anderlecht, in common with the rest of Brussels, experiences an oceanic climate (Köppen: Cfb) with warm summers and cool winters. Proximity to coastal areas influences the area's climate by sending marine air masses from the Atlantic Ocean. Nearby wetlands also ensure a maritime temperate climate. On average (based on measurements in the period 1991–2020), there are approximately 130 days of rain per year in the region. It also often experiences violent thunderstorms in the summer months.

Climate data for Anderlecht (1991−2020 normals)
Month	Jan	Feb	Mar	Apr	May	Jun	Jul	Aug	Sep	Oct	Nov	Dec	Year
Mean daily maximum °C (°F)	6.7 (44.1)	7.7 (45.9)	11.5 (52.7)	15.7 (60.3)	19.2 (66.6)	22.0 (71.6)	24.1 (75.4)	23.9 (75.0)	20.3 (68.5)	15.6 (60.1)	10.4 (50.7)	7.0 (44.6)	15.3 (59.5)
Daily mean °C (°F)	3.8 (38.8)	4.2 (39.6)	7.0 (44.6)	10.2 (50.4)	13.8 (56.8)	16.8 (62.2)	18.9 (66.0)	18.5 (65.3)	15.2 (59.4)	11.4 (52.5)	7.2 (45.0)	4.3 (39.7)	11.0 (51.8)
Mean daily minimum °C (°F)	0.9 (33.6)	0.7 (33.3)	2.6 (36.7)	4.6 (40.3)	8.5 (47.3)	11.6 (52.9)	13.6 (56.5)	13.1 (55.6)	10.1 (50.2)	7.2 (45.0)	4.0 (39.2)	1.6 (34.9)	6.6 (43.9)
Average precipitation mm (inches)	70.9 (2.79)	61.6 (2.43)	55.4 (2.18)	45.4 (1.79)	58.1 (2.29)	69.6 (2.74)	72.1 (2.84)	84.9 (3.34)	63.5 (2.50)	66.6 (2.62)	74.5 (2.93)	86.9 (3.42)	809.6 (31.87)
Average precipitation days (≥ 1.0 mm)	12.2	11.4	10.9	9.2	10.3	9.8	10.1	10.3	9.7	10.7	12.1	13.4	130.1
Mean monthly sunshine hours	61	75	129	178	204	205	210	198	158	116	68	50	1,649
Source: Royal Meteorological Institute

== Districts ==
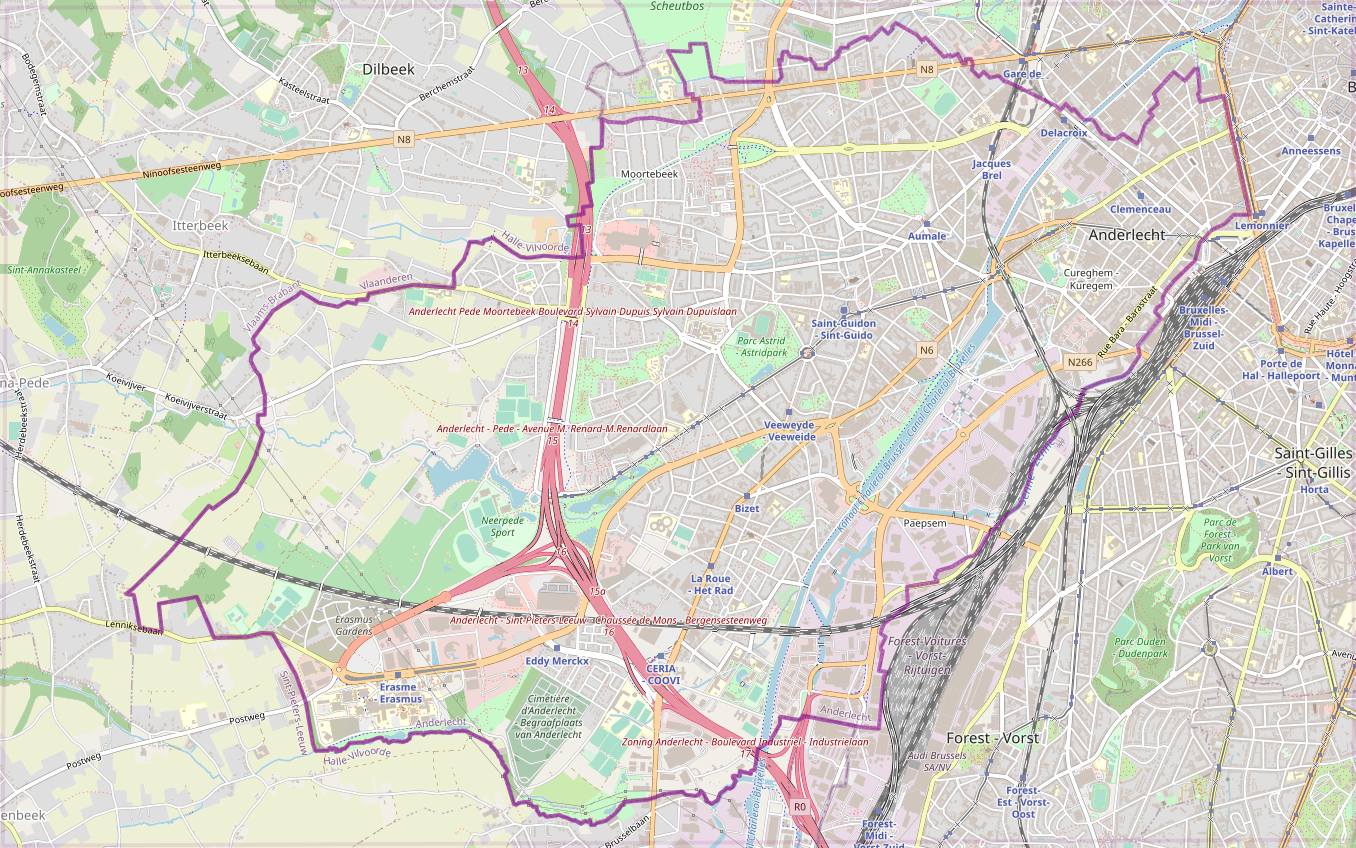
Map of Anderlecht

The territory of Anderlecht is very heterogeneous and is characterised by a mixture of larger districts including smaller residential and (formerly) industrial neighbourhoods. The area along the canal is currently experiencing a large revitalisation programme, as part of the Plan Canal of the Brussels-Capital Region.

=== Historical centre ===
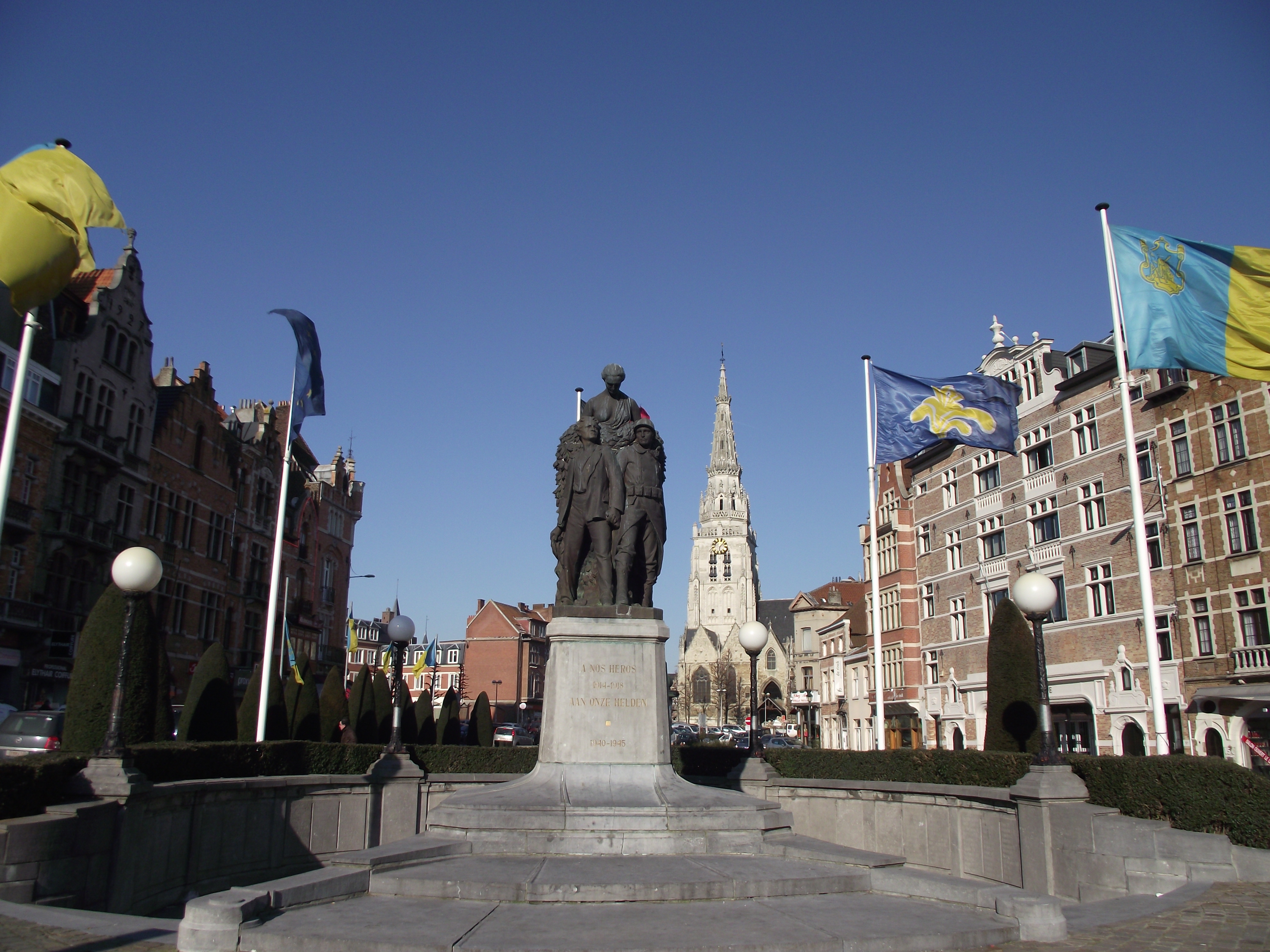
A view of the Place de la Vaillance / Dapperheidsplein with the Church of St. Guido in the background

The historical centre of Anderlecht is the municipality's central district. Formerly known as Rinck, it is divided into several sectors:

- The Saint-Guidon/Sint Guido district, also called the Vaillance/Dapperheid district, is the meeting point for those who hail to the heart of Anderlecht. It is also where the Place de la Vaillance/Dapperheidsplein (Anderlecht's central square), the Church of St. Guido, the Place de Linde/De Lindeplein, as well as Anderlecht's main schools are located. The Rue Wayez/Wayezstraat is the municipality's main shopping street. It is centred on the Place of the Resistance/Verzetsplein and some neighbouring streets.
- The smaller Aumale district in its northern part mainly comprises the Rue d'Aumale/Aumalestraat and its surrounding streets. It includes the Erasmus House (a museum devoted to the Dutch humanist writer and theologian Erasmus of Rotterdam), the old beguinage (a late medieval lay convent, now a museum dedicated to religious community life), as well as the Bibliothèque de l'Espace Maurice Carême French-language public library.

=== Cureghem/Kuregem ===
Located in the north-east of Anderlecht, Cureghem/Kuregem is one of the municipality's largest and most populated districts. It developed during the Industrial Revolution along the Brussels–Charleroi Canal and is currently in a fragile social and economic situation due to the decline of its economy and the poor quality of some of its housing. Between 1836 and 1991, the district housed the Royal School of Veterinary Medicine, now moved to Liège but often still referred to as Cureghem. The old campus, listed as protected heritage, has undergone a large rehabilitation process. Three listed buildings—the former Atlas Brewery, the old power station, and the former Moulart Mill—are testaments to the old industrial activities next to the waterway. The Municipal Hall of Anderlecht is located on the Place du Conseil/Raadsplein, in the heart of this district. In its lower part, bordering the City of Brussels, are the Square de l'Aviation/Luchtvaartsquare and the Parc de la Rosée/Dauwpark.

=== Meir ===
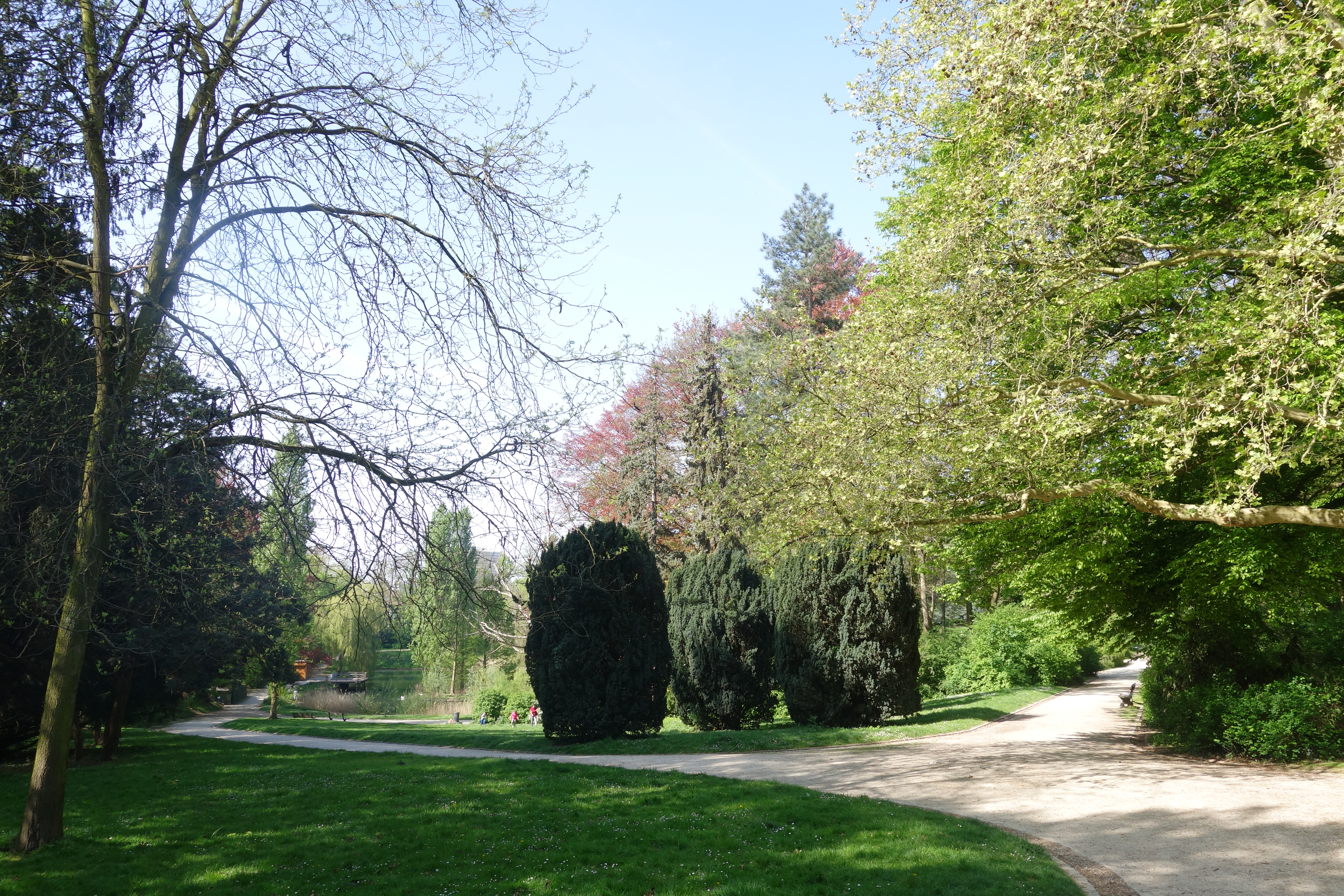
Astrid Park

Located to the south of the historical centre of Anderlecht, this district is centred on the Meir Roundabout and Astrid Park, where the football club RSC Anderlecht plays its home matches in the Constant Vanden Stock Stadium. Planned shortly before the First World War, the development of this residential neighbourhood took place mainly between the two world wars. Its layout, characterised by broad avenues, villas and row houses interspersed with green spaces, reflects the planned transition from former rural land into an urbanised residential zone. Aimed at the middle class, it forms an extremely coherent and well-preserved architectural ensemble in which the Art Deco style predominates.

=== Veeweyde/Veeweide ===
Veeweyde/Veeweide is centrally located in the upper part of Anderlecht, south of the Meir district. The neighbourhood, which takes its name from an old hamlet meaning "pasture", includes the Busselenberg (a residential area centred around the park of the same name), the smaller Musicians' district (a residential area between the Chaussée de Mons/Bergensesteenweg and the Rue Félicien Rops/Félicien Ropsstraat), as well as the Aurore housing estate on the banks of the canal. In recent years, this area has seen urban renewal efforts, with the canal quays being converted into a pedestrian and cycle-friendly promenade.

=== La Roue/Het Rad ===
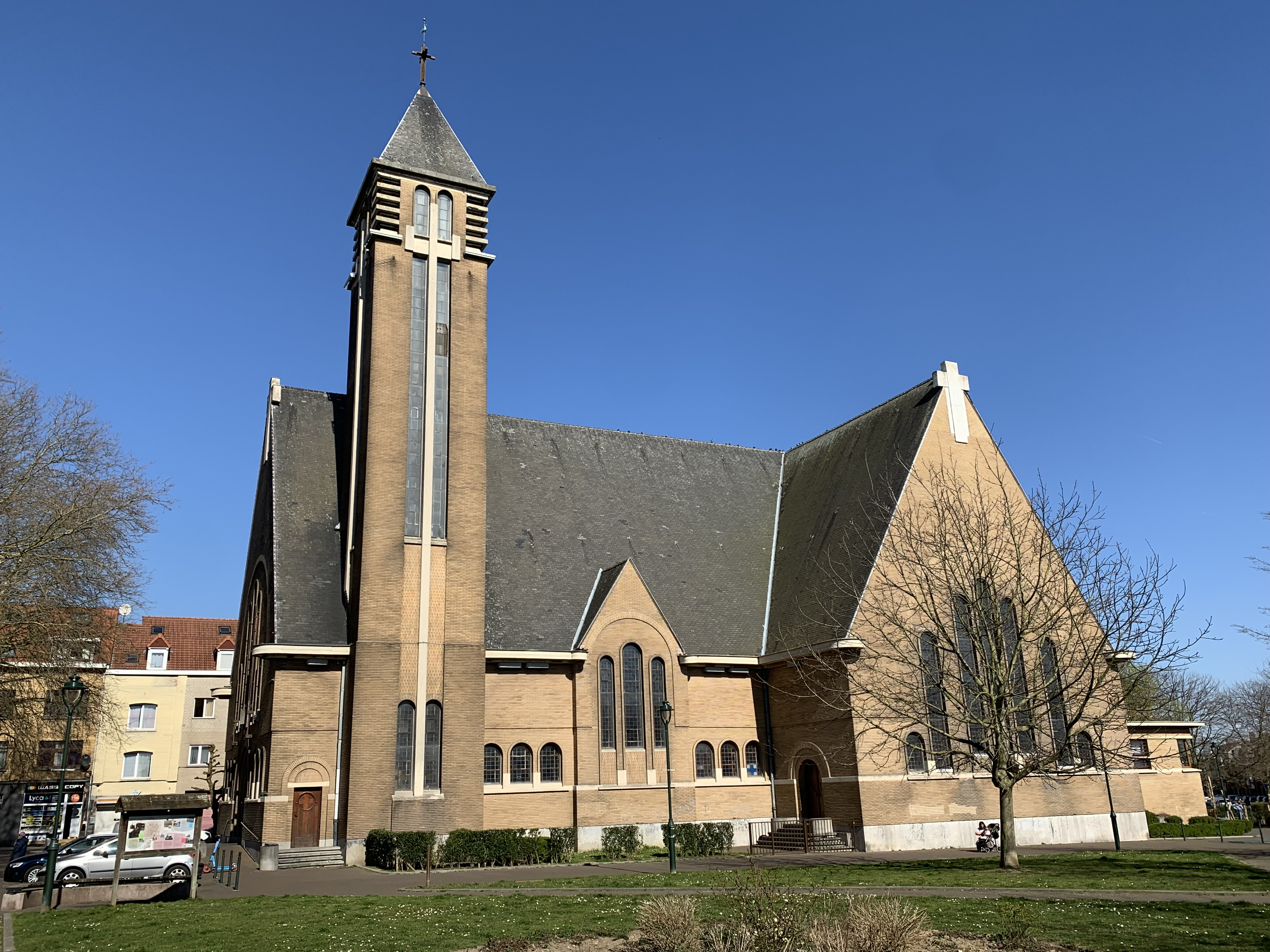
Church of St. Joseph in La Roue/Het Rad

Located in the south of Anderlecht, La Roue/Het Rad ("The Wheel") is one of the municipality's largest districts and one of Brussels' main garden cities. It is crossed by the last end of the Chaussée de Mons in Brussels, and is bounded to the east by the Brussels–Charleroi Canal and to the south by the Flemish municipality of Sint-Pieters-Leeuw, in the Pajottenland. Mostly built in the 1920s, with its modest and picturesque houses, it offers a vision of an early 20th-century working-class neighbourhood. At its southern edge, it is also home to one of the largest agribusiness industry campuses in Belgium: the Food and Chemical Industries Education and Research Center (CERIA/COOVI), as well as large department stores.

=== Scheut ===
Located in the north of Anderlecht, Scheut is bounded by the border with the municipality of Molenbeek-Saint-Jean to the north, the historical centre of Anderlecht to the south, the Birmingham district to the east, the Scheutveld district to the west and the semi-natural site of the Scheutbos to the north-west. Historically, the Scheut Plateau held strategic importance and later evolved into a largely residential and commercial zone. It is in this district, on the Chaussée de Ninove/Ninoofsesteenweg, that lay the foundations of the Scheutveld College, on 28 April 1863, by the Catholic priest Theophile Verbist. The congregation of Scheut Missionaries went on to evangelise China, Mongolia, the Philippines, as well as the Congo Free State/Belgian Congo (modern-day Democratic Republic of the Congo).

== Main sights ==
Anderlecht has a rich cultural and architectural heritage. Some of the main points of interest include:

- The Municipal Hall of Anderlecht, located on the Place du Conseil/Raadsplein, designed in neo-Flemish Renaissance style by the architect Jules-Jacques Van Ysendyck, which was opened in 1879.
- The Collegiate Church of St. Peter and St. Guido, located in the municipality's historical centre, on the northern side of the Place de la Vaillance/Dapperheidsplein, its main square. Its Romanesque crypt dates from the 10th century and is one of the oldest in Belgium. It contains a very old tombstone considered to be the grave of the 11th-century Saint Guy. Most of the church, however, dates from around 1350 and later, with most of the currently visible architecture representing the Ogee style (15th–16th centuries). Construction of the tower started in 1517 but ceased with the square part up to the balcony, and was not completed until 1898.
- The Erasmus House, built between 1460 and 1515, with its medicinal and philosophical gardens, which can be visited nearby. Right next to the church, the old beguinage is home to a local history museum. Both institutions are now managed jointly as the Erasmus House & Beguinage Museums.
- The Synagogue of Anderlecht, an Orthodox synagogue designed in Art Deco style by the architect Joseph de Lange and completed in 1933.
- The National Memorial to the Jewish Martyrs of Belgium, a monument commemorating the 24,600 Belgian Jewish martyrs of World War II, designed by the architects André Godart and Odon Dupire, and completed in 1970. It is located in the centre of the Square des Martyrs Juifs/Joodse-Martelarensquare, which was created for the occasion.
- The National Museum of the Resistance, which traces the history of the Belgian Resistance and German occupation of Belgium during World War II.
- The Museum of China – Scheut, which houses documents and pieces brought back to Europe by the congregation of Scheut Missionaries, including a 15th-century bronze Buddha.
- The Maurice Carême Museum, in the Maison blanche where the Belgian poet lived and wrote.
- The Luizenmolen in Neerpede, a replica of an old windmill which once stood on the site.
- The Cureghem Cellars (French: Caves de Cureghem, Dutch: Kelders van Kuregem), a subterranean complex of handmade brick caves with vaults, pillars, and arches, originally the site of a cattle market covered by a forged iron roof in the 1890s. The cellars were simply a foundation for the upper structure until the 1930s, when the city council decided to make better use of them. It proved more profitable to grow mushrooms in the dark and damp underground spaces for local consumption. It fell into disuse as a cattle market but, in 1984, the hall was officially listed as a Belgian monument. Due to its characteristic architecture and unique layout, it was refurbished and transformed by a private company, Abattoir SA. Since 1992, it has served as an event site. One of these was the anatomic exposition Body Worlds (German: Körperwelten) by Gunther Von Hagens, which ran in the cellars between 2008 and 2009 and attracted over 500,000 visitors.
- The Cantillon Brewery, a gueuze museum established in an actual working brewery.
- The Museum of Medicine, located on the Erasme/Erasmus campus of the Université libre de Bruxelles (ULB).
- The Jean-Claude Van Damme statue, located on the Boulevard Sylvain Dupuis/Sylvain Dupuislaan, near the Westland Shopping Center.
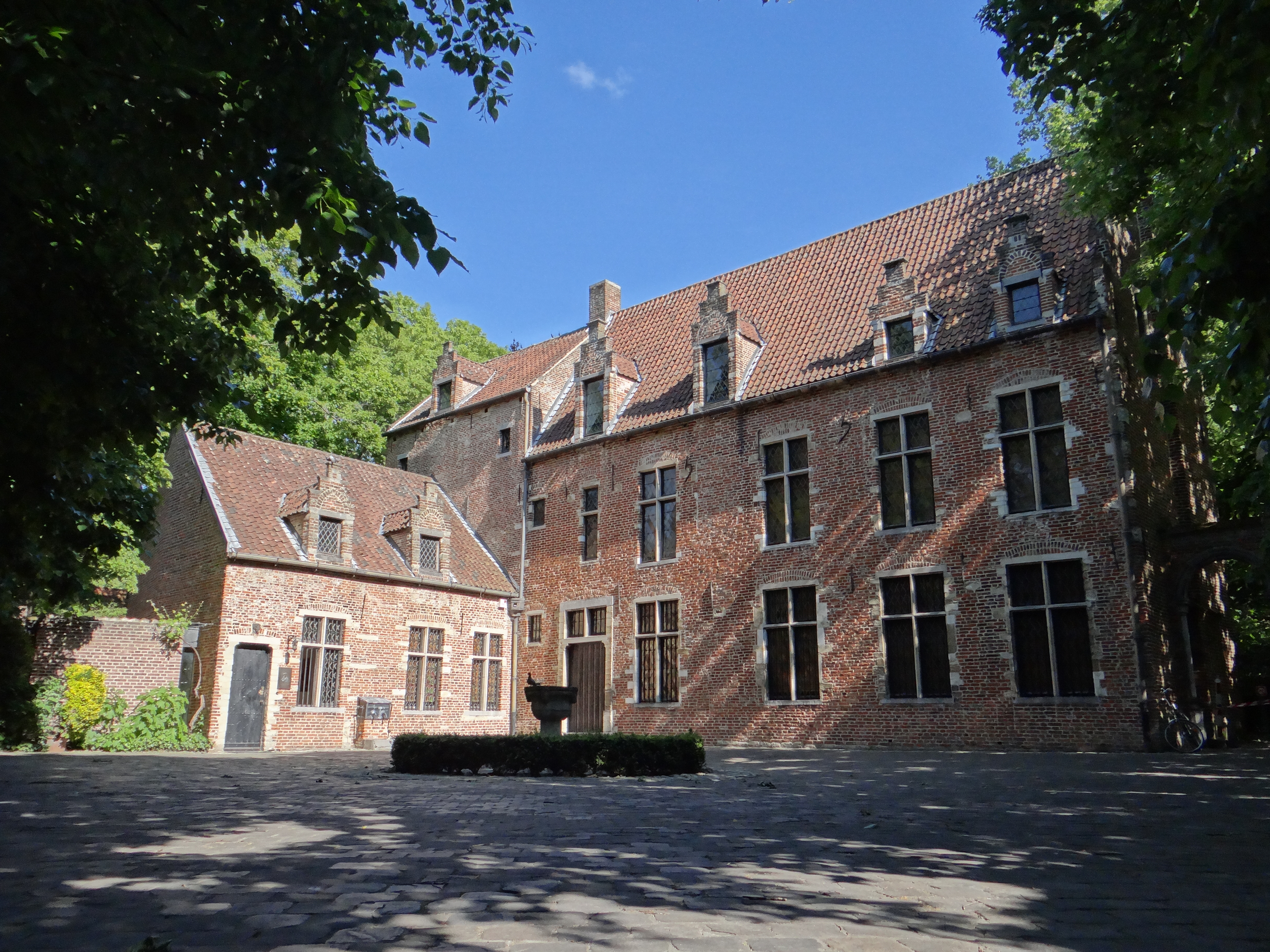
Erasmus House

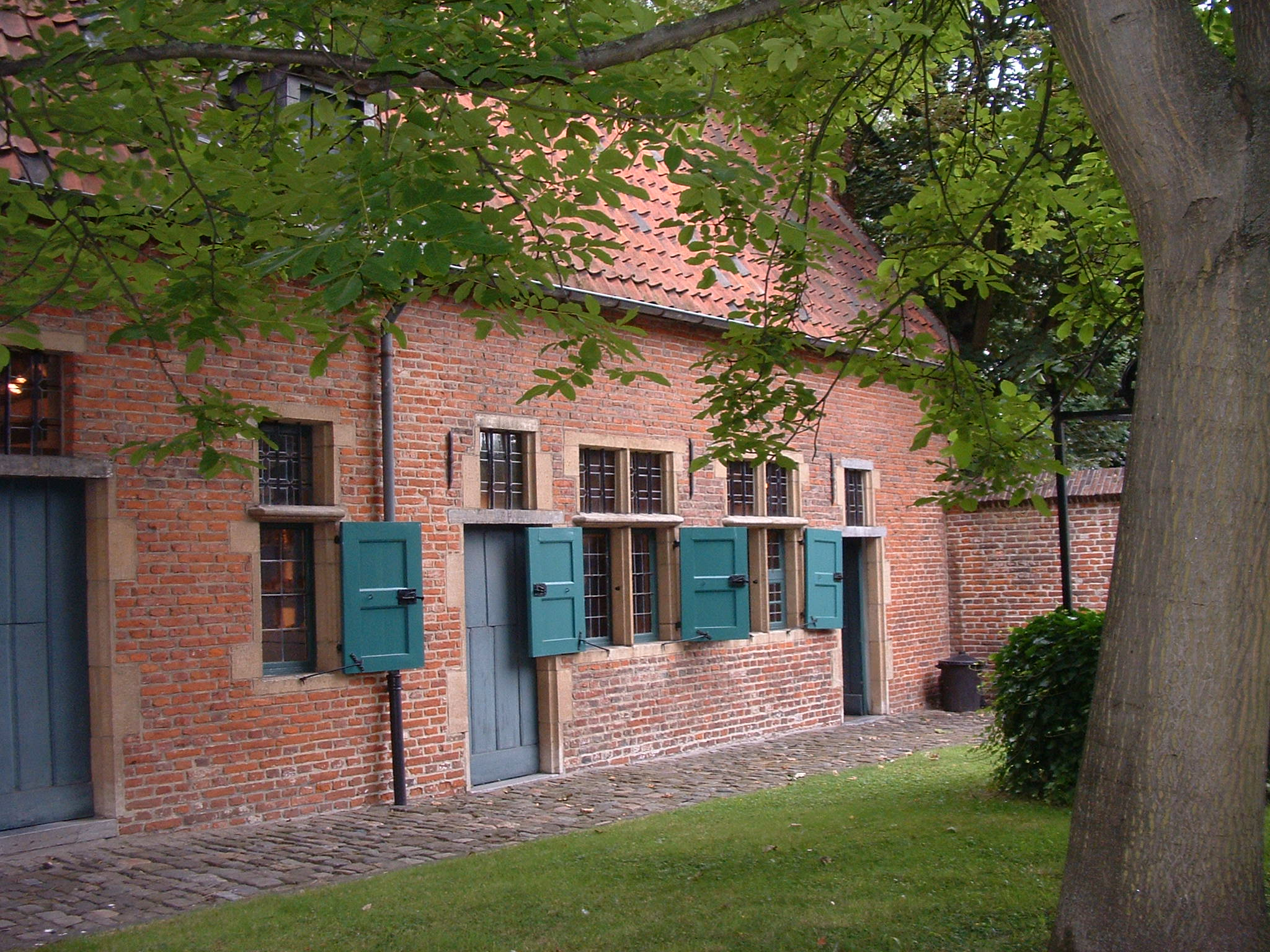
Beguinage of Anderlecht

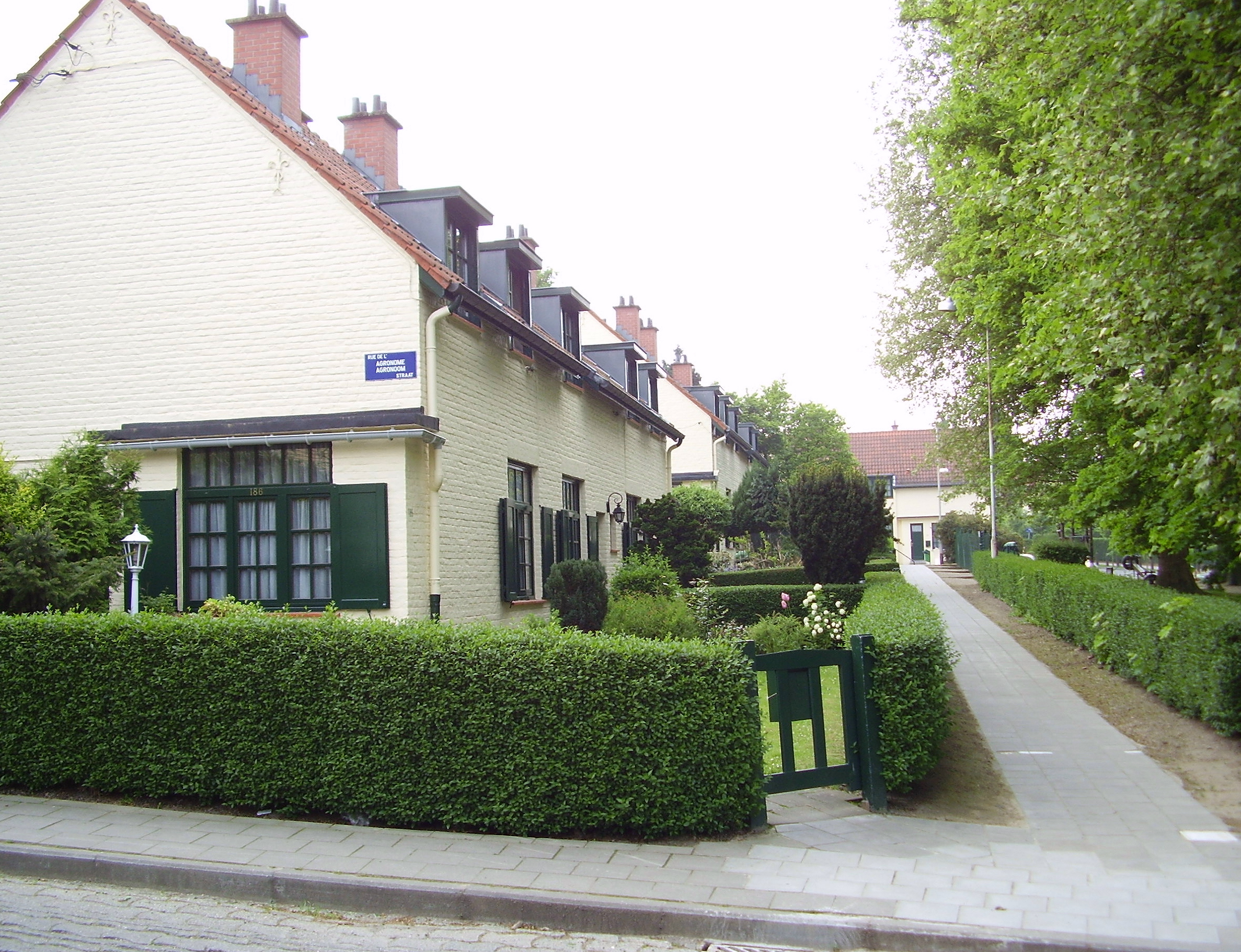
Moortebeek garden city

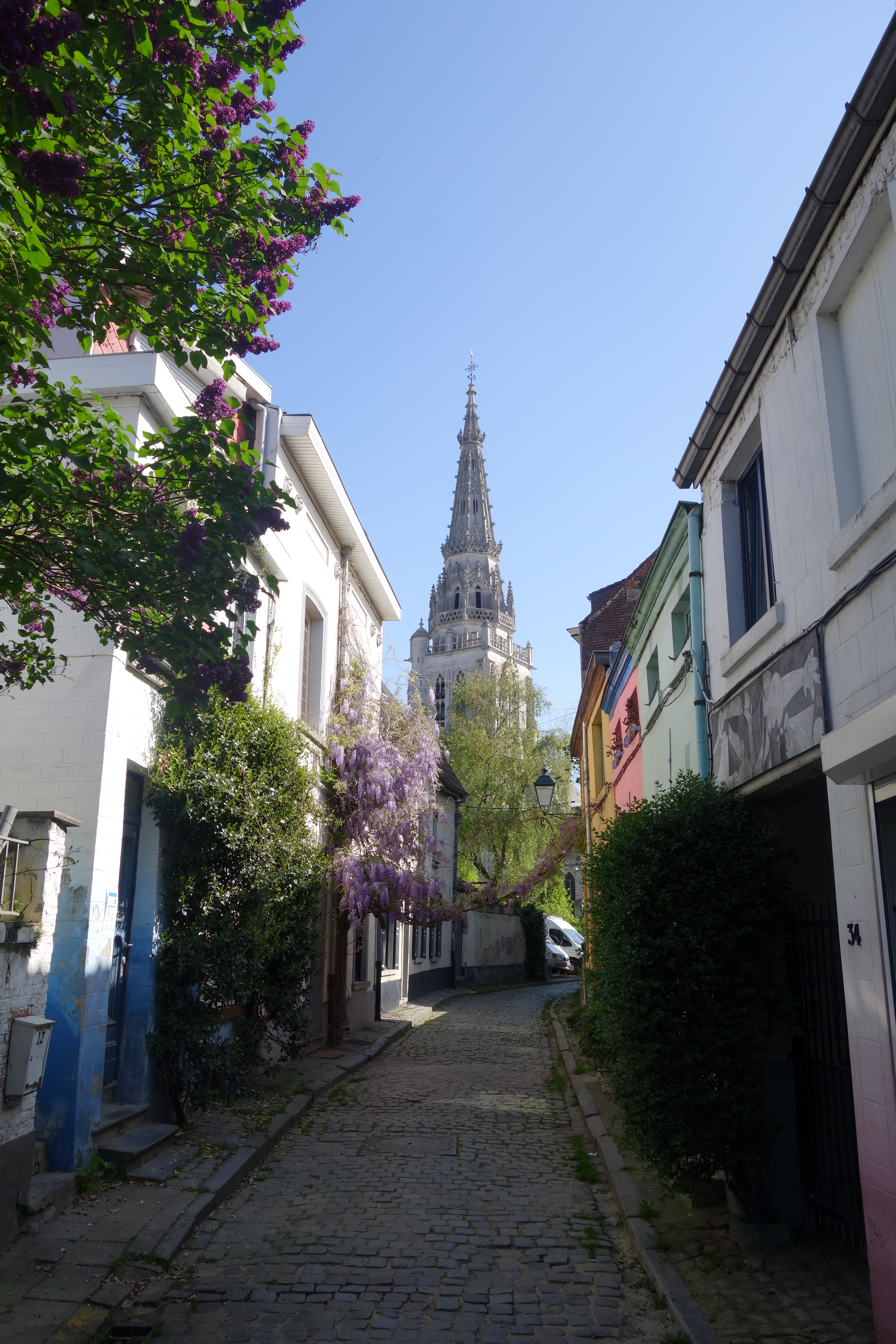
Rue Porselein / Porseleinstraat

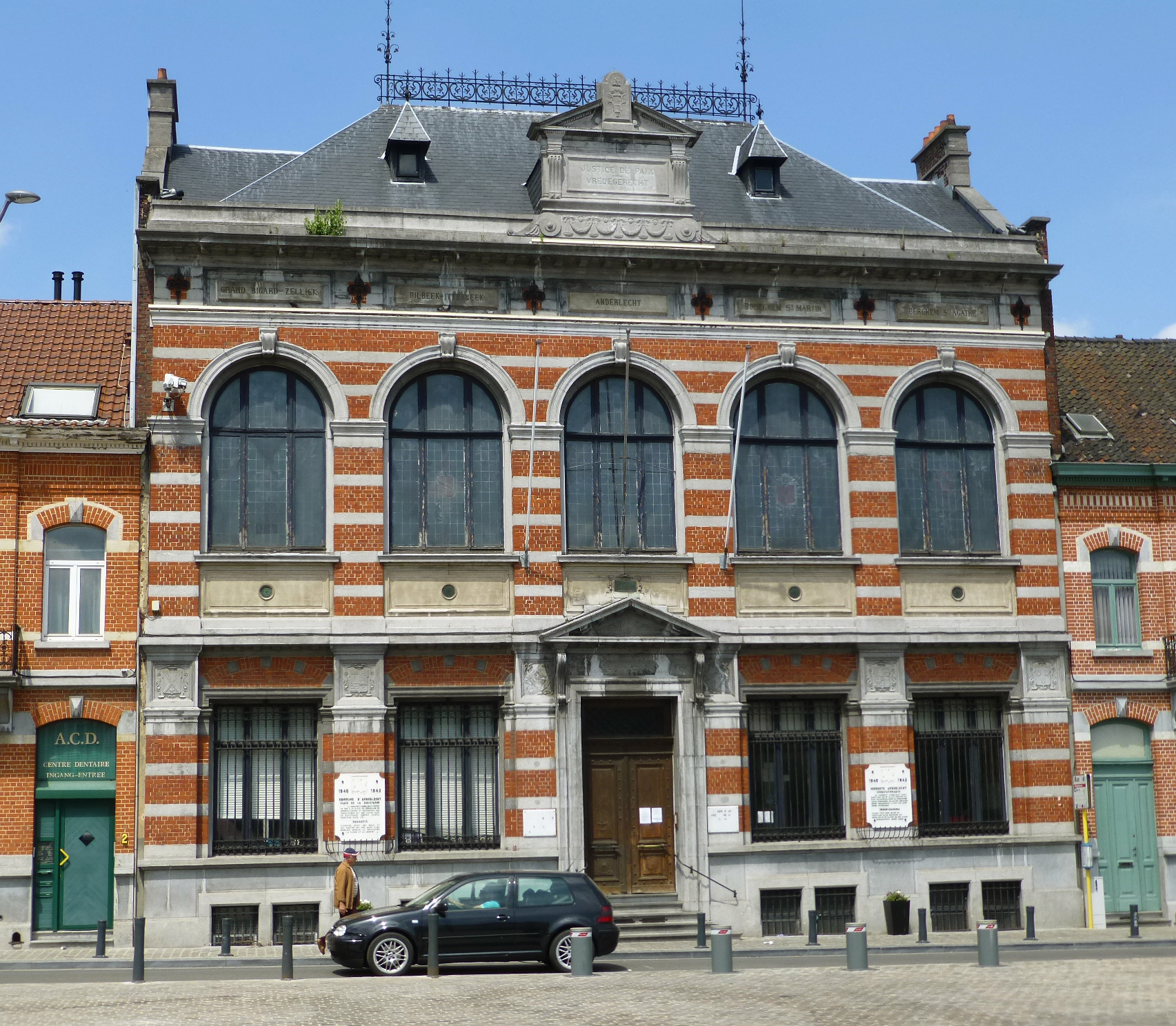
Justice de Paix of Anderlecht

== Demographics ==
=== Historical population ===
Historically, the population of Anderlecht was quite low. The municipality counted around 2,000 inhabitants at the beginning of the 19th century. However, following the Industrial Revolution, the population underwent a remarkable growth, peaking at 103,796 in 1970. From then, it began to decrease slightly to a low of 87,812 in 2000, before increasing again rapidly in recent years.

As of 1 January 2024, the population was 126,581. The area is 17.91 km^{2} (6.92 sq mi), making the density 7,066/km^{2} (18,300/sq mi).

- Sources: INS: 1806 to 1980 = census; 1990 and later = population on 1 January

=== Foreign population ===
Migrant communities in Anderlecht with over 1,000 people as of 1 January 2020:

Romania	7,405
Morocco	4,924
Italy	2,985
Spain	2,743
France	2,727
Portugal	2,628
Poland	2,549
Syria	1,717

Group of origin	Year	
Group of origin	2023	
Group of origin	Number	%
Belgians with Belgian background	22,685	18.14%
Belgians with foreign background	59,274	47.39%
Neighbouring country	2,231	
EU27 (excluding neighbouring country)	5,661	
Outside EU 27	51,382	41.08%
Non-Belgians	43,106	34.47%
Neighbouring country	3,371	
EU27 (excluding neighbouring country)	18,387	
Outside EU 27	21,348	17.07%
Total	125,065	100%

== Politics ==
The current city council was elected in the October 2018 elections. The current mayor of Anderlecht is Fabrice Cumps, a member of PS, who alongside the other parties on their list, sp.a and cdH, is in coalition on the municipal council with Ecolo - Groen, DéFI and Forward.

Anderlecht local election – 14 October 2018
Party
Party	Votes	%	Swing (pp)	Elected 2018	Change
PS - sp.a - cdH	14,023	29.73	▼7.04	16 / 47 (34%)	▼5
MR - Open Vld - IC	10,628	22.53	▼3.61	12 / 47 (26%)	▼2
Ecolo - Groen	7,320	15.52	▲4.17	8 / 47 (17%)	▲3
PVDA-PTB	6,891	14.61	▲12.92	7 / 47 (15%)	▲7
DéFI	3,581	7.59	▼0.26	3 / 47 (6%)	Steady
N-VA	1,950	4.13	▲0.94	1 / 47 (2%)	▼1
Vlaams Belang	1,006	2.13	▼1.53	0 / 47 (0%)	▼1
CD&V Plus	716	1.52	New	0 / 47 (0%)	-
Others	1,059	2.25	New	0 / 47 (0%)	-

== Events ==
The annual Anderlecht fair, originally a cattle fair, was authorised by William II of the Netherlands in 1825. Since then, it has taken the form of a series of celebrations, which still include animal shows but also a large market, a floral show, and the recreation of a religious procession in honour of Saint Guy.

== Economy ==
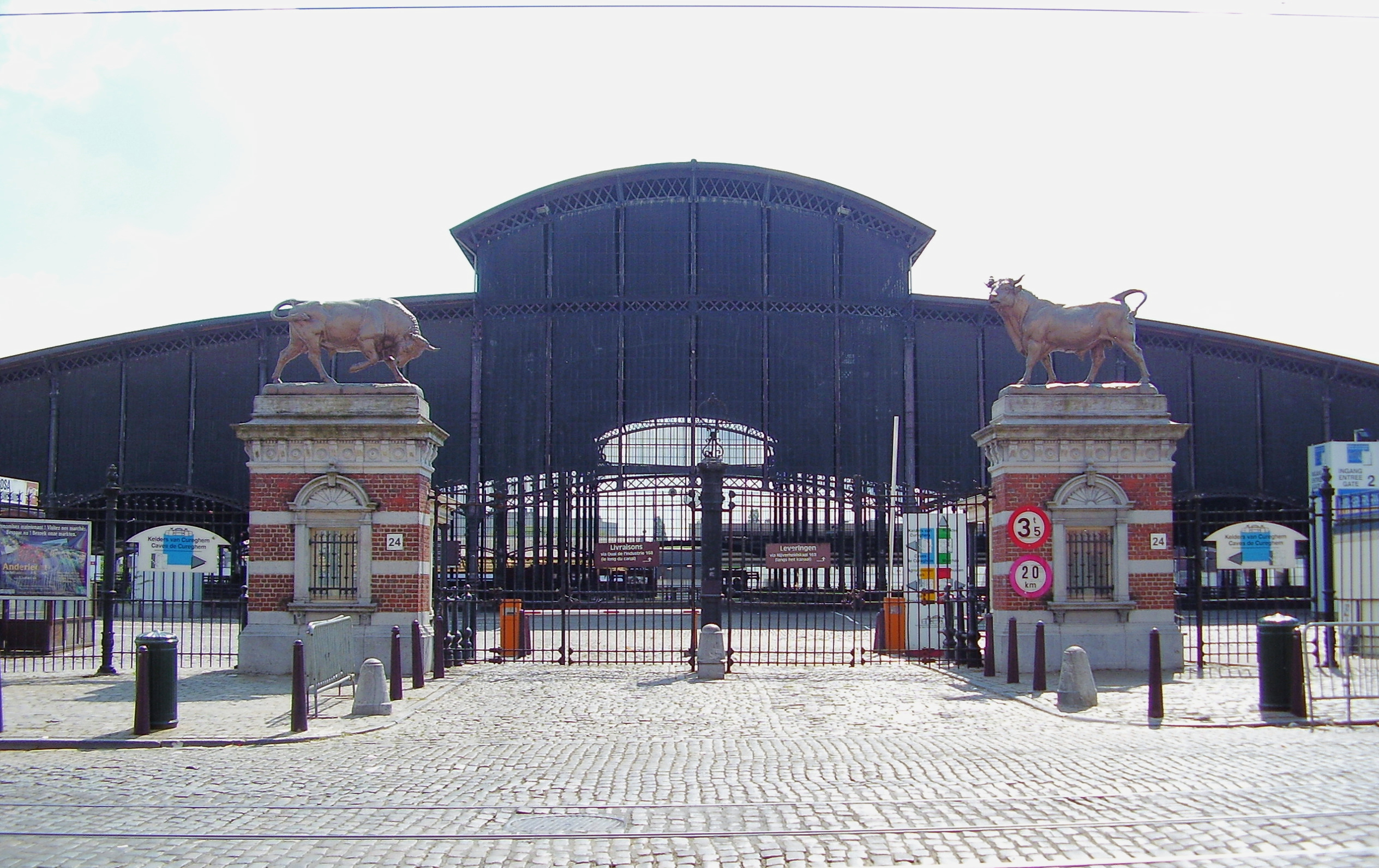
Entrance and Great Hall of the Abattoirs of Anderlecht (main slaughterhouse in Brussels)

The Abattoirs of Anderlecht, located at 24, rue Ropsy Chaudron/Ropsy Chaudronstraat in Cureghem, is the main slaughterhouse in Brussels, employing some 1,500 people. In addition to its main activities, the Great Hall serves as a covered market for food and flea markets.

In recent years, several major international companies have set up their headquarters in Anderlecht, notably the Delhaize Group, which operates many supermarket chains, from 40, square Marie Curie/Marie Curieplein, Coca-Cola Benelux at 1424, chaussée de Mons/Bergensesteenweg, as well as the Belgian chocolate company Leonidas at 41, boulevard Jules Graindor/Jules Graindorlaan.

== Healthcare ==
Several hospitals and clinics are located in Anderlecht:

- Erasmus Hospital
- Jules Bordet Institute
- Joseph Bracops Hospital
- St. Anne St. Remigius Clinic

== Sports ==
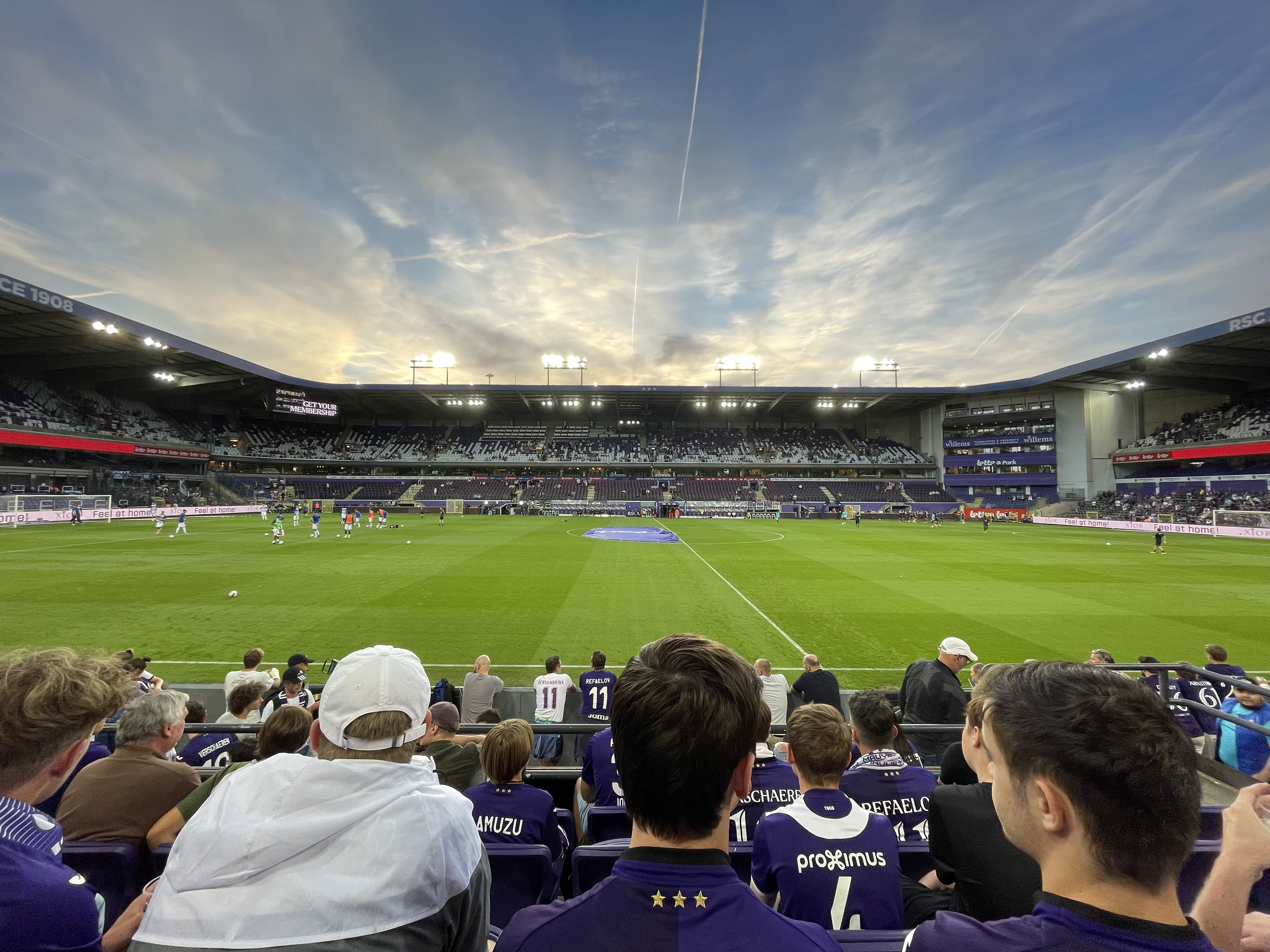
RSC Anderlecht fans at the Constant Vanden Stock Stadium

=== Football ===
Anderlecht is the home of the football club RSC Anderlecht, the most successful Belgian football team in European competition as well as in the Belgian First Division with 34 titles. The club's home stadium is the Constant Vanden Stock Stadium, located within Astrid Park. The team colours are white and purple.

== Parks and green spaces ==
Green spaces in the municipality include:

- Astrid Park
- Parc Forestier/Bospark, in Scheut
- Scherdemael Park
- Peterbos Park
- Joseph Lemaire Park
- Jean Vives Park
- Parc des Étangs/Vijverspark, in Neerpede
- Parc de la Rosée/Dauwpark, in Cureghem
- The Vogelzang or Vogelenzang, a natural protected area

== Notable inhabitants ==
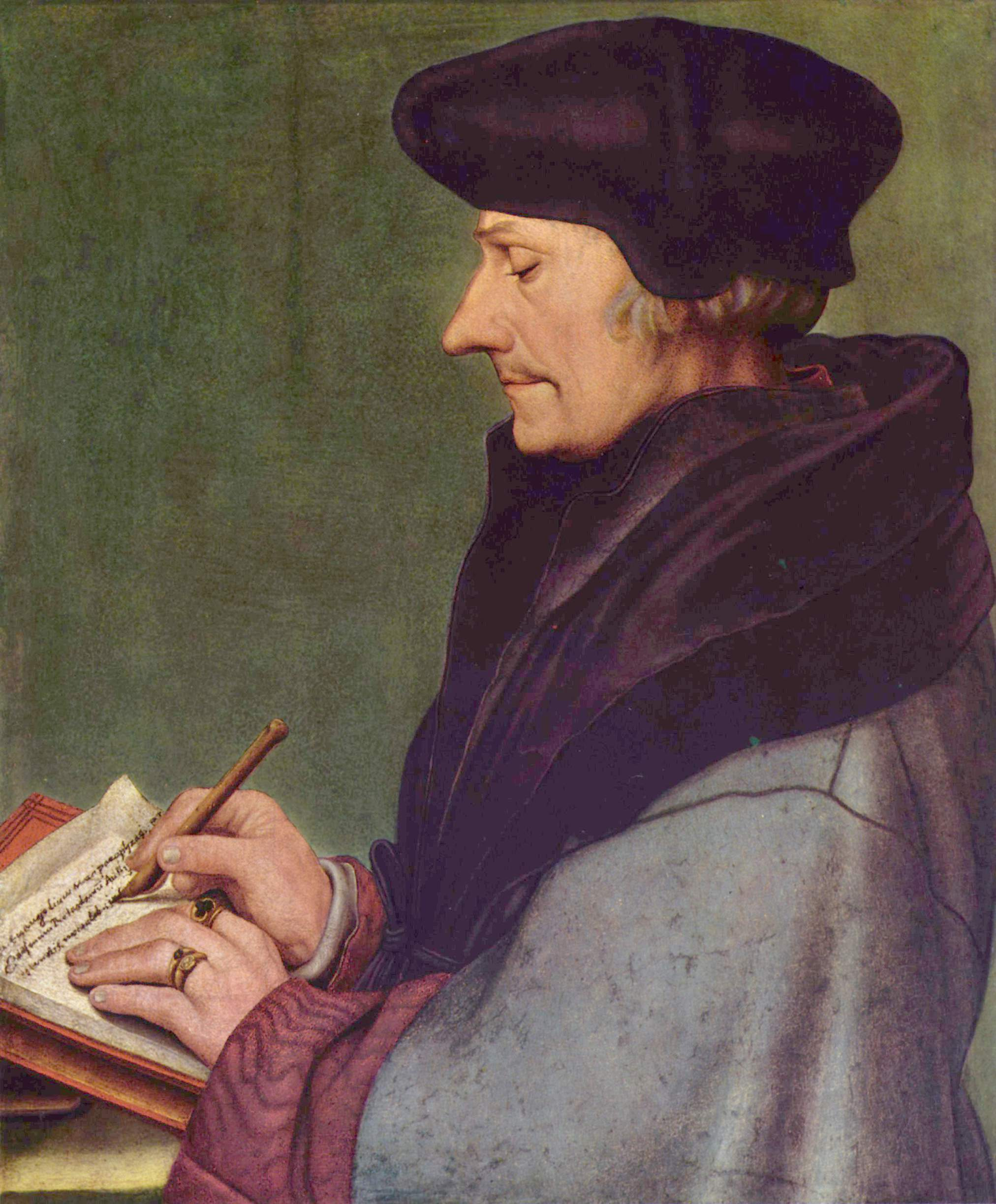
Erasmus painted by Hans Holbein the Younger (1523)

- Saint Guy (c. 950–1012), known as the Poor Man of Anderlecht, patron saint of Anderlecht
- Adrian VI (1459–1523), pope, theologian, rector at the University of Leuven, canon at the chapter of Anderlecht
- Joseph Bracops (1900–1966), politician and mayor of Anderlecht
- Jacques Brel (1929–1978), singer-songwriter and actor. He lived from 1942 to 1951 at 7, rue Jacques Manne/Jacques Mannestraat, and worked from 1946 to 1953 in the family cardboard box factory Vanneste & Brel (now SCA Packaging) at 18, rue Verheyden/Verheydenstraat. A nearby metro station is named after him.
- Maurice Carême (1899–1978), poet
- Fernand Dineur (1904–1956), cartoonist
- Benoît Drousie, also known as Zidrou (born 1962), comic book artist
- Desiderius Erasmus (1466–1536), humanist and theologian
- Jean Hayet (1939–2006), actor, stage manager and professor of the Théâtre royal des Galeries
- André Jacqmain (1921–2014), architect
- Désiré Keteleer (1920–1970), cyclist
- Filip Peeters (born 1962), Flemish actor
- Germaine Schneider (1903–1945), Belgian-Swiss member of the Resistance during World War II
- Henri Seroka (born 1949), singer and composer
- Henri Simonet (1931–1996), politician and mayor of Anderlecht
- Jacques Simonet (1963–2007), politician, mayor of Anderlecht, and Minister-President of the Brussels-Capital Region
- Marcel Spittael (1899–1981), architect
- Philippe Thys (1889–1971), cyclist and three-time champion of the Tour de France
- Tonia (Arlette Antoine Dominicus) (born 1947), singer, represented Belgium at the 11th Eurovision Song Contest in 1966
- Toots Thielemans (1922–2016), jazz musician
- William Vance (1935–2018), comic book artist
- Constant Vanden Stock (1914–2008), entrepreneur, footballer, functionary, and coach of the Belgium national team
- Virgile Vandeput (born 1994), Belgian-born alpine skier who competes for Israel
- Régine Zylberberg, better known as Régine (1929–2022), chanson singer, actress, clothing designer and nightclub entrepreneur

Born in Anderlecht:

- Abdelhamid Abaaoud (1987–2015), French jihadist terrorist involved in the November 2015 Paris attacks
- Princess Elisabeth (born 2001), Duchess of Brabant, the eldest child of King Philippe and Queen Mathilde; heiress
- Princes Gabriel and Emmanuel and Princess Eléonore; 2nd, 3rd and 4th in line to the throne of Belgium
- Yannick Mertens (born 1987), professional tennis player

== International relations ==
=== Twin towns and sister cities ===
Anderlecht is twinned with:

- Boulogne-Billancourt, France
- Berlin-Neukölln, Germany
- London Borough of Hammersmith and Fulham, United Kingdom
- Zaandam, Netherlands
- Marino, Italy

In addition, Anderlecht has signed a friendship agreement with:

- Sainte-Maxime, France
