= Theophile Verbist =

Belgian priest

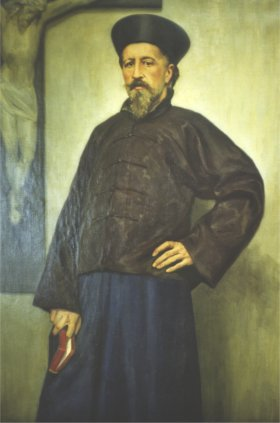
Portrait of Theophile Verbist

Theophile Verbist, CICM (Chinese: 南懷義 12 June 1823 – 23 February 1868) was a Belgian Catholic priest who founded the Congregation of the Immaculate Heart of Mary, a missionary religious congregation of men. He led missionary activities in China.

== Early life ==
Verbist was born in Antwerp, Belgium on 12 June 1823. After studies at the Minor Seminary and Major Seminary, Mechelen, he was ordained as a priest on 18 September 1847 by Cardinal Engelbert Sterckx, Archbishop of Mechelen. He was appointed subregent of the Minor Seminary of Mechelen on 1 October 1847.

== Career in Belgium ==
In 1853 he became chaplain of the Military Academy in Brussels. He was simultaneously appointed director of the Sisters of Molenbeek, a Congregation of Sisters of Notre Dame de Namur, which worked since 1840 in various countries as missionaries. He became the National Director in Belgium of the Association of the Holy Childhood, a charitable organization established in France to raise funds for orphans in countries with Catholic missions. Through this engagement he became aware of the plight of orphans in China.

In 1860 he conceived the plan to gather Belgian secular priests to travel to China and establish an orphanage. This initiative received the approval of Cardinal Sterckx. Cardinal Sterkx insisted that Verbist could only leave if he joined an existing congregation such as the Jesuits, the Recollects, the Paris Foreign Missions Society or the Lazarists who were already active in China or if his mission was incorporated into one of the apostolic vicariates in China. However, Verbist was able to convince the Belgian church leaders and finally obtain the approval of Cardinal Sterckx and the Belgian bishops to establish a new Belgian missionary congregation. The canonical establishment of the congregation by Cardinal Sterckx is dated 28 November 1862. This congregation, which had as its objective to send missionaries to China, was called the Congregation of the Immaculate Heart of Mary (CICM). It is better known under the name Scheutists, which refers to the place of its foundation, i.e. the "Scheutveld" in Anderlecht (now in Brussels). Theophiel Verbist was appointed by Cardinal Sterckx as the first Superior General.

== Mission to China ==
During a visit to Rome in 1862, he had proposed to the Propaganda Fide that Hong Kong be assigned as his congregation's mission area. This was declined as this area had already been assigned to the missionaries of Milan. On 1 September 1864 the area of Inner Mongolia in northern China was assigned to the Congregation of the Immaculate Heart of Mary as its mission area. This area had previously been assigned to the French Vincentians. As a result of the French protectorate of foreign catholic missionaries in China there existed a requirement that even Belgian missionaries should hold a French passport in order to engage in missionary activities in China. This delayed Verbist's departure for one year. On November 14, 1863, the Propaganda granted “the decree of praise” to the new Congregation and so it passed from diocesan right to pontifical right.

On 25 August 1865 Verbist set out on his journey in the company of four companions: Father Aloïs Van Segvelt, Frans Vrankx, Ferdinand Hamer and lay helper Paul Splingaerd. After landing in Hong Kong, they made their way to Xiwanzi in Inner Mongolia. Initially Xiwanzi was the center of their mission area. Two Chinese priests Petrus Feng and Vicent Fan who had been formed by the Lazarists assisted the newly arrived missionaries. On September 12, 1865, Verbist was appointed Prefect of the Apostolic Pro-vicar of Mongolia. In November 1866 three new CICM fathers arrived to support the missionary work, which was being expanded eastward.

On 23 February 1868 Verbist died from typhus in the village of Laohugou (Chinese: 老虎沟) during a visit to the eastern mission area. On 10 May 1931 his mortal remains were solemnly repatriated in a Chinese coffin to Anderlecht and placed in a mausoleum established in a side chapel of the CICM church in Scheut. The mausoleum includes a bronze statue of Verbist, dressed in Chinese garments, and kneeling with open arms before the globe, made by the sculptor Aloïs De Beule. When the CICM church in Scheut was razed in 1974, Verbist's Chinese coffin was moved to a small crypt under the new chapel and the bronze statue was placed in the garden.

== See also ==
- The Congregation of the Immaculate Heart of Mary
- Theophiel Verbist in ODIS – Online Database for Intermediary Structures
