= University of Saint Louis Tuguegarao =

Catholic university in Cagayan, Philippines

- Former name: Cagayan Valley Atheneum (1938-1946)
- Motto: Latin: Sapientia Aedificat
- Motto in English: Wisdom Builds
- Type: Private, Non-profit, Higher education institution
- Established: 1965; 61 years ago
- Religious affiliation: Catholic (CICM Missionaries)
- Chairman: Ramon Caluza
- President: Macwayne Maniwang
- Vice-president: Emmanuel James Pattaguan (VP for Academic Affairs); Rina M. Reyes (VP for Administration); Celso L. Tuddao (VP for Finance)
- Principal: Emily T. Mabborang (Elementary, JHS, and SHS-Basic Education System)
- Chaplain: John Mark Barroga
- Location: Mabini Street, Ugac Sur, Tuguegarao, Cagayan, Philippines; 17°36′36.4932″N 121°43′25.18392″E
- Campus: Urban
- Alma Mater song: "Saint Louis Hymn"
- Colors: Blue and Gold
- Nickname: Louisian
- Website: www.usl.edu.ph
- Location in Luzon Location in the Philippines

The University of Saint Louis Tuguegarao is a private Catholic higher education institution run by the Congregation of the Immaculate Heart of Mary in Tuguegarao, Cagayan, Philippines. It was founded in 1965 by the CICM Missionaries. It traces its roots from a diocesan secondary school named Cagayan Valley Atheneum established in 1938 by Constant Jurgens, a Dutch by nationality, then Bishop of the Diocese of Tuguegarao and a CICM missionary and great educator. The CICM Fathers took over administration of the school in 1965 and renamed.

== Departments ==
The University comprises 5 departments of study, each accommodating specific courses or study fields related to one another. These are the:

- School of Architecture, Computing and Engineering (SACE), accommodating students who take up courses related to engineering, computer science or architecture.
- School of Education, Criminology, Arts, and Psychology (SECAP), for students who take up political science, teacher education, criminology, or psychology.
- School of Accountancy, Business, and Hospitality (SABH), for students who want to take hotel management, tourism, accountancy, or other business-related courses.
- School of Health and Allied Sciences (SHAS), for students who want to take up healthcare-related courses like medical laboratory science and nursing.
- Basic Education School (BES), comprising the elementary, junior high school and senior high school department.

== Affiliate schools ==
Other CICM run schools include:

- Saint Louis College, San Fernando, La Union
- Saint Louis University, Baguio
- Saint Mary's University, Bayombong, Nueva Vizcaya
- Saint Louis School College–Cebu, Mandaue, Cebu
- Maryhurst Seminary, Baguio
- Maryhill School of Theology, Quezon City
- University of Saint Louis Constant Jurgens Campus, Brgy. Leonarda, Tuguegarao

== See also ==
- Ateneo de Tuguegarao
