= CICM Missionaries =

Roman Catholic missionary religious congregation of men

Congregation of the Immaculate Heart of Mary
- Congregatio Immaculati Cordis Mariae (Latin)
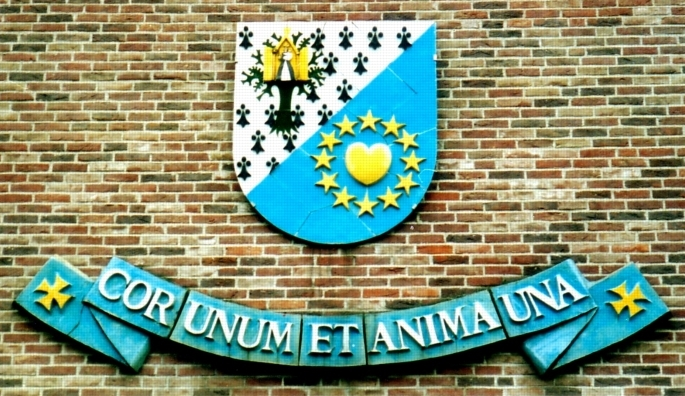
- Abbreviation: C.I.C.M
- Nickname: Missionhurst
- Formation: 1862; 164 years ago
- Founder: Fr. Théophile Verbist, CICM
- Founded at: Scheut, Anderlecht, Brussels-Capital Region, Belgium
- Type: Clerical Religious Congregation of Pontifical Right for men
- Headquarters: General Motherhouse; Via S. Giovanni Eudes 95, 00163 Rome, Italy
- Members: 780 members (585 priests) as of 2021
- Motto: Latin: Cor Unum et Anima Una; English: One Heart and one Soul
- Superior General: Fr. Charles Phukuta Khonde, CICM
- Ministry: Home and foreign mission work
- Affiliations: Roman Catholic Church
- Website: cicm-mission.org

The CICM Missionaries, officially known as the Congregation of the Immaculate Heart of Mary (Latin: Congregatio Immaculati Cordis Mariae) and often abbreviated as C.I.C.M, is a Catholic clerical religious congregation of Pontifical Right for men established in 1862 by the Belgian Catholic priest Theophile Verbist (1823–1868). Its members add the post-nominal letters C.I.C.M. to their names to indicate membership in the congregation.

The order's origins lie in Scheut, a suburb of Brussels, due to which it is widely known as the Scheut Missionaries. The congregation is most notable for their international missionary works in China, Mongolia, the Philippines, and in the Congo Free State/Belgian Congo (modern-day Democratic Republic of the Congo).

Presently, their international name "CICM Missionaries" is preferred, although, in the United States, the congregation is mostly known as "Missionhurst".

== History ==
=== Foundation ===
The congregation was founded by Théophile Verbist, who was a diocesan priest in the Archdiocese of Mechelen-Brussels in the mid-19th century. He served as chaplain to the military academy in Brussels and at the same time as a national director of the Pontifical Association of the Holy Childhood. He would lead a group of other Belgian diocesan priests, who became deeply concerned with the abandoned children in China and with the millions in China which, at the time, suffered from widespread poverty. The congregation is named after a religious Marian devotion to the Immaculate Heart of Mary and has sought to expand its missionary work in various countries abroad.

=== Early activities ===
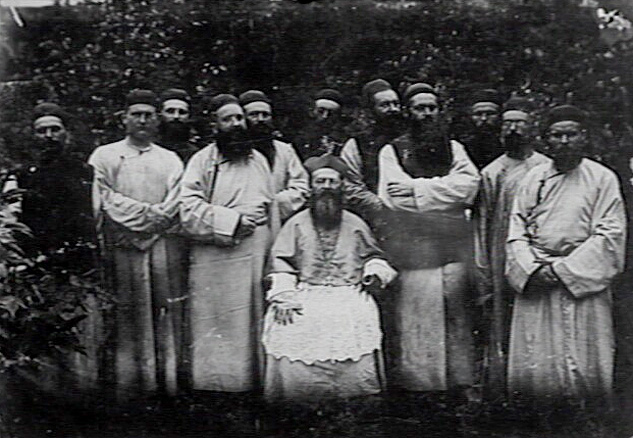
The Dutch Apostolic Vicar Theodoor Rutjes among other Scheutists in Inner Mongolia, c. 1885

With the Convention of Peking occurring, the CICM would begin establishing operations in the country in the early 1860s. In 1862, Verbist founded the Belgian Mission in China. Upon seeking ecclesiastical permission, however, they were commissioned by Cardinal Alessandro Barnabò to begin their work by founding a seminary in Belgium to supply priests for the beginning mission, laying the foundations of the Scheutveld College, 28 April 1863, in the Field of Scheut near Brussels. As a result, the C.I.C.M. missionaries were also known as Scheutists or Scheut missionaries.

In September 1863, the first group of missionaries set forth for Inner Mongolia. In the winter of 1865, Verbist and his four companions arrived in inner Mongolia, which was entrusted to the fledgling congregation by Rome, and immediately began organizing small Christian communities. Three years later, on 23 February 1868, Verbist died of typhoid fever at the age of 44 in Lao-Hu-Kou.

The Scheutveld priests and brothers would face dangers such as the Boxer Rebellion in China, the climate of the nations in which missions were conducted, and persecution of the missionaries and their local congregations.

After World War I, Belgium lay devastated, leading the Missionary Fathers of Scheut to establish a center in a safe location from which they could send out their missionaries. As many Belgian refugees at that time were living in London, it was thought that a church in that city would serve the spiritual needs of the Belgian community of London and also become a base for the Order's missionary activities. In 1922, the Church of Our Lady of Hal was established in a hut on Arlington Road in Camden Town while a permanent church was built opposite this site in 1933.

=== World War II ===
During World War II, Father Jozef Raskin, who was a missionary to Inner Mongolia from 1920 to 1934, was made a chaplain in the Belgian army and was a personal advisor to King Leopold III. While he was operating under the code name Leopold Vindictive 200 for the Dutch resistance in 1942, he was captured by the Gestapo and sentenced to death by beheading on 18 October 1943.

=== Later years ===
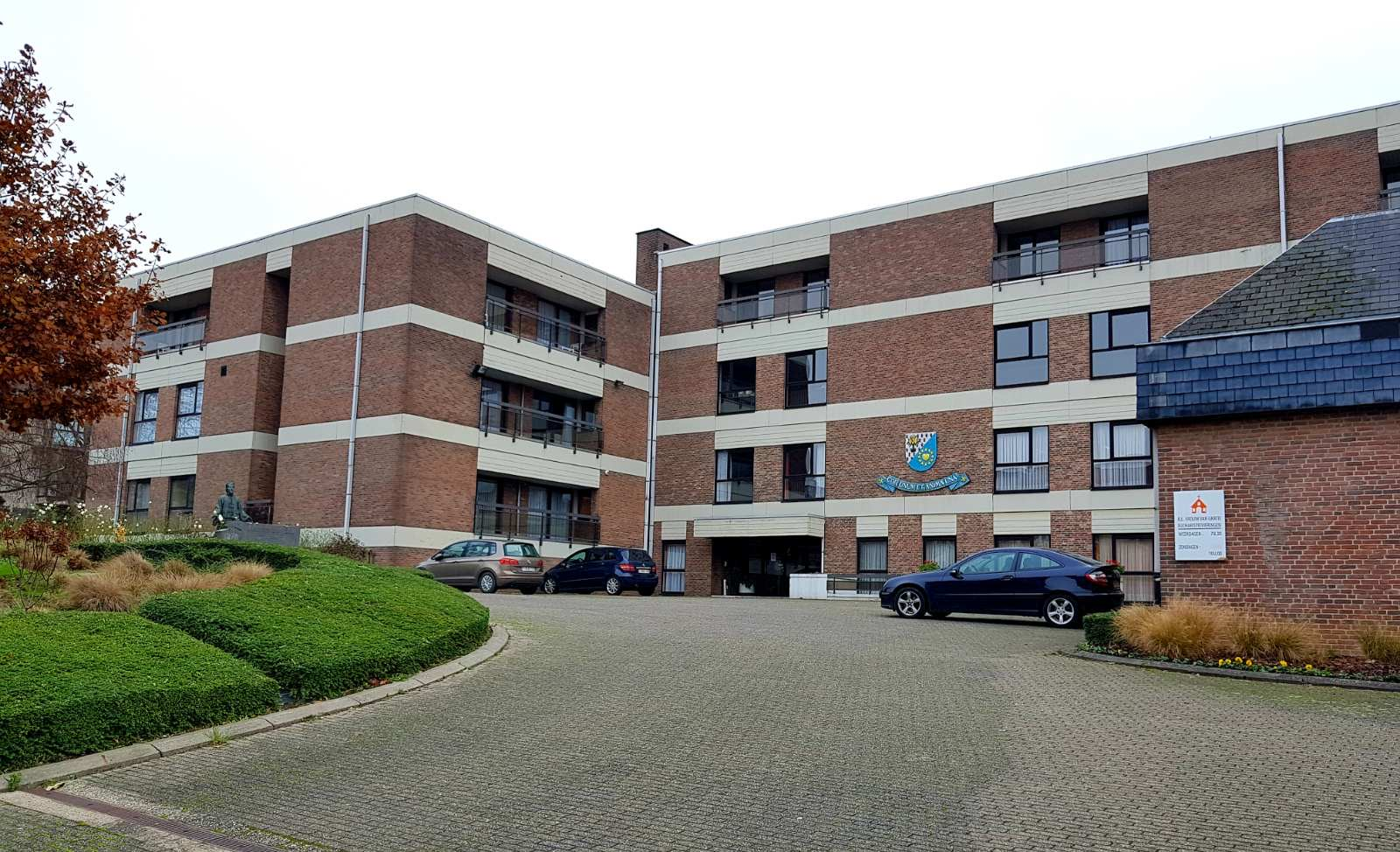
Scheut House in Anderlecht, Brussels

The congregation would grow in the following years, eventually growing to have a worldwide presence. Originally a Belgian Foundation, CICM has grown into an international religious missionary congregation of men from different races, colors and nationalities.

In connection with their missions, the Fathers opened a number of institutions, such the hospital at St-Trudon, Upper Kassai, for those afflicted with sleeping sickness.

Today, 780 CICM priests and lay brothers are present in Asian countries (e.g. Mongolia, Indonesia, and Japan), Africa, the Americas, and in Europe.

== Historical table ==
Chapter	year	Superior General	country	members
	1862	VERBIST Théophile	Belgium	
	1865		China	
	1869	VRANCKX Frans		11
Gen. Conf.	1887			
	1888	VAN AERTSELAER Jeroom	Congo	112
I	1898	VAN HECKE Adolf		309
	1899		Netherlands	
	1904		Rome	
	1907		Philippines	
II	1908	BOTTY Albert		507
	1909	MORTIER Florent		
III	1920	RUTTEN Joseph		649
IV	1930	DAEMS Constant		928
	1931		Singapore	
	1935	VANDEPUTTE Jozef (Vic.g.)		1202
	1937		Indonesia	
	1946		U.S.A.	
V	1947	VANDEPUTTE Jozef	Japan	1479
	1953		Haïti - Chile (+1957)	
	1954		Hong Kong - Taiwan	
	1954		Guatemala	
VI	1957	SERCU Frans		1902
	1958		Dominican Republic	
	1961	DEGRIJSE Omer		1943
	1963		Brazil	
	1966		Cameroon	
VII	1967	GOOSSENS Wim		1986
VIII	1974	VAN DAELEN Paul		1683
	1976		Zambia - Senegal	
	1977		Nigeria (+2003)	
	1979		Mexico	
IX	1981	VAN DAELEN Paul (2a)		1556
X	1987	DECRAENE Michel		1441
	1989		France (+2019)	
	1990		Tchad (+2008)	
	1992		Mongolia	
XI	1993	THOMAS Jacques		1380
	1995		Angola (+2007)	1359
XII	1999	LAPAUW Jozef	Mozambique (+2002)	1247
XIII	2005	TSIMBA Edouard		999
	2006		South Africa (+2016)	990
XIV	2011	ATKIN Timothy		881
	2016		Central African Republic	
XV	2017	PHUKUTA K. Charles		797
	2020		Malawi	780

== Current CICM Schools ==
=== Philippines ===
St Theresa's College, Baguio City (exclusive girls' school, closed and now opened as part of St Louis University)

- Saint Louis University, Baguio
- Saint Louis College, San Fernando, La Union
- University of Saint Louis Tuguegarao, Tuguegarao, Cagayan Valley
- Saint Mary's University, Bayombong, Nueva Vizcaya
- Saint Louis College – Cebu, Mandaue, Cebu
- Maryhurst Seminary, Baguio
- Maryhill School of Theology, Quezon City
- Maryshore Seminary, Bacolod
- Saint Vincent's School, Bontoc, Mountain Province
- Santo Rosario School, Pudtol, Apayao

== Gallery ==
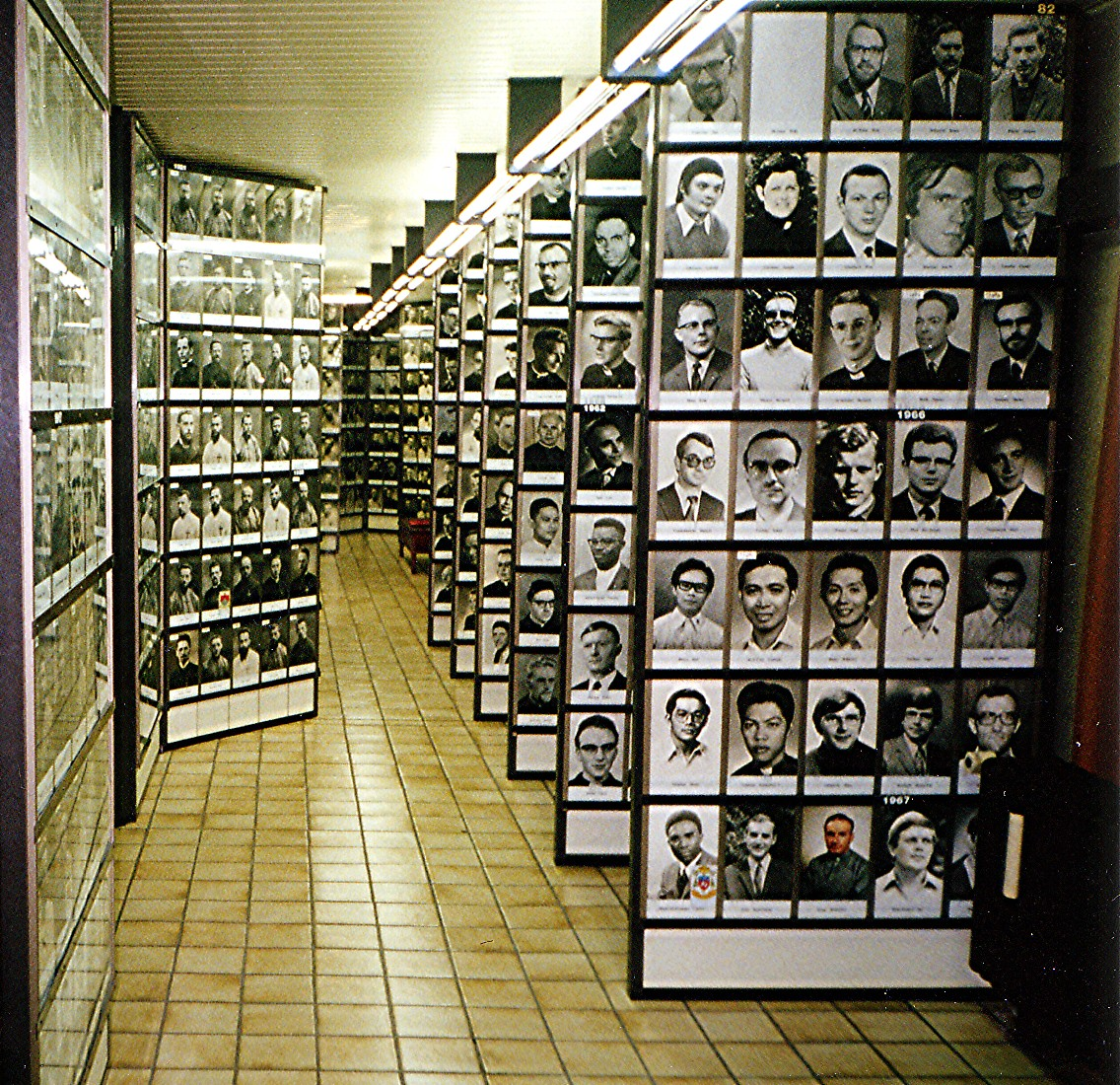
A gallery of all CICM missionaries at the Scheut House in Anderlecht, Brussels

A Relief of Fr. Jules Sepulchre, CICM, in Bontoc, Mountain Province, Philippines. He is one of the founding Missionaries in the Northern Philippines.

The plate under the relief of Fr. Jules Sepulchre, CICM in Bontoc, Mountain Province, Philippines

== Bibliography ==
- Raskin, Albert (1977) 'The archives of the Congregation of the Immaculate Heart of Mary (C.I.C.M.)', History in Africa, 4, 299–304.
- Berg, Leo van den (1994) 'The China world of the "Scheut fathers"', Bulletin de l 'Institut Historique de Belge de Rome, 64, 223–263.
- Verhelst, Daniël; Pycke, Nestor (1995). C.I.C.M. Missionaries Past and Present: History of the Congregation of the Immaculate Heart of Mary (Scheut/Missionhurst). Verbistiana. Vol. 4. Leuven: Leuven University Press. ISBN 978-9-06186-676-3.
- Vanysacker, Dries; Renson, Raymond (1995). The Archives of the Congregation of the Immaculate Heart of Mary (CICM-Scheut) (1862–1967) - 2 v. Rome: Bibliothèque de l'Institut Historique Belge de Rome. ISBN 978-9-07446-115-3.
