= Schaerbeek Beer Museum =

Beer museum in Brussels, Belgium

- Musée schaerbeekois de la bière (French); Schaarbeeks Biermuseum (Dutch)
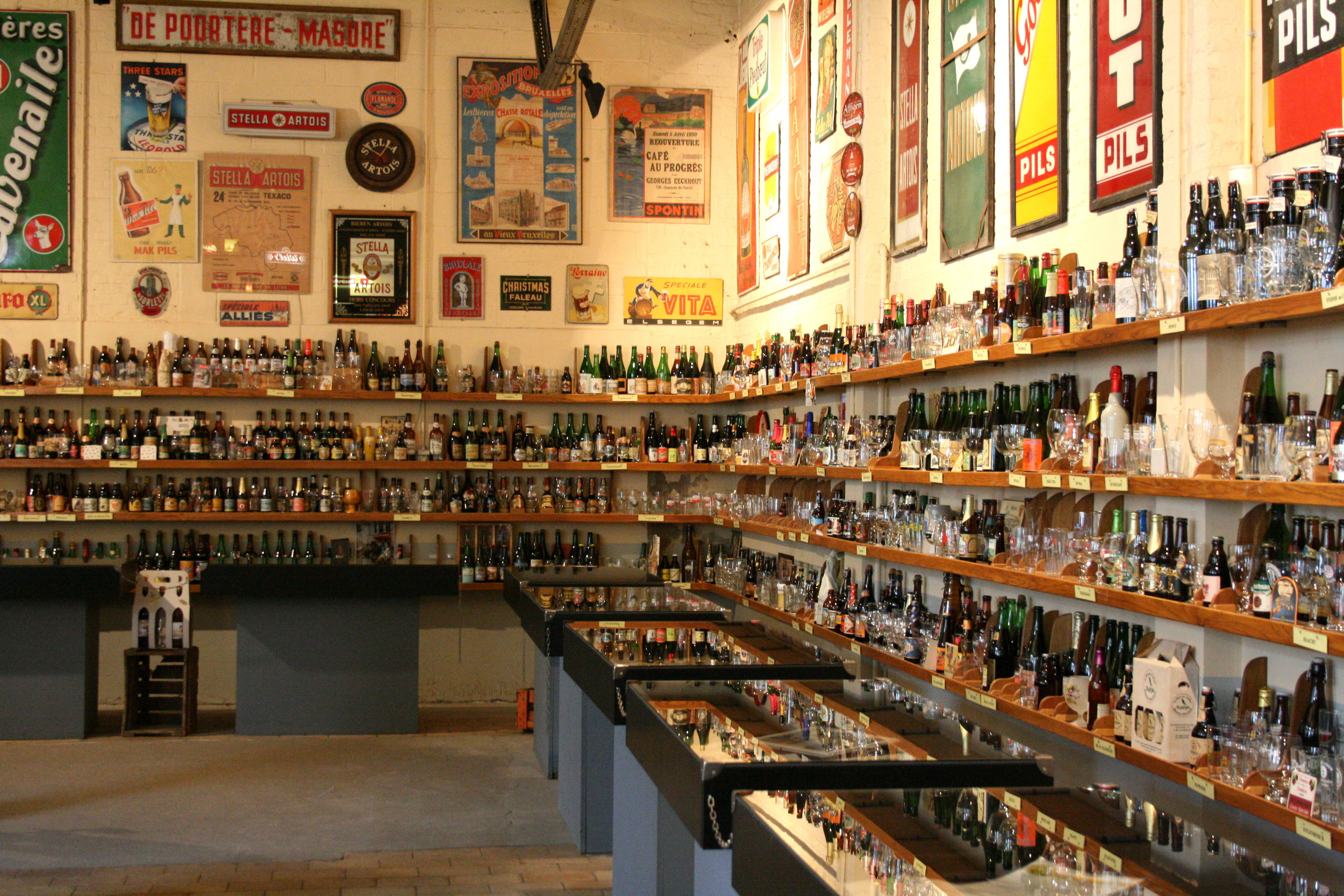
- Interior of the museum
- Interactive fullscreen map
- Location: Avenue Louis Bertrand / Louis Bertrandlaan 33–35, 1030 Schaerbeek, Brussels-Capital Region, Belgium
- Coordinates: 50°51′48″N 4°22′30″E
- Type: Beer museum
- Website: museedelabiereschaerbeekois.be

The Schaerbeek Beer Museum (French: Musée schaerbeekois de la bière; Dutch: Schaarbeeks Biermuseum) is a museum in Schaerbeek, a municipality of Brussels, Belgium, dedicated to Belgian beers. The museum, which is a non-profit association, was founded in 1993 and officially opened in March 1994.

The museum houses a collection of more than 1,000 bottles of Belgian beer and their respective beer glasses. Also exhibited are beer making machines, tools, advertisements and the archives of breweries past and present. The museum also features a reconstructed tavern from the early 1900s.

A beer named the Schaerbeekoise is produced for the museum by the Brasserie des Rocs. This beer, as well as many other varieties of Belgian beer, is served in the museum's own tavern, which is in the former workshops of a nearby school.

== See also ==
- Cantillon (brewery)
- Belle-Vue Brewery
- Brasserie de la Senne
- List of museums in Brussels
- Culture of Belgium
