= Damià Díaz =

Spanish artist

Damià Díaz (Alicante, 7 July 1966) is a Spanish artist.

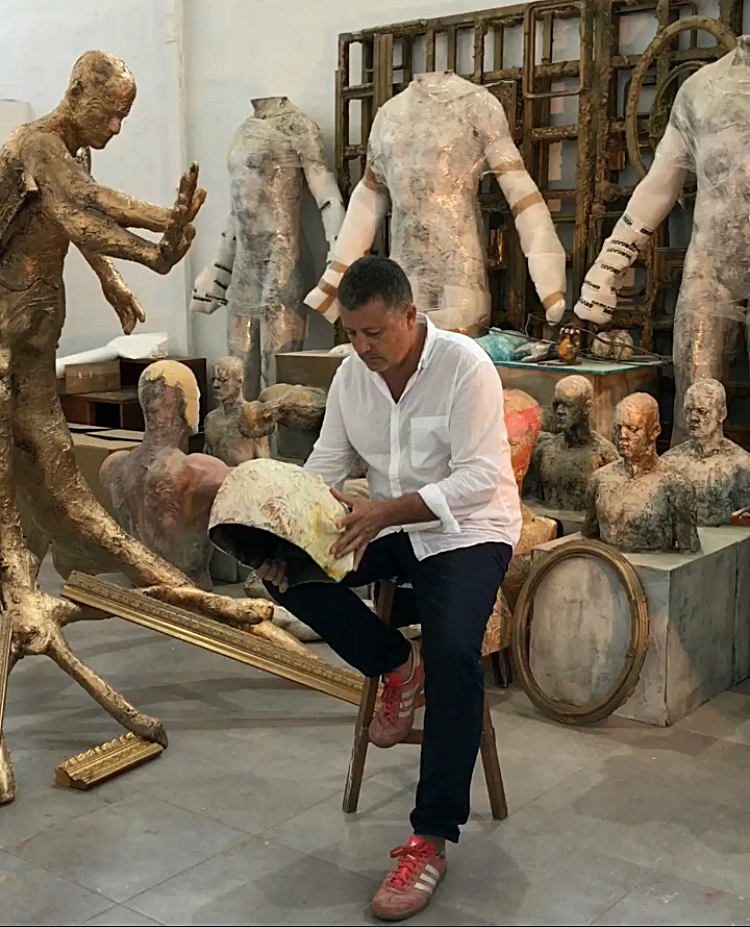
Damià Díaz in his studio. 2016

== Biography ==
After graduated with a BA in Fine Arts from Technical University of Valencia, Valencia, and l’Ecole Nationale Supérieure des Arts Visuels de La Cambre, Brussels, Damià began his art career in 1986. He had his first international exhibition, Temps i Pensament, at Saint Louis de l'Hôpital Salpêtrière, Paris. in 2002. Featuring painting and sculpture, the show would later travel to the University of Alicante Museum (MUA).

He continued experimenting with new materials and technologies, combining them with the legacy of Classical and Baroque art. In 2004 he exhibited Recinte D'Idees at the Sapiencia chapel, University of Valencia.

In 2005, his show La Cabeza Parlante/Imagen del Caballero was held at the cloister of La Nau, the former headquarters of the University of Valencia, to commemorate the 4th centennial of the first edition of Don Quixote. The exhibition travelled later to the Instituto Cervantes in New York City.

In 2010 Damià took part in the A-Factorij project in Amsterdam where one of his painted iron and mixed media sculptures now remains on permanent exhibition in the public access to the complex. The rest of the works he presented in that project now belong to the Contempera Collection, Amsterdam. Both the A-Factorij project and the works included in it are featured in the book The Skin of Silence, The Work of Damià Díaz in the Contempera Collection, published in 2019 by the collector.

In 2012 he presented The space between words at the Erasmus House Museum in Brussels. In 2013, the exhibition went on display to La Parking Gallery, in Alicante.

In 2016, following a period spent in Madrid, Díaz began working with virtual and mixed reality, incorporating these techniques into his art practice. That same year he created an exhibition/art action with virtual reality in the no longer existing venue Urg3l. The nature of the technique used, in which the borders between work, exhibition and documentation are fuzzy, means that it is still possible to access Storm of Silence immersively despite the disappearance of the physical space for which it was conceived.

In 2017, the Martínez-LLoret Collection includes three of his works in the exhibition Alta Fidelidad at the Miguel Hernández University of Elche.

In 2019, Díaz was chosen as a participating artist in the Mostra Espanha Biennial in Portugal, and was the first contemporary Spanish artist to exhibit at the Palace of Ajuda, Lisbon, with The Path of the Gaze and the second to engage in a dialogue with the palace's historical and artistic legacy, following the exhibition by Joana Vasconcelos in 2013. In the words of Lucía Ybarra, from YGBART, co-curator of the show together with Rosina Gómez Baeza, “A group of works fills the halls of the nineteenth-century neoclassical palace, the former residence of the Portuguese royal family now converted into a historic museum, establishing a dialogue between two worlds: a gaze on the past from the perspective of an artist who constantly observes the relationship between the human being and his world. In Damià’s work the human figure is an observer of his surroundings. A selection of sculptures in painted resin, digital prints on ceramics and works in augmented reality enable the artist to intervene in singular spaces and transform rooms where the beholder can interact with the work. Thanks to the use of new technologies, the artist discovers and offers audiences new immersive possibilities. When coupled with a series of smaller format sculptures, drawings and sketches, the body of work as a whole evinces the creative processes and evolution of Damià’s practice. His work reflects an interest in the human being, in investigating and exploring the world in which he lives, a constant search to learn and to obtain new knowledge and new values that will help to defend himself against the present isolation of society today.”
