= List of museums in Brussels =

This is a list of museums in Brussels, Belgium. It includes museums situated in any of the municipalities of the Brussels-Capital Region.

== Museums ==
Name	Image	Municipality	Type	Focus	Summary
Albert Couvreur Pharmaceutical Museum		Woluwe-Saint-Lambert	Science	Pharmaceuticals	
Antoine Wiertz Museum		Ixelles	Art	Antoine Wiertz	1850s house where artist Antoine Wiertz lived
Archiefstuk		City of Brussels	Local	Flemish Brusselers	Collection of items related to Flemish culture in Brussels
Archives of the City of Brussels		City of Brussels	History	City of Brussels	Located in the former refuge of Gembloux Abbey
Archives and French Literature Museum		City of Brussels	Literary	French literature	Located in the Royal Library of Belgium
Art & History Museum (part of Royal Museums of Art and History)		City of Brussels	History – Art		Historical and artistic artefacts from cultures around the world
Art et marges museum		City of Brussels	Art	Outsider art	Located in the CHU Saint-Pierre
Autoworld		City of Brussels	Transport	Cars	Located in the Cinquantenaire
Autrique House		Schaerbeek	Architecture		1890s town house designed by the architect Victor Horta in the Art Nouveau style
Beguinage of Anderlecht		Anderlecht	Local		Former beguinage
Belgian Museum of Freemasonry		City of Brussels	Cultural	Freemasonry	1760s house where architect Laurent-Benoît Dewez lived
Brussels Museum of Industry and Labour – La Fonderie		Molenbeek-Saint-Jean	History	Industry	Displays machinery from important local industries and exhibits relating to the area's economic and social history. Located in an old foundry.
Brussels Museum of the Mill and Food		Evere	Food		Located in an old windmill
Brussels Urban Transport Museum		Woluwe-Saint-Pierre	Transport	Public transport	1890s tram depot
Bruxella 1238		City of Brussels	Archaeology		Ruins of a Franciscan convent under the Bourse Palace
Belgian Brewers Museum		City of Brussels	Industry	Brewing	
Choco-Story Brussels		City of Brussels	Food	Chocolate	
Belgian Comic Strip Center		City of Brussels	Art	Comic strips	Belgian comic strips and their history
BELvue Museum		City of Brussels	History	Belgian history	Located in the 18th-century neoclassical Hôtel Belle-Vue
Museum of the Black Sisters		Koekelberg	Cultural	Black Sisters	Museum dedicated to the "Black Sisters", a Cellite religious congregation, located in the Basilica of Koekelberg
Camille Lemonnier Museum		Ixelles	Art	Camille Lemonnier	Working office of the writer Camille Lemonnier, paintings and sculptures
Cantillon Brewery (Gueuze Museum)		Anderlecht	Industry	Brewing	Small brewery making beers in the traditional gueuze, lambic and kriek styles, which also functions as a museum of Gueuze beer
Cauchie House		Etterbeek	Architecture		Art Nouveau house designed by the architect Paul Cauchie
Centre for Fine Arts		City of Brussels	Art		Also known as Bozar, hosts exhibitions of fine art, as well as concerts, theatre, dance and other cultural events
Charlier Museum		Saint-Josse-ten-Noode	Art	Belgian art	
Children's Museum		Ixelles	Children		
Museum of China – Scheut		Anderlecht	Cultural	CICM Missionaries	
Cinematek		City of Brussels	Cultural	Cinema	Museum of Cinema, with daily showings of films from the archive
Brussels City Museum		City of Brussels	History	City of Brussels	History of Brussels, with an emphasis on its development over time and its art
Clockarium		Schaerbeek	Art	Art Deco clocks	
Confederate Museum		Woluwe-Saint-Lambert	History	American Civil War	
Collections of the Public Social Welfare Centre		City of Brussels	Art	Public Centre for Social Welfare	
Constantin Meunier Museum		Ixelles	Art	Constantin Meunier	Works by the painter and sculptor Constantin Meunier
Museum of Costume & Lace		City of Brussels	Fashion		Collection and exhibitions on the history of fashion and lace-making (a traditional industry of Brussels)
Coudenberg – Former Palace of Brussels		City of Brussels	Archaeology		Ruins of the Palace of Coudenberg and nearby buildings from the same era
County of Jette Municipal Museum		Jette	Local	Jette	Local history of Jette county
Design Museum Brussels		City of Brussels	Art	Design	Located in the Trademart Brussels
D'leteren Gallery		Ixelles	Transport	D'Ieteren	History of the D'Ieteren company and collection of its vehicles
Erasmus House		Anderlecht	Historic house	Erasmus	The Dutch humanist writer Erasmus of Rotterdam once stayed in this house
Espace Photographique Contretype		Saint-Gilles	Art	Photography	Contemporary photography museum
Evere Municipal Museum		Evere	Local	Evere	Local history of Evere county
Experimentarium (part of the ULB)		Ixelles	Science	Physics	
Museum of Fantastic Art		Ixelles	Art	Fantastic art	Fantastical, bizarre and weird creations, sculptures and pictures
Museums of the Far East (Japanese Tower and Chinese Pavilion) (part of Royal Museums of Art and History)		City of Brussels (Laeken)	Art		
Fin-de-Siècle Museum		City of Brussels	Art		
Royal Museums of Fine Arts of Belgium		City of Brussels	Art	Fine art	Major art gallery featuring fine art from the 15th to the 20th century by Belgian and international artists
Géo De Vlamynck Atelier		Schaerbeek	Art	Géo De Vlamynck	Studio of the artist, architect and designer Géo De Vlamynck
Grand Serment Royal et de St-Georges des Arbalétriers		City of Brussels	History		Museum of a royal guild of crossbow archers, displaying crossbows and the history of the guild
Halle Gate (part of Royal Museums of Art and History)		Saint-Gilles	History		History of Brussels and armaments. Located in one of the city gates of the second walls of Brussels
Horta Museum		Saint-Gilles	Architecture	Victor Horta	Museum of the life and work of Victor Horta situated in his former house and studio
House of European History (HEH)		City of Brussels (EU Quarter)	History	European history	Museum of European history and the history of European integration
Museum of Human Anatomy and Embryology (part of the ULB)		Anderlecht	Science		
International Puppet Museum - Peruchet		Ixelles	Cultural	Puppetry	Museum and theatre with historic puppets from around the world
Museum of Illusions		City of Brussels	Cultural	Illusions	An interactive museum with an exhibition of illusions. Located in the old "La Gaite" theatre
Museum of Ixelles		Ixelles	Art		Municipal museum with a permanent collection of paintings and hosting exhibitions
Jazz Station		Saint-Josse-ten-Noode	Music	Jazz	Museum and archive on jazz, and a venue for jazz concerts.
Jean Massart Botanical Garden (part of the ULB)		Auderghem	Nature		Research garden open to the public
Jewish Museum of Belgium		City of Brussels	Cultural	Belgian Jews	
Kanal		City of Brussels	Art	Contemporary art	Modern and contemporary art museum
La Loge		Ixelles	Art	Contemporary art	Contemporary art museum located in modernist building
Librarium (Royal Library of Belgium)		City of Brussels	Literary		Displays items from the collection of the Royal Library
Magritte Museum		City of Brussels	Art	René Magritte	Life and work of the surrealist painter René Magritte
Maurice Carême Museum		Anderlecht	Historic house	Maurice Carême	Former house of the poet Maurice Carême
Museum of Pharmacy and Medicinal Plants		Ixelles	Science		
Michel de Ghelderode Library-Museum (part of the ULB)		Ixelles	Literary		
MigratieMuseumMigration (MMM)		Molenbeek-Saint-Jean	History	Migration	
Modern Religious Art Museum		Koekelberg	Art	Religious art	Located in the Basilica of Koekelberg
Municipal Museum of Molenbeek (MoMuse)		Molenbeek-Saint-Jean	Local	Molenbeek-Saint-Jean	
Musical Instrument Museum (part of Royal Museums of Art and History)		City of Brussels	Music	Musical instruments	Located in a former Art Nouveau department store, displays its collection of 8,000 musical instruments
Oldmasters Museum		City of Brussels	Art	Fine art	Constituent part of the Royal Museums of Fine Arts of Belgium; permanent displays of European painting from the 15th to the 18th centuries
Museum of Medicine (part of the ULB)		Anderlecht	Science	Medicine	
Museum of Original Figures (MOOF)		City of Brussels	Art	Comic strips	Figurines of characters from comic strips
Museum of the National Bank of Belgium		City of Brussels	History		History and displays of banking and the history of money
National Museum of the Resistance		Anderlecht	History – Military	Belgian Resistance	Museum about the Belgian Resistance during World War II
Orthodox Church Museum		City of Brussels	Cultural		
Paul Moens Medicinal Plant Garden		Woluwe-Saint-Lambert	Nature		
Palace of Charles de Lorraine (Royal Library of Belgium)		City of Brussels	Historic house		Neoclassical palace
Parlamentarium		City of Brussels (EU Quarter)	Politics	European Parliament	Visitors' centre of the European Parliament
Pixel Museum		City of Brussels	Cultural	Video games	
Planetarium of Brussels		City of Brussels (Laeken)	Science	Astronomy	Planetarium with various shows on astronomical themes
Museum of the Police Force		Etterbeek	History	Police	
Red Cloister Art Centre		Auderghem	Art		Art exhibitions
René Magritte Museum (Jette)		Jette	Historic house	René Magritte	Former house of the surrealist artist René Magritte
Royal Belgian Institute of Natural Sciences		City of Brussels	Nature		Natural history museum with a notable collection of dinosaur skeletons
Royal Museum of the Armed Forces and Military History		City of Brussels	History – Military		Displays of Belgian military history, aircraft, armour and other arms and military vehicles
Schaerbeek Beer Museum		Schaerbeek	Industry	Brewing	Displays on history of Belgian beer, and collection of beer bottles
Sewer Museum		City of Brussels	Local	Sewers	Museum dedicated to Brussels sewer network and access to a part of the network
Spontaneous Art Museum		Schaerbeek	Art		Collection of works of naive and primitive art
Temple of Human Passions	Pavilion of the Human Passions (exterior) - Jef Lambeaux	City of Brussels	Art		Neoclassical pavilion designed by Victor Horta containing a marble relief by Jef Lambeaux
Toy Museum		City of Brussels	Children	Toys	
Train World		Schaerbeek	Transport	Rail transport	Railway museum located in Schaerbeek railway station
Villa Empain		Ixelles	Historic house		Art Deco house
Museum David and Alice van Buuren		Uccle	Historic house		Historic house and museum, furnished in Art Deco style
WIELS		Forest	Art	Contemporary art	Located in the former Blomme Building of the Wielemans-Ceuppens Brewery
Wittockiana		Woluwe-Saint-Pierre	Literary	Bookbinding	
Woluwe-Saint-Lambert Municipal Museum		Woluwe-Saint-Lambert	Local	Woluwe-Saint-Lambert	
Museum of Zoology and Anthropology (part of the ULB)		Ixelles	Nature		Collection of skeletons and stuffed animals of a wide range of species

== Former museums ==
- Scientastic Museum: closed in 2012
- Museum of Letters and Manuscripts in Brussels: closed in 2015
- NAM-IP Computer Museum: collection moved to Namur in 2015
- Underwear Museum: moved to Lessines, Hainaut, in 2016
- Charles Debuer Fencing Museum: closed
- Marc Sleen Museum: closed in 2024
- Millennium Iconoclast Museum of Art: closed in 2025
- Centrale for contemporary art: closed in 2026
