= International Puppet Museum - Peruchet =

Museum of puppets in Brussels, Belgium

- Musée international de la Marionette Peruchet (French); Internationaal Marionettenmuseum Peruchet (Dutch)
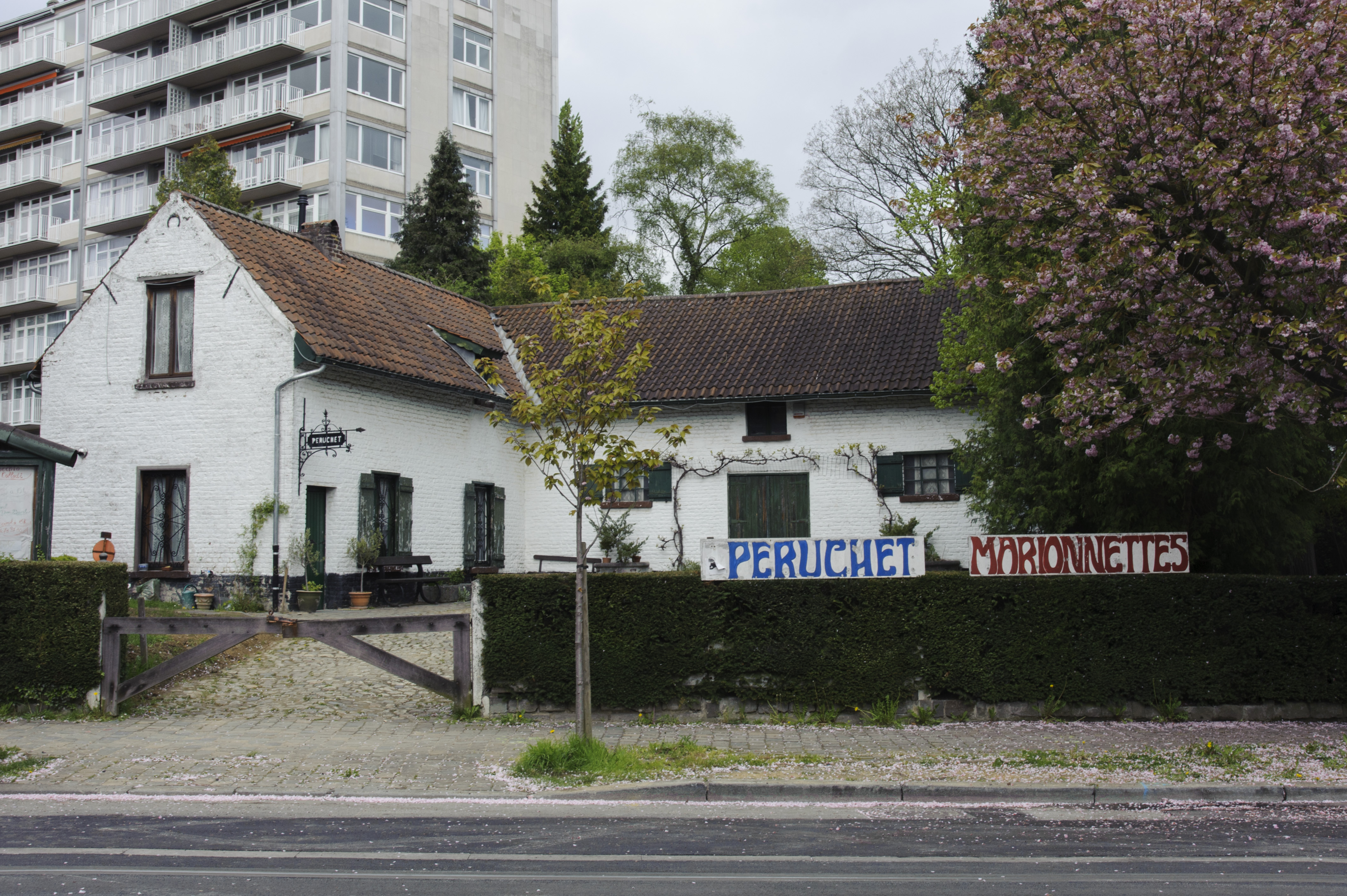
- Interactive fullscreen map
- Established: 1938; 88 years ago
- Location: Avenue de la Forêt / Woudlaan 50, 1050 Ixelles, Brussels-Capital Region, Belgium
- Coordinates: 50°48′7″N 4°23′33″E
- Type: Puppet museum
- Founder: Carlo Speder
- Director: Dimitri Jageneau
- Owner: Jageneau family
- Public transit access: Boondael station
- Website: theatreperuchet.be

The International Puppet Museum - Peruchet (French: Musée international de la Marionette Peruchet; Dutch: Internationaal Marionettenmuseum Peruchet) is a museum in Brussels, Belgium, part of the Royal Peruchet Theatre (French: Théâtre royal du Peruchet; Dutch: Koninklijk Peruchettheater).

The theatre has a history dating to 1929 and had its heyday in the 1960s when it staged hundreds of performances annually. The museum was established in 1938. It is located in an 18th-century farmhouse on the Avenue de la Forêt/Woudlaan in Ixelles.

== History ==
=== Theatre ===
Carlo Speder founded the theatre in 1929. The name "Peruchet" owes its origin to Speder's daughter who called it le théâtre de mon père chéri ("the theatre of my beloved father"). The theatre moved a few times, first in 1931 to the Rue Joseph Lebeau/Joseph Lebeaustraat in central Brussels, then in 1938 to the Chaussée de Charleroi/Charleroisesteenweg.

The Académie de la marionnette ("Academy of Puppetry") was founded in 1940. In 1950, Speder met puppeteer Franz Jageneau, an artist from the Hergé Studios. Jageneau became Speder's assistant, and in 1958, he took over the theatre's management. He was also a set designer and made over 2,000 marionettes.

In 1968, the firm relocated to the Avenue de la Forêt/Woudlaan in Ixelles, which is still its current address. In that year, Jageneau met graduate playwright and theatre director Biserka Assenova in Prague. She has specialised in the puppet theatre of such major Czech practitioners as Erik Kolar and Jan Malík. At that time, the theatre performed more than two hundred performances annually in Belgium and elsewhere in Europe.

Nowadays, the theatre continues to perform over 100 public shows a year as well as shows for schools. Apart from that, the theatre is well known for organising kids birthdays after the show. The repertoire contains most known fairy tales like Little Red Riding Hood, Puss in Boots, The Three Little Pigs, Mr. Seguin's Goat, The Curious Little Elephant, The Nutcracker, etc. The theatre also organises a festival (usually every other year) where well-known European masters play shows in their original language.

=== Museum ===
In 1938, Carlo Speder created the museum. In 1983, Jageneau and his family conceived the plan to breathe new life into the marionette collection by enlarging the museum. The museum is still located at the original address on the Avenue de la Forêt.

== Collection ==
The museum displays a collection of thousands of marionettes from different countries and cultures worldwide. There are therefore many different types of puppets in the museum, which also vary in movement techniques (e.g. string puppets, hand puppets, water puppets, bunraku style puppets, shadow puppets, etc.). There are contemporary puppets in the collection, but also 18th-century pieces that were hand-crafted with great precision. The oldest puppets come from India.

== See also ==
- List of museums in Brussels
- History of Brussels
- Culture of Belgium
