= Clockarium =

Museum of clocks in Brussels, Belgium

Clockarium, Museum of the Art Deco Ceramic Clock in Brussels
- Le Clockarium, Musée de l'horloge Art Déco en faïence à Bruxelles (French); Het Clockarium, Museum van de Art Deco faienceklok te Brussel (Dutch)
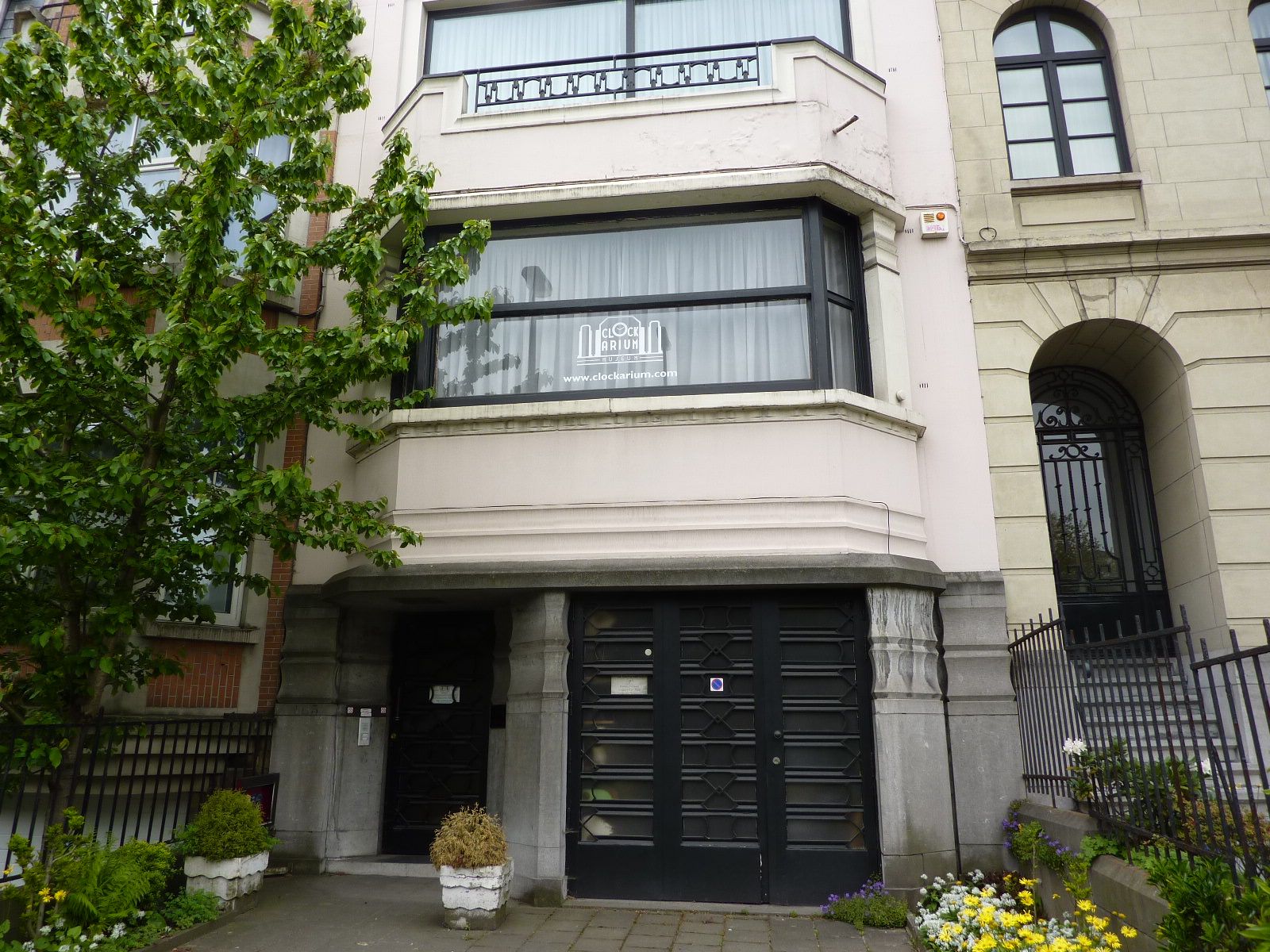
- Exterior of the museum
- Interactive fullscreen map
- Established: 2000; 26 years ago
- Location: Boulevard Auguste Reyers / Auguste Reyerslaan 163, 1030 Schaerbeek, Brussels-Capital Region, Belgium
- Coordinates: 50°50′54″N 4°24′8″E
- Type: Horological museum
- Website: www.clockarium.org

The Clockarium, Museum of the Art Deco Ceramic Clock in Brussels (French: Le Clockarium, Musée de l'horloge Art Déco en faïence à Bruxelles; Dutch: Het Clockarium, Museum van de Art Deco faienceklok te Brussel) is a museum in Schaerbeek, a municipality of Brussels, Belgium, devoted to Art Deco ceramic clocks.

The museum specialises in faience mantel clocks, which were the first timepieces affordable to everyone and decorating many homes in Belgium and Northern France during the 1920s and 1930s. It is located at 163, boulevard Auguste Reyers/Auguste Reyerslaan, in an Art Deco house built in 1935 by the architect Gustave Bossuyt.

== See also ==
- List of museums in Brussels
- History of Brussels
- Culture of Belgium
