= Autoworld (museum) =

Automobile museum in Brussels, Belgium

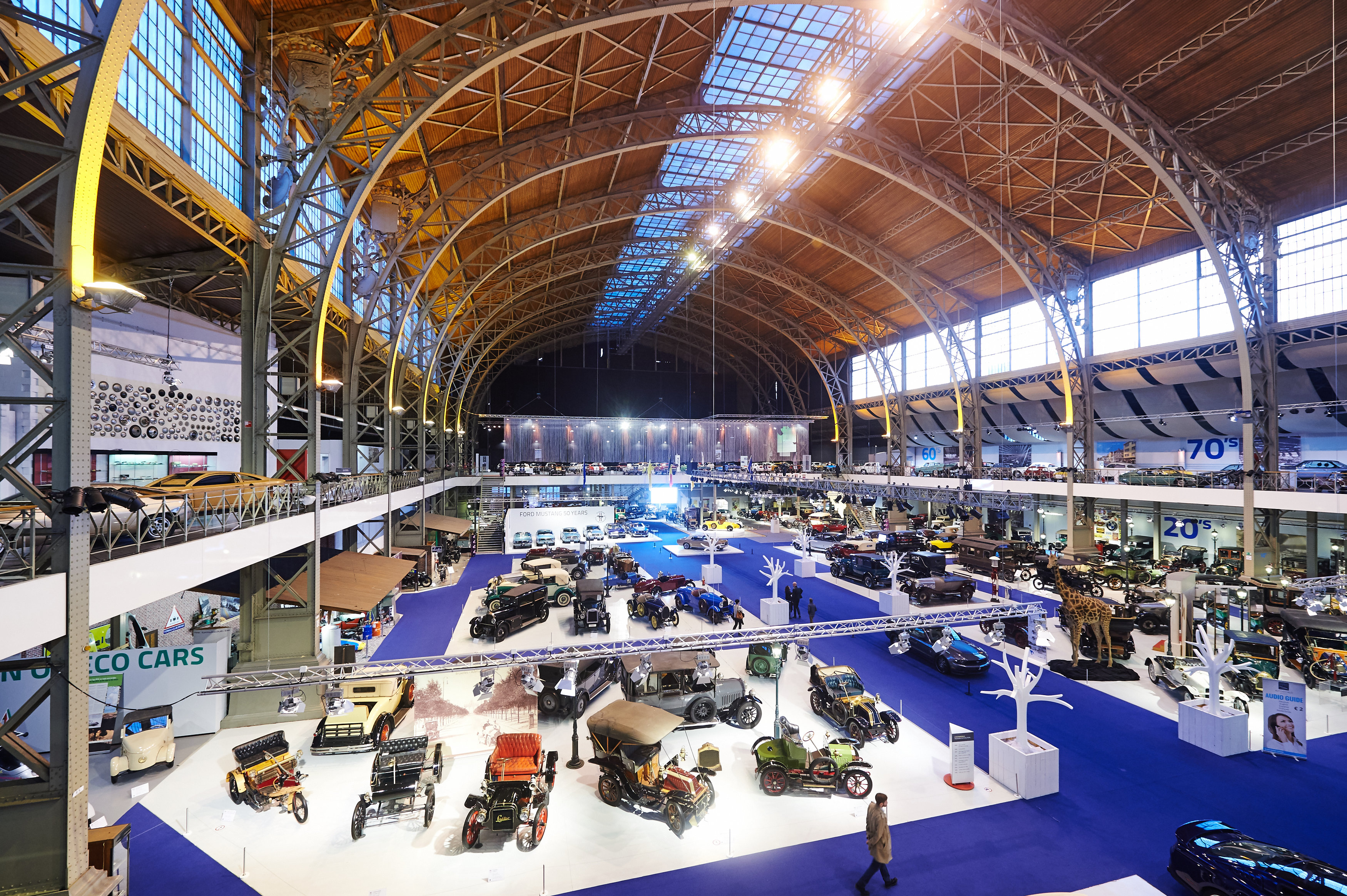
- View of Autoworld's collection in the South Hall of the Cinquantenaire complex
- Interactive fullscreen map
- Established: 29 September 1986; 39 years ago
- Location: Parc du Cinquantenaire / Jubelpark 11, 1000 City of Brussels, Brussels-Capital Region, Belgium
- Coordinates: 50°50′26″N 4°23′34″E
- Type: Automobile museum
- Public transit access: Brussels-Schuman; 1 5 Schuman and Merode
- Parking: Museum grounds
- Website: www.autoworld.be

Autoworld is an automobile museum in Brussels, Belgium. The museum displays a large and varied collection of over 300 vehicles, including cars and motorcycles from various eras, retracing the history of the industry from its birth in the 19th century to the modern age. It is notable for its collections of early and Belgian-produced vehicles, including Minervas and several limousines belonging to the Belgian royal family. In addition to its permanent collection, Autoworld regularly organises temporary exhibitions that highlight different aspects of automotive history.

The museum is housed in the South Hall of the historic complex in the Parc du Cinquantenaire/Jubelpark, next to the Art & History Museum and the Royal Museum of the Armed Forces and Military History.

== History ==
=== Origins ===
The museum was founded in 1986 through the initiative of the entrepreneur Charly De Pauw, with the support of the renowned car collector Ghislain Mahy. Mahy's passion for vintage cars began in 1944 when he purchased his first classic car, a Ford T. This vehicle marked the beginning of an extensive collection that would later grow into the Mahymobiles collection, featuring over a thousand vehicles. The Mahy collection formed the foundation of the Autoworld exhibition, as Mahy contributed a significant number of classic cars. The first vehicles displayed at Autoworld came directly from this collection. Among these early models were a 1904 Minerva Type A and a 1921 Rolls-Royce Silver Ghost.

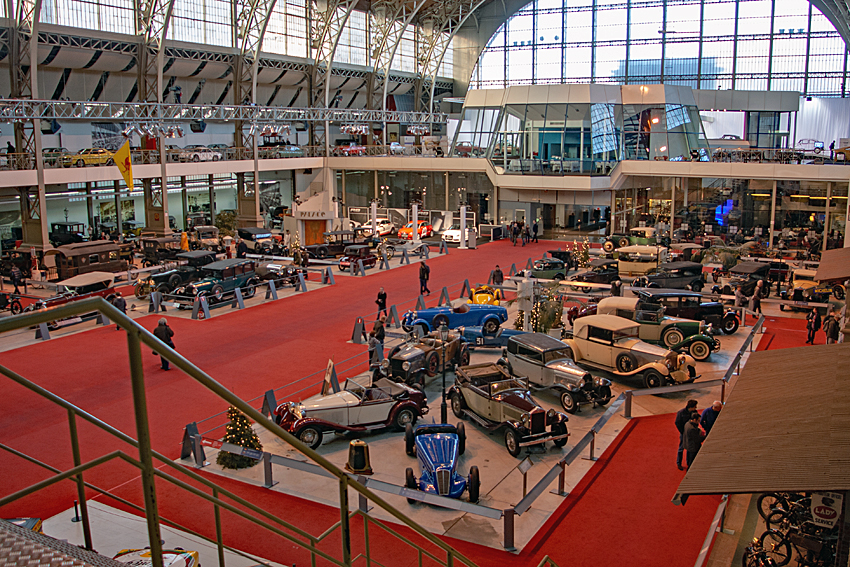
Interior of the museum in 2012, before refurbishment

Originally, the collection took shape in the former Winter Circus, a large circular building in the centre of Ghent. By the 1960s, interest in vintage vehicles grew rapidly, and Mahy began searching for a building to house Belgium's first automobile museum. Thus, in July 1970, the Provincial Automobile Museum opened in Houthalen, Belgium. However, the 1970s saw the first oil crisis, and in 1975, the museum began to suffer. In 1983, the province of Limburg decided to close the museum, but the Mahy family was authorised to take it over themselves. In 1985, the province raised the rent fivefold. The museum could not afford this increase, so the vehicles had to be relocated to another exhibition site.

=== Current museum ===
Autoworld was opened on 29 September 1986 at its current location in Brussels, following development plans signed in 1985 by the architect V. Van Zaelen. The prominent figures behind the museum project were then-Prince Albert II, Minister Louis Olivier and founding member and Honorary Chairman of the Board of Directors, Herman De Croo. At its opening, the museum contained around 200 vehicles from the Mahy collection. The remaining 750 cars are located in Mahymobiles, an automobile museum in Leuze-en-Hainaut, Belgium.

Thanks to the efforts of De Pauw and Mahy, and in collaboration with various partners, Autoworld has evolved into one of Europe's most prominent car museums. Between 2011 and 2021, Autoworld experienced significant growth, tripling both visitor numbers and revenue. By 2030, the goal is to establish itself as one of the world's leading automotive museums.

== Building ==
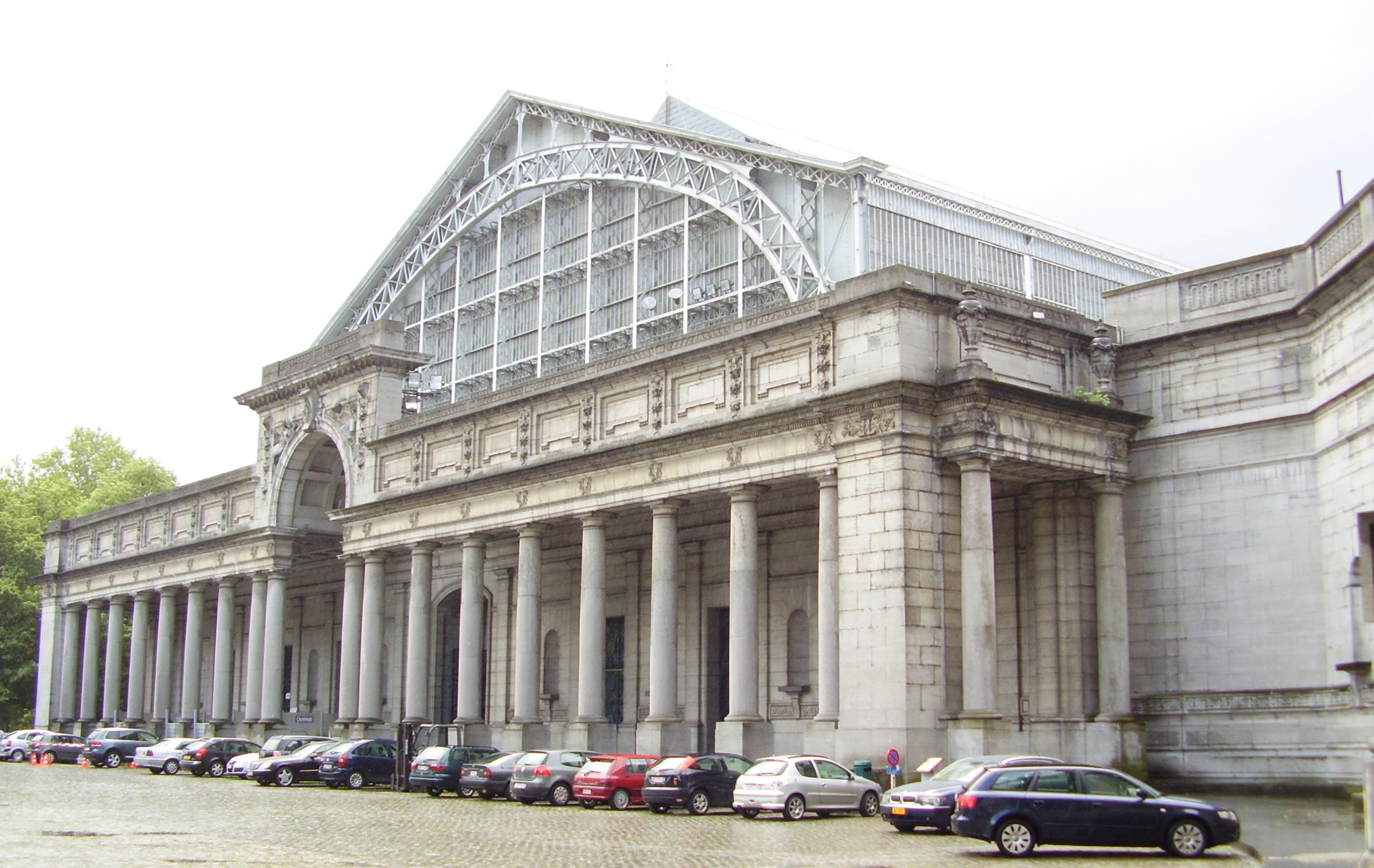
Entrance to the Palais Mondial (South Hall), housing Autoworld

Autoworld is housed in the South Hall of the Parc du Cinquantenaire/Jubelpark complex, also called the Palais Mondial ("World Palace"). This historic building was constructed in 1880 to commemorate the 50th anniversary of Belgian independence. Designed by the architect Gédéon Bordiau, the hall was originally built for the 1888 World Exhibition. The structure, characterised by its impressive metal roof construction and large glass façades, served as a venue for fairs and events in the early 20th century, including auto shows from 1902 to 1936.

Like its northern counterpart, the building has a 48-metre-wide (157 ft) nave, under a gable roof into which a long skylight with glazed sides is inserted. Equipped with a metal frame with slightly pointed arches, the 120-metre-long (390 ft) nave is flanked by 10-metre-wide (33 ft) aisles under a lean-to roof, housing a mezzanine. The hall is largely pierced with metal-framed windows.

== Collection and themes ==
Autoworld showcases vehicles from different eras, ranging from early automobiles to modern sports cars. The collection illustrates the evolution of car design and technological advancements in the industry from the end of the 19th century up to the modern age. The vehicles are arranged according to a thematic guided route that is developed, taking into account the eras and events that characterised them, with various scenographic settings. These include Minervas, a 1928 Bentley, a 1930 Bugatti and a 1930 Cord, and several limousines belonging to the Belgian royal family. In addition to passenger cars, motorcycles, sports cars, fire engines and 19th-century carriages are also on display.

The museum has developed over the years and the exhibition space is now divided into several sections. These key thematic zones include: Sport & Competition, Salon 1910, Mahy zone, Belgian zone, Workshops, Thiry zone, Royal zone, Media Room, '50s zone, Pierre D'Ieteren zone, Electric zone, Supercars zone, Belgian motorcycles, Auto Design Story, Comic book zone: Michel Vaillant, and Cars of Tintin.

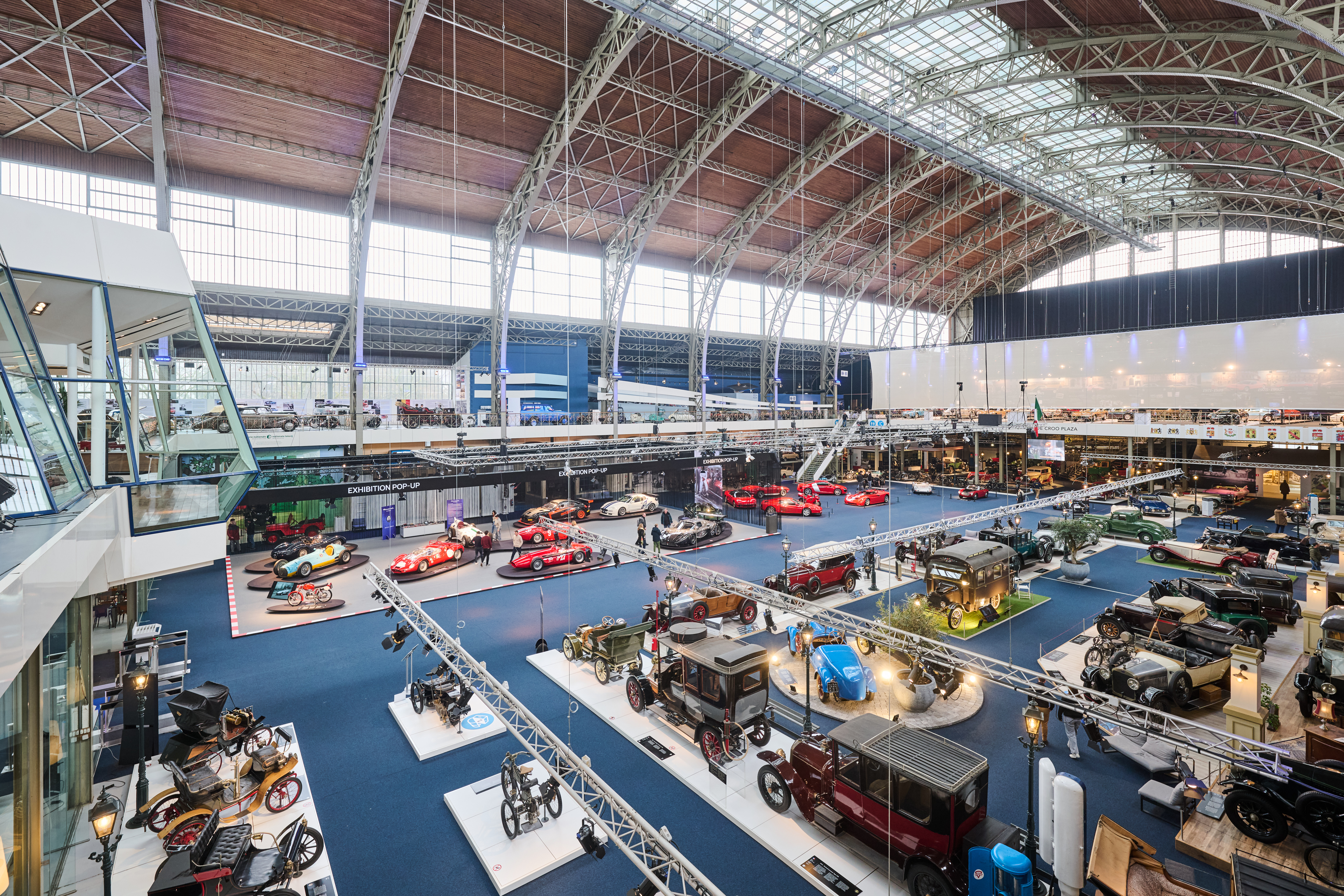
General view

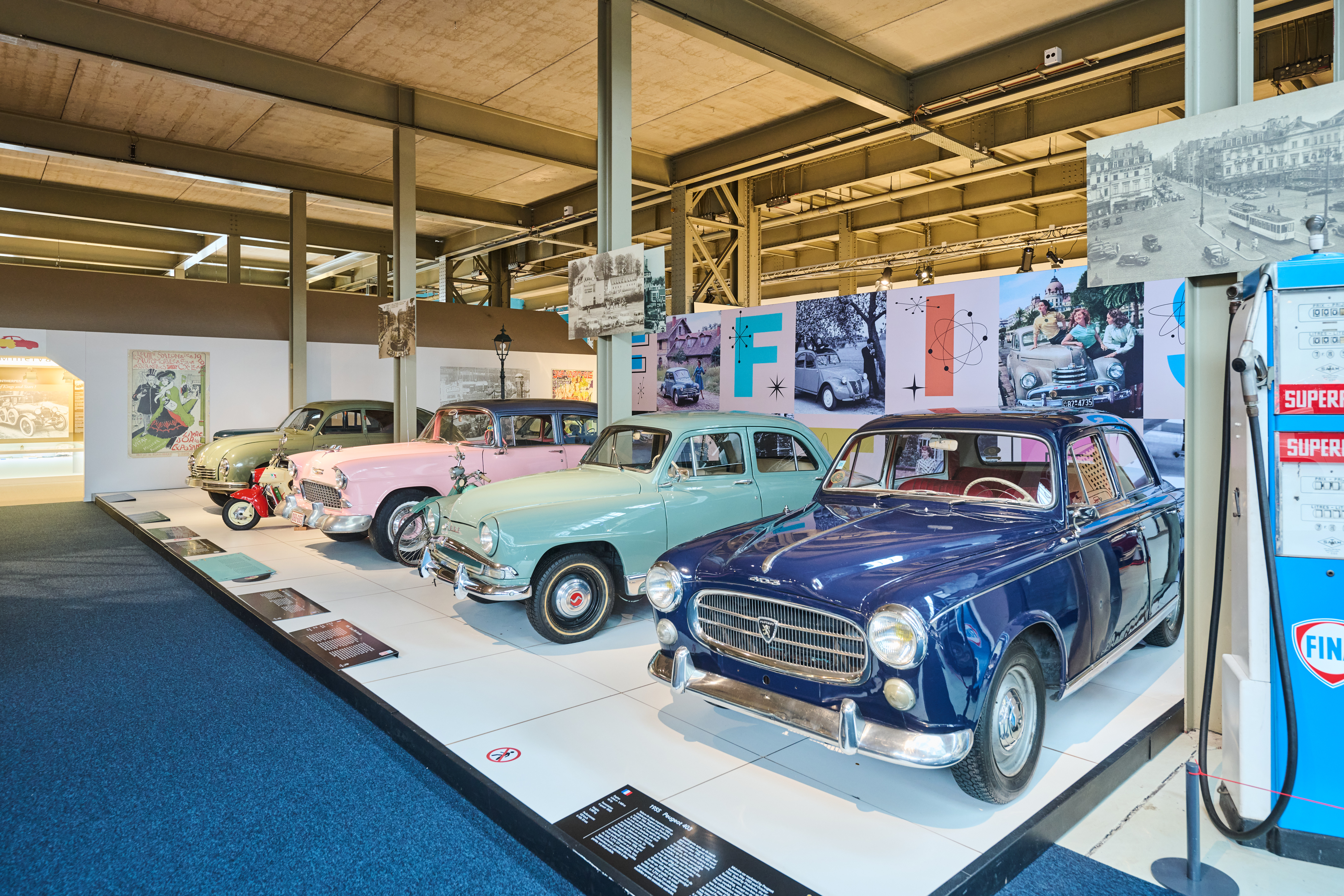
'50s zone

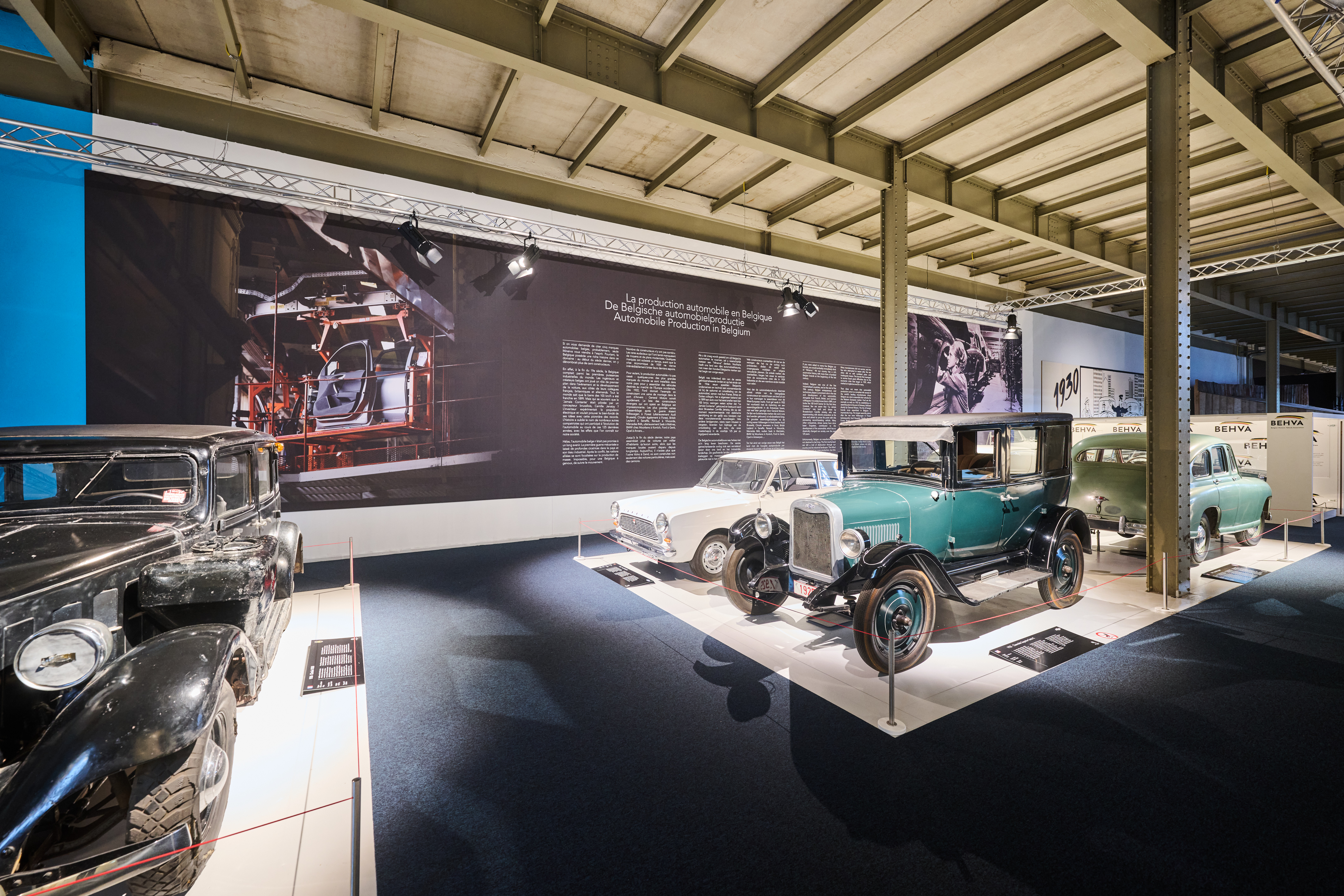
Belgian zone

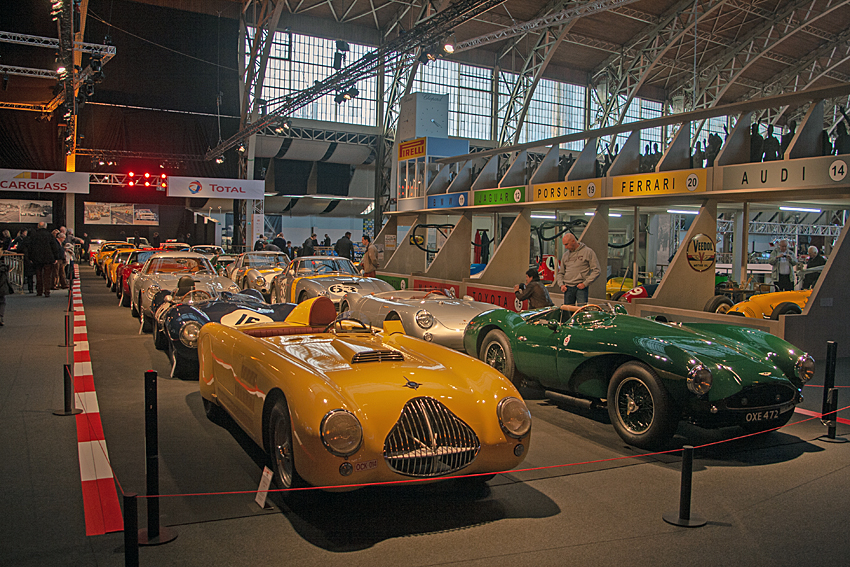
Early version of the Competition zone

== Events and activities ==
Autoworld is also an event venue, hosting numerous car-related events throughout the year, such as:

- Classic car shows;
- Thematic exhibitions on specific events, brands, or models;
- Corporate events and gala evenings;
- Educational workshops and guided tours.

== See also ==
- List of museums in Brussels
- History of Brussels
- Culture of Belgium
- Belgium in the long nineteenth century
