= Archives of the City of Brussels =

Public archive of the City of Brussels, Belgium

- Archives de la Ville de Bruxelles (French); Archief van de Stad Brussel (Dutch)
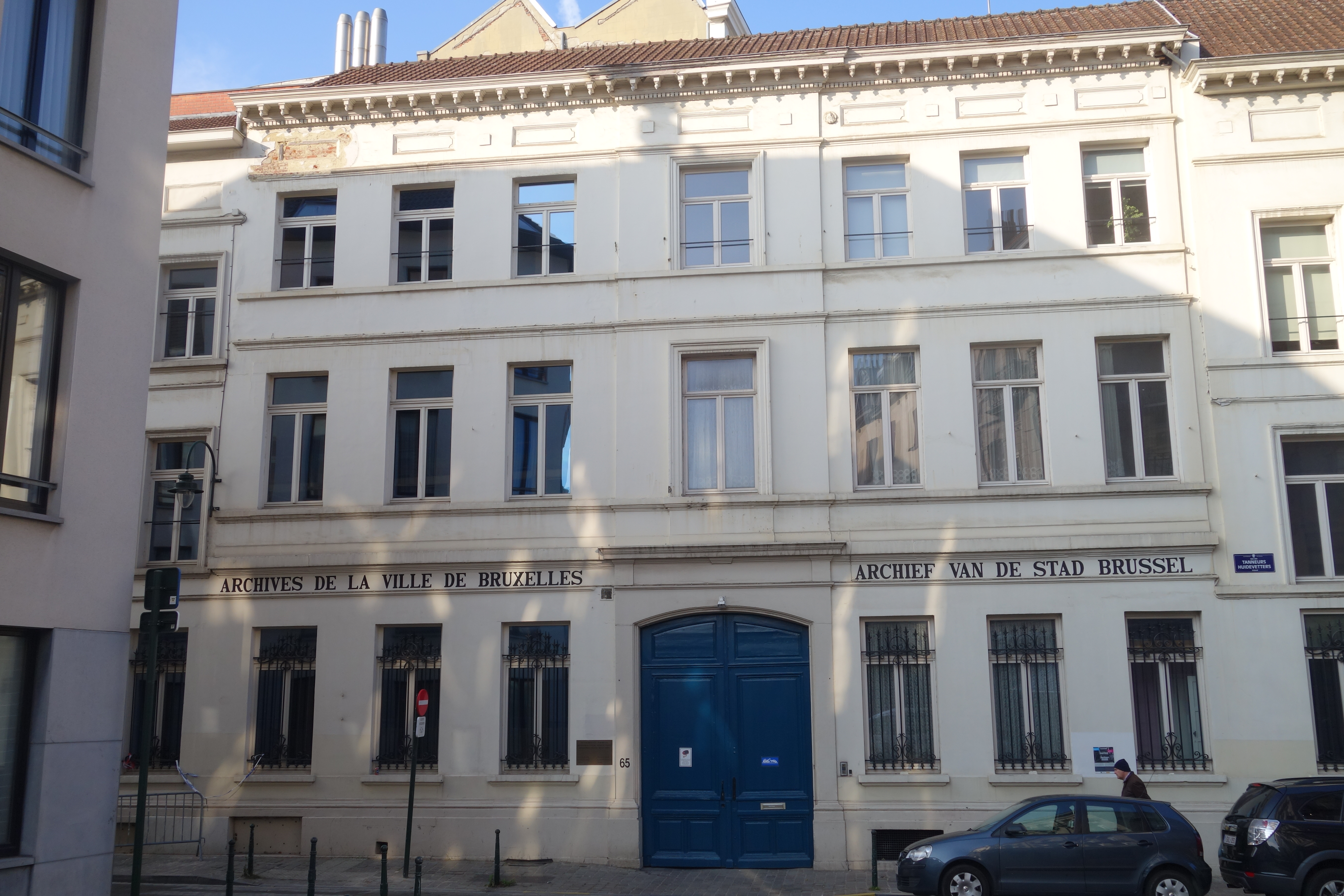
- Exterior of the museum
- Interactive fullscreen map
- Location: Rue des Tanneurs / Huidevettersstraat 65, 1000 City of Brussels, Brussels-Capital Region, Belgium
- Coordinates: 50°50′23″N 4°20′48″E
- Type: National archives
- Website: archives.brussels.be

The Archives of the City of Brussels (French: Archives de la Ville de Bruxelles; Dutch: Archief van de Stad Brussel) preserves documents related to the City of Brussels (Belgium) and its history. It holds the third largest collection of newspapers and periodicals in Belgium. The public can access its collections through its online catalog, visiting the archive itself, or visiting a museum exhibiting loaned items.

== History ==
Archives were first kept in Brussels in the Church of St. Michael and St. Gudula (now the cathedral) and the Church of St. Nicholas' tower. In the 16th century, these collections were joined together in the Town Hall. In the 17th century, the collection was moved to two buildings on the Grand-Place/Grote Markt (Brussels' main square). These buildings and some of the city's records were destroyed during the Nine Years' War.

In 1979, the Archives moved into a complex of buildings that formerly housed a textile business. The building is noted as an example of early 20th-century commercial architecture.

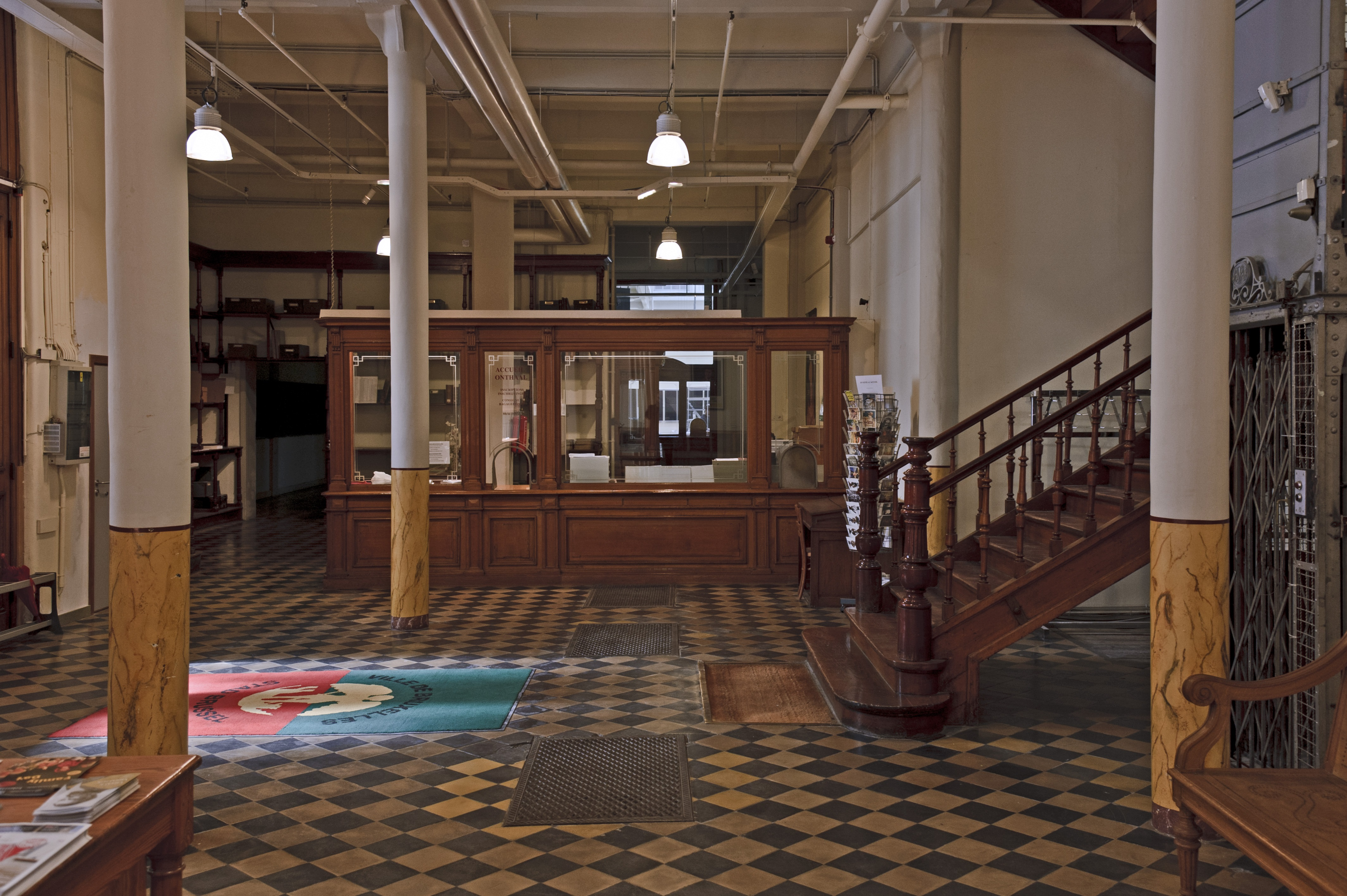
Entrance

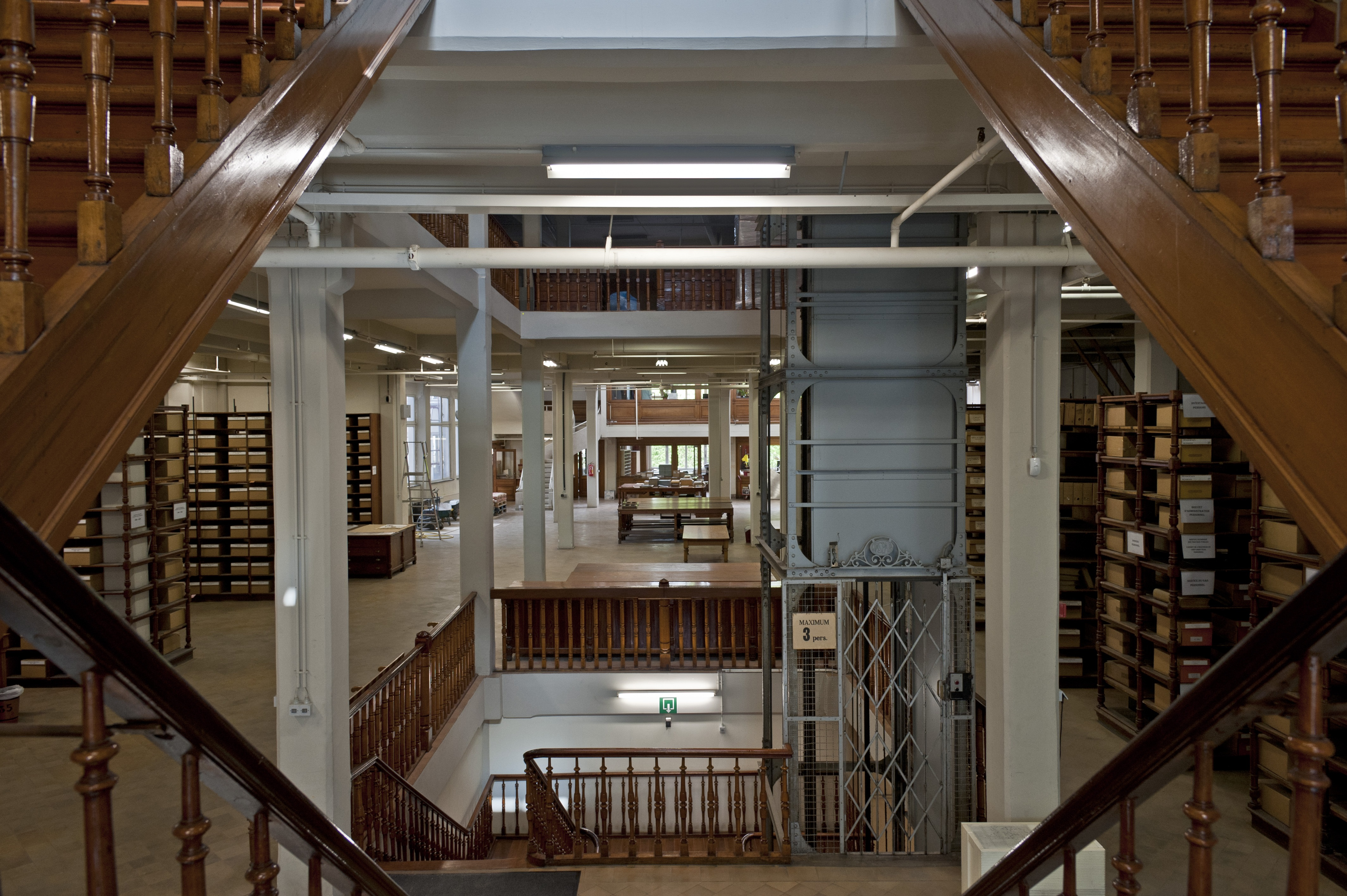
Interior view

== See also ==
- List of museums in Brussels
- History of Brussels
- Culture of Belgium
- Belgium in the long nineteenth century
