= Toy Museum (Brussels) =

Museum of toys and games in Brussels, Belgium

- Musée du jouet (French); Speelgoedmuseum (Dutch)
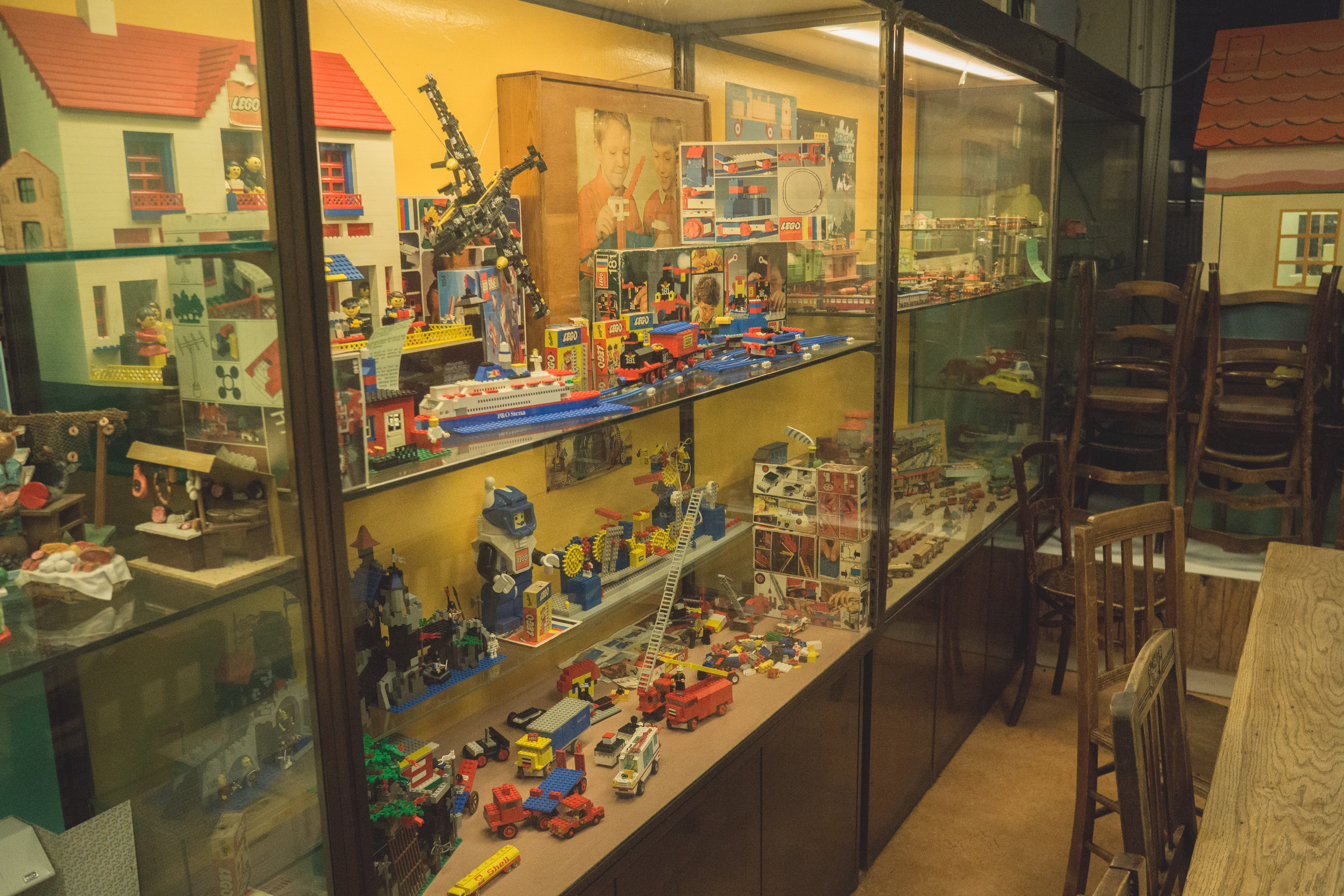
- Display case exhibiting vintage Lego sets
- Interactive fullscreen map
- Established: 14 November 1990; 35 years ago
- Dissolved: 1 July 2018; 8 years ago
- Location: Rue de l'Association / Verenigingstraat 24, 1000 City of Brussels, Brussels-Capital Region, Belgium
- Coordinates: 50.851944°N 4.365833°E
- Type: Children's museum
- Collections: Toys, games
- Collection size: 25,000

The Toy Museum (French: Musée du jouet; Dutch: Speelgoedmuseum) was a museum of toys and games in Brussels, Belgium. Opened on 14 November 1990, the core collection was amassed by a family of amateur toy enthusiasts and grew through public donations as well as purchases.

The museum was housed in a former mansion with 1,000 m^{2} (11,000 sq ft) of exhibition space on three floors, located at 24, rue de l'Association/Verenigingstraat, in the Freedom Quarter. It housed over 25,000 historic toys and games, mostly from the 1950s to the 1980s, with the oldest dating back to 1830. It was owned and operated by the late André Raemdonck. It closed permanently in 2018.

== History ==
A first initiative had been attempted in 1984 to participate in the renewal of the Anspach Center, an old department store that had declined years before. This had prompted André Raemdonck and his team to mount a temporary toy exhibition there for one or two months. It was such a success that a permanent Toy Museum was established in 1985, but the centre was closed three years later. Negotiations were then undertaken with the City of Brussels, primarily with its First Alderman, Michel Demaret, in order to find a new and larger space. On 14 November 1990, the museum reopened in a former mansion dating from 1878, located at 24, rue de l'Association/Verenigingstraat. It spanned three exhibition floors.

The museum closed at the beginning of July 2018, following negative advice from the Brussels Fire and Emergency Medical Service (SIAMU), stating that the building was no longer safe for visitors. It never reopened. In June 2020, the museum's director, André Raemdonck, died, leaving his daughter Dominique to seek solutions. That same year, the building's owner, the French Community Commission (COCOF), withdrew its subsidy because it wanted the institution to move, in order to renovate the building. In January 2026, the Raemdonck family began a clearance sale to vacate the premises.

== See also ==
- List of museums in Brussels
- History of Brussels
- Culture of Belgium
