= Pixel Museum =

Defunct museum in Brussels, Belgium

- Dissolved: 2024
- Location: Tour & Taxis, Brussels, Belgium
- Coordinates: 50°51′48″N 4°20′50″E

The Pixel Museum (French: Le refuge des pixels et des jeux vidéo) is a video game museum located in Brussels, Belgium, on the site of the Tour & Taxis neighborhood, open from October 2020 to December 2024.

== History ==
The Pixel Museum is directed by Jérôme Hatton and is the product of the Ludus Institut association, which also runs the Ludus Academy, a serious game development school. Preparations for the Pixel Museum's opening lasted five years. The museum was inaugurated on February 25, 2017. Approximately three months later, it had welcomed 10,000 visitors, and 26,000 after one year.

In October 2020, the museum reopened in Brussels.

In December 2024, the museum closed again, this time permanently. Its founder announced his intention to sell his collection.
