= Brasserie de la Senne =

Belgian brewery

Coordinates: 50.8602°N 4.3084°E

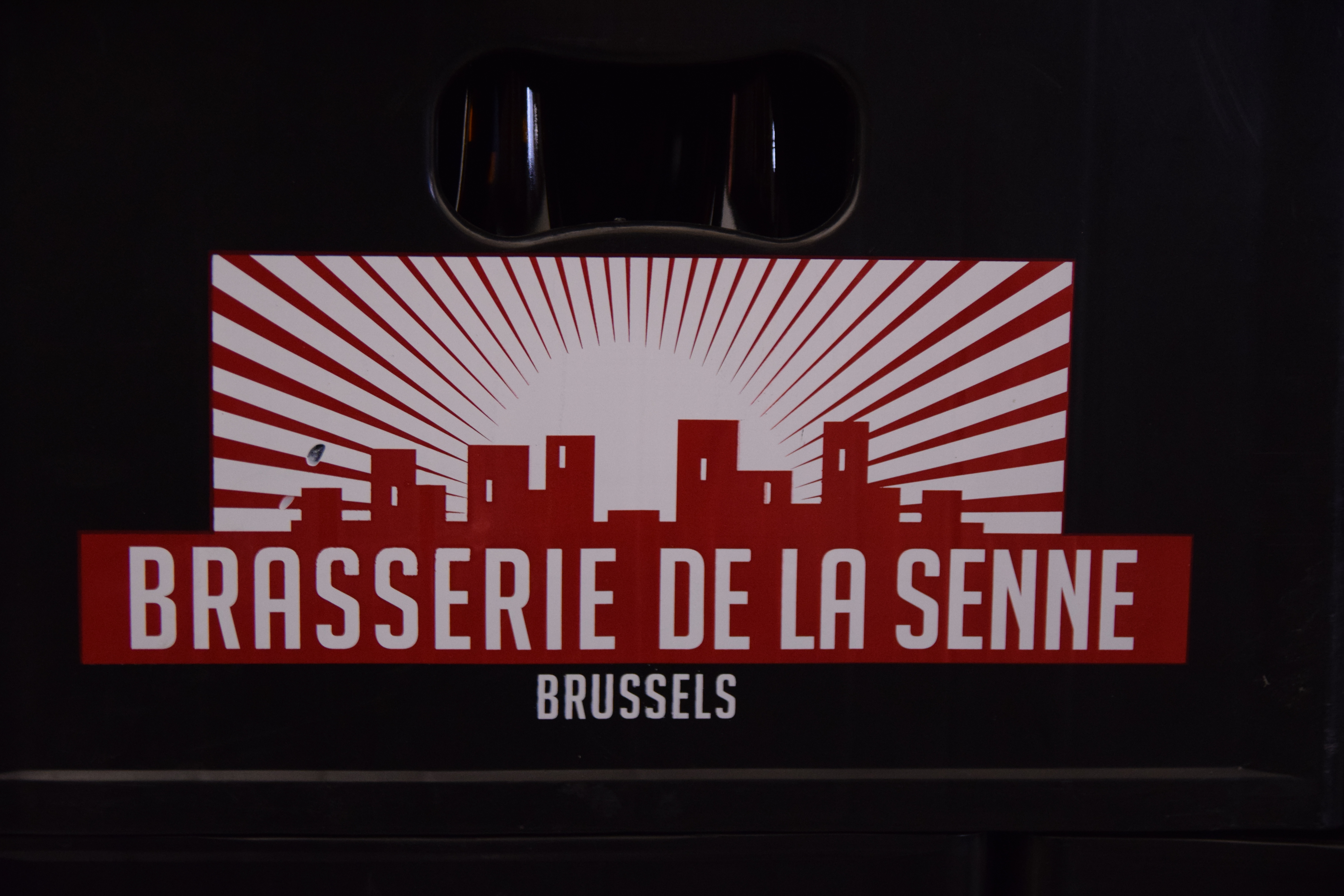

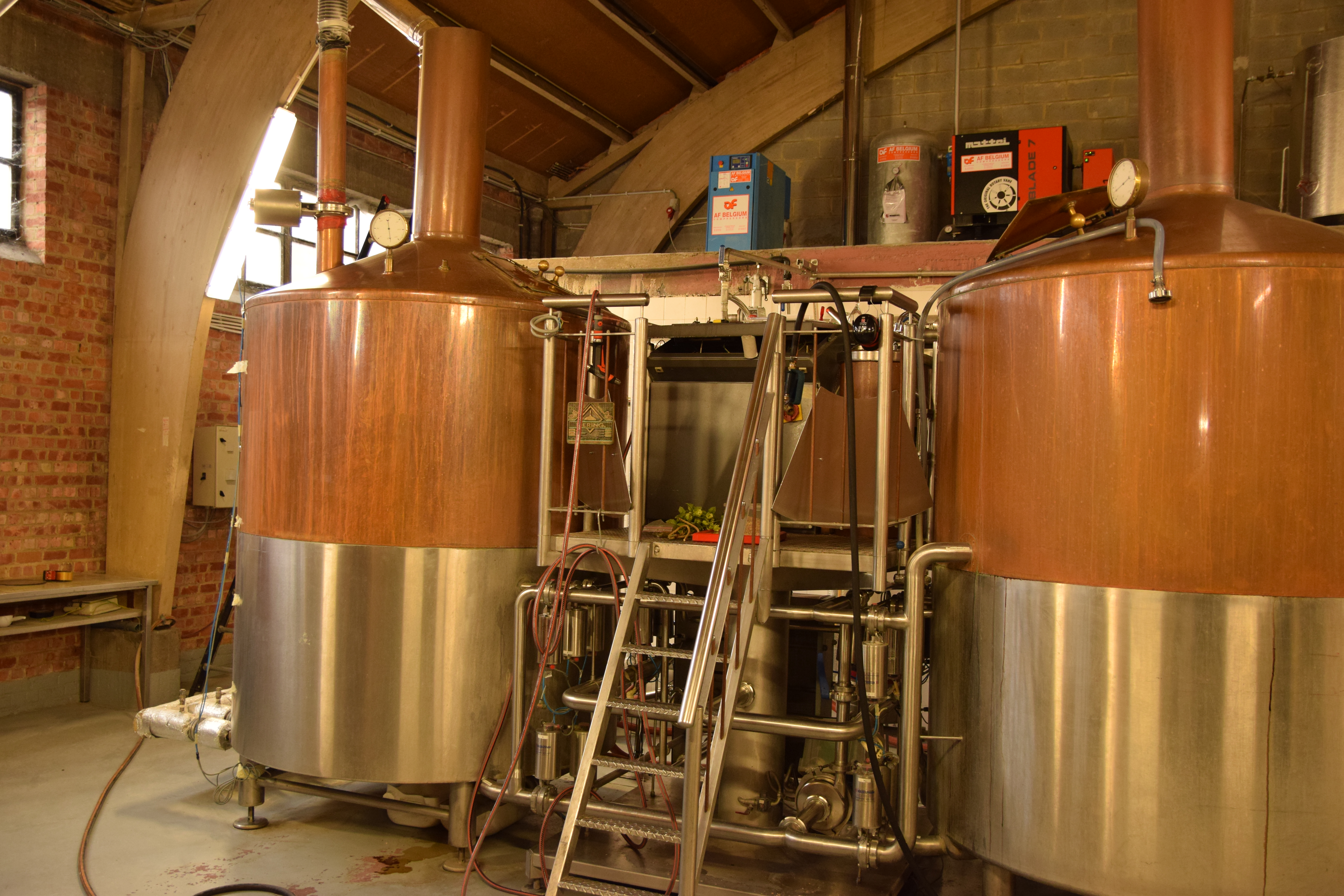
- Type: Brasserie
- Location: Molenbeek-Saint-Jean, Brussels, Belgium
- Opened: 2003
- Key people: Bernard Leboucq; Yvan De Baets
- Annual production volume: 1,800 hectolitres (1,500 US bbl)

Inactive beers
Name	Type
Manneken-Penn	See text
Gray Jacket	See text

Brasserie de la Senne is a brewery in Brussels, Belgium, named for the river Senne which flows through the city.

== History ==
De La Senne is the initiative of Bernard Leboucq and Yvan De Baets. Leboucq set up the St. Peter's Brewery in the former lambic brewery Moriau in Sint-Pieters-Leeuw in 2003. He moved on to create Zinnebir, named after the Zinneke Parade. De Baets worked at Brouwerij De Ranke in Dottignies/Dottenijs. The two decided to start a brewery together in 2006. As the building in Sint-Pieters-Leeuw was no longer available, they brewed provisionally at the De Ranke and Proef breweries. Meanwhile the brewers searched for and found a suitable location in Brussels, a former industrial bakery in Molenbeek-Saint-Jean. A first test batch was brewed in the new premises at the end of 2010. The brewery has a reputation for brewing fine ales and "frustratingly rare blends" that often include lambic from the nearby Cantillon Brewery.

In 2013 they collaborated with Pennsylvania's Weyerbacher Brewing Company to produce a beer called Manneken-Penn and with Washington, DC's Bluejacket brewery on a beer called Gray Jacket, in the style of the beer formerly made for miners in the Hainaut province of Belgium.

== Procedure ==
Leboucq and De Baets do everything themselves, using traditional methods. The beers are neither filtered nor pasteurised, and no additives are added. The philosophy of the brewers is to brew beers that are characterful, but not necessarily strong. Two 20-hectolitre brews take place each week, giving an annual production of 1,800 hectolitres. The demand for the beers currently exceeds production capacity.

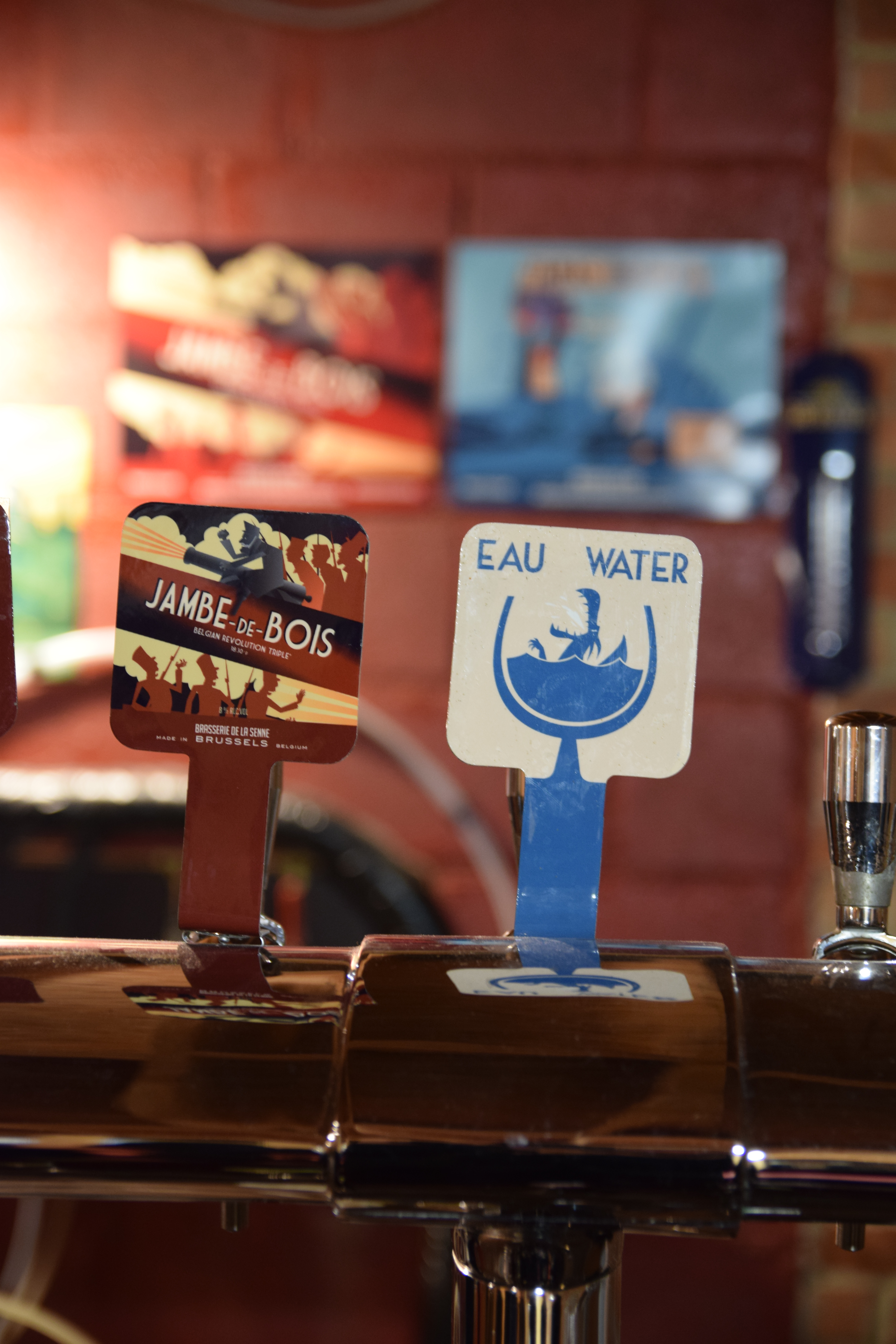
Beer and water taps in Brasserie de la Senne

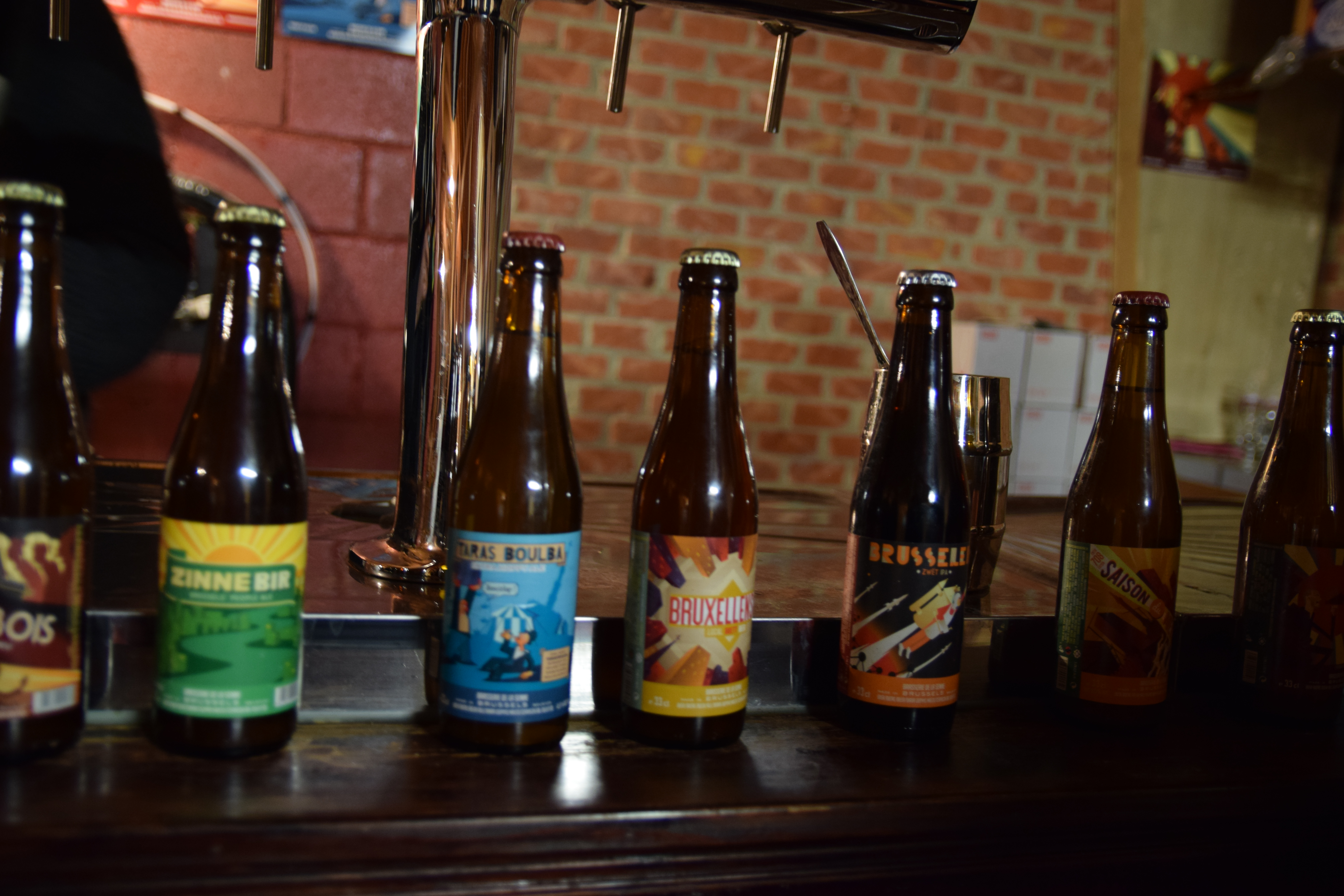
Various beers from Brasserie de la Senne
