= Erasmus House =

Museum in Brussels, Belgium

- Maison d'Érasme (French); Erasmushuis (Dutch)
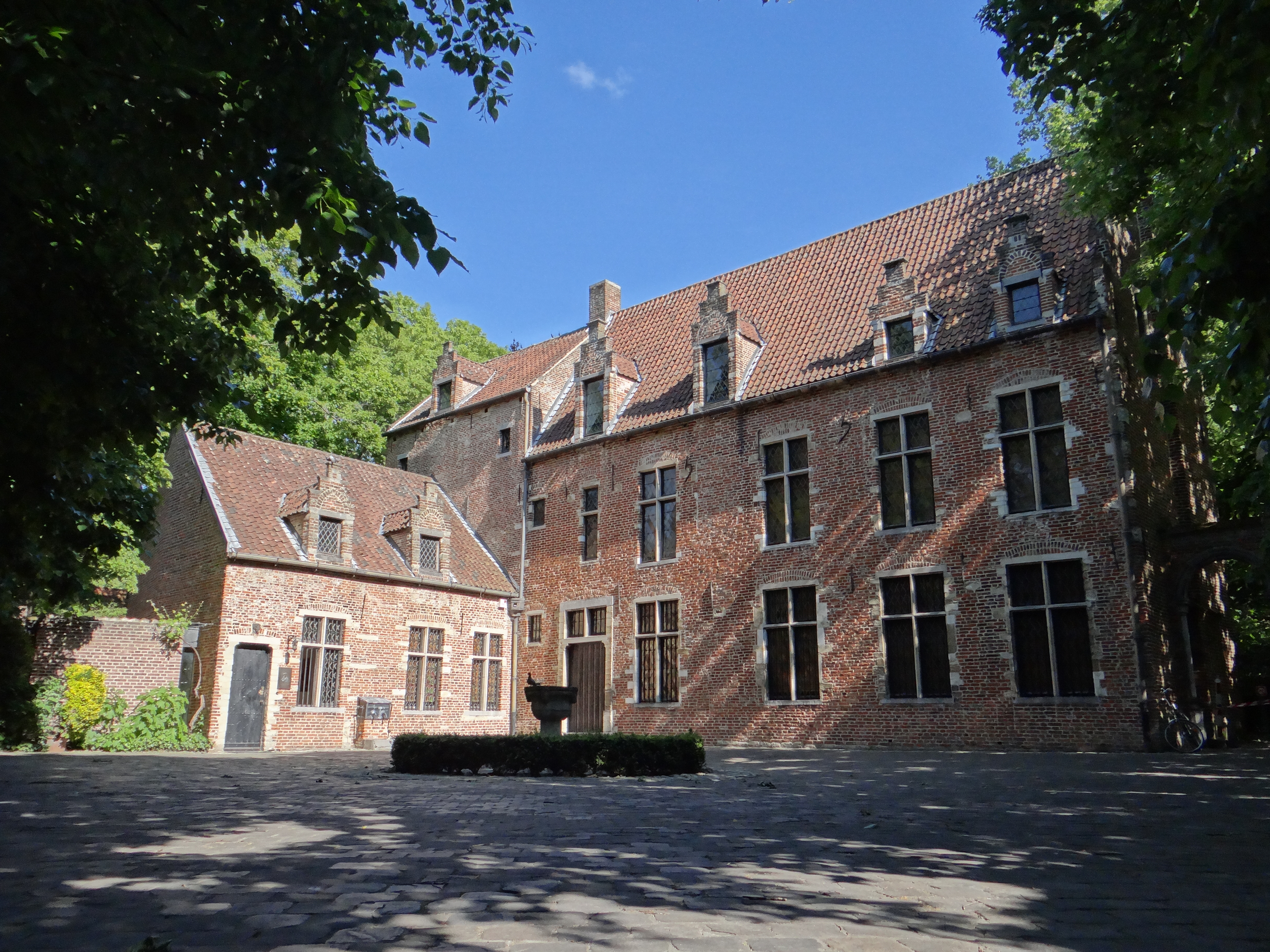
- Exterior of the Erasmus House
- Interactive fullscreen map
- Established: 1931; 95 years ago
- Location: Rue de Formanoir / De Formanoirstraat 31, 1070 Anderlecht, Brussels-Capital Region, Belgium
- Coordinates: 50°50′11″N 4°18′29″E
- Public transit access: 5 Saint-Guidon/Sint-Guido
- Website: www.erasmushouse.museum/en

The Erasmus House (French: Maison d'Érasme; Dutch: Erasmushuis), also known as the Erasmus House Museum (French: Musée de la Maison d'Érasme; Dutch: Erasmushuismuseum), and formerly as the De Swaene chapter house, is a historic house museum in Anderlecht, a municipality of Brussels, Belgium, devoted to the Dutch humanist writer and theologian Erasmus of Rotterdam.

The house, of late Gothic or early Renaissance style, was built between 1460 and 1515 under the tutelage of Peter Wijchmans, canon and schoolmaster of the chapter of Anderlecht, and a friend of Erasmus. Erasmus stayed there for five months, from May to October 1521, working on his translation of his Novum Testamentum from Greek into Latin. The house was converted to a museum in 1931. Its garden is divided into two sections, both inspired by Erasmus's spirit: one through art and philosophy and the other, designed by René Pechère, through typical 16th-century medicinal plants. The complex was designated a historic monument in 1938.

The Erasmus House stands close to the 14th-century Collegiate Church of St. Peter and St. Guido, a Gothic church dedicated to Saint Guy of Anderlecht, who was buried there in the 11th century, as well as the old beguinage of Anderlecht, a late medieval lay convent, now a museum dedicated to religious community life. Both institutions are now managed jointly as the Erasmus House & Beguinage Museums (French: Musées Maison d'Erasme & Béguinage; Dutch: Erasmushuis & Begijnhofmusea).

== History ==
=== Construction (c. 1460–1515) ===
The red-bricked building known today as the Erasmus House was constructed in stages, between 1460 and 1515, in late Gothic or early Renaissance style. This property, originally known as De Swaene, was once the country estate of the family of Brussels bankers and money changers Suweel. At that time, Anderlecht was still a village on the outskirts of Brussels counting barely 300 inhabitants.

Enclosed by a brick wall, the house consists of several wings. The oldest part, high, narrow, with a gently sloping roof, was built around 1460 by Peeter Wijchmans, official money changer of the City of Brussels. The long wing to its right was built in 1515, as indicated by the wall anchors on the façade, for Peter Wijchmans, canon and schoolmaster of the chapter of Anderlecht (which was attached to the Collegiate Church of St. Peter and St. Guido from 1507), who had probably inherited the property. The date of construction of the building's lowest part is unknown; however, it is known that it was used as a stable at the end of the 16th century. It now houses the museum's reception. The ensemble is preceded by an interior courtyard.

A man of culture, Canon Wijchmans gladly welcomed scholars and intellectuals to his residence in Anderlecht, among them the Dutch humanist writer and theologian Erasmus of Rotterdam with whom a friendship was established. It is possible that Erasmus, a prolific traveller, stayed several times with his friend Wijchmans, but it is from his five-month stay from May to October 1521 that traces remain.

=== Visit of Erasmus (1521) ===
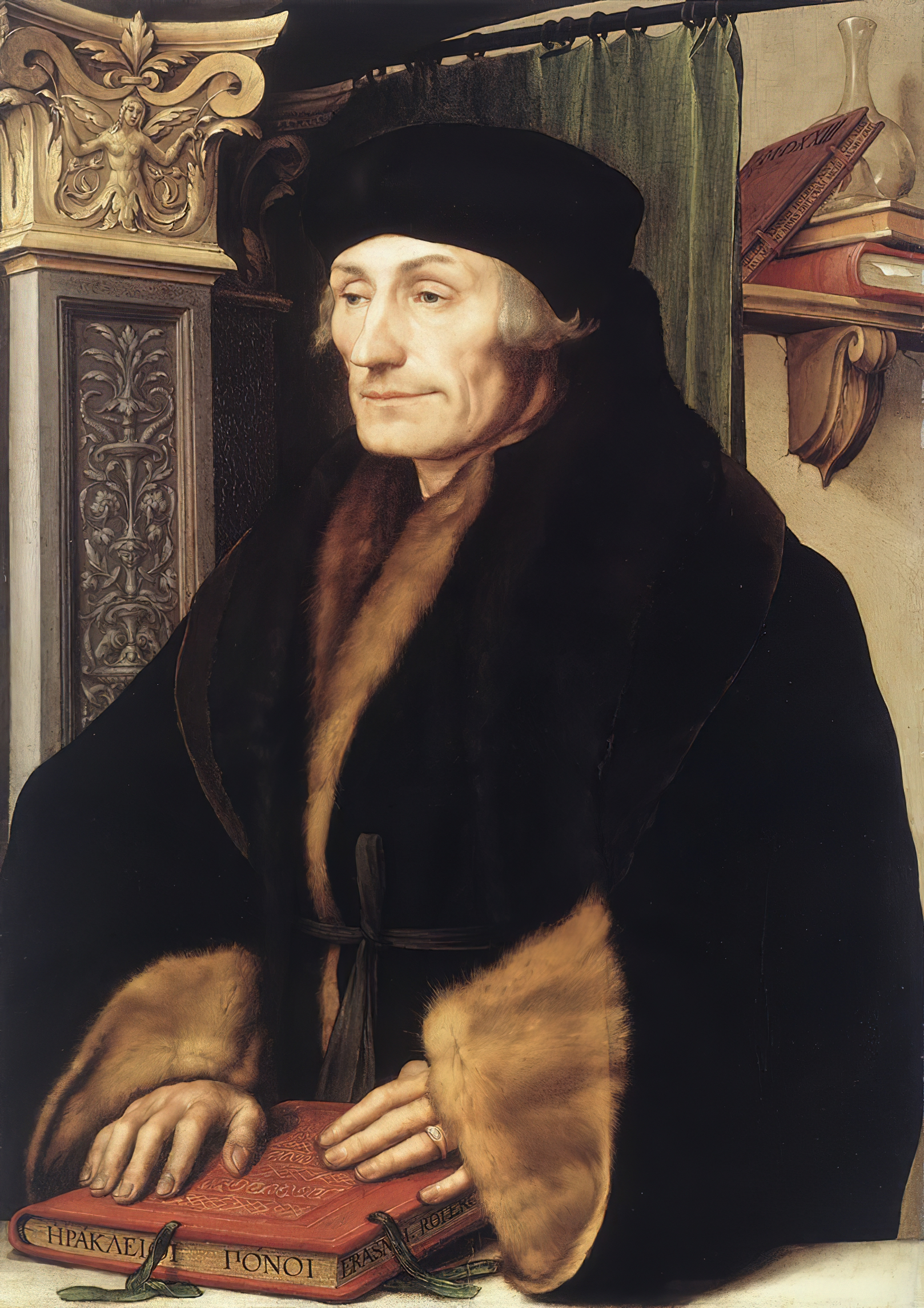
Portrait of Erasmus of Rotterdam, Hans Holbein the Younger, 1523

Departing from the nearby Flemish town of Leuven, where he lectured at the Old University, Erasmus arrived in Anderlecht in May 1521. This move was first of all made for health reasons as he suffered from persistent fevers, and as he wrote himself, believed the country life would do him good. In September 1521, he sent these words to the French scholar and humanist Guillaume Budé:

I am writing to you these lines from our countryside in Anderlecht, where, driven by your example, I too began to live in the fields. (...) Anyway, this rustic life does me so much good that I am now willing to repeat it every year.

There were also political and religious reasons behind his decision: Martin Luther had just been excommunicated (1520) and the reformer's sympathisers were persecuted. In addition, Erasmus's attitude towards the Roman Catholic ecclesiastical institution aroused strong criticism at the time from traditional theologians. His books and ideas contributed to the blossoming Protestant Reformation by advocating a personal faith and the active practice of evangelical values, though he never became a Protestant himself and died within the Catholic faith. Erasmus thus considered it prudent to move away from the University of Leuven, a place of passionate theological debates, for protection, by getting closer to the court of the young emperor Charles V, established at the Coudenberg Palace in the heart of Brussels, to whom he had been appointed adviser a few years earlier.

During his time in Anderlecht, Erasmus worked on a copy of his Novum Testamentum with a view to editing a new translation from Greek into Latin. For the same reasons of personal safety, however, Erasmus left Anderlecht for Basel in October 1521, after just five months.

=== Later history ===
In the aftermath of the French Revolution, the Erasmus House became a civilian residence before it was purchased, in 1931, by the local council, which transformed it into a museum dedicated to the Renaissance humanist. The building, which had preserved its original layout and had been well respected over time, required no heavy-handed restoration; it was instead carefully arranged as a museum, along with its enclosed park. Following a restoration campaign led by the architect Charles Van Elst in a spirit of the purest historicism, the Erasmus House Museum was inaugurated on 24 September 1932 in the presence of Duke and Duchess of Brabant.

The house was classified as a historic monument on 25 October 1938, and the garden was inscribed on the safeguard list as a site in 1998.

== Museum ==
The museum is dedicated to Erasmus's life and work and evokes the intellectual world of the Renaissance through a collection of artworks presented in an interior reconstituted using Gothic and Renaissance furniture. The core of the collection is made up of numerous 16th-century books, retracing the thought of this humanist who deeply marked European civilisation. In addition to an important collection of Erasmus's writings, the museum also houses paintings by Hans Holbein the Younger, Hieronymus Bosch, Albrecht Dürer, Cornelis Massijs and Joos van Cleve, as well as 17th-century murals. Furthermore, there are various sculptures, historical furniture, as well as a study centre. Special exhibitions and cultural events also take place there on a regular basis.

=== Rhetoric Room ===
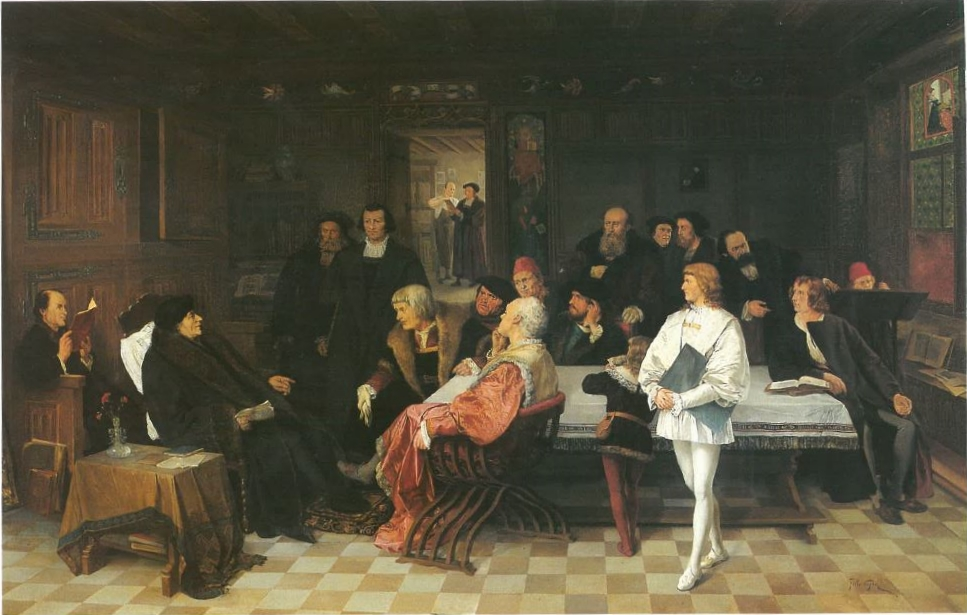
Last Stay of Erasmus in Basel in 1535, Félix Cogen, 1907

Located on the ground floor, the Rhetoric Room is the place where, according to tradition, Erasmus received visitors. It is adorned with period furniture, as well as the large painting Last Stay of Erasmus in Basel in 1535 (1907) by Félix Cogen, where an elderly Erasmus is seen listened to by other humanists and scientists gathered in the office of the printer Johann Froben. Above the fireplace hangs a painting of Adrian VI, canon of the chapter of Anderlecht, tutor to the future Charles V and the only pope from the Netherlands.

=== Work cabinet ===
A room overlooking the garden, which was Erasmus's study. A seat and writing desk recreate the atmosphere of the time. The work table is not that of Erasmus since the latter wrote standing on a lectern or dictated a lot of his texts to famuli (i.e. secretaries). A series of portraits of the humanist have been collected there, including paintings by Quentin Matsys, Hans Holbein and Albrecht Dürer. Erasmus's correspondence shows that he was in contact with the personalities of his time: Thomas More, Francis I, Charles V, and Martin Luther, to name a few.

=== Renaissance Room ===
The Renaissance Room, lined with Córdoba leather with gold leaf prints, is adorned with Flemish school paintings of the 15th and 16th centuries, such as ones by Hieronymus Bosch, Quentin Matsys, and Pieter Huys. In the middle of the ceiling hangs an impressive wrought iron chandelier. The space between the room's windows has been gradually reduced in order to give the room an appearance of perspective (clearly visible from the outside).

=== White Room ===
The large upstairs room, called the "White Room" or "Frescoes Room", now painted purple, may have been the dining room. The original editions of Erasmus's books, arranged according to the printers to whom they had been entrusted, were displayed there in showcases. They have now been replaced with copies. The first showcase exhibits numerous editions and translations of In Praise of Folly, the second one editions of the Colloquies. Another showcase contains books redacted by ecclesiastical censorship. Using the three classical languages in some of his writings (Latin, Greek and Hebrew), Erasmus worked with the best printers of his time, including Johann Froben of Basel, Switzerland, and personally revised the printing proofs. An imposing Flemish copper chandelier with a double row of lights also hung in the middle of the room. Pieces of frescoes, which probably lined the top of the room, have also been saved.

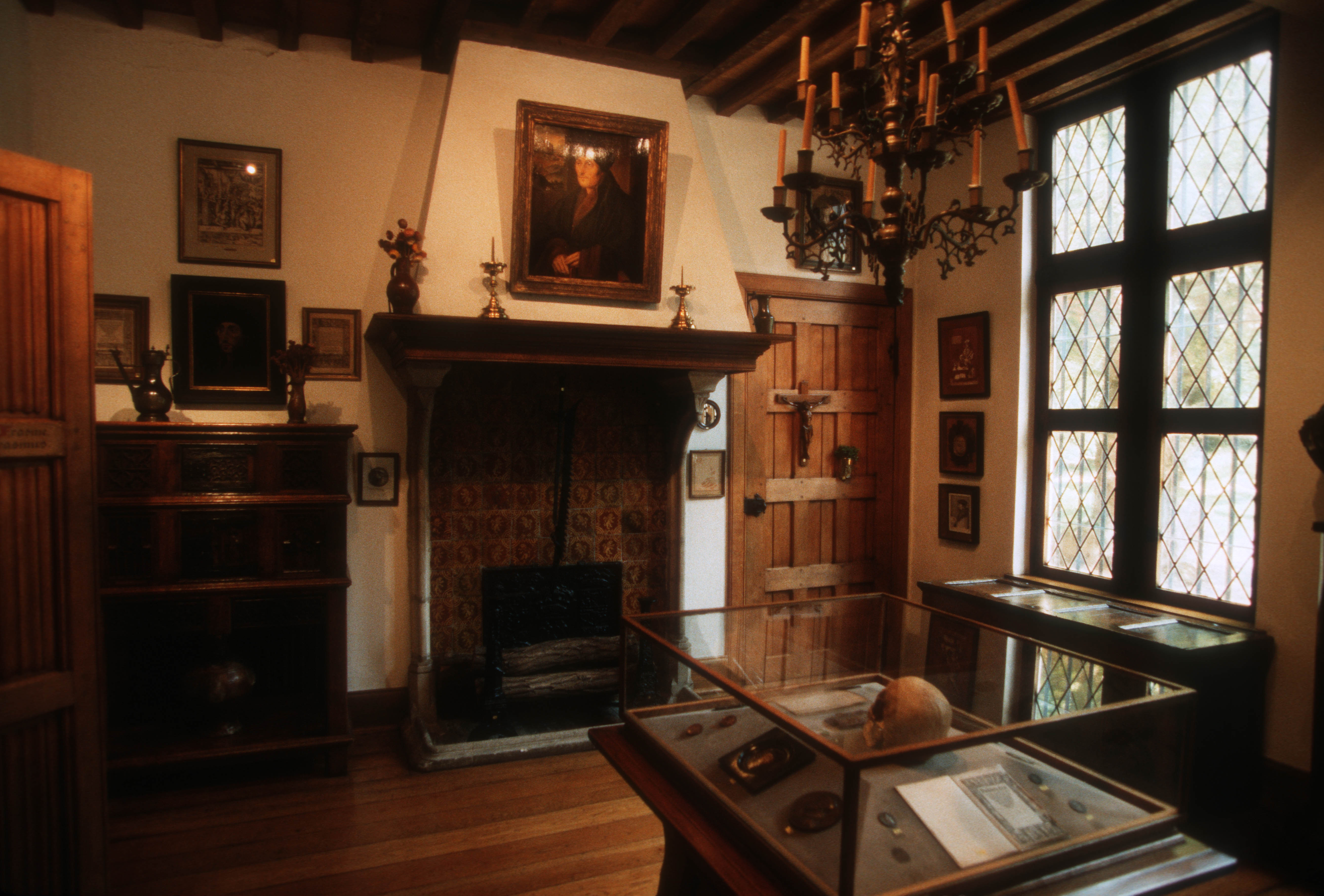
Erasmus's work cabinet before refurbishment

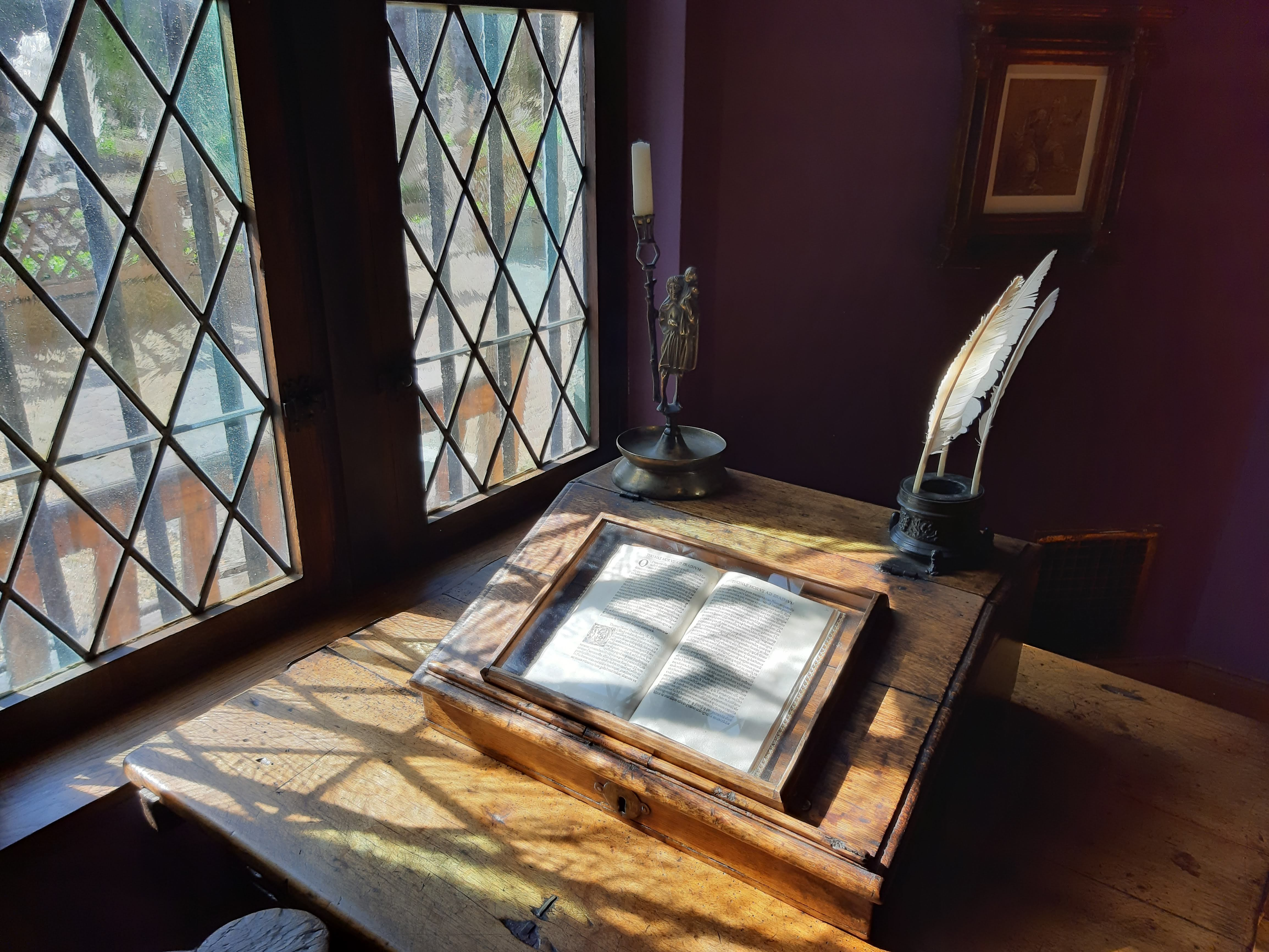
Writing desk

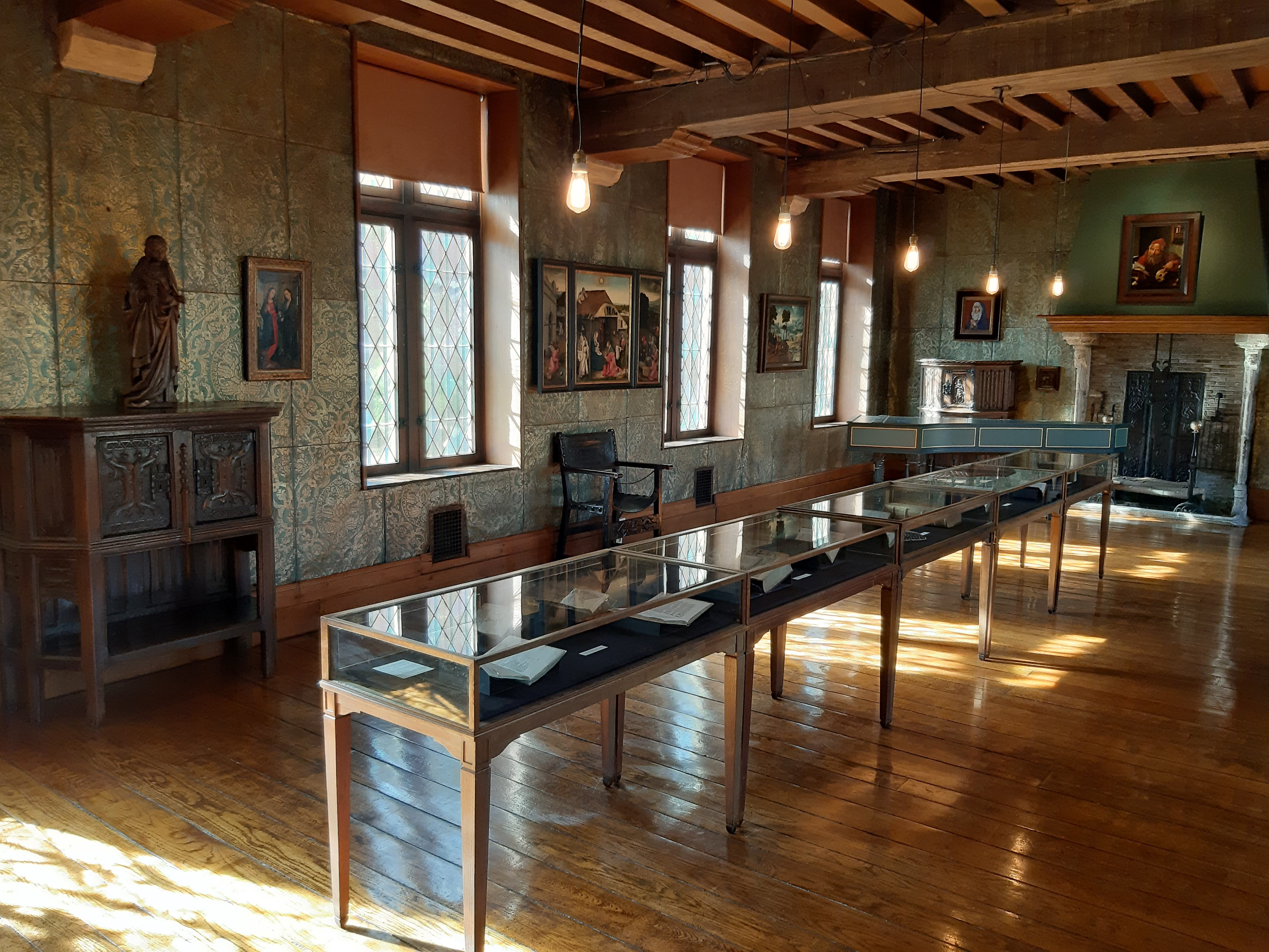
Renaissance Room

== Gardens ==
The gardens of the Erasmus House date from different periods. The early 20th-century orchards were converted into a Romantic English-style garden by the architect Charles Van Elst, which hosted the Belgian Outdoor Sculpture Biennials between 1946 and 1966.

=== Medicinal garden ===
In 1987, the landscape designer René Pechère created a garden of medicinal plants. In this geometric garden, inspired by the Renaissance walled garden and encapsulating the humanist's true botanical spirit, around a hundred plants known to 16th-century doctors for their medicinal properties are cultivated.

=== Philosophical garden ===
In 2000, the landscape architect Benoît Fondu created a philosophical garden. This garden is located beyond the medicinal garden and is inspired by the conference The religious banquet written by Erasmus after his stay in Anderlecht (1521). A series of cartographic beds have been set up, in which visitors can view the plants and flowers that Erasmus contemplated during his numerous travels. This garden also houses works created by contemporary artists, including Catherine Beaugrand, Marie-Jo Lafontaine, as well as Perejaume and Bob Verschueren. The garden furniture and signage were made by Pierre Portier.

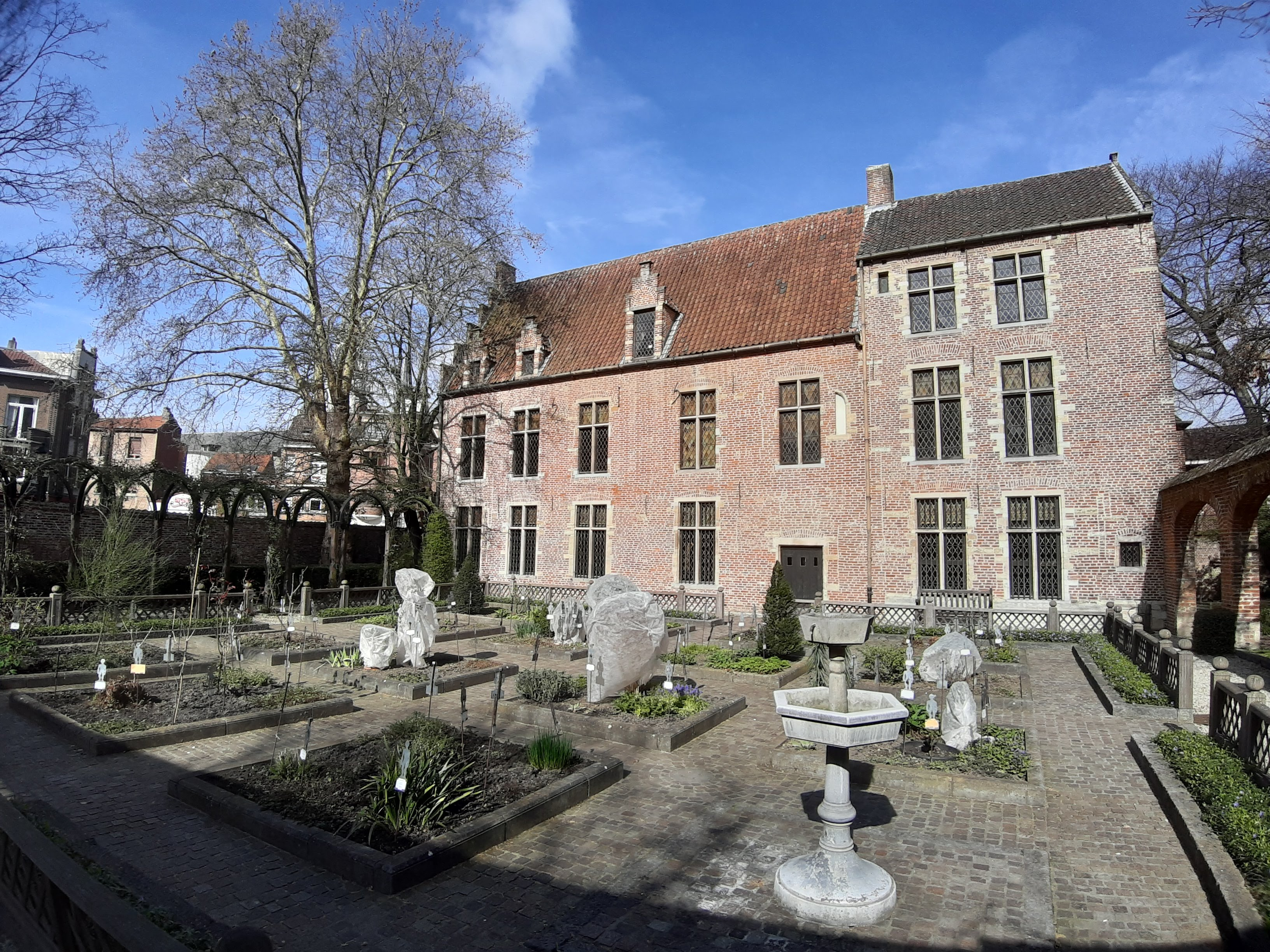
Medicinal garden by René Pechère

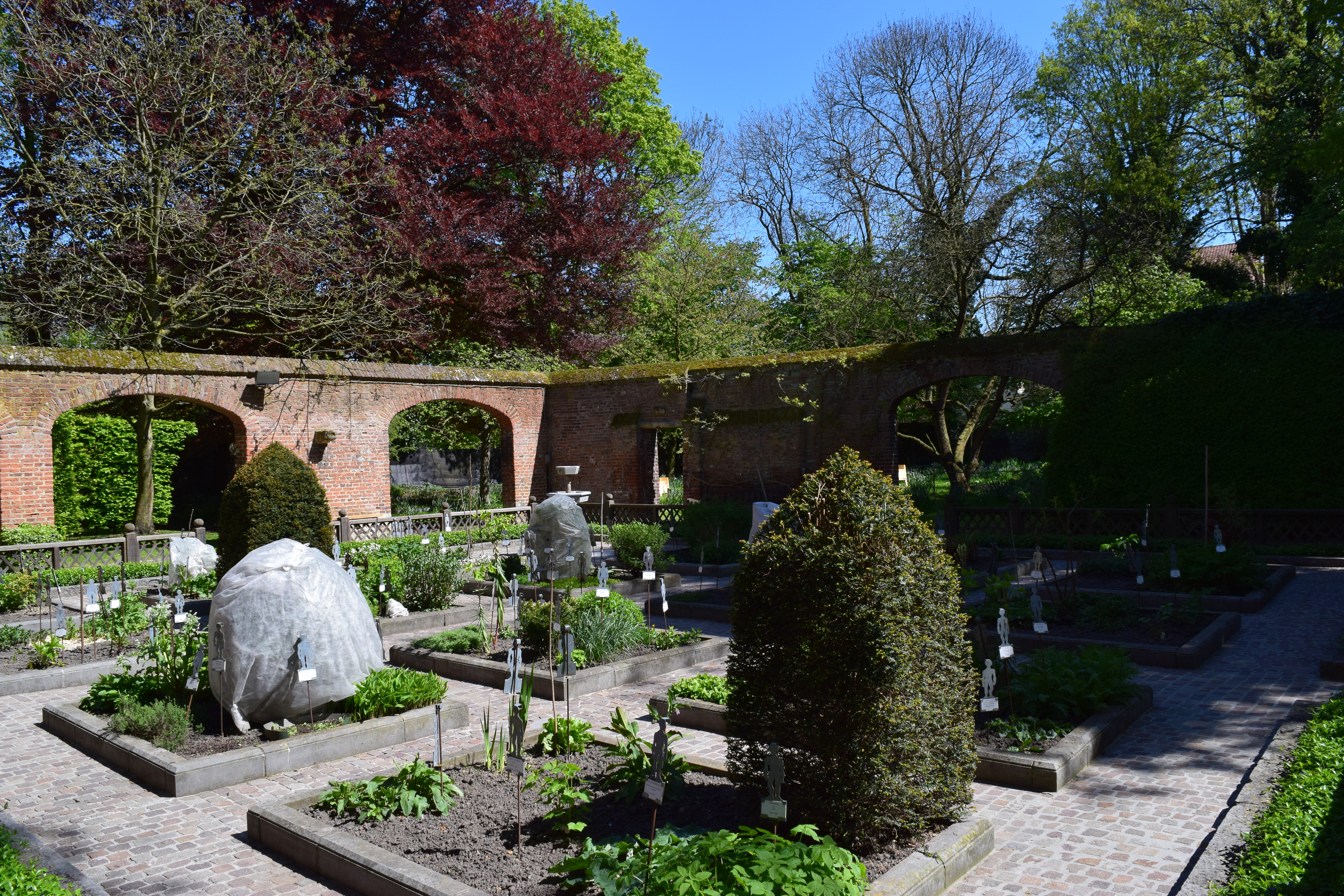
Medicinal garden

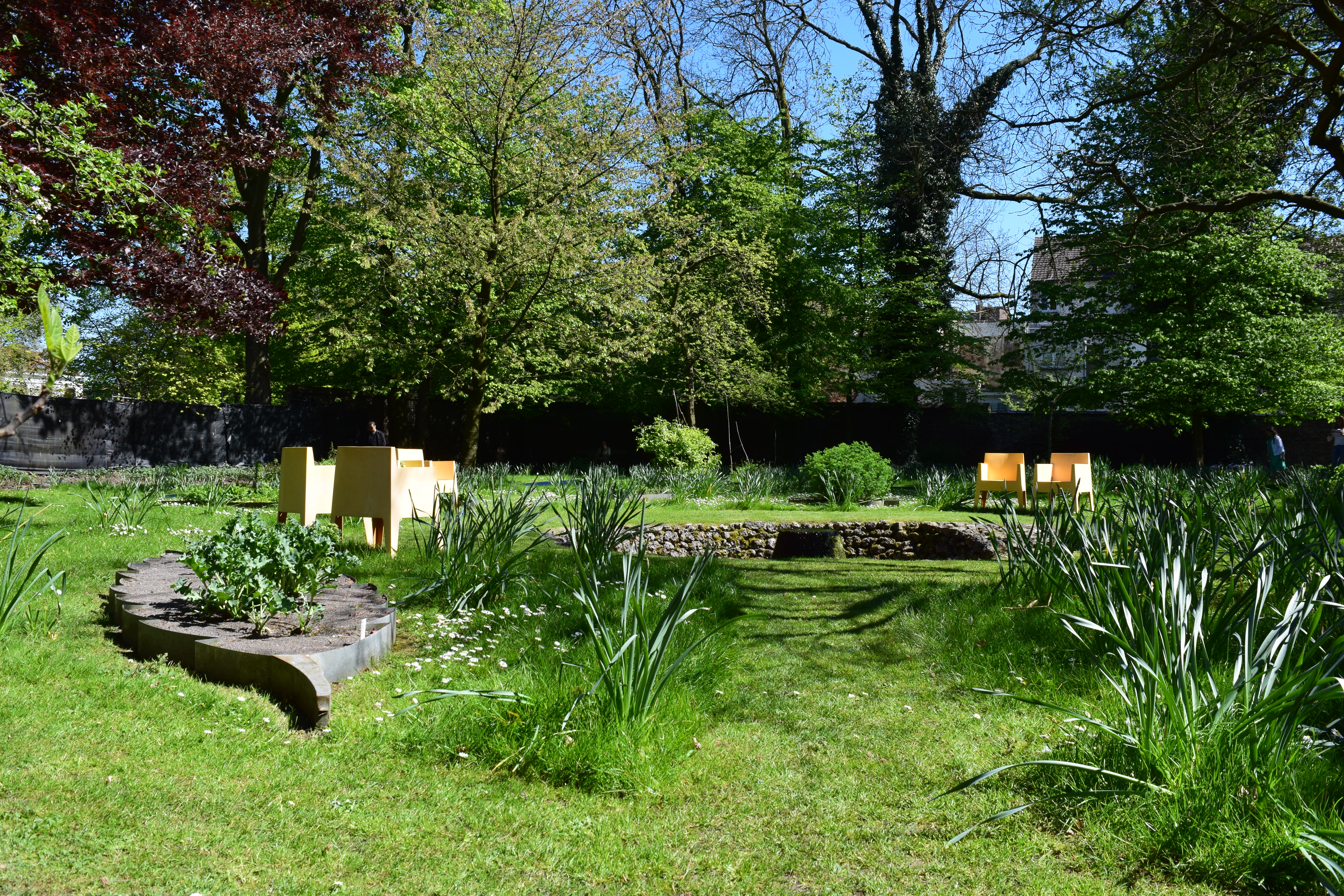
Philosophical garden by Benoît Fondu

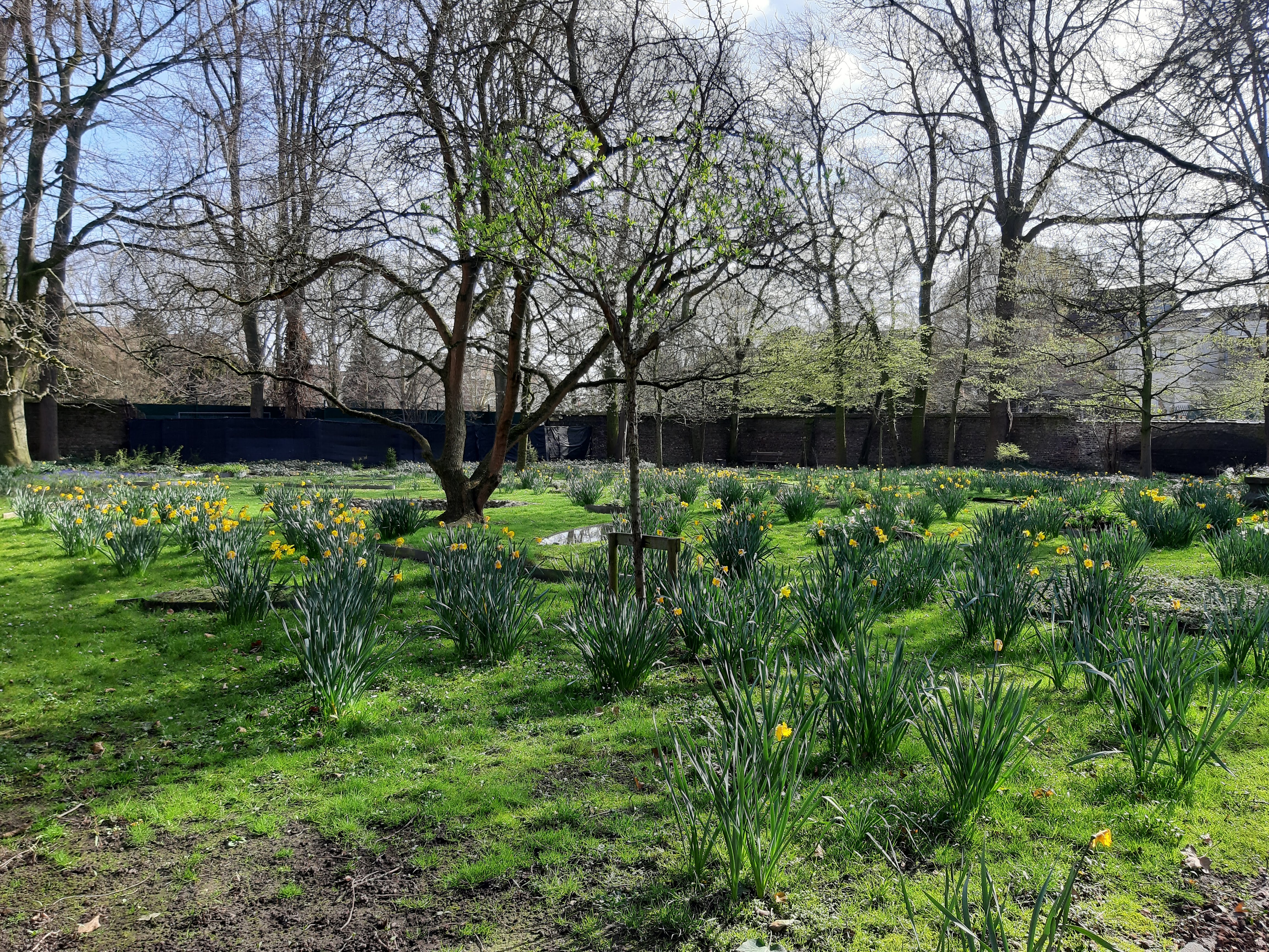
Philosophical garden

== See also ==
- List of museums in Brussels
- History of Brussels
- Culture of Belgium
