= Square de l'Aviation =

Square in Anderlecht, Belgium

Square de l'Aviation (French); Luchtvaartsquare (Dutch)
- The Square de l'Aviation/Luchtvaartsquare in Anderlecht, Brussels

- Location within Brussels Location within Belgium
- Type: Square
- Location: Anderlecht, Brussels-Capital Region, Belgium
- Quarter: Cureghem/Kuregem
- Postal code: 1070
- Nearest metro station: 2 6 Gare du Midi/Zuidstation
- Coordinates: 50°50′27″N 04°20′23″E

Construction
- Completion: c. 1909

The Square de l'Aviation (French, pronounced [skwaʁ d(ə) la.vi.a.sjɔ̃]) or Luchtvaartsquare (Dutch, pronounced [ˈlʏxtfaːrtˌskwɛːr]), meaning "Aviation Square", is a square in the Anderlecht municipality of Brussels, Belgium. The Study and Documentation Centre for War and Contemporary Society (Cegesoma or CegeSoma) is located on this square.

The Square de l'Aviation is bounded to the east by the Boulevard Poincaré/Poincarélaan and extended, to the west, by the Rue Lambert Crickx/Lambert Crickxstraat on the odd side and the Rue de l'Autonomie/Zelfbestuursstraat on the even side. The angle of the two streets forms a cutaway. This area is served by Brussels-South railway station.

== History ==
The Square de l'Aviation was created by virtue of a royal decree issued on 19 October 1909, on the site of the former Royal School of Veterinary Medicine (now moved to Liège). The school's former site, relocated to the Rue des Vétérinaires/Veeartsenstraat, was acquired in 1892 by the municipality of Anderlecht, which drew up development plans for it from 1895. These plans consisted of a square open to the Small Ring (Brussels' inner ring road), from which two 18-metre-wide (59 ft) diagonal streets began, creating a triangular island with the Rue Limnander/Limnanderstraat.

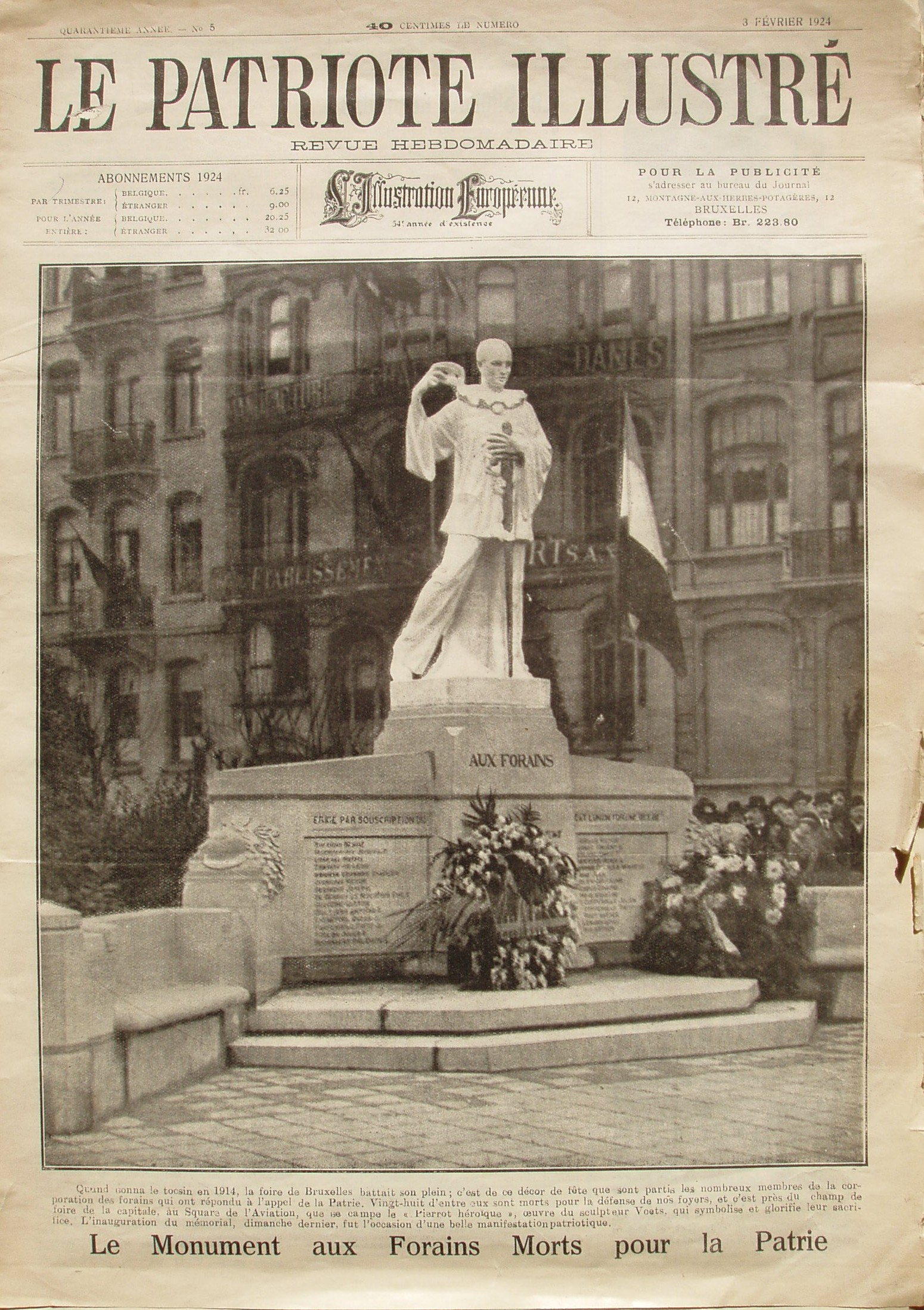
The Monument to the Showmen on the Square de l'Aviation in 1924, cover of Le Patriote illustré

Prizes were planned for the most beautiful façades that would be erected within six years on land sold by the municipality in the district of the former Veterinary School. In practice, however, only part of the plots were built before the First World War. The new arteries were lined with tall and often wide buildings, mostly housing shops on the ground floor and housing on the upper floors. Now called Le Triangle, the district is largely occupied by companies active in the clothing industry.

The square consists of four to six-storey buildings. The first ones were designed, between 1910 and 1913, in eclectic and Beaux-Arts styles. In 1911, the La Prévoyance Sociale building was established in the axis of the square. In the 1920s, the plots that had remained untouched were filled with buildings most often in the Beaux-Arts style tinged with Art Deco. Several buildings were converted into a hotel in the 2000s.

From the outset, the square was embellished with a triangular parterre on the boulevard's side, which in 1924 welcomed the Monument to the Showmen who died for the Fatherland. In 2005–06, the space was redesigned as a pedestrian area, with the exception of the western end, where a carriageway connects the Rue Lambert Crickx and the Rue de l'Autonomie. The narrow part of the square now houses a fountain.

== Notable buildings ==
The Square de l'Aviation is home to an important architectural heritage:

- La Prévoyance Sociale (1912–1927), original Art Nouveau office building by Richard Pringiers, modernist extension and interior redesign (1931–32) by Fernand Brunfaut and Maxime Brunfaut. It is now home to the Study and Documentation Centre for War and Contemporary Society (Cegesoma or CegeSoma), a historical research institute and archive focussing on the Second World War and the contemporary history of Belgium
- the Monument to the Showmen who died for the Fatherland (1924) by Victor Voets and Herman Voets, initially commemorating the 28 showmen who died for Belgium during WW1, to which the names of thirty new victims were added after WW2. In 2003, the monument, in poor condition, was restored and the white marble statue replaced by a copy. The restored original is now in the Municipal Hall.
- No. 23–27: Hotel resulting from the transformation, in the 2000s, of two buildings erected in 1913: a Beaux-Arts style house designed (no. 23) and an eclectic apartment building with Art Nouveau accents (no. 25–27)
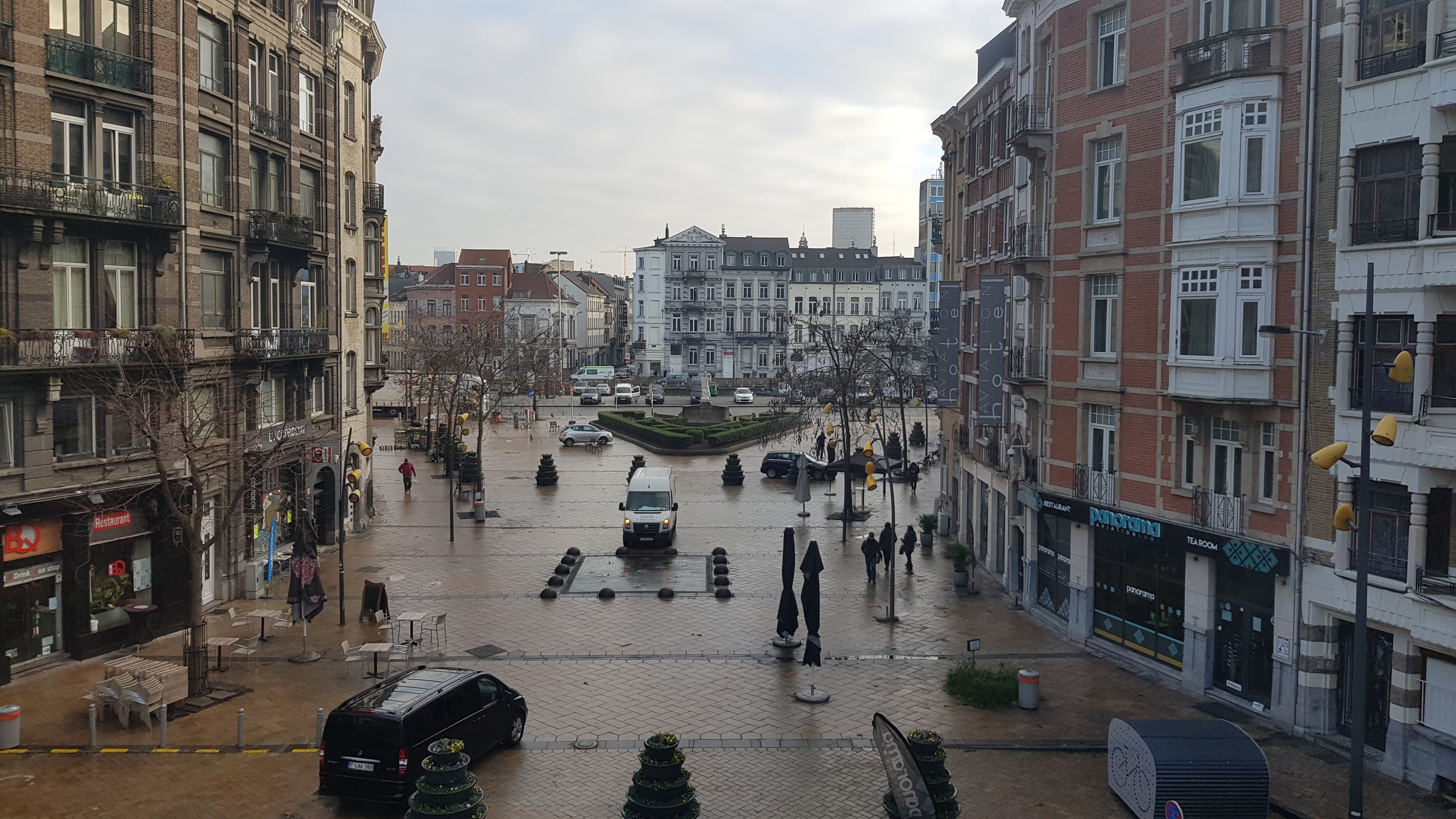
The Square de l'Aviation in 2017, following pedestrianisation

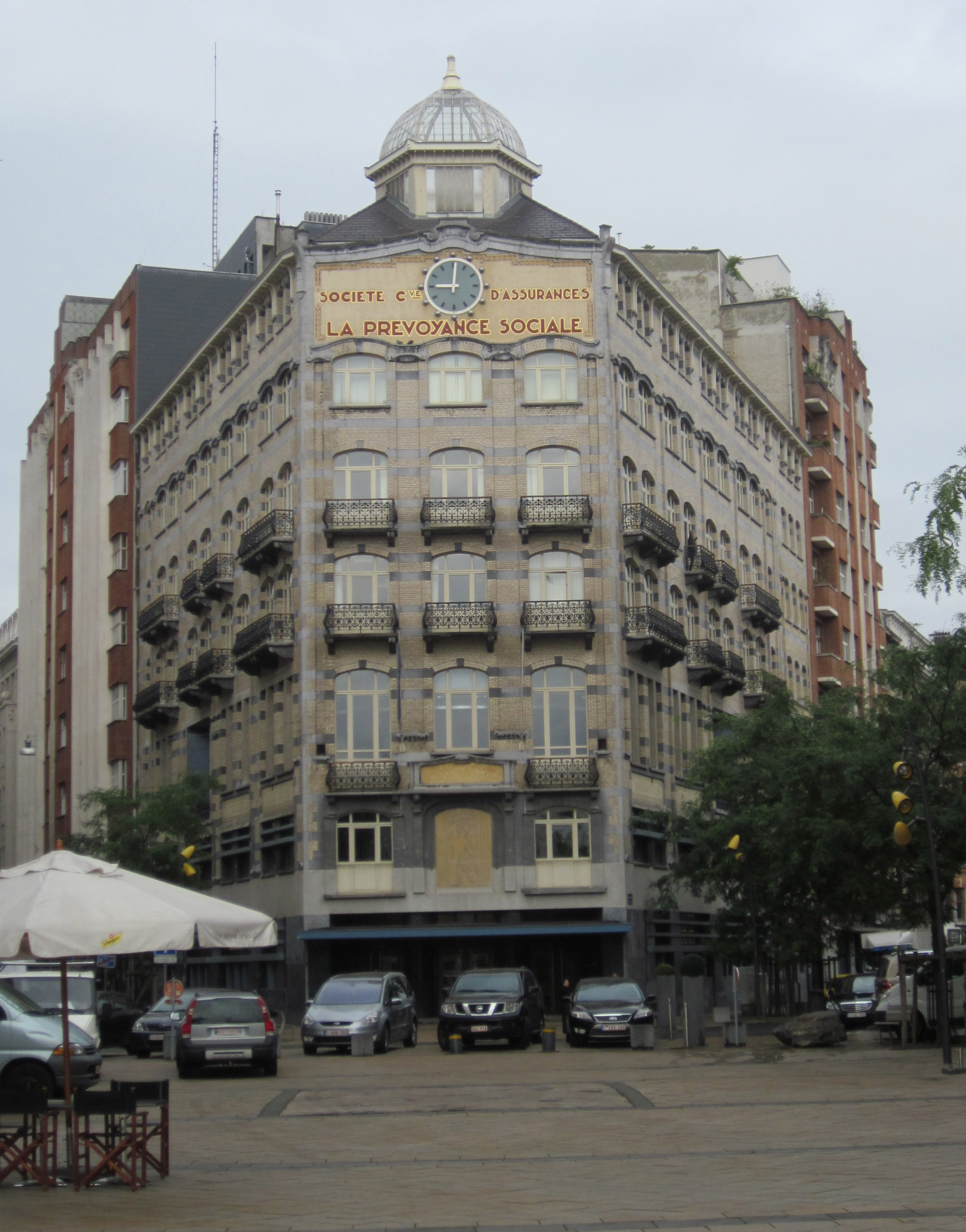
La Prévoyance Sociale building (Pringiers, 1912–1927 and Brunfaut, 1931–32)

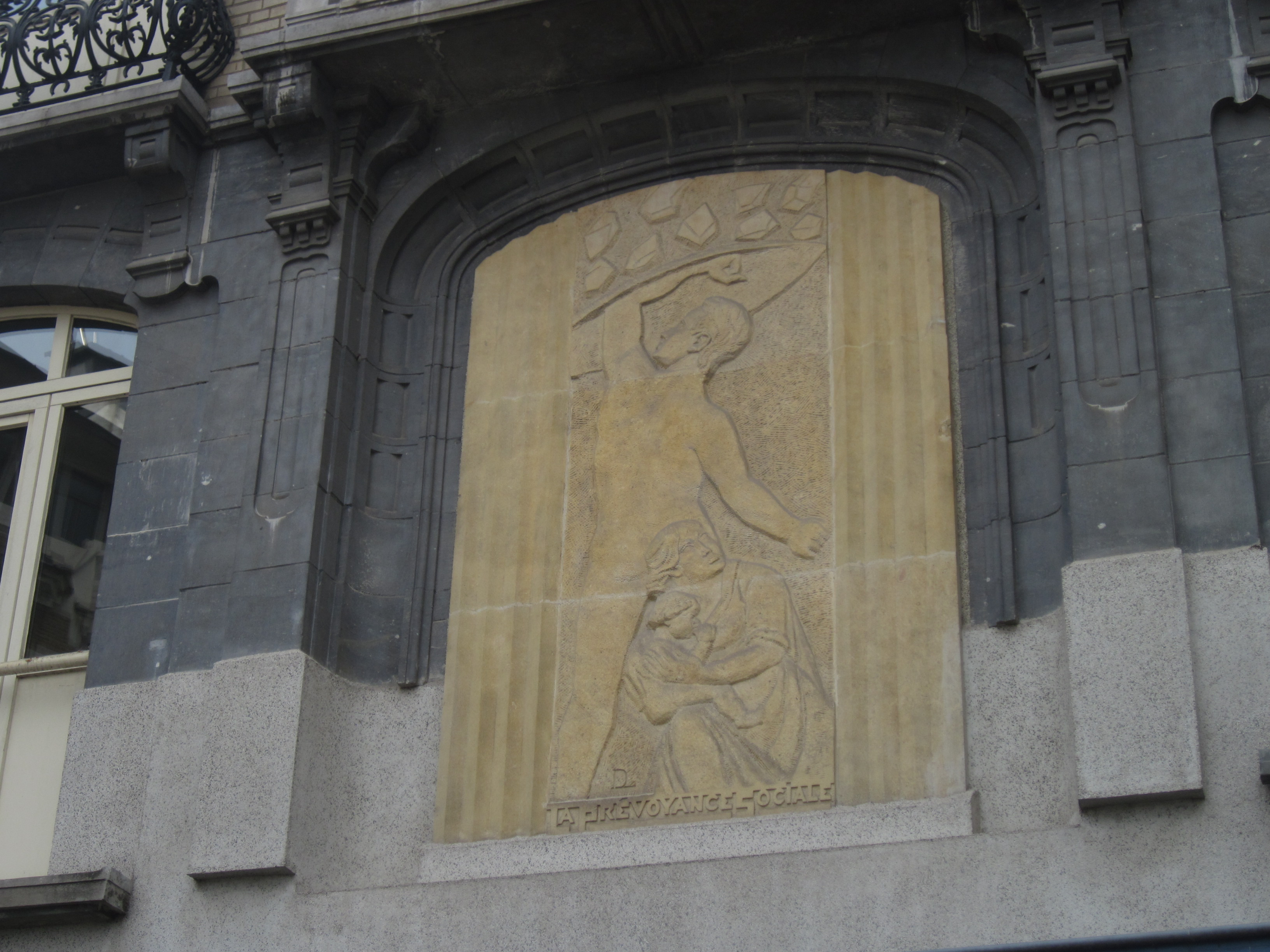
Detail of the La Prévoyance Sociale building

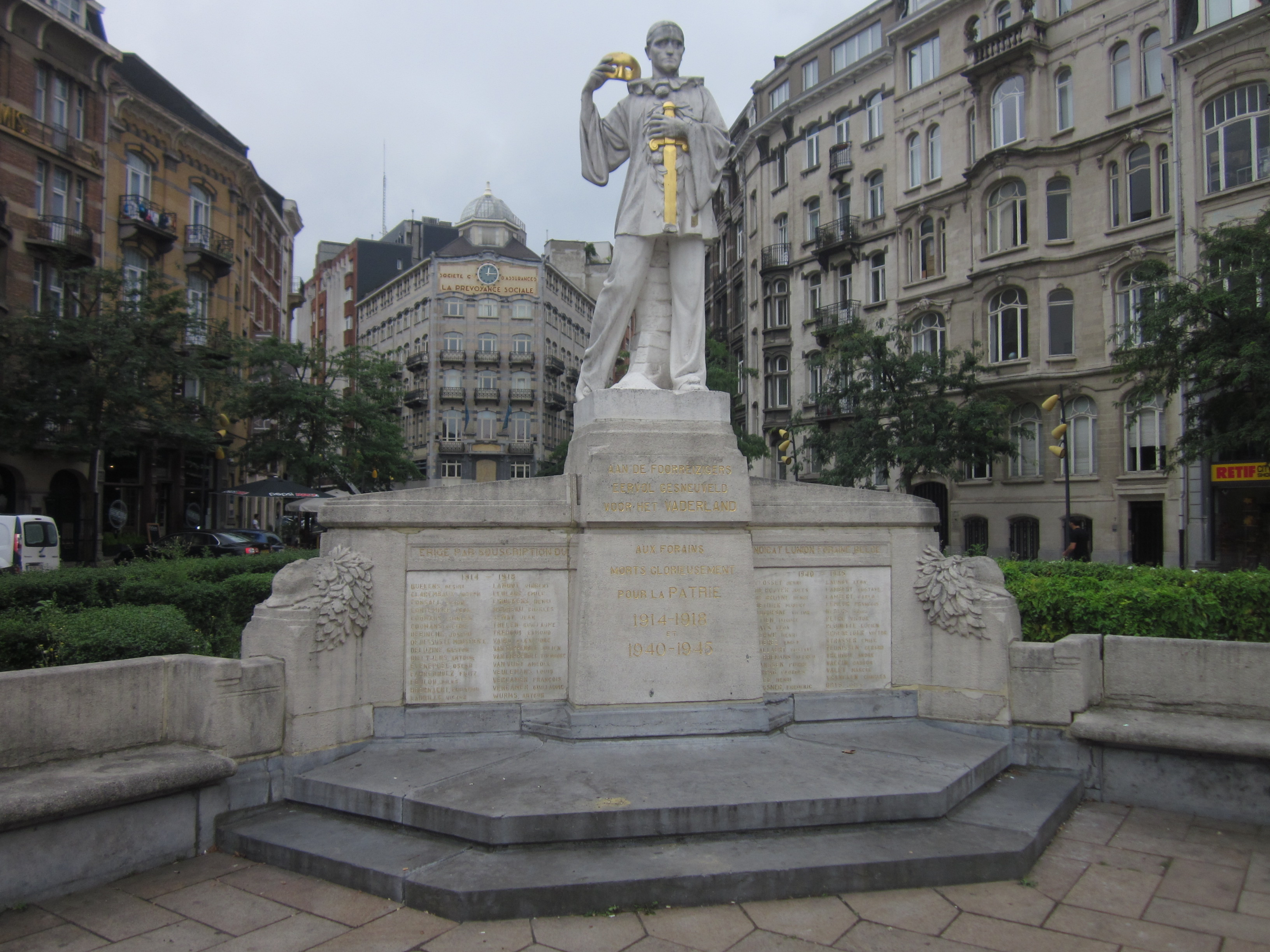
Monument to the Showmen who died for the Fatherland (Voets, 1924)

== See also ==
- Art Nouveau in Brussels
- Art Deco in Brussels
- History of Brussels
- Belgium in the long nineteenth century
