= Cureghem =

Neighbourhood in Brussels, Belgium

Cureghem: Cureghem (French); Kuregem (Dutch)
- Neighbourhood
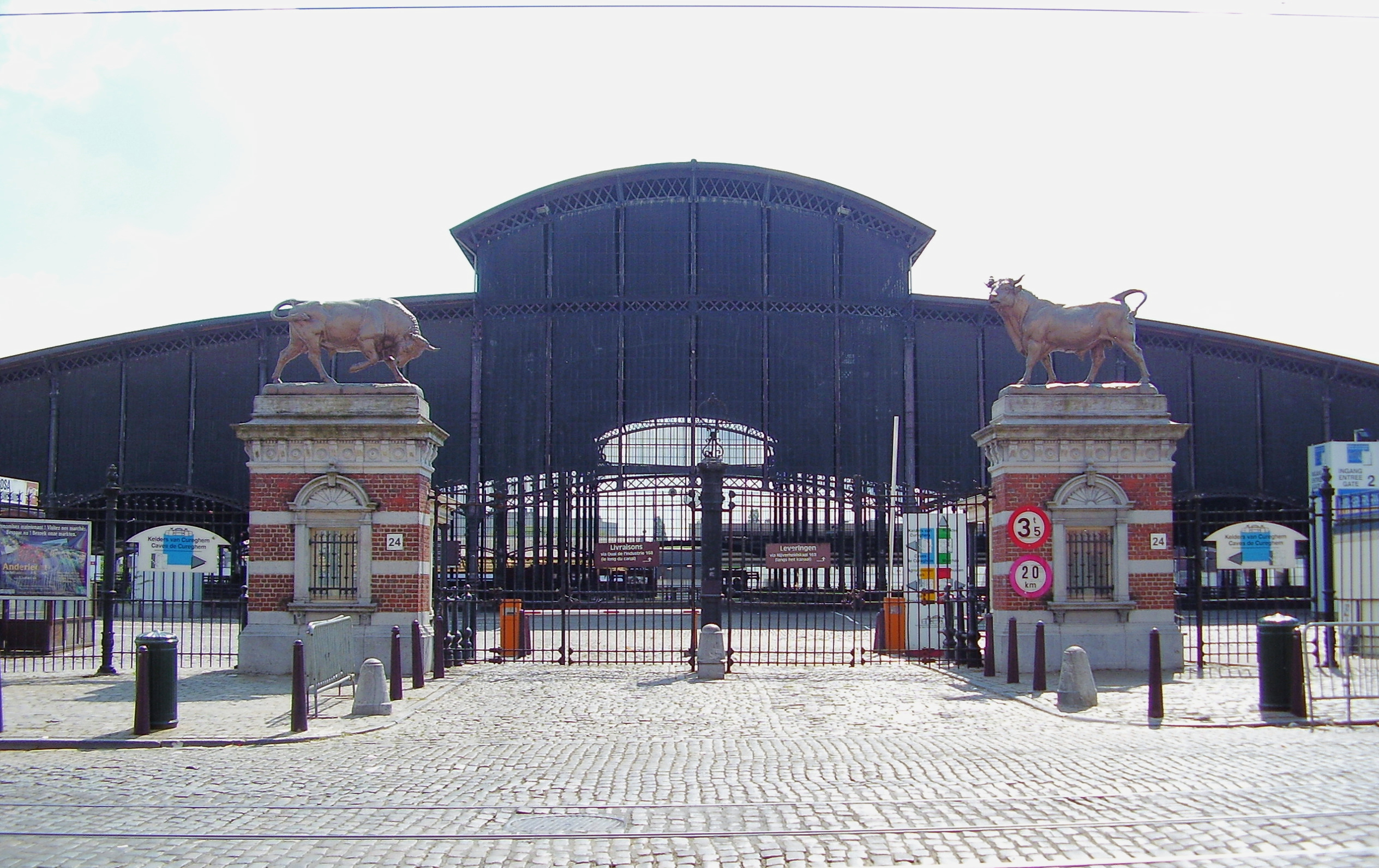
- Entrance and Great Hall of the Abattoirs of Anderlecht (main slaughterhouse in Brussels)

- Location within Brussels Cureghem (Belgium)
- Coordinates: 50°50′12″N 4°19′44″E
- Country: Belgium
- Region: Brussels-Capital Region
- Arrondissement: Brussels-Capital
- Municipality: Anderlecht; Molenbeek-Saint-Jean; Saint-Gilles
- Time zone: UTC+1 (CET)
  - Summer (DST): UTC+2 (CEST)
- Postal code: 1060, 1070, 1080
- Area codes: 02

Cureghem (French, pronounced [kyʁəɡɛm]) or Kuregem (Dutch, pronounced [ˈkyrəɣɛm]) is a district of Brussels, Belgium, located just south-west of the Pentagon (Brussels' city centre). Covering 2 km^{2} (0.77 sq mi) and with a population of 22,741 inhabitants on 1 January 2009, it is one of the region's largest and most populated districts.

Cureghem roughly covers the area between the Quai de l'Industrie/Nijverheidskaai, railways along Brussels-South railway station and the south-western side of the Small Ring (Brussels' inner ring road). The territory is thus split between the municipalities of Anderlecht, Molenbeek-Saint-Jean and Saint-Gilles.

The area developed during the Industrial Revolution along the Brussels–Charleroi Canal and is currently in a fragile social and economic situation due to the decline of its economy and the poor quality of some of its housing.

== History ==
=== Rural beginnings ===
Cureghem was originally a hamlet dependent on Anderlecht on the banks of the river Senne, with a few mills, cottages, inns and a chapel called den Noodt-Godts. The name Cureghem dates from the beginning of the 12th century (1130); it is of Germanic (Frankish) origin and is composed of Curo + -inga + heim, meaning "residence/domain of the family of Curo".

On 9 August 1793, an explosion of gunpowder-laden carts caused widespread destruction in the area. The School of Veterinary Medicine and Rural Economics (French: École vétérinaire et d'économie rurale) moved there in 1836 and changed its name to the Royal Veterinary School of Cureghem (French: École royale de Médecine vétérinaire de Cureghem). It would remain the only veterinary school in the country for over a century.

=== Industrialisation and urbanisation ===
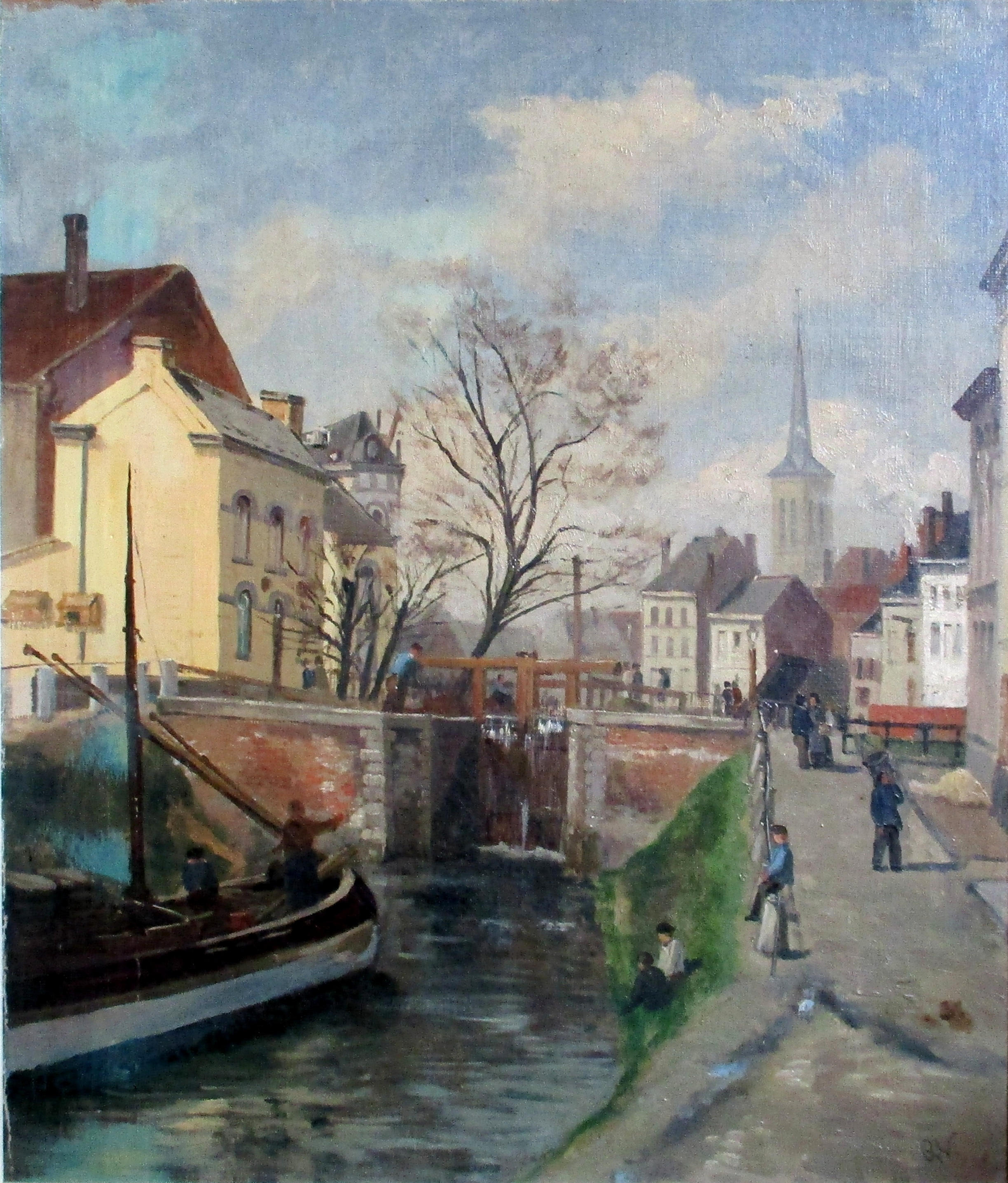
Lock on the Brussels–Charleroi Canal in Cureghem, painting by Gustave Walckiers, c. 1880

Partly due to its favourable location on the Brussels–Charleroi Canal, opened in 1832, the textile industry flourished in the hamlet and many commercial activities were established along the Senne, many of which were linked to brewing and the slaughter of animals. Originally, the main slaughterhouse was that of the City of Brussels, built in 1842 on the site of the current Institute of Arts and Crafts. After various political discussions, it was moved along the Rue Ropsy Chaudron/Ropsy Chaudronstraat. The Abattoirs of Anderlecht were inaugurated in 1890. The tranquil image of large flooded meadows along the Senne that had prevailed until then disappeared forever.

From then on, the district became increasingly prosperous and vibrant. The municipal authorities of Anderlecht decided to develop a dynamic urban planning policy by laying out wide streets lined with bourgeois houses to the west of the Chaussée de Mons/Bergensesteenweg, which had long been the backbone of Cureghem. This was also when the main municipal buildings were constructed, including the most emblematic of all: the current Municipal Hall, completed in 1879. Its location in an expanding district, close to Brussels-South railway station and the Royal Veterinary School, motivated the local councillors.

=== 20th century and later ===
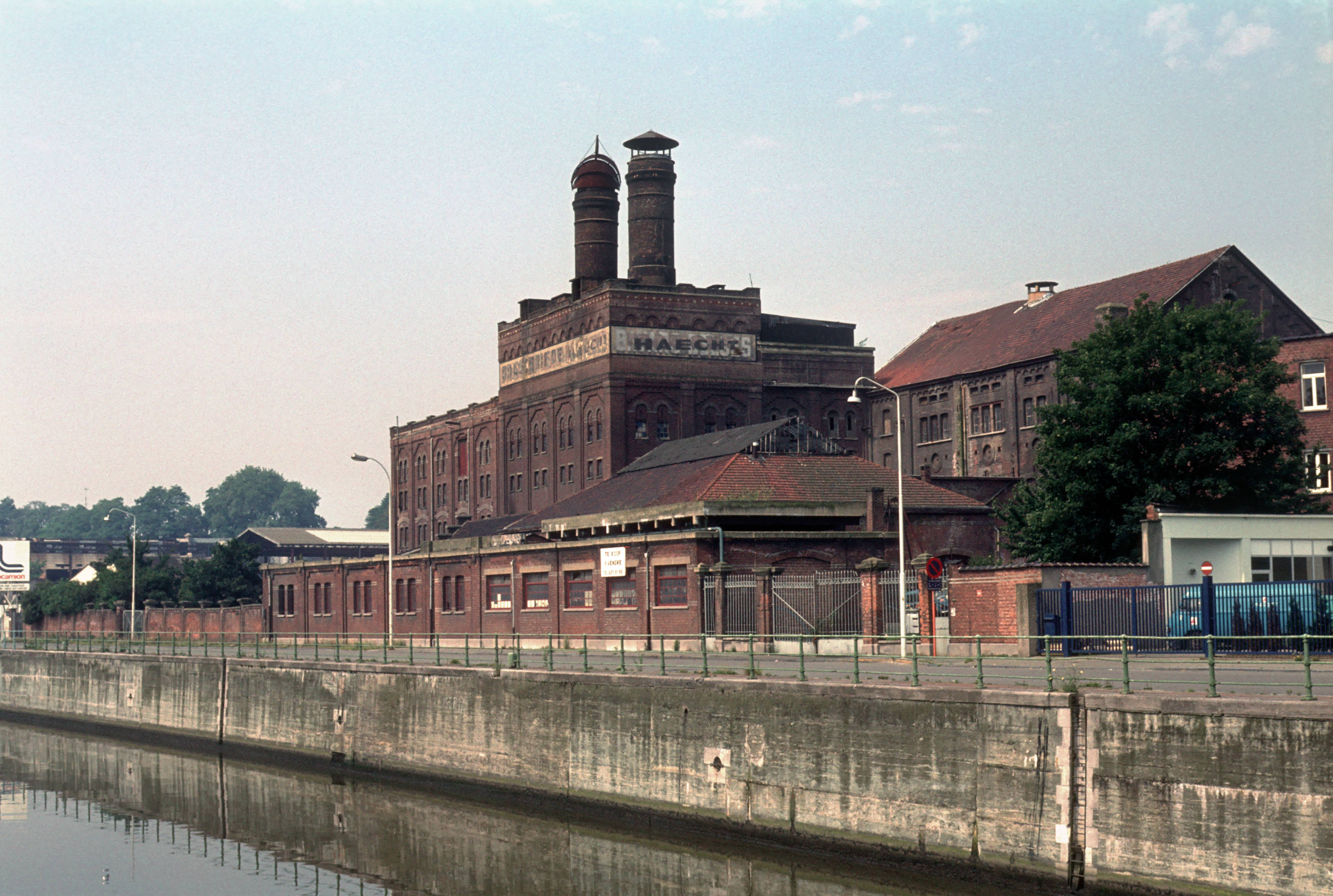
Haecht Brewery along the canal in Cureghem, 1980

Until the early 20th century, Cureghem was a booming suburb which attracted a large working-class population. The industrial decline, however, which had already started before World War I, accelerated after the Great Depression and World War II. Following the industrial decline after the war, the old districts bordering the City of Brussels began to decrease in population. Much of the original Belgian working-class population, when its financial means allowed it, left Cureghem for Brussels' newly developing suburbs. In this lower part of the town, new immigrant populations moved in, leading to the present-day urban fabric.

Where Cureghem was once a centre of intense industrial activity, concentrated around the canal and the railway, most of those industries have disappeared. In some areas, the ensuing poverty left its mark on the urban landscape and scarred the social life of the community, leading to rising crime rates and pervading cultural intolerance. Various local revitalisation programmes are currently under way, aiming at relieving the neighbourhood's most impoverished districts. Attempts at revitalising the neighbourhood have, however, not always been successful (see below).

==== Social unrest ====
On 27 March 1992, riots broke out on and around the Place Alphonse Lemmens/Alfons Lemmensplein in Cureghem. In the hours that followed, the violence spread to Saint-Gilles and Molenbeek-Saint-Jean. Until May, there was regular unrest in Forest, Schaerbeek and Saint-Josse-ten-Noode. On 7 November 1997, more riots erupted in Cureghem after an alleged drug dealer was shot dead by the Gendarmerie. These riots brought the neighbourhood infamy at the time. After that, there were several more clashes between young people and the police. New riots broke out on the weekend of 11–12 April 2020. After a fleeing young man was killed in a collision with a police vehicle, young rioters went on a rampage, ransacking another police vehicle and making off with a service weapon. Shortly afterwards, the municipal council decided to accelerate plans to expand car-free streets.

== Sights ==
- The Municipal Hall of Anderlecht, located on the Place du Conseil/Raadsplein, designed in neo-Flemish Renaissance style by the architect Jules-Jacques Van Ysendyck, which was opened in 1879.
- The Abattoirs of Anderlecht, located at 24, rue Ropsy Chaudron/Ropsy Chaudronstraat, is the main slaughterhouse in Brussels, employing some 1,500 people. In addition to its main activities, the Great Hall serves as a covered market for food and flea markets.
- The Cureghem Cellars (French: Caves de Cureghem, Dutch: Kelders van Kuregem), a subterranean complex of handmade brick caves with vaults, pillars, and arches, originally the site of a cattle market covered by a forged iron roof in the 1890s. The cellars were simply a foundation for the upper structure until the 1930s, when the city council decided to make better use of them. It proved more profitable to grow mushrooms in the dark and damp underground spaces for local consumption. It fell into disuse as a cattle market but, in 1984, the hall was officially listed as a Belgian monument. Due to its characteristic architecture and unique layout, it was refurbished and transformed by a private company, Abattoir SA. Since 1992, it has served as an event site. One of these was the anatomic exposition Body Worlds (German: Körperwelten) by Gunther Von Hagens, which ran in the cellars between 2008 and 2009 and attracted over 500,000 visitors.
- The Synagogue of Anderlecht, an Orthodox synagogue designed in Art Deco style by the architect Joseph de Lange and completed in 1933.
- The National Memorial to the Jewish Martyrs of Belgium, a monument commemorating the 24,600 Belgian Jewish martyrs of World War II, designed by the architects André Godart and Odon Dupire, and completed in 1970. It is located in the centre of the Square des Martyrs Juifs/Joodse-Martelarensquare, which was created for the occasion.
- The National Museum of the Resistance, which traces the history of the Belgian Resistance and German occupation of Belgium during World War II.
- Between 1836 and 1991, the district housed the Royal School of Veterinary Medicine, now moved to Liège but often still referred to as Cureghem. The old campus, listed as protected heritage, has undergone a large rehabilitation process.
- In its lower part, bordering the City of Brussels, are the Square de l'Aviation/Luchtvaartsquare and the Parc de la Rosée/Dauwpark.
- Three listed buildings—the former Atlas Brewery, the old power station, and the former Moulart Mill— are testaments to the old industrial activities next to the waterway.
- The Cantillon Brewery, a gueuze museum established in an actual working brewery.
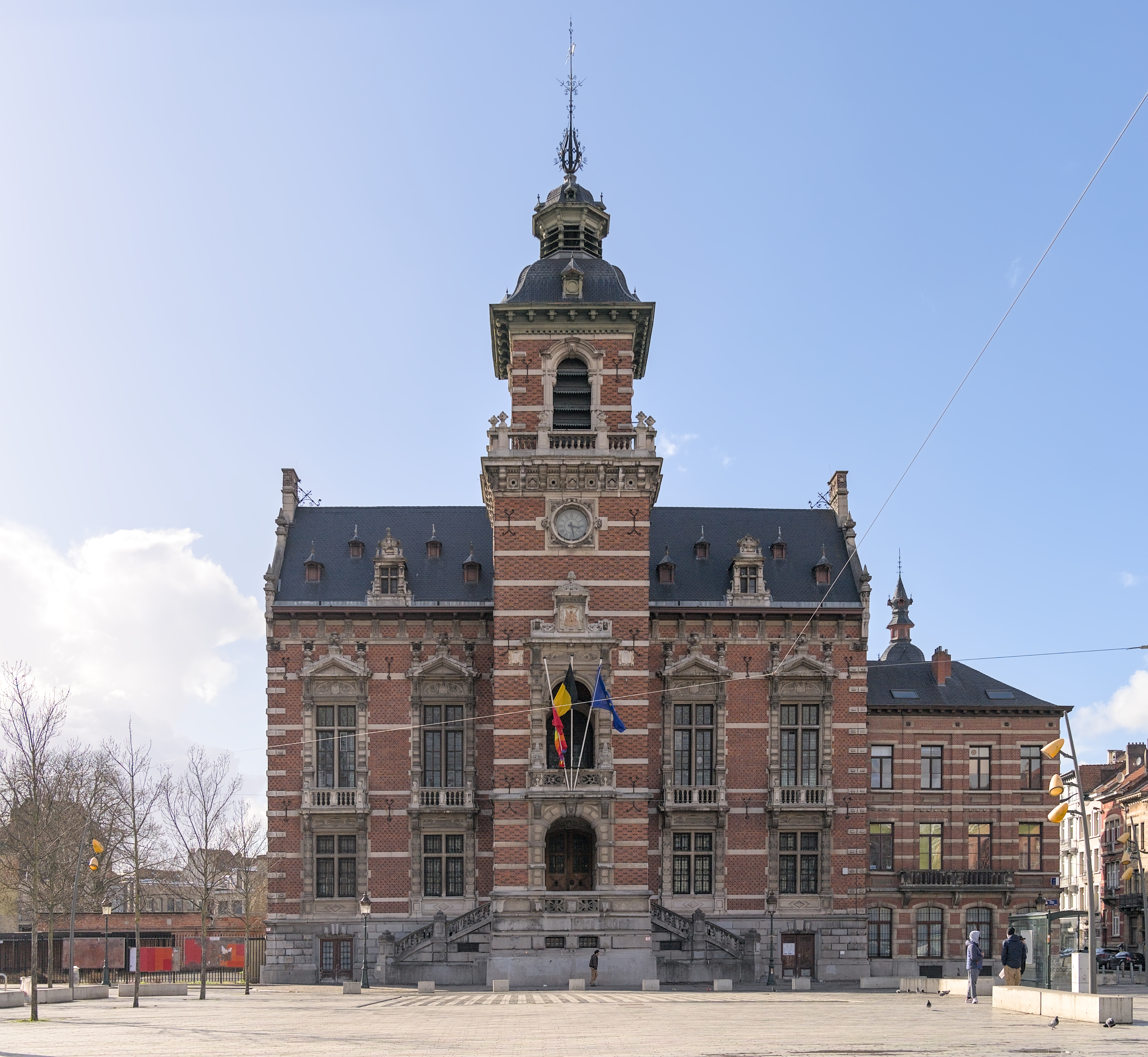
Anderlecht's Municipal Hall seen from the Place du Conseil/Raadsplein

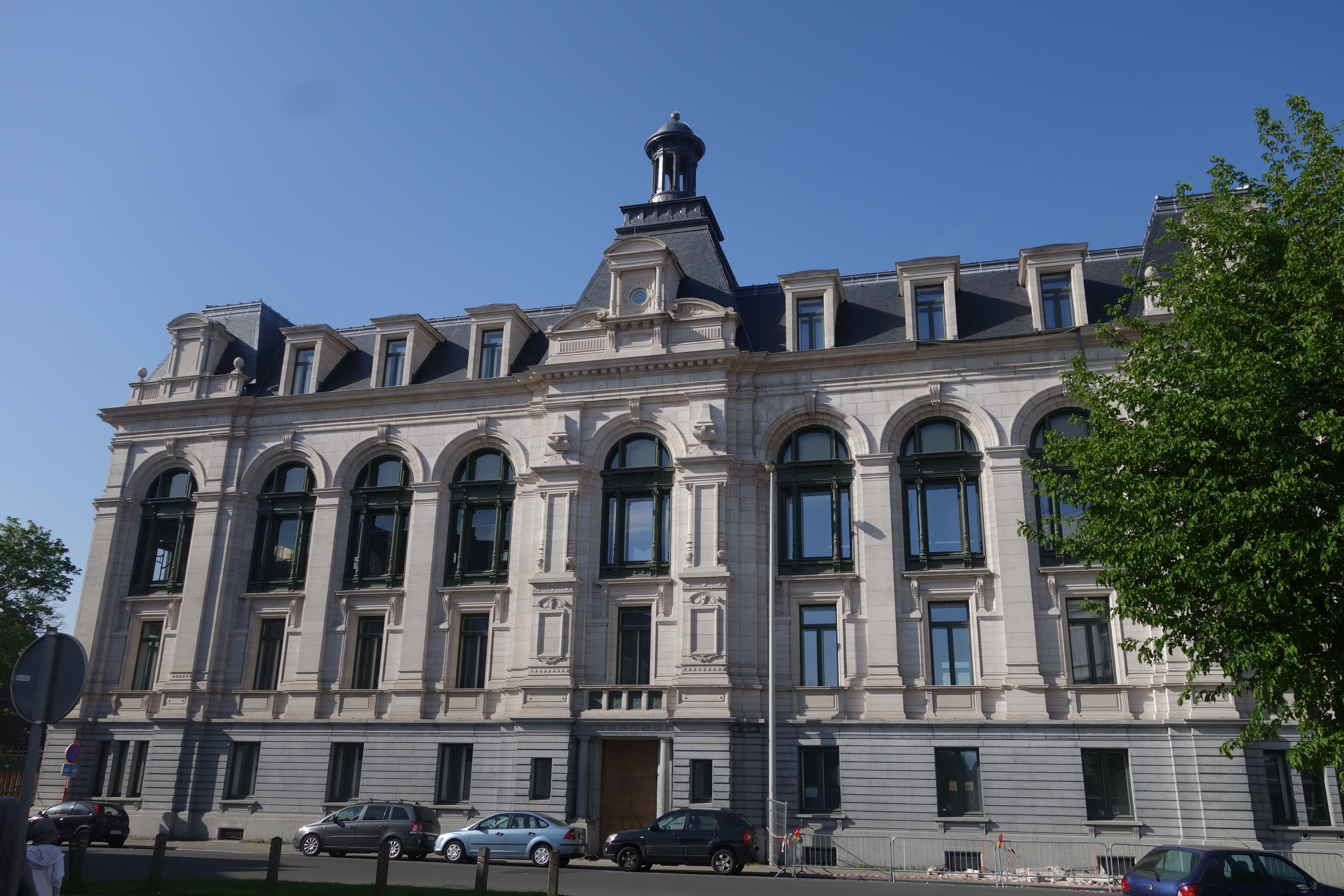
Historic main building of the Royal School of Veterinary Medicine

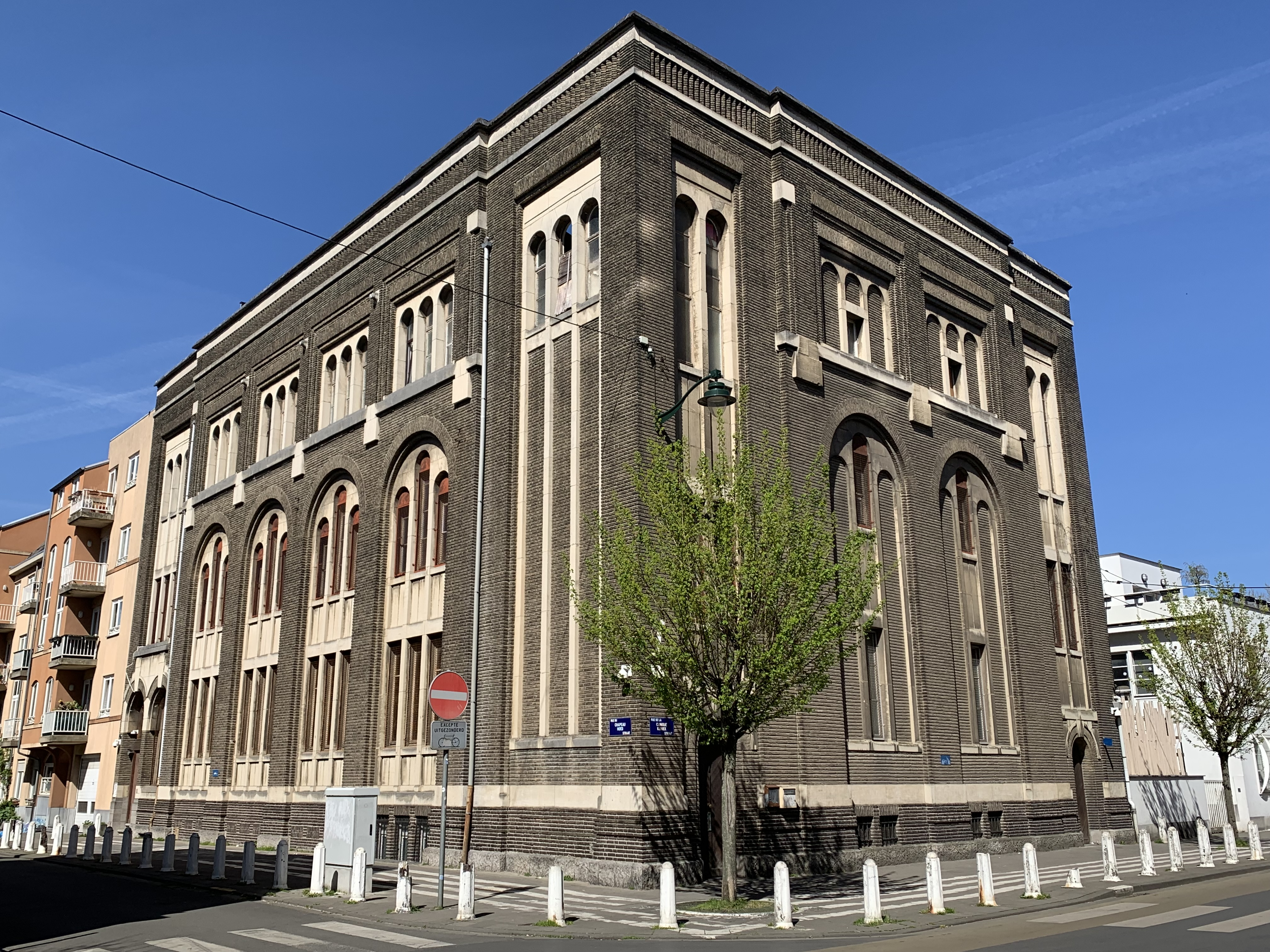
Synagogue of Anderlecht

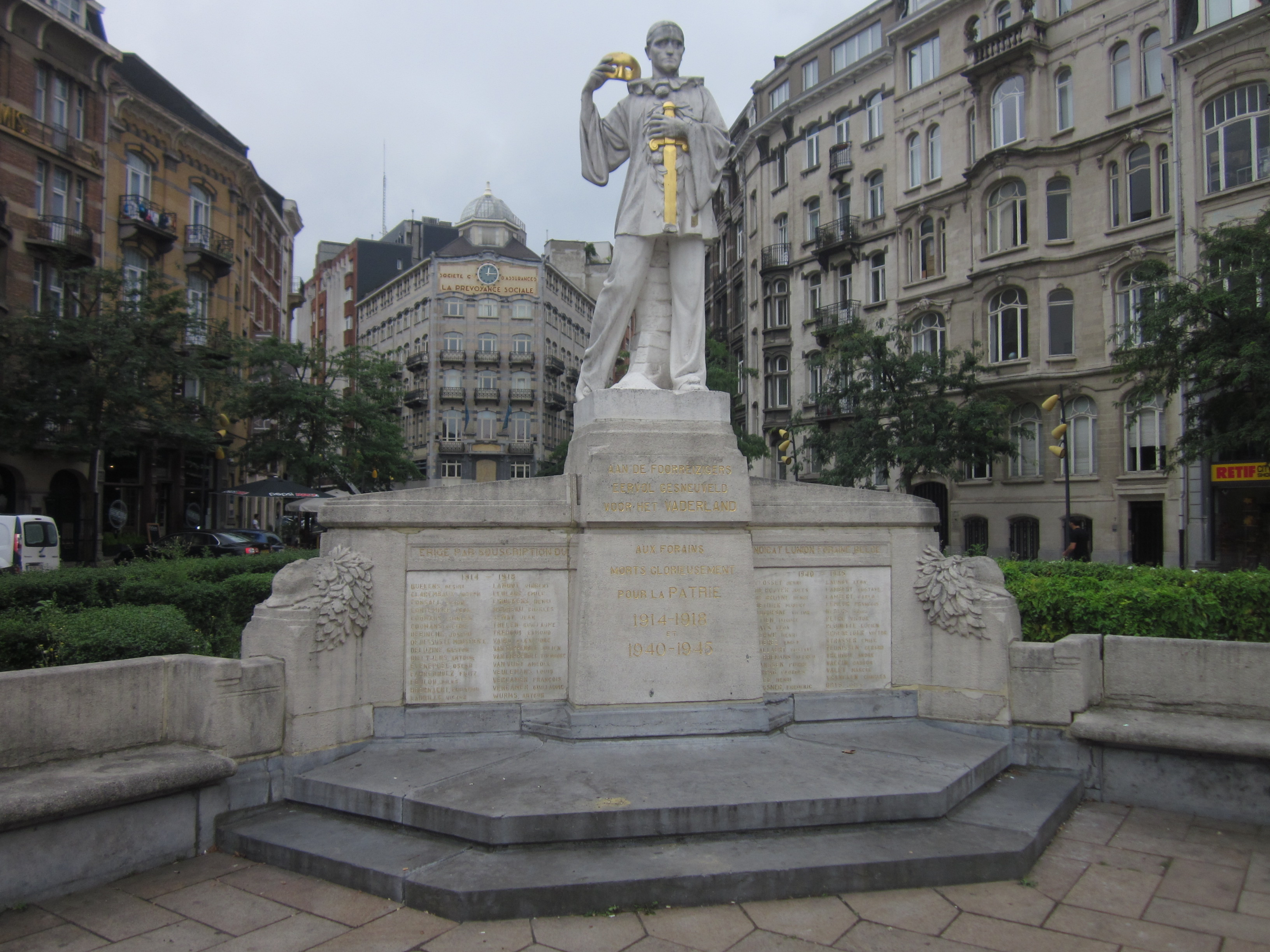
Monument to the Showmen who died for the Fatherland on the Square de l'Aviation/Luchtvaartsquare

== See also ==
- Neighbourhoods in Brussels
- History of Brussels
- Belgium in the long nineteenth century
