= Synagogue of Anderlecht =

Synagogue in Brussels, Belgium

- Synagogue d'Anderlecht (French); Synagoge van Anderlecht (Dutch)
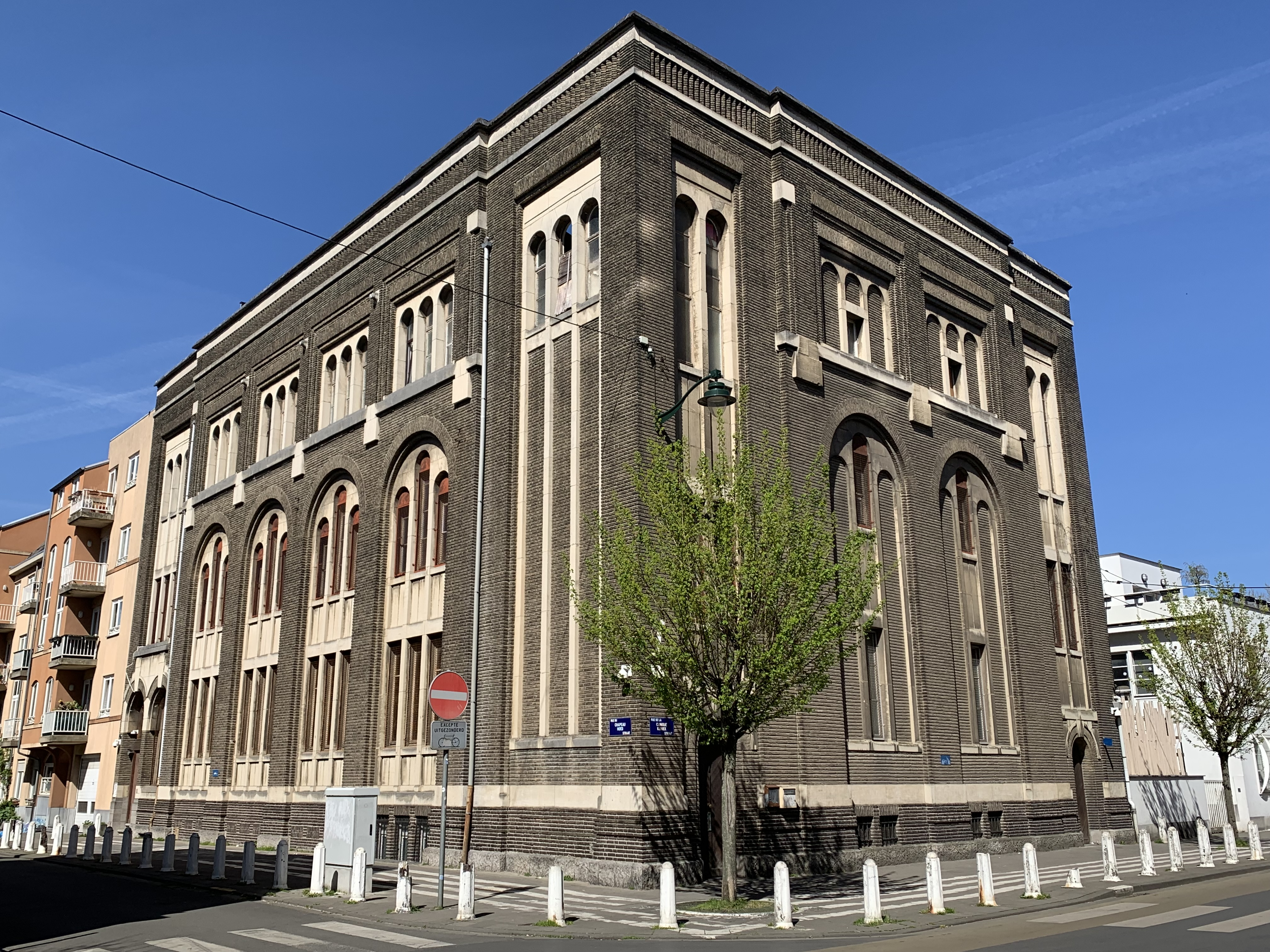

- Location of the synagogue in Brussels

Religion
- Affiliation: Orthodox Judaism
- District: Cureghem/Kuregem
- Ecclesiastical or organisational status: Synagogue
- Status: Active

Location
- Location: Rue de la Clinique / Kliniekstraat 67A; 1070 Anderlecht, Brussels-Capital Region
- Country: Belgium
- Coordinates: 50°50′25″N 4°19′52″E

Architecture
- Architect: Joseph de Lange
- Type: Synagogue architecture
- Style: Art Deco
- Established: 1912 (as a congregation)
- Groundbreaking: 1928
- Completed: 1933

The Synagogue of Anderlecht (French: Synagogue d'Anderlecht; Dutch: Synagoge van Anderlecht), officially the Synagogue of the Orthodox Jewish Community of Brussels, (Note: French: Synagogue de la Communauté israélite orthodoxe de Bruxelles; Dutch: Synagoge van de Joodse Orthodoxe Gemeenschap van Brussel) and also known as the Israelite Orthodox Synagogue of Cureghem, (Note: French: Synagogue orthodoxe israélite de Cureghem; Dutch: Israëlitische Orthodoxe Synagoge van Kuregem) is an Orthodox Jewish synagogue in Brussels, Belgium, and the main synagogue of the Israelite Orthodox Community of Brussels. (Note: French: Communauté Israélite Orthodoxe de Bruxelles (CIOB); Dutch: Joodse Orthodoxe Gemeenschap van Brussel)

The synagogue is located in the heart of the former Jewish quarter of Cureghem/Kuregem, at 67A, rue de la Clinique/Kliniekstraat, in the municipality of Anderlecht.

== History ==
=== Early history ===
From 1910, an Orthodox synagogue had existed in the outskirts of Marolles/Marollen district, in the historic centre of Brussels, but it was quickly replaced by a larger synagogue on the Rue de la Clinique/Kliniekstraat in Anderlecht. The Orthodox community was recognised by royal decree in 1912.

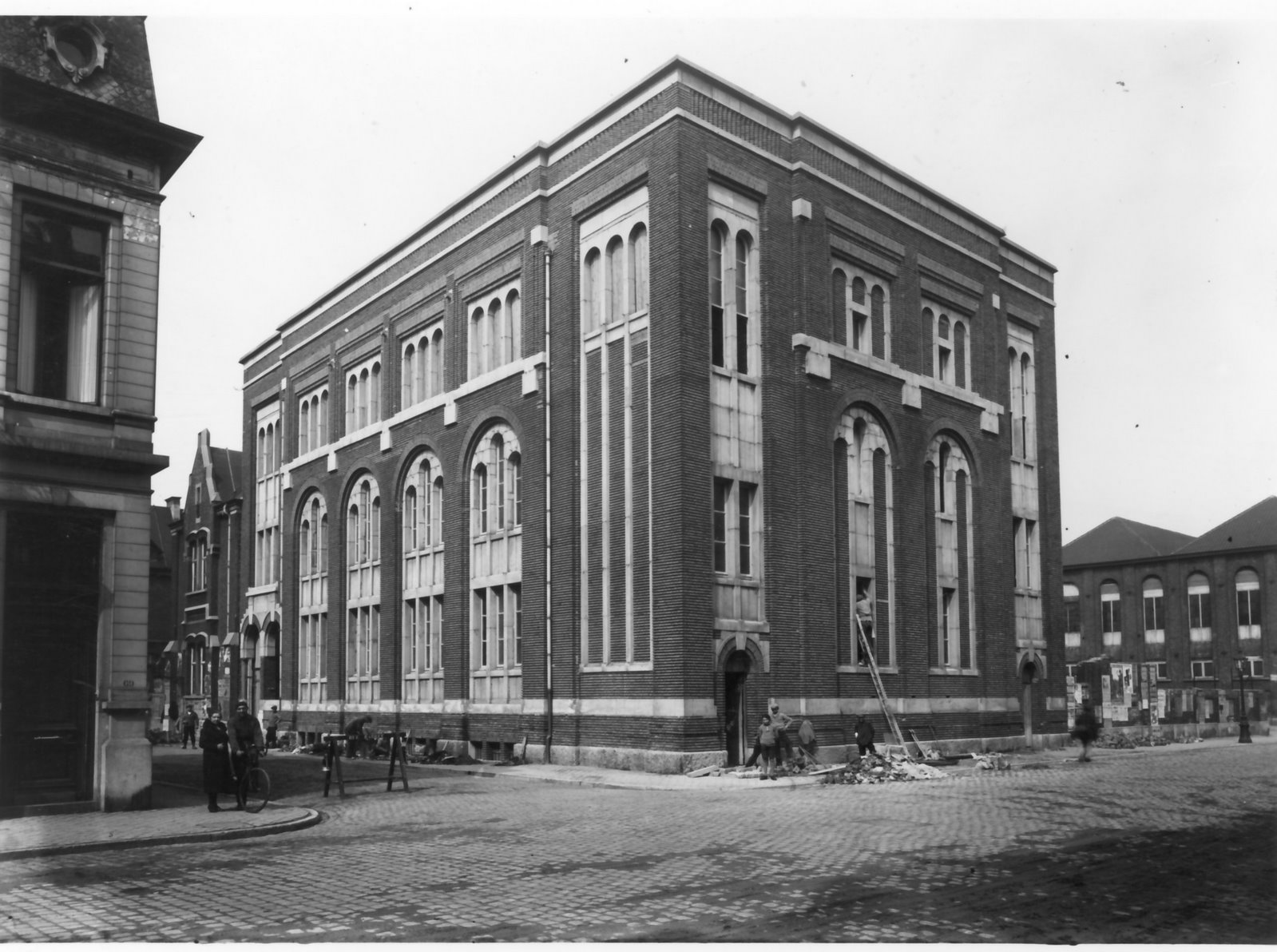
The synagogue in 1935

At the beginning of the 20th century, Anderlecht experienced an influx of Jewish refugees, so construction of a large synagogue was seriously envisaged by the end of 1922. In 1926, the community bought a 500 m^{2} (5,400 sq ft) plot of land and began construction on the building in 1928. Joseph de Lange, a Jewish architect from Antwerp, was put in charge of the project. The community consecrated and inaugurated the synagogue, though it faced a precarious economic and political conditions in Europe. Rabbi Joseph Serfaty, described the synagogue's congregants as follows:

From one end came Ashkenazi Jews from Germany, from the other end were Sephardic Jews from Poland. The latter were much fewer in number and prayed in a small room upstairs.

During this period, the Brussels neighbourhood of Cureghem/Kuregem became the Jewish quarter in the city. Jacob Meir Segalowitsch of Danzig (now Gdańsk, Poland) was the first rabbi until 1940.

=== After the Holocaust ===
After the Holocaust, a commemorative stone was placed at the entrance of the synagogue in honour of the Jews of the Orthodox-Israelite community who were killed. The synagogue's rabbi, Joseph Gelernter, and his family (with the exception of his eldest son) were killed during the war. Rabbi Isaac Steinberg became the rabbi after the war and he refinished the interior of the building. At one point, the building housed the offices of the Orthodox Jewish Community of Brussels, the Kosher Supervisory Commission of Brussels, the Orthodox Rabbinate, the Bet Din, and the Beit Midrash.

In 2010, Joël Rubinfeld said that the synagogue was completely deserted, due to the security issues in the neighbourhood and the migration of the Jews of Anderlecht to other neighbourhoods in Brussels. Albert Guigui, the Chief Rabbi of Brussels, explained that the synagogue is only opened on major Jewish holidays.

==== Antisemitic incidents ====
In 2010, a Molotov cocktail was thrown at the entrance door of the synagogue. In September 2014, the synagogue was the victim of arson. The perpetrator, Mohamed H., was sentenced to six years in prison in December 2017, despite declaring his innocence. In 2017, surveillance cameras at the synagogue were vandalised multiple times.

== See also ==
- The Holocaust in Belgium
- History of the Jews in Belgium
- History of Brussels
