= Abattoirs of Anderlecht =

Historic industrial complex in Brussels, Belgium

- Abattoirs d'Anderlecht (French); Slachthuis van Anderlecht (Dutch)
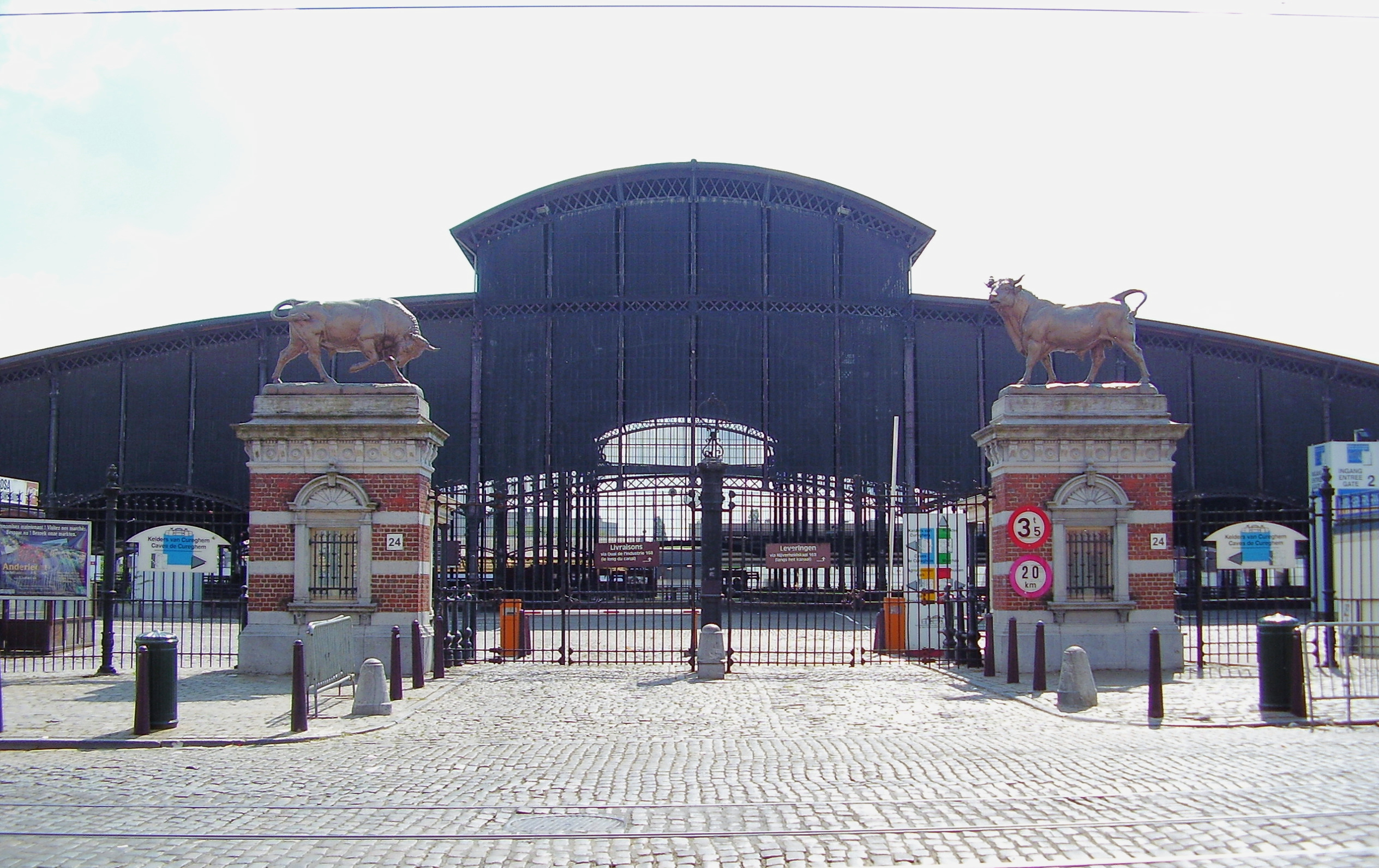
- Entrance seen from the Rue Ropsy Chaudron/Ropsy Chaudronstraat
- Interactive map of the Abattoirs of Anderlecht area
- Alternative names: Abattoirs and Markets of Anderlecht-Cureghem; Abattoirs of Cureghem

General information
- Type: Abattoir
- Architectural style: Industrial; Flemish Renaissance Revival
- Location: Rue Ropsy Chaudron / Ropsy Chaudronstraat 24, 1070 Anderlecht, Brussels-Capital Region, Belgium
- Coordinates: 50°50′33″N 4°19′35″E
- Inaugurated: 24 August 1890
- Renovated: 2009

Design and construction
- Architects: Émile Tirou, Henri Rieck
- Designations: Protected (08/08/1988)

Other information
- Public transit: 2 6 Clemenceau and Delacroix

Website
- www.abattoir.be/en

The Abattoirs of Anderlecht (French: Abattoirs d'Anderlecht; Dutch: Slachthuis van Anderlecht), also known as the Abattoirs and Markets of Anderlecht-Cureghem (Note: French: Abattoirs et Marchés d'Anderlecht-Cureghem; Dutch: Slachthuis en de Markten van Anderlecht-Kuregem) and the Abattoirs of Cureghem (Note: French: Abattoirs de Cureghem; Dutch: Slachthuis van Kuregem), is a large industrial complex in Anderlecht, a municipality of Brussels, Belgium, and the city's main slaughterhouse, employing some 1,500 people.

The buildings, combining industrial and neo-Flemish Renaissance architecture, were originally designed by the architect Émile Tirou in 1889, inaugurated in 1890, and later modified and completed by the architect Henri Rieck between 1901 and 1908. The complex was conceived as a multifunctional slaughterhouse and market facility, and is now operated by the public limited company Abattoir SA. It includes former livestock facilities, covered markets, and administrative buildings, some of which have been repurposed for exhibitions and events. Plans have been announced for partial redevelopment of the site for housing.

The Abattoirs are located at 24, rue Ropsy Chaudron/Ropsy Chaudronstraat in Cureghem/Kuregem, alongside the Brussels–Charleroi Canal and adjacent to Campus Kaai of the Erasmus Brussels University of Applied Sciences and Arts (EhB).

== History ==
=== Inception of the project (1836–1876) ===
From 1836, the City of Brussels established its first slaughterhouses near the Ninove Gate, close to the Anderlecht Gate, then outside the city. Designed in a neoclassical style by the city architect Antoine Payen and later by P. Schmit, the facilities were inaugurated in 1842. Inspired by the French model introduced by Napoleon and following the guidelines of the architect Jean-Nicolas-Louis Durand, the site was placed outside the city with an orthogonal layout. Over time, however, the location proved problematic: it was in a rapidly urbanising area, distant from railway lines, requiring livestock to be driven through streets, and the facilities were too small and financially strained.

To resolve these issues, the slaughterhouse was replaced with a new facility. In 1876, the City of Brussels' mayor, Jules Anspach, proposed an intercommunal slaughterhouse in the Anderlecht hamlet of Cureghem, but the plan fell through due to disagreements over costs and profits, and the city ultimately did not build a new complex. The proposed site covered about 20 ha (49 acres) of marshy land near Brussels-West railway station, with access to the Brussels–Charleroi Canal and a potential rail connection.

=== Construction (1881–1908) ===
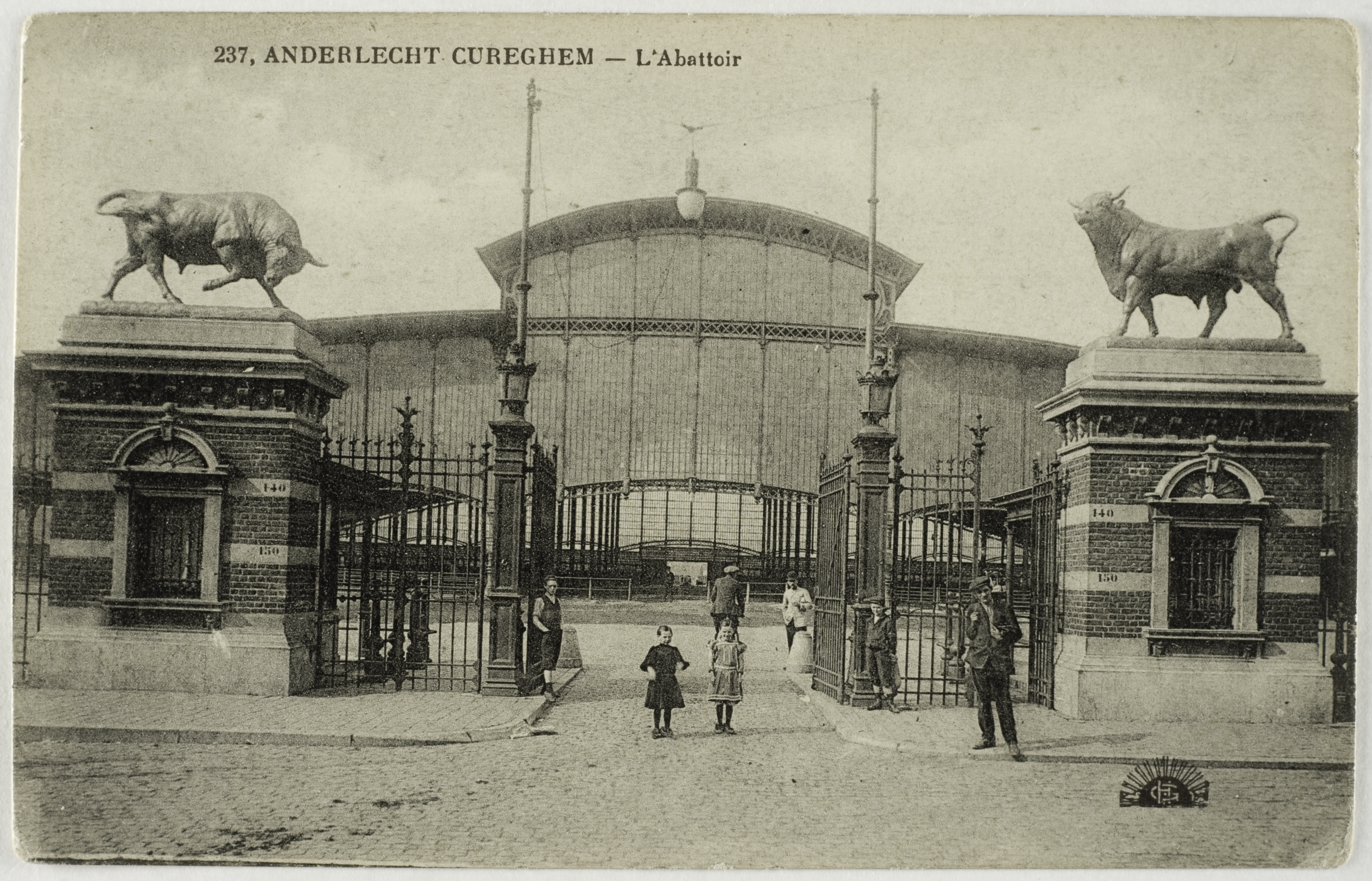
Entrance and Great Hall of the Abattoirs of Anderlecht in 1908

In 1881, the idea of a new slaughterhouse in Cureghem resurfaced. In 1881–82, two groups of financiers and industrialists proposed building a public slaughterhouse with a cattle and horse market to the Anderlecht municipality. In 1887, a fifty-year concession was granted to one group, Charlet et Pierret, which became the Société Anonyme des Abattoirs et Marchés Publics d'Anderlecht-Cureghem in 1888. In exchange, the company extended the Rue d'Allemagne/Duitslandstraat (now the Avenue Clemenceau/Clemenceaulaan) and the Rue Heyvaert/Heyvaertstraat to the main entrance of the slaughterhouse and created three new streets, officially approved in May 1888.

The architect Émile Tirou designed the complex, covering about 20 ha (49 acres), including slaughtering facilities, a cattle market, a 1 ha (2.5 acres) covered market hall, and rail access. The complex was inaugurated on 24 August 1890, though unfinished, and completed between 1901 and 1908 by the architect Henri Rieck. It was structured like a small town, with a public square, livestock markets, stables, administrative buildings, workshops, and machine halls, all connected by streets and a railway line to Brussels-West railway station.

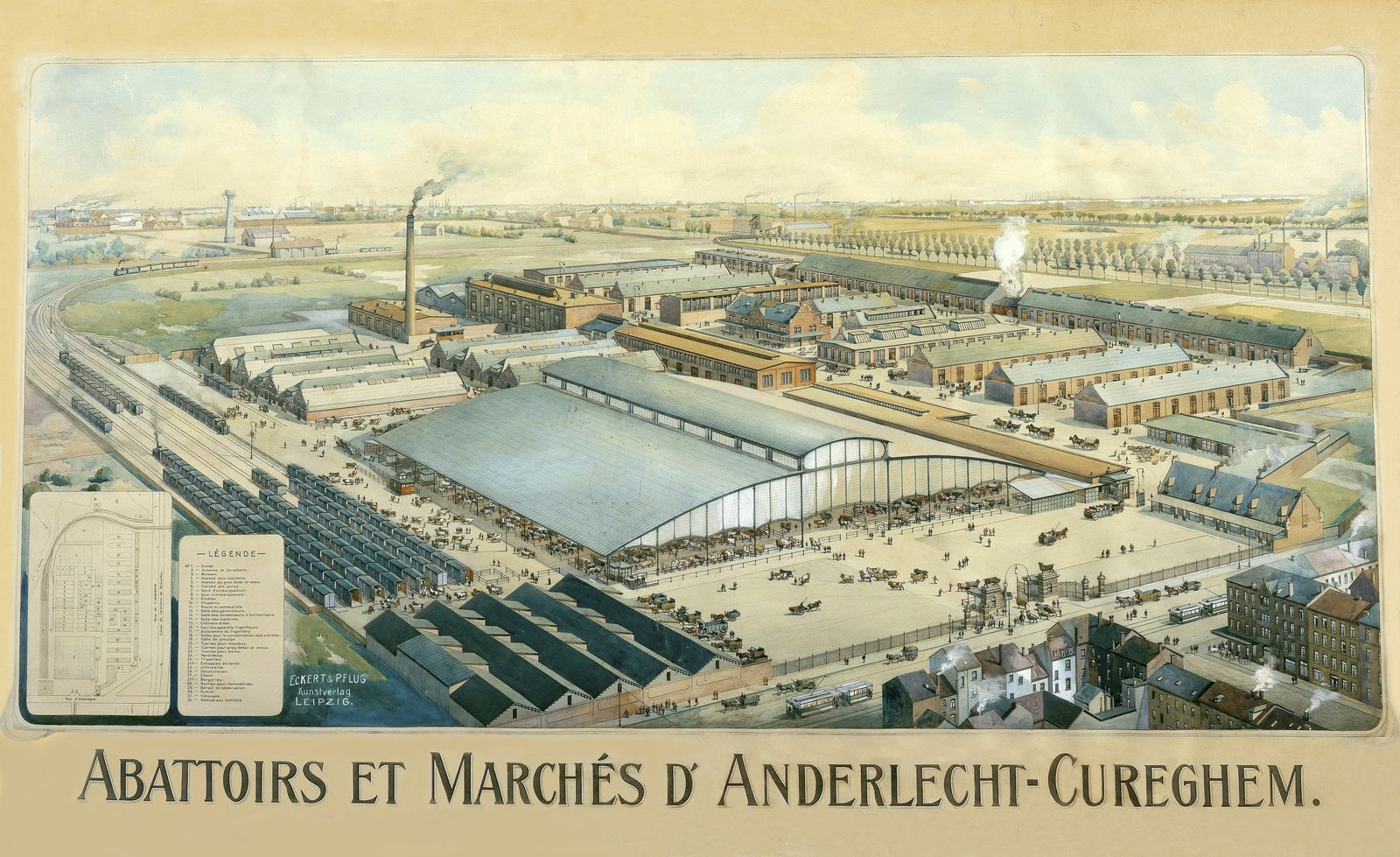
Illustration of the Abattoirs c. 1910 by Eckert & Pflug

=== Later history (1918–present) ===
After the First World War, the municipality formally took over the site under the royal decree of 19 December 1920, placing its operation under the Régie de l'Abattoir et Marchés. Between 1903 and 1905, additional market facilities, sheep stables, and administrative buildings were added, and in 1925, some buildings were modified for new services and housing for staff. In the 1950s, the cellars under the covered hall were used as mushroom farms. The rail connection to the slaughterhouse was removed in 1953 following damage to the canal bridge during the Second World War. In 1955, a plan to replace the site with social housing was considered, but the Abattoirs remained due to their high profits.

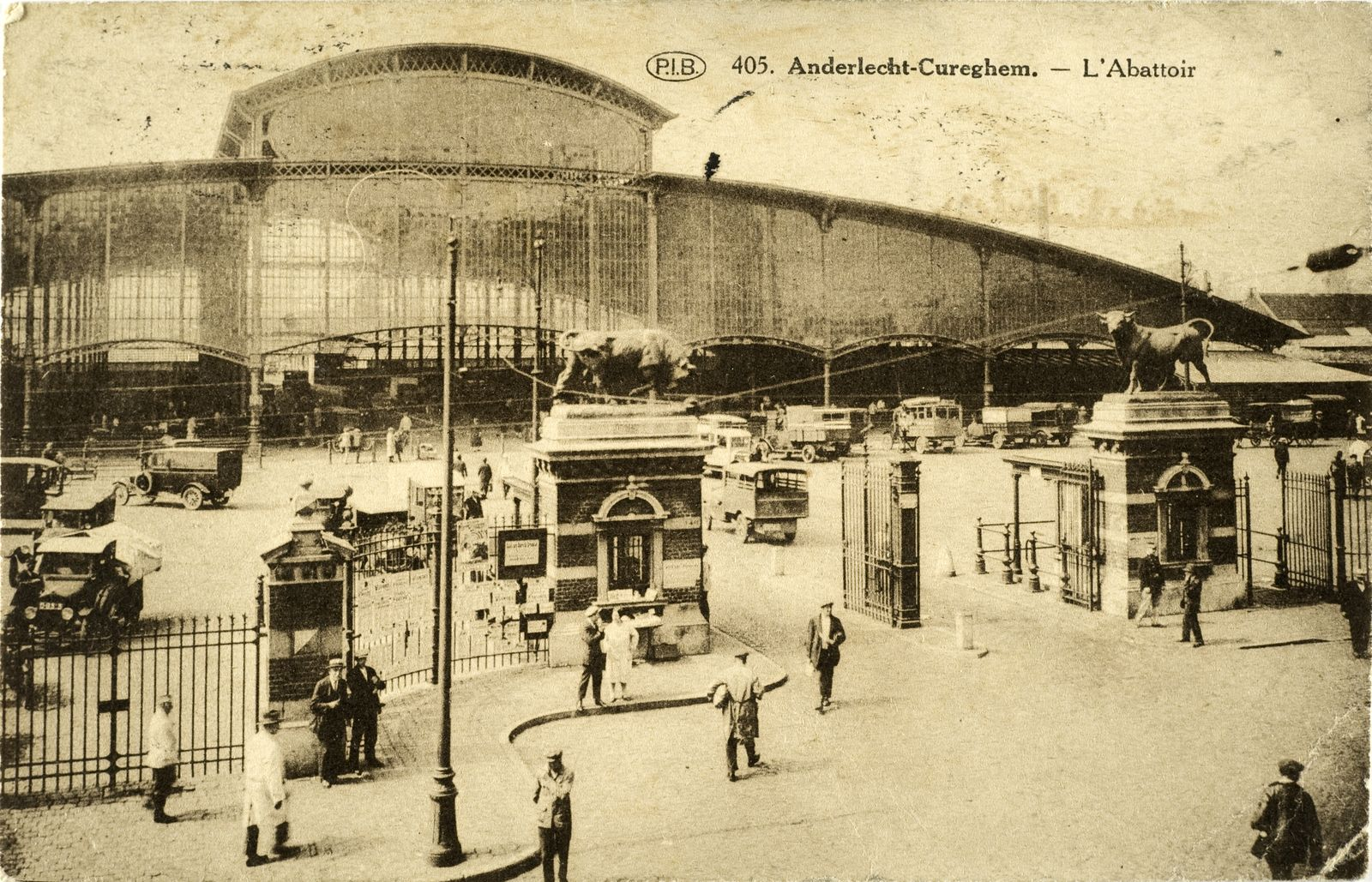
The entrance and Great Hall during the interwar period

In the 1960s, several buildings were demolished, including the locomotive depot. In 1970, aging infrastructure caused the loss of export licences, making the slaughterhouses unprofitable. The water tower was removed in 1981, and in 1983, the municipality ceased operations and declared the site bankrupt. In 1987, operations were taken over by Abatan, a public company of 150 traders and butchers, which renovated the site, modernised the facilities, and regained the lost export licences.

The Great Hall was protected as a monument on 8 August 1988. In 1992, the cellars were restored and converted into the Cureghem Cellars exhibition and event space. A fire in 1996 destroyed several old buildings, including slaughtering and refrigeration areas. The livestock market closed in 2008 due to financial and image concerns. In 2012, the company became Abattoir SA, which also launched Cultureghem, a public space in Cureghem offering community activities, healthy meals, and facilities for events, exhibitions, and local projects. In 2015, the former meat market closed and was replaced by the 12,000 m^{2} (130,000 sq ft) Foodmet hall with 45 shops, including 17 butcheries, greengrocers, and grocers. In 2018, a rooftop aquaponic urban farm was installed with a 36-year lease.

In 2019, plans for housing, student accommodation (Kotmet), and shops were considered. In 2020, the Manufakture project was proposed, aiming to replace the existing slaughter lines with a smaller facility and to add food businesses, workshops, and a rooftop pool. By February 2023, construction of the Manufakture project was underway. Later that year, the cessation of the slaughter lines was announced, with a deadline set for 2028.

In 2024, the Brussels-Capital Region accelerated redevelopment by making the Urban Development Corporation (sau-msi.brussels) co-owner of the 12 ha (30 acres) site. The Urban Development Corporation purchased most of the land from the municipality, excluding the historic market hall, and took full ownership of the canal-side area for new housing, shops, and collective facilities. Abattoir's lease was extended until 2088, and the site continues to host economic activities including the weekly markets and Foodmet. In 2026, the Brussels government approved the master plan for the site's redevelopment. This includes a permanent open-air swimming pool on the roof of the Manufakture complex, with an opening planned for 2030.

== Architecture ==
=== Porticoes and gatehouses ===
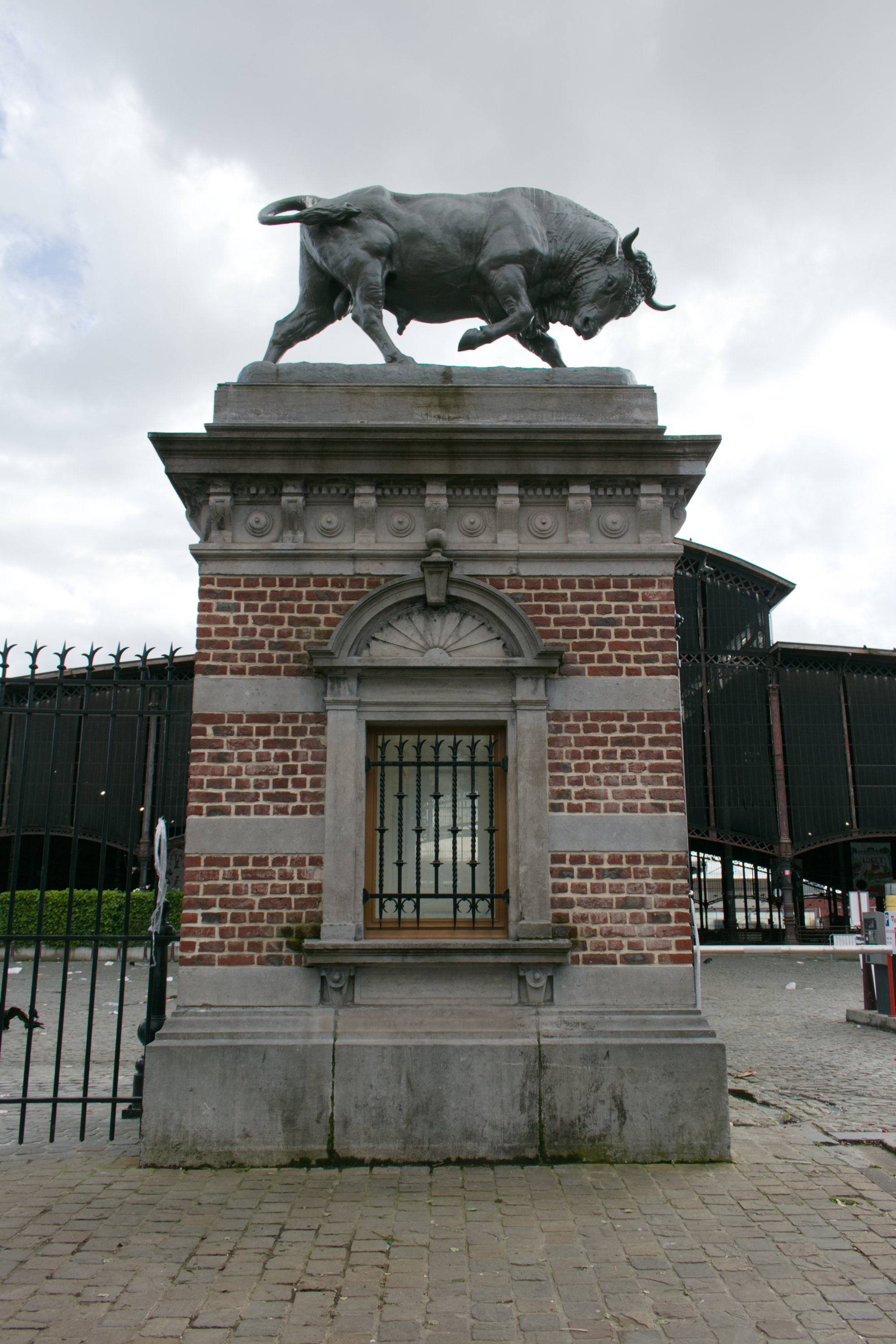
Left gatehouse, surmounted by a bronze sculpture of a charging bull

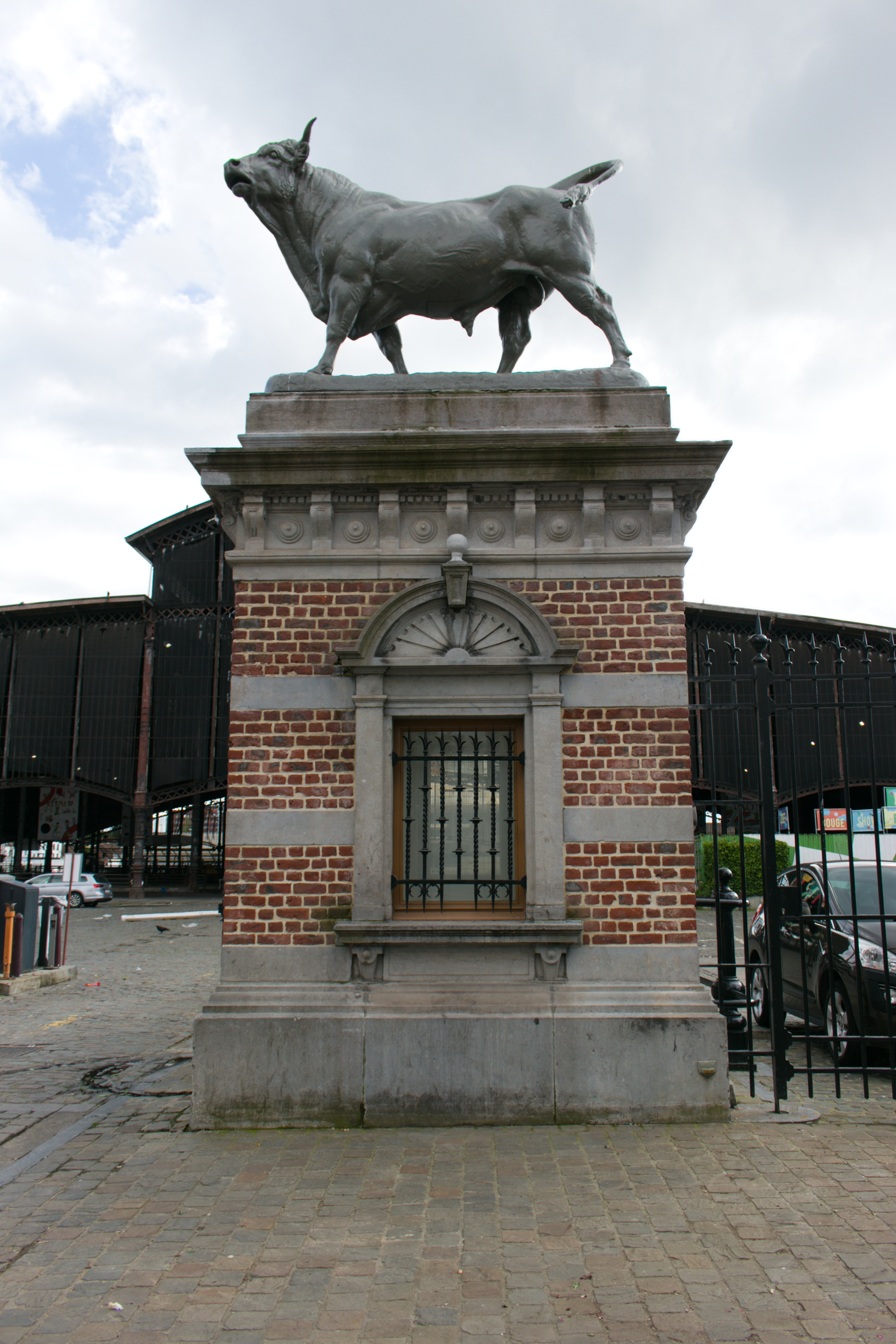
Right gatehouse, with a sculpture of a bellowing bull

The site along the Rue Ropsy Chaudron/Ropsy Chaudronstraat was originally enclosed by a metal fence designed in 1899 by Henri Rieck and installed in 1901. The fence featured lance-shaped bars with leafwork, supported by cast-iron columns with knop capitals and paterae. A monumental three-part central entrance aligned with the Rue Heyvaert, and a secondary eastern entrance, incorporated brick, stone, and cast iron.

While the fence was gradually replaced by market stalls from the 1930s, the entrance composition largely survives, including the central gate with cast-iron pillars and flanking wings. Two gate pillars serve as pedestals for a bronze bull attributed to the French sculptor Isidore Bonheur. The adjacent guardhouses are three-sided, fully glazed, and rest on cast-iron columns with Corinthian capitals.

=== Great Hall ===
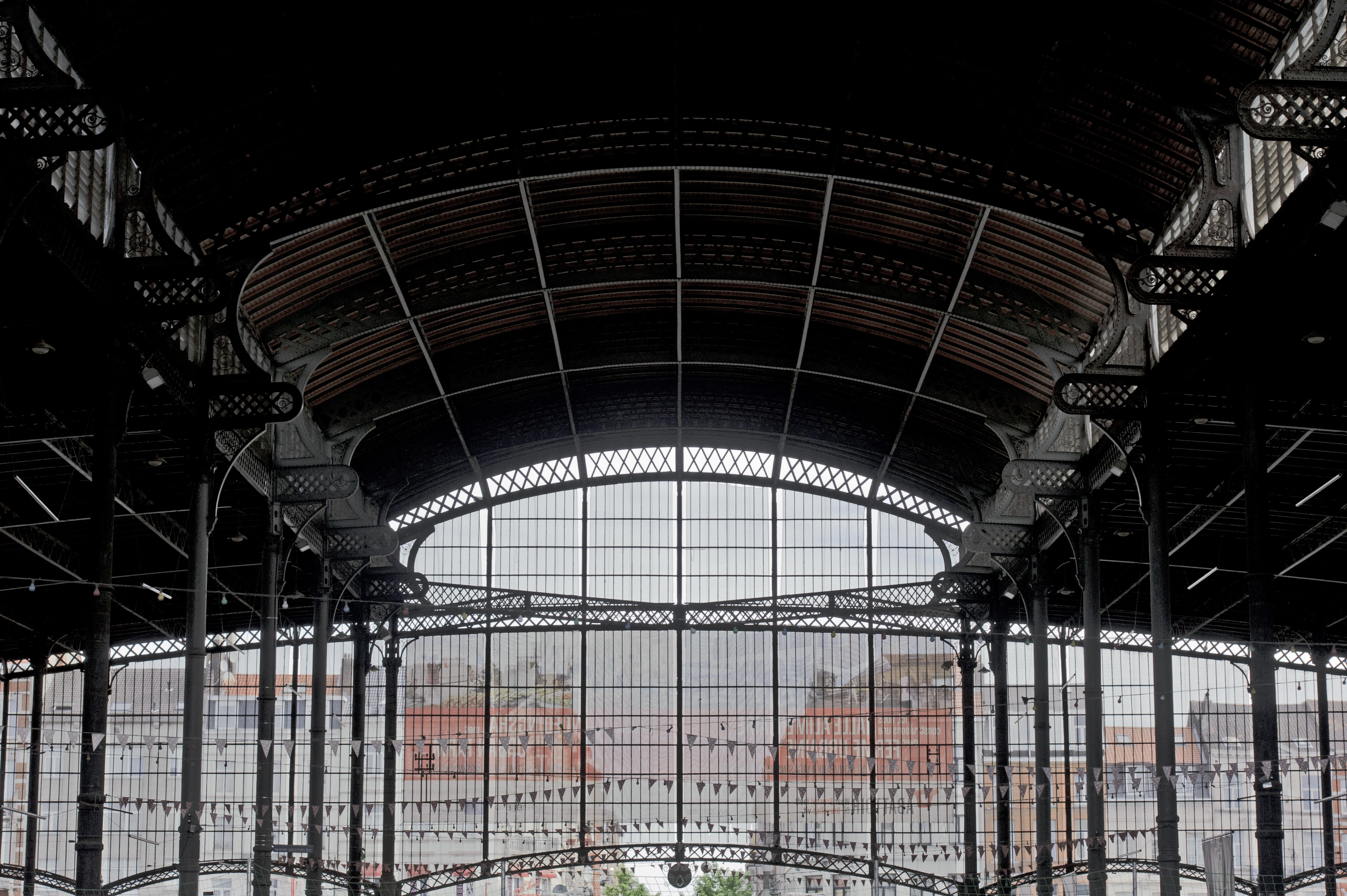
Interior view of the Great Hall

Constructed in 1889–1890 to Émile Tirou's designs, the Great Hall spans 10,000 m^{2} (110,000 sq ft) and is made entirely of iron, cast iron, and glass. Fine cast-iron columns rise from a brick basement on a 10 m (33 ft) orthogonal grid, supporting trussed beams and a large pitched roof with a central raised bay for ventilation. The 110 supports are of seventeen types with gradually increasing heights, carrying iron trusses forming full arches along the façades. The front and rear elevations feature extensive glazing on metal frameworks; most interior ironwork, including stall partitions, survives. Foundations extend up to 4 m (13 ft) deep to stabilise the building on marshy ground.

=== Former stables ===
The left-block stables, also by Tirou, were converted in the mid-20th century into dressing rooms and a refectory. Single-storey brick and stone buildings with gabled roofs display rusticated plinths, pedimented façades, and segmental-arched entrances. Ventilation was provided via top-gable lunette windows. Four remaining stables at the block's west side preserve these architectural details under a unified flat roof.

=== Administrative offices ===
Originally built as market stalls (1889–1890) and later repurposed for administrative functions, the brick and stone building on a rusticated plinth was remodelled in 1925 by the architect Thilly with a new upper floor, modified façades, and additional office space. The structure retains original layout elements, including entrances, window groupings, and cast-iron pillars from the old gate, while integrating expansions and modernised fenestration.

== Markets ==
=== Foodmet ===
Foodmet is a food hall, opened on 29 May 2015. It hosts over 50 stalls specialising exclusively in food, including butcheries, a fish market, bakeries, and vendors of fruit, vegetables, olives, and nuts. A rooftop urban farm contains small gardens and greenhouses for growing vegetables and herbs. Foodmet operates Friday through Sunday from 7 a.m. to 2 p.m. and remains open on public holidays. The construction of the hall cost €7.5 million, co-funded by the European Union and the Brussels-Capital Region.

=== Brocantemet ===
Brocantemet is an flea market operating Friday through Sunday from 7 a.m. to 2 p.m., offering a variety of second-hand goods and antiques. Market stalls of 5 m^{2} (54 sq ft) are rented on-site on a first-come, first-served basis, with access beginning at 5 a.m.

== See also ==
- History of Brussels
- Belgium in the long nineteenth century
