= Journal of Belgian History =

- Discipline: History of Belgium
- Language: Dutch, English, French
- Edited by: Bruno De Wever, Chantal Kesteloot, Nico Wouters

Publication details
- Former names: Belgisch tijdschrift voor nieuwste geschiedenis/Revue belge d'histoire contemporaine, Bijdragen tot de Eigentijdse Geschiedenis/Cahiers d'Histoire du Temps présent
- History: 1969-present
- Publisher: Centre for Historical Research and Documentation on War and Contemporary Society (Belgium)
- Frequency: Quarterly

Standard abbreviations
- ISO 4: J. Belg. Hist.

Indexing
- ISSN: 0035-0869
- LCCN: 78649401
- OCLC no.: 1880932

Links
- Journal homepage

The Journal of Belgian History is a quarterly peer-reviewed academic journal published by the Centre for Historical Research and Documentation on War and Contemporary Society (Cegesoma). It focuses on the history of Belgium in the 19th and 20th centuries. One of the four yearly issues is published in English, the other three in French and Dutch. The journal is abstracted and indexed in the Arts and Humanities Citation Index.

The editors-in-chief are Catherine Lanneau (University of Liège) and Nico Wouters (Cegesoma).

== History ==
The Journal of Belgian History was first published under its current title in 2012. The current journal was created by a merger of two long-running publications:

- Belgisch tijdschrift voor nieuwste geschiedenis/Revue belge d'histoire contemporaine (Belgian Review of Contemporary History), founded in 1969
- Bijdragen tot de Eigentijdse Geschiedenis/Cahiers d'Histoire du Temps présent (Journal of Contemporary History), founded in 1996.

== See also ==
- Revue belge de philologie et d'histoire
