= Study and Documentation Centre for War and Contemporary Society =

Research institute and archive in Brussels, Belgium

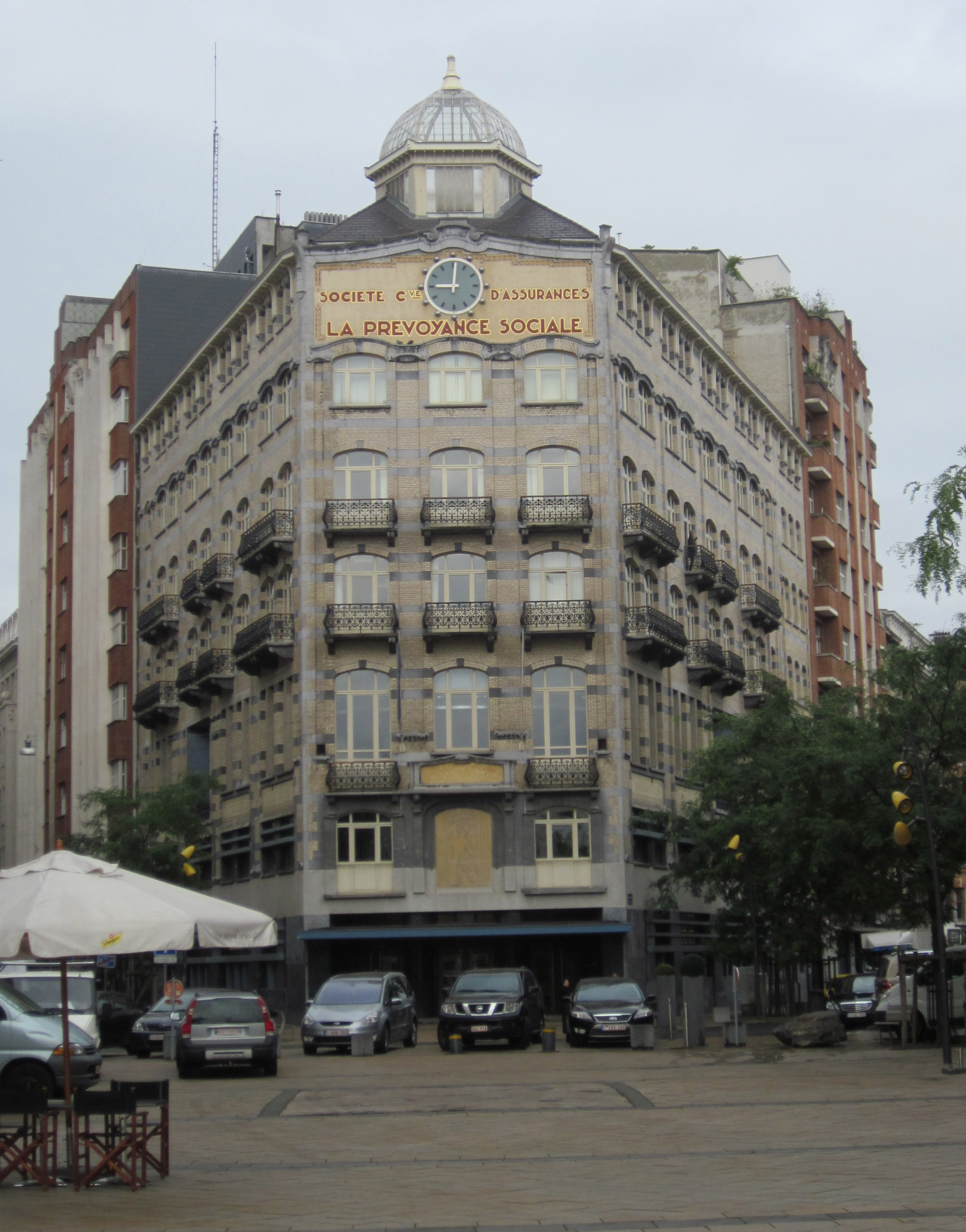
La Prévoyance Sociale building on the Square de l'Aviation/Luchtvaartsquare in Anderlecht, Brussels, housing Cegesoma

The Study and Documentation Centre for War and Contemporary Society (French: Centre d'Études et de Documentation Guerre et Sociétés contemporaines; Dutch: Studie- en Documentatiecentrum Oorlog en Hedendaagse Maatschappij), known by its combined French–Dutch acronym Cegesoma or CegeSoma, is a historical research institute and archive based in Anderlecht, a municipality of Brussels, Belgium. It focuses on World War II and the contemporary history of Belgium. Since 2016, it has formed part of the Belgian State Archives. Its director is Nico Wouters.

== History ==
The centre was founded on 13 December 1967 as the Centre for Research and Historical Study into the Second World War (French: Centre de Recherches et d'Études historiques de la Seconde Guerre mondiale, CREHSGM; Dutch: Navorsings- en Studiecentrum van de Geschiedenis van de Tweede Wereldoorlog, NSGWO). It was created in response to the legal acquittal of Robert Jan Verbelen, a Flemish collaborator, in 1965, as a result of insufficient documentary records. From 1969, the institution began to actively collect publications, interviews and archives relating to the Second World War. Subsequently, it began to expand the scope of its research into the First World War and other aspects of contemporary history. In 1997, it was renamed the Centre for Study and Documentary on War and Contemporary Society (French: Centre d'Études et de Documentation Guerre et Sociétés contemporaines; Dutch: Studie- en Documentatiecentrum Oorlog en Hedendaagse Maatschappij). It became an autonomous part of the State Archives of Belgium in 2016.

=== Major projects ===
Notable projects run by the centre include:

- Belgian War Press: a digital archive of Belgian newspapers published during World War I and II, both "censored" and "clandestine";
- Belgium WWII: an educational resource on aspects of Belgian history during World War II.

== Research ==
The centre has supported a range of monographs, edited volumes and peer-reviewed journals including the Journal of Belgian History. It is a member of the European Network for Contemporary History (EURHISTXX).

== See also ==
- List of archives in Belgium
- Belgian Federal Science Policy Office (BELSPO)
- NIOD Institute for War, Holocaust and Genocide Studies - an equivalent institution in the Netherlands
- Royal Library of Belgium
- Journal of Belgian History
