= Louis Melsens =

Belgian physicist & chemist (1814-1886)

Louis Melsens

Louis Henri Frédéric Melsens (11 July 1814 – 20 April 1886) was a Belgian physicist and chemist. He was professor of chemistry at the Royal Veterinary School of Cureghem in Anderlecht, Brussels. Melsens applied the principle of the Faraday cage to lightning conductors and invented tincture of iodine for disinfection. In medical circles he became internationally famous for his research on oral administration of potassium iodide as a cure for mercury or lead poisoning.

== Life and career ==
Melsens was born in Leuven on 11 July 1814, first of at least 5 children to Henri Melsens and Marie Henriette Françoise Hamoir. He was first home-schooled by his mother and went on to high school in Leuven. He studied ancient languages, as well as English, German and Italian, and began his career in the offices of a commercial firm in Antwerp, with the Josson brothers. Not really having a commercial streak, he decided to devote the rest his life to the study of science. On the advice of his mother and his fellow student Jean Servais Stas, he went to Paris to work in Jean-Baptiste Dumas's private laboratory for 4 years, during which time he worked and shared an apartment with Stas. Subsequently, he studied chemistry in Bonn, Germany, where he attended Liebig's laboratory, and at the University of Giessen.

In Belgium, he obtained the chair of physics and chemistry at the Royal Veterinary School of Cureghem and permanent examiner at the Belgian Royal Military Academy. He was appointed correspondent of the Royal Academy of Belgium, on 16 December 1846 and became a member of the institution on 15 December 1850. He was made knight in the Order of Leopold in 1856 or 1857, before his marriage to Wilhelmine Jeanne Marie Koli on 30 July 1857. He was director of the Classe des sciences in 1859.

Melsens had at least one daughter, whom he survived. He suffered from poor health throughout his life, and died at the age of 71 on 20 April 1886 in Brussels. He is buried in Evere.

== Scientific achievements ==
Melsens mainly did research in organic chemistry, although he also pioneered uses of inorganic iodine in medicine. As early as 1843, he collaborated with Natalis Guillot on the curative properties of potassium iodide administered to people suffering from lead or mercury poisoning, for which in 1877 he was awarded the Guinard Prize by the Royal Academy of Belgium, given to the scientist who has written the best work or created the best invention to improve the material or intellectual position of the working class. He also received the Montyon Prize by the Paris Academy of Sciences in 1865.

He also carried out research on lightning rods and invented an improved version of Benjamin Franklin's original design.

== Streets and scientific award named in his honor ==
The Louis Melsens Prize is awarded to a Belgian or naturalised Belgian author of the most remarkable work on applied chemistry or physics. The Melsensstraat or Rue Melsens in Brussels and the Louis Melsensstraat in Leuven are streets named after him.

== Sources ==
- Louis Melsens on bestor.be (French)
- Le paratonnerre à cage métallique de Louis Melsens (French)
- D. Thorburn Burns and Hendrik Deelstra, Analytical chemistry in Belgium: an historical overview, Microchimica Acta, Volume 161, Numbers 1–2, April 2008, pp. 41–66
- Melsens street
