= Faculty of Veterinary Medicine, University of Liège =

Belgium's oldest veterinary school

Coordinates: 50.5774°N 5.5783°E

Faculty of Veterinary Medicine
- Faculté de médecine vétérinaire
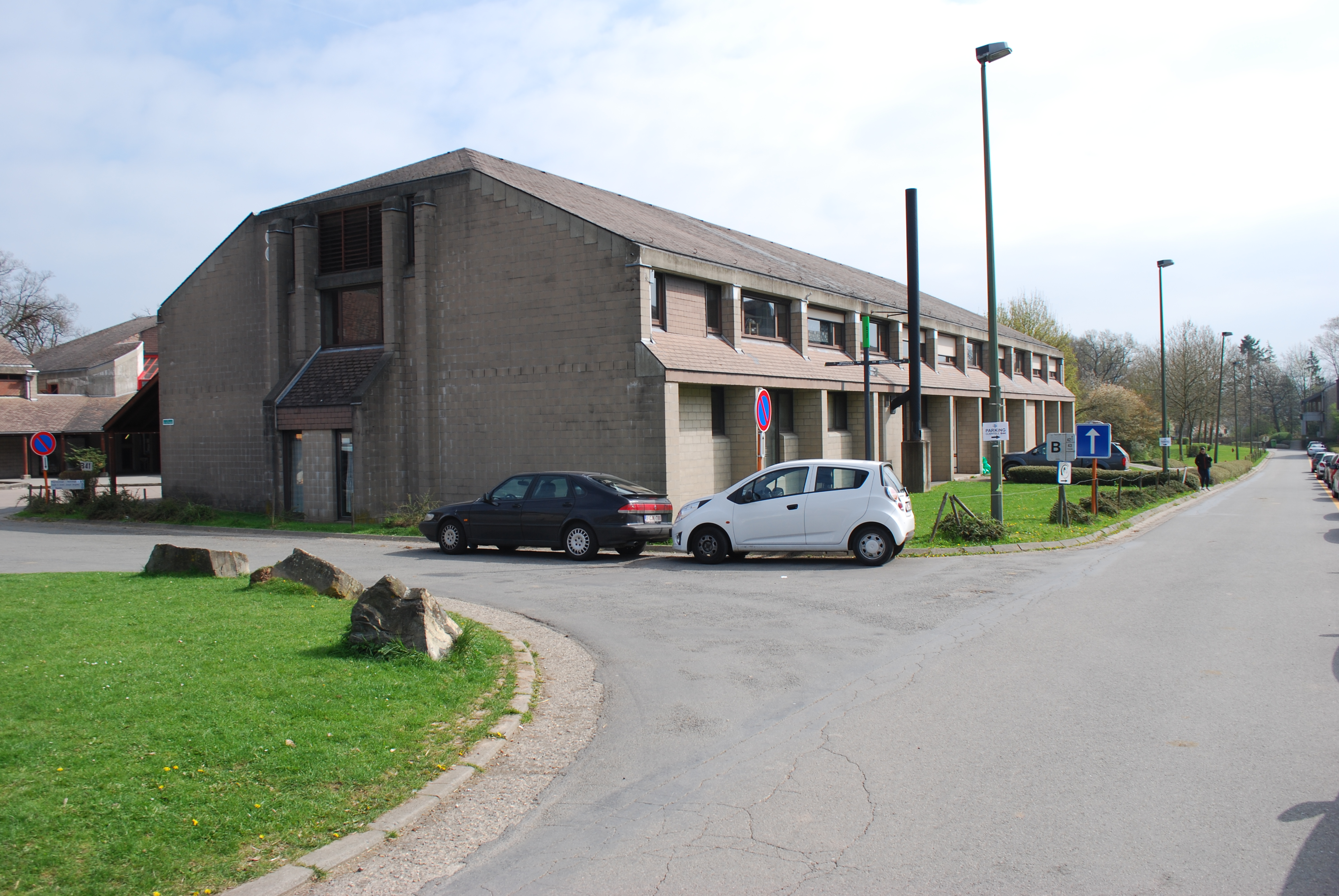
- The Faculty of Veterinary Medicine on the Sart Tilman campus, in Liège
- Other names: FMV
- Former names: School of Veterinary Medicine and Rural Economy (1832); École Royale de Médecine vétérinaire de Cureghem (1836); Cureghem University Faculty of Veterinary Medicine (1965)
- Motto: Scientia Optimum
- Motto in English: Excellence through science
- Founder: King Leopold I
- Type: Public university
- Established: 1832 (194 years ago)
- Parent institution: University of Liège
- Rector: Prof. Pierre Wolper
- Dean: Georges Daube
- Students: 1,600
- Location: Liège, Belgium
- Language: French, English
- Colours: FMV rich blue & ULiège teal blue
- Website: fmv.uliege.be

The Faculty Veterinary Medicine of the University of Liège (French: Faculté de médecine vétérinaire de l'Université de Liège), sometimes historically referred to as Cureghem, is a faculty of the University of Liège, established in Liège, Belgium. It was founded in 1832 as the Royal School of Veterinary Medicine of Cureghem in Anderlecht, a municipality of Brussels. Consistently ranked within the world's top 50 veterinary institutions, it is the oldest veterinary school in Belgium and the only French-speaking institution to provide full veterinary education.

== History ==
=== Brussels ===
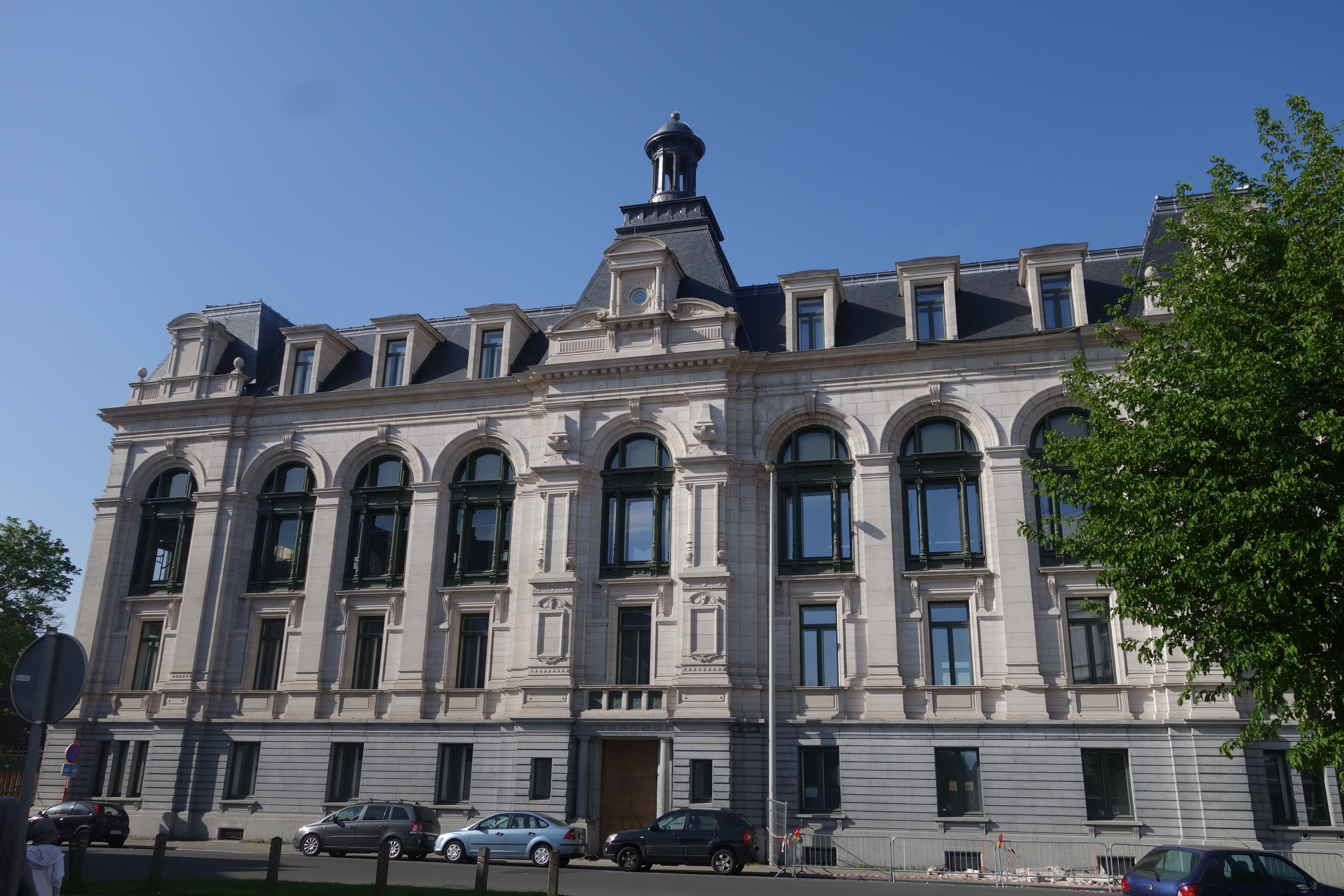
Historic main building of the Veterinary School, in Anderlecht, Brussels

In 1832, shortly after Belgium's independence, King Leopold I ordered the creation of a commission for the teaching and awarding of official diplomas in veterinary medicine. The School of Veterinary Medicine and Rural Economics (French: École vétérinaire et d'économie rurale) was founded in the centre of the City of Brussels, where the commission was based, on the present site of the Centre for Fine Arts. It was transferred to Cureghem, in the municipality of Anderlecht, Brussels, in 1836 and changed its name to the Royal Veterinary School of Cureghem (French: École royale de Médecine vétérinaire de Cureghem). It would remain the only veterinary school in the country for over a century. Teaching is done in French.

Because of its location close to the Senne river, the school has to cope with the many overflows. In 1892, the school moved to a specially built campus, still in Anderlecht, consisting of 19 Flemish neo-renaissance buildings. These new buildings are connected to each other by cellars equipped with decompression chimneys, preventing the premises from flooding. The buildings are also largely covered with lightning rods, because the modern version of these had been invented by Louis Melsens, professor at the Royal School of Cureghem.

Since 1965 (Law of 9 April), the Veterinary School of Cureghem as well as its more recently established Dutch-speaking counterpart in Ghent were considered as autonomous university faculties. Cureghem was then renamed the Faculty of Veterinary Medicine (French: Faculté de médecine vétérinaire). In 1968, government decided to integrate the two existing veterinary schools into universities. Only two state universities existed at that time, the State Universities of Ghent and Liège. The school administratively joined the University of Liège in 1969, the only French-speaking public university. All the universities in Brussels (notably the Free University of Brussels, Saint-Louis University and the University of Louvain) are free subsidized (private) institutions.

The faculty celebrated its 150th anniversary in 1986.

=== Liège ===
As soon as the Cureghem school was integrated into the University of Liège in 1969, plans were made to transfer the entity to the city of Liège. The design of the new veterinary campus began in 1973, and its construction started on 23 September 1980.

In 1991, the faculty of the University of Liège, still based in Brussels, finally moved to Liège to join six other faculties on the new Sart Tilman campus. This move was completed in 1993, which is also when the construction of the last building, the southern extension, was started.

A new part of the Sart Tilman hill was cleared to accommodate the veterinary school. It was called the Cureghem district, south of the Sart Tilman hill, near the University Hospital and Liège Sports Centre. The project was led by the Centre de recherches en architecture et urbanisme (CRAU), a group of architects and engineers of the University of Liège. The site of the new Faculty of Veterinary Medicine is 35,000 m^{2} large.

In 2019, a new 5,600 m^{2} house pet hospital is inaugurated by Minister of Higher Education Jean-Claude Marcourt.

== Description ==
The Faculty of Veterinary Medicine of Liège is one of only two veterinary schools in Belgium (together with the University of Ghent, historically the two state universities) authorised to offer a complete veterinary science curriculum including master's, advanced masters, doctorates and research. The other accredited universities are only limited to the issuing of bachelor's degrees. It is also the only public veterinary faculty in the Wallonia-Brussels Federation.

The faculty has 1,600 students and offers 14 bachelors, masters, advanced masters, university certificates and teaching certificates, as well as doctoral programmes, in French and English. It also organises summer schools in veterinary sciences. It is a member of the European Association of Veterinary Education Establishments (EAEVE), the European Commission's body accrediting veterinary schools within the European Union. Furthermore, it is composed of 7 research departments, the FARAH (Fundamental and Applied Research for Animals & Health) faculty research unit and 3 interfaculty units in science and medical sciences.

In addition, the University Veterinary Clinic of the University of Liège, the only one in French-speaking Belgium, is composed of three separate clinics; for equidae, ruminant-pigs and house pets. The latter, which alone takes care of 12,000 animals per year and 1,400 surgical interventions, moved to a new entirely dedicated building in 2019. The University Clinic has the particularity of taking care of all types of species, large and small, local and exotic animals. It also has the only MRI suited for horses in Wallonia, as well as another one specially dedicated to small animals, and three emergency services (for equidae, house pets and ruminant-pigs) that are permanently open, every day of the week and all night long.

=== Organisation ===
==== Departments ====
- Clinical Department of Pets and Equidae (DCA)
- Clinical Department of Production Animals (DCP)
- Department of Infectious and Parasitic Diseases (DMI)
- Department of Morphology and Pathology (DMP)
- Department of Veterinary Animal Resources Management (DRA)
- Department of Food Science (DDA)
- Department of Functional Sciences (FSD)
- Tropical Veterinary Institute (TVI)
  - Tropical Agricultural and Veterinary Centre of Kinshasa (CAVTK), in the Democratic Republic of Congo

==== Research units ====
- Fundamental and Applied Research for Animals & Health (FARAH)
  - Sector of Veterinary Public Health Sector
  - Sector of Sustainable Animal Production
  - Sector of Comparative Veterinary Medicine
- Institute for Interdisciplinary Research in Biomedical Sciences (GIGA)
- Teaching and Research Centre (TERRA)
- Motion Analysis Research Unit (MARU)

==== University Veterinary Clinic ====
- Animal Pet Clinic
- Equine Clinic
- Ruminant-Pig Clinic

=== Studies ===
The faculty offers general training in veterinary medicine, health risk management, medicine and health risks in southern countries, equine dentistry, food chain control, food safety, equine orthopaedics, equine revalidation and beekeeping. It also organises the necessary training to award the legal titles of Master of Experiment, laboratory animal caretakers and technicians, accredited by Felasa (the Federation of European Laboratory Animal Science Associations), which are compulsory for experimentation using laboratory animals.

==== Student enrollment ====
In order to limit the influx of foreign students, the number of non-Belgian resident students is capped each year at 20% according to the number of Belgian resident students enrolled the previous year.

== Certifications and rankings ==
The quality of the teaching of the faculty has been assessed by the European Association of Veterinary Education Establishments (AEEEV), which has given it the status of "approved".

=== International academic rankings ===
Veterinary medicine is the field in which the University of Liège is best rated in international academic rankings.

In 2017, the faculty was ranked as the world's 21st best veterinary school in the Shanghai Jiao Tong University Academic Ranking of World Universities (ARWU), based on research and publications in certain specialized scientific journals, and 38th in 2018.

It is ranked 45th in the world by the QS World University Rankings in 2017 and 2018.
