= Place de la Vaillance =

Square in Anderlecht, Belgium

Place de la Vaillance (French); Dapperheidsplein (Dutch)
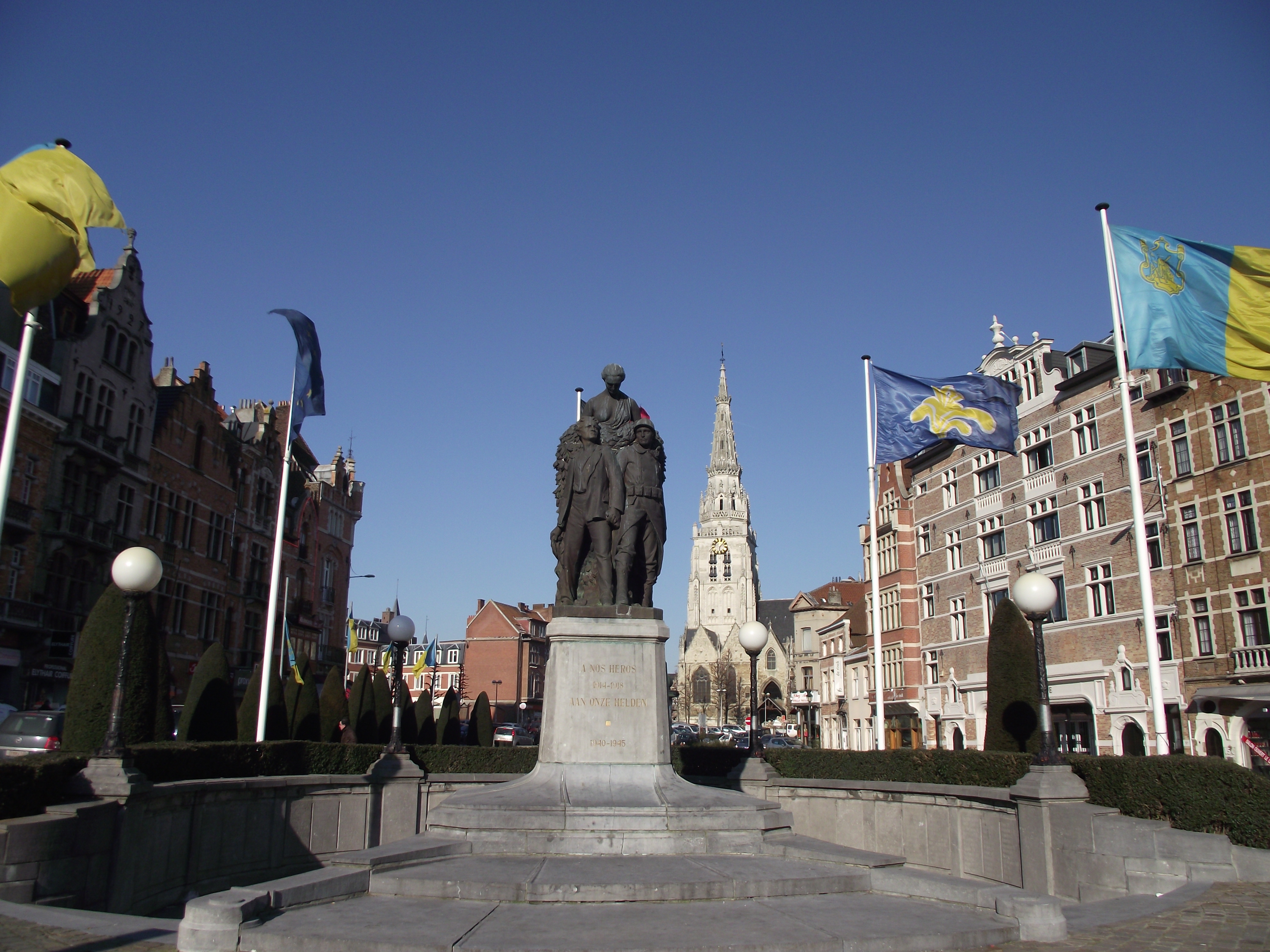
- The Place de la Vaillance/Dapperheidsplein in Anderlecht, Brussels

- Location within Brussels Location within Belgium
- Former names: Place de la Plaine (French); Pleinplaats (Dutch)
- Type: Square
- Location: Anderlecht, Brussels-Capital Region, Belgium
- Quarter: Historical centre
- Postal code: 1070
- Nearest metro station: 5 Saint-Guidon/Sint-Guido
- Coordinates: 50°50′08″N 04°18′23″E

The Place de la Vaillance (French, pronounced [plas də la vajɑ̃s]) or Dapperheidsplein (Dutch, pronounced [ˈdɑpərɦɛitsˌplɛin]), meaning "Valour Square", is the main square in the historical centre of Anderlecht, a municipality of Brussels, Belgium. It is served by Saint-Guidon/Sint-Guido metro station on line 5 of the Brussels Metro.

== History and layout ==
The square was originally known as the Place de la Plaine/Pleinplaats ("Plain Square"). In the 1910s, it was considerably enlarged. As early as 1912, historicist style houses fitted with Baroque and neo-Flemish Renaissance gables were erected. A second wave of construction (from 1923 to 1928) followed a redevelopment of the square.

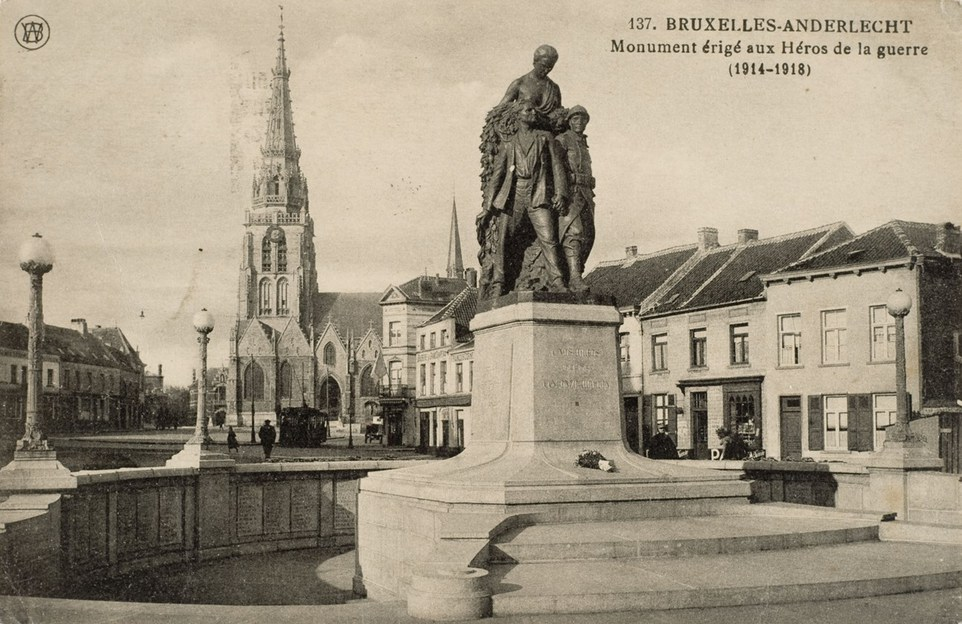
The Place de la Plaine/Pleinplaats in the 1920s

On the Place de la Vaillance, there was a cinema called Le Vaillance, that opened in 1931 and closed in 1969, and is currently a Dutch-language music academy. At the corner of the square and the Rue du Chapitre/Kapittelstraat is a 17th-century house, which long served as an inn, and now houses the Dutch-speaking cultural centre De Rinck. The monument dedicated to the heroes of the First World War by Victor Voets, which occupies its southern side, has been listed as a historic monument since 2013.

== Surroundings ==
The Place de la Vaillance is bordered to the north by the Collegiate Church of St. Peter and St. Guido, named after Saint Guy, patron saint of Anderlecht, who died around 1012. This church, mentioned for the first time in 1075, was built in the Brabantine Gothic style, mostly from around 1350 to 1527. Its square tower was completed in 1898 by the addition of an octagonal spire. Beneath the church lies a Romanesque crypt.

Close to the church is the old beguinage of Anderlecht, a late medieval lay convent. This building dates back to the 13th century and was restored in 1634 and 1978. It is currently a museum dedicated to religious community life. Not far from there, on the Rue du Chapitre, is the Erasmus House, a late Gothic or early Renaissance style house where the Dutch humanist writer and theologian Erasmus of Rotterdam stayed in 1521. This site is now a museum dedicated to Erasmus and the humanist movement. The house is complemented by a garden which includes a space for medicinal herbs. Not far away is the picturesque Rue Porselein/Porseleinstraat, as well as the Maurice Carême Museum.

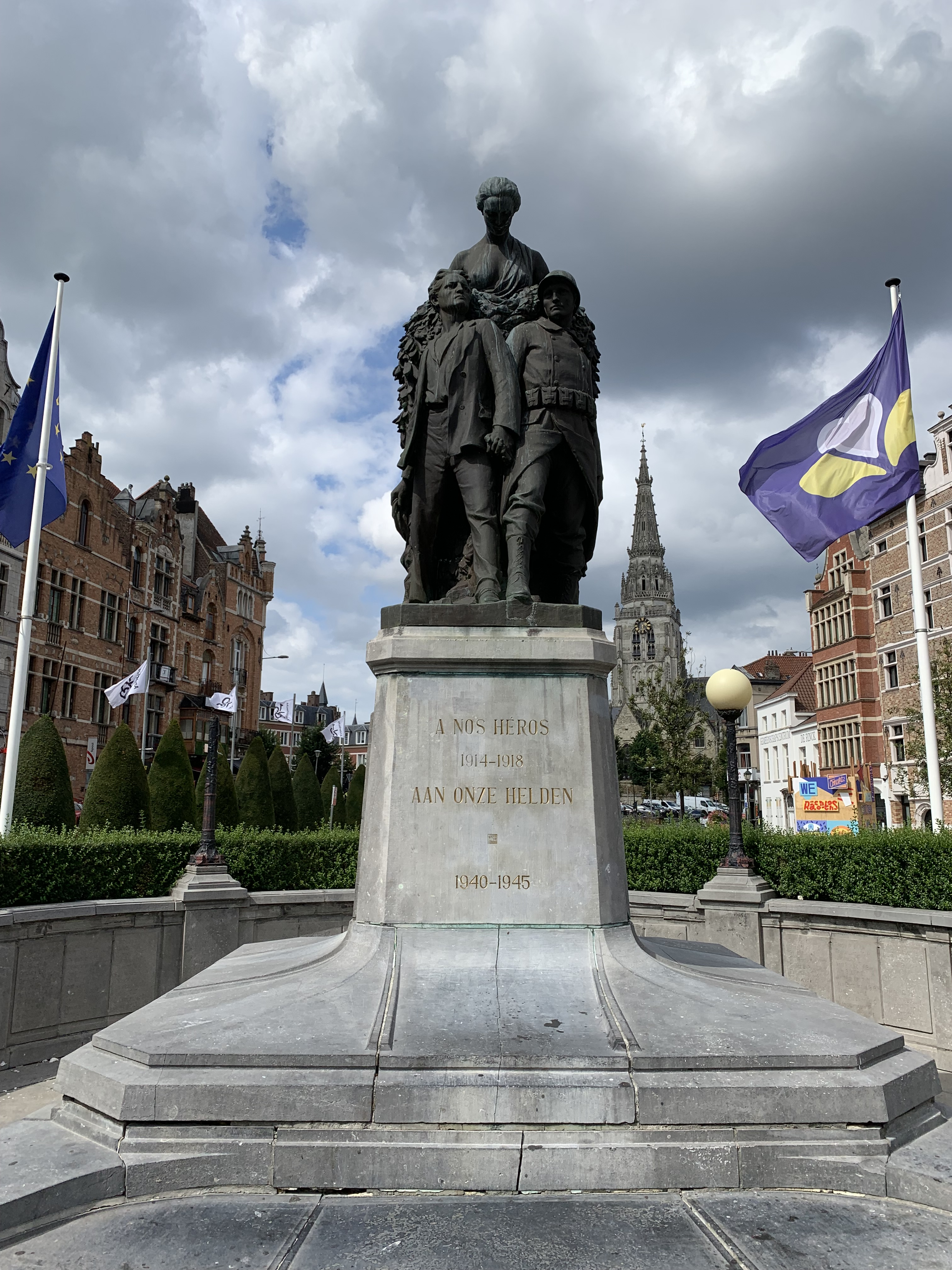
Monument to the Heroes of the War (Voets, 1914–1918)

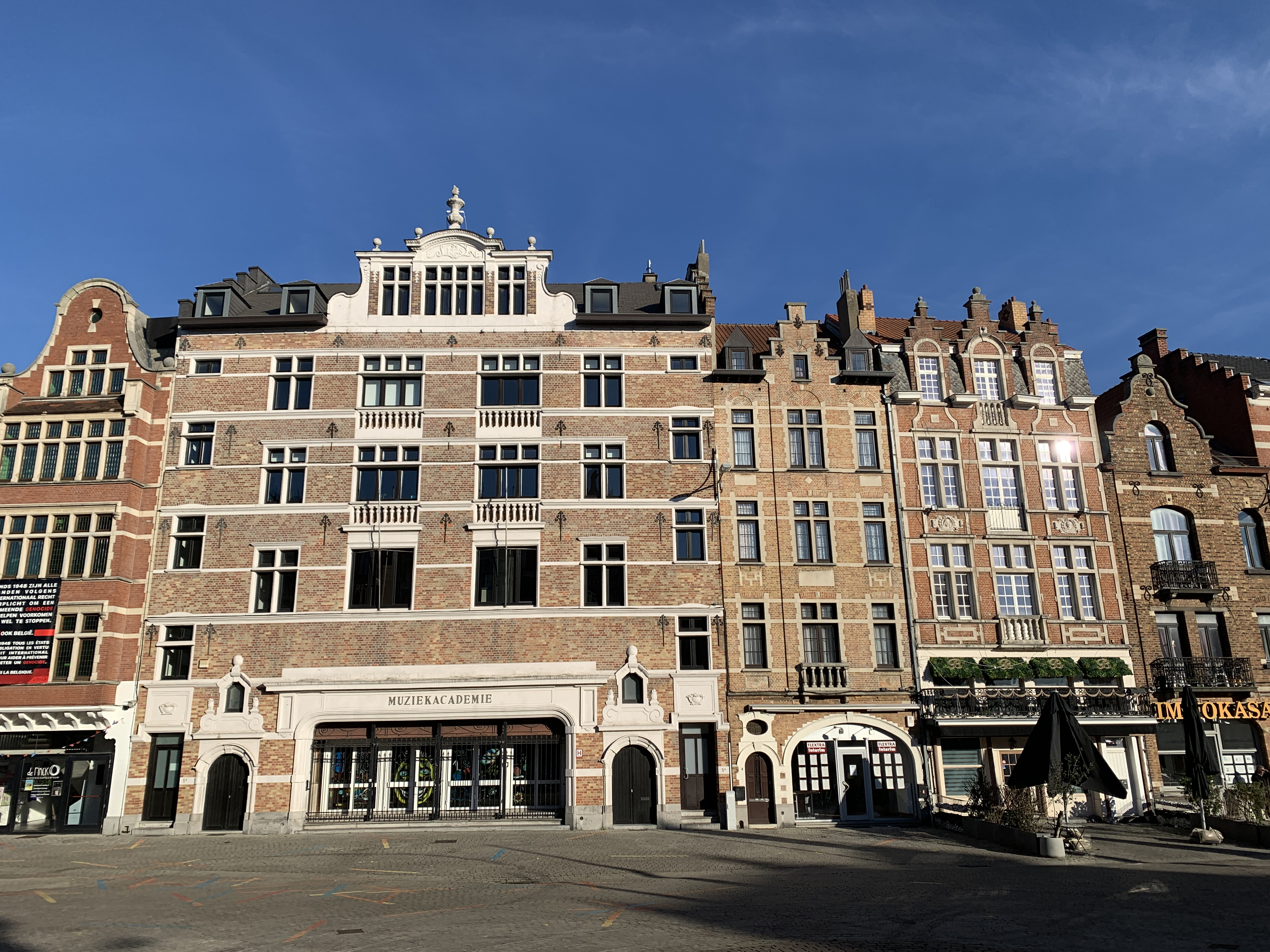
Eastern side with former cinema Vaillance

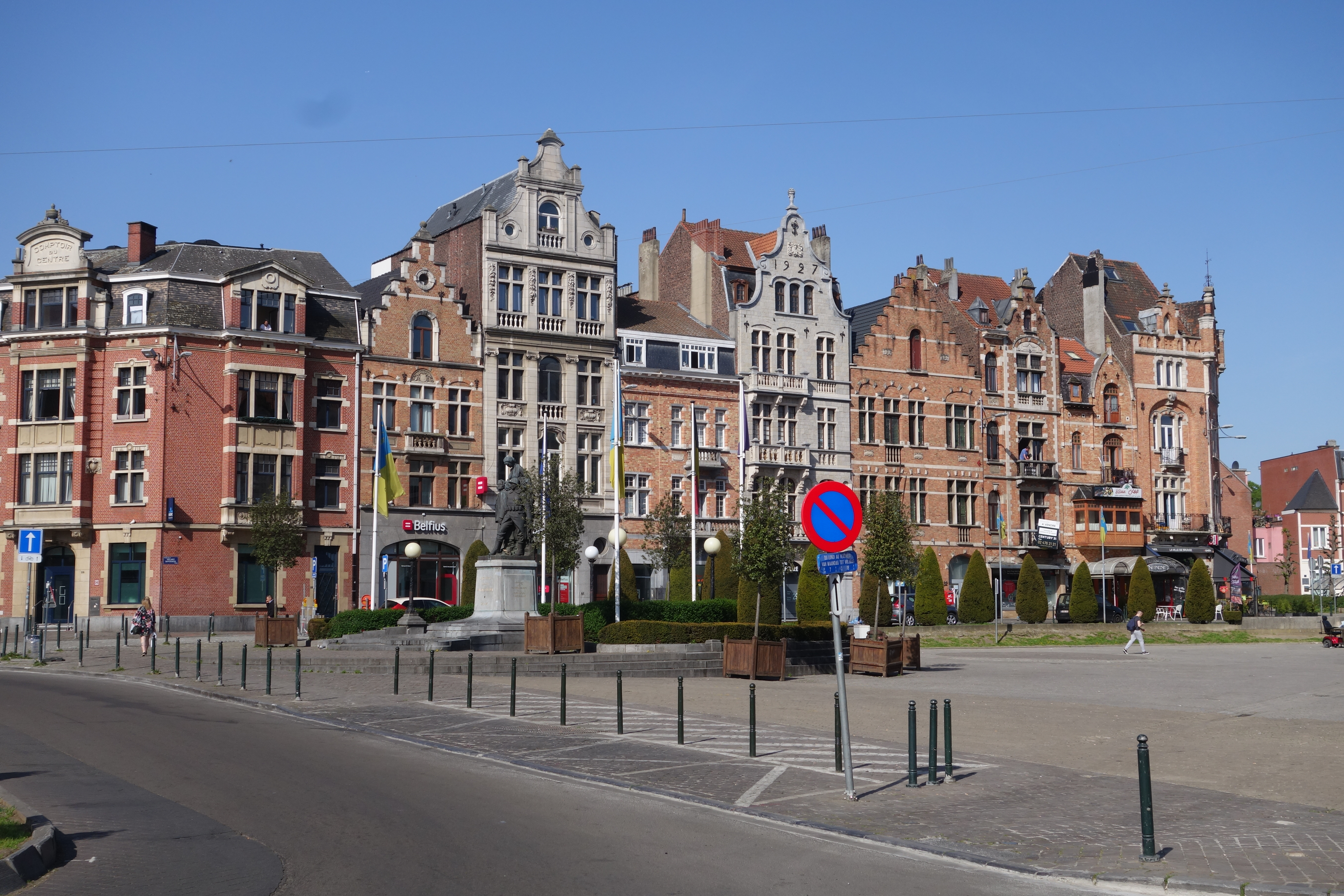
Western side

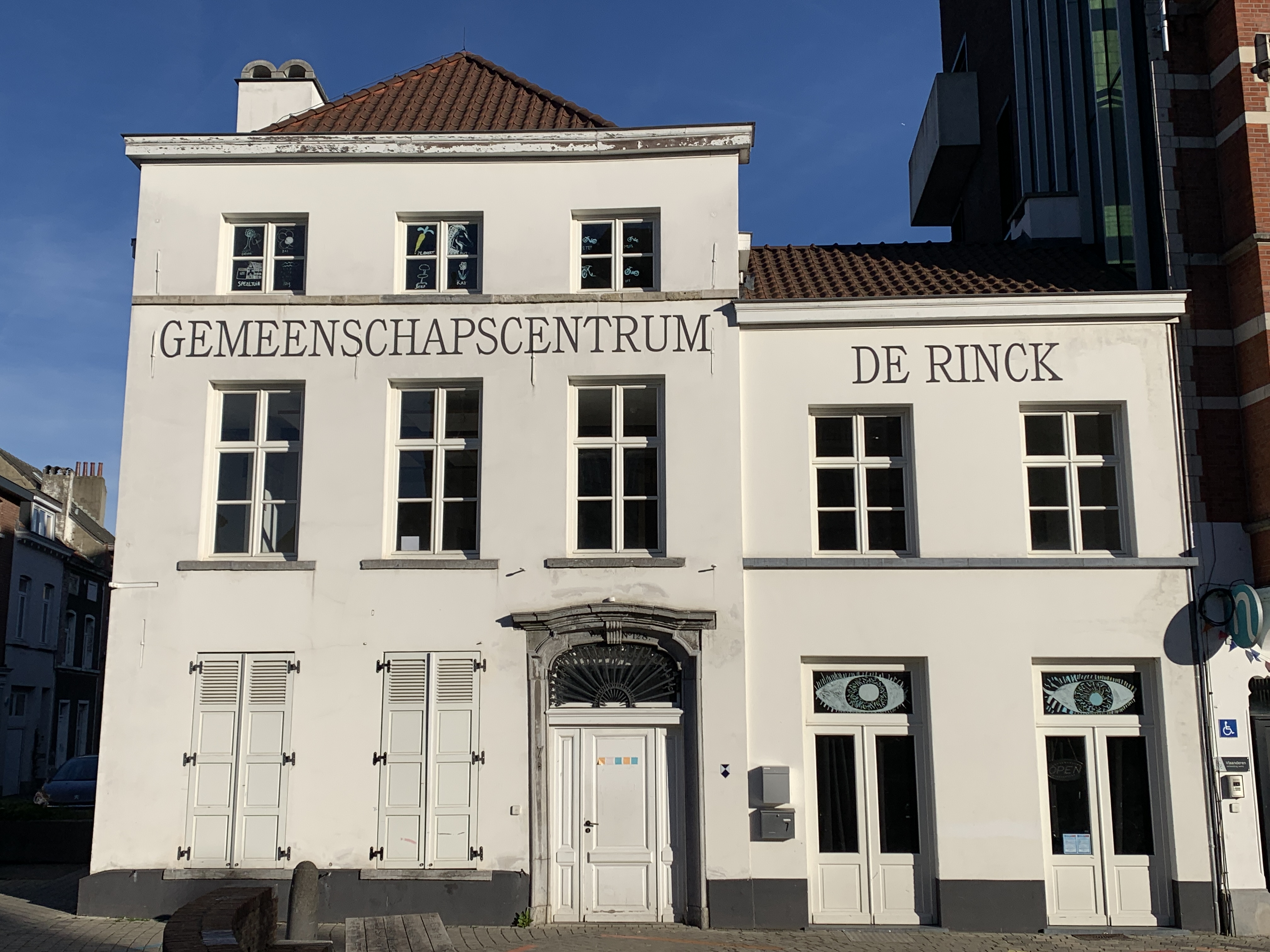
De Rinck

== See also ==
- History of Brussels
- Belgium in the long nineteenth century
