= Collegiate Church of St. Peter and St. Guido =

Collegiate church in Anderlecht, Belgium

- Collégiale Saints-Pierre-et-Guidon (French); Sint-Pieter-en-Sint-Guidokerk (Dutch)
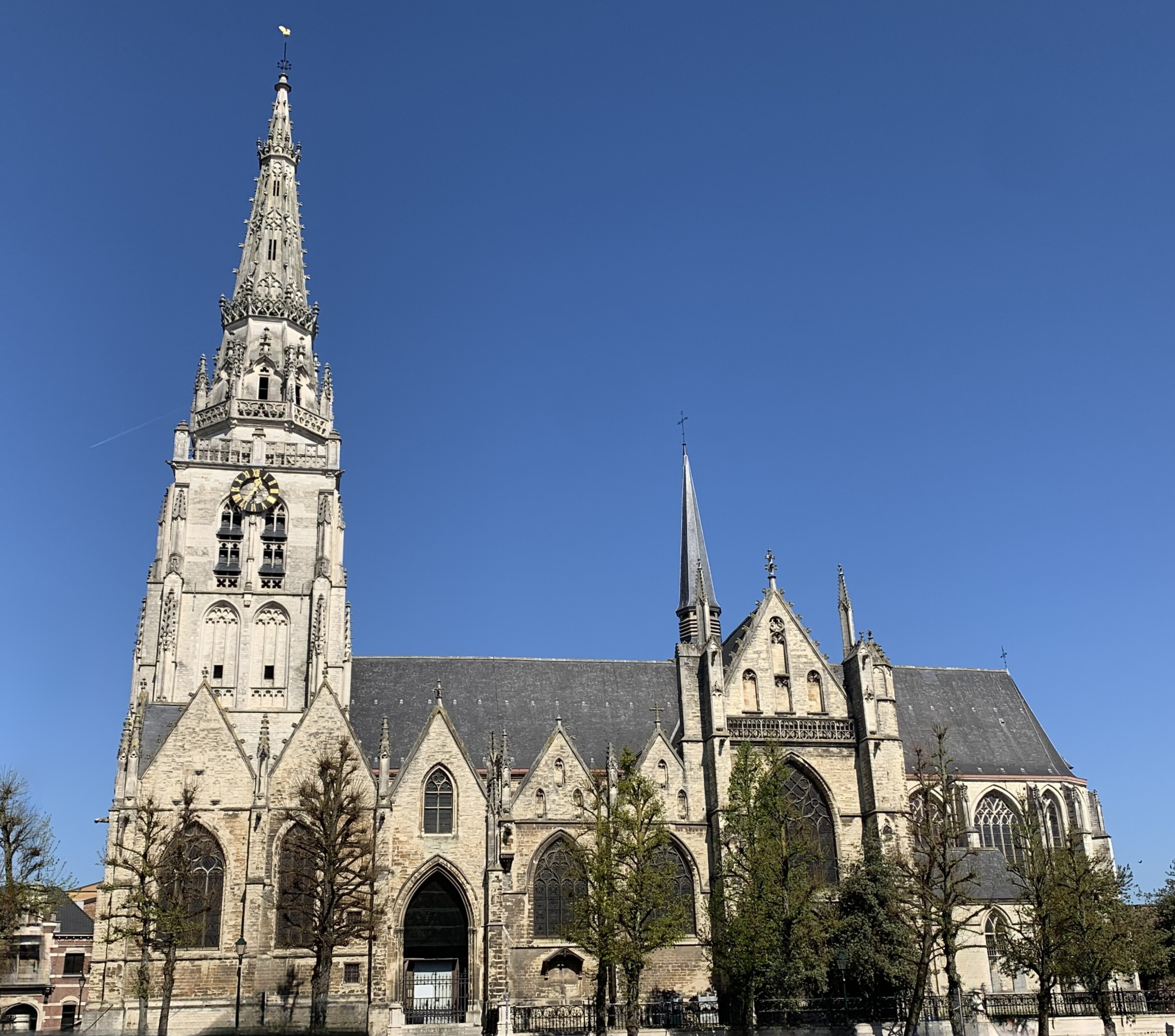
- Collegiate Church of St. Peter and St. Guido
- Collegiate Church of St. Peter and St. Guido
- 50°50′12″N 4°18′22″E
- Location: Place de la Vaillance / Dapperheidsplein; 1070 Anderlecht, Brussels-Capital Region
- Country: Belgium
- Denomination: Catholic Church

History
- Status: Collegiate church
- Dedication: Saint Peter; Saint Guy (patron saint of Anderlecht)

Architecture
- Functional status: Active
- Heritage designation: Protected
- Designated: 25/10/1938
- Architectural type: Church
- Style: Gothic; Brabantine Gothic; Gothic Revival
- Years built: 14th–16th centuries (church); 19th century (spire)
- Completed: 1898

Administration
- Archdiocese: Mechelen–Brussels

Clergy
- Archbishop: Luc Terlinden (Primate of Belgium)

The Collegiate Church of St. Peter and St. Guido (French: Collégiale Saints-Pierre-et-Guidon; Dutch: Sint-Pieter-en-Sint-Guidokerk) is a Catholic collegiate church in the historical centre of Anderlecht, a municipality of Brussels, Belgium. It is dedicated to Saint Peter and Saint Guy, the patron saint of Anderlecht.

The church, in Brabantine Gothic style, was built between the 14th and 16th centuries above an earlier Romanesque crypt. Partially attributed to the Flemish architect Jan van Ruysbroeck, it is a notable illustration of late medieval architecture in Brussels. Its neo-Gothic spire dates from the 19th century. The complex was designated a historic monument in 1938.

The church is located on the northern side of the Place de la Vaillance/Dapperheidsplein, not far from the Erasmus House, the old beguinage of Anderlecht and the Constant Vanden Stock Stadium (the municipality's main football stadium).

== History ==
=== Origins ===
The origin of the church probably goes back to the 10th and 11th centuries, or even earlier, in the form of a primitive chapel. However, no trace of this construction has survived. A chapter of canons was created shortly before 1078 near a family church dedicated to Saint Peter, then the main church of the village of Anderlecht, which had been founded in 1046 by Reinelde d'Aa, a member of an influential family of the Duchy of Brabant. This first collegiate church was in the Romanesque style, as attested by the 11th-century crypt that still exists beneath the chancel, and which was intended for the worship of relics. In this crypt lies a very old tombstone, resting on two brick pedestals, with no inscription and with only design a branch with a few leaves. A long tradition of pilgrimages consider it to be the "tomb" of Saint Guy (French: Saint Guidon, Dutch: Saint Guido), the Poor Man of Anderlecht, who died around 1012. The following centuries, this "tomb" began to attract a large number of pilgrims, eventually becoming a place of dedication for the saint.

=== Construction ===
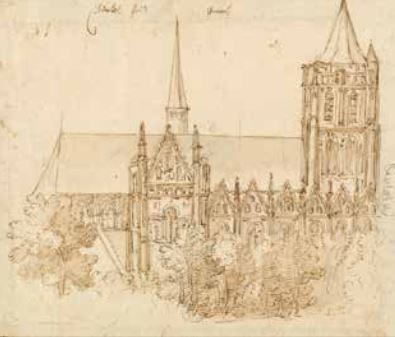
The Church of St. Guido, c. 1612, as drawn by Remigio Cantagallina

The current Brabantine Gothic building was erected in stages, mostly from around 1350 to 1527. At that time, Anderlecht was still a village on the outskirts of Brussels counting barely 300 inhabitants. Built in the centre of the village, the church was intended for gatherings much bigger than just the parish community, hence its large size. Hendrik de Mol was responsible for the works from 1443, succeeding his friend Gillis Joos. De Mol was in turn succeeded by Jan van Ruysbroeck, the court architect of Philip the Good, who also designed the tower of Brussels' Town Hall. Van Ruysbroeck mainly oversaw the construction of the choir in the 1460s. After him, Jan van Evergem took over the works in 1485, followed by his son Hendrik. The master builder Louis van Bodeghem, the architect behind the Royal Monastery of Brou at Bourg-en-Bresse, France, designed the portal. From 1517, Matthijs III Keldermans worked on the originally square tower up to the balcony and the side chapels. Construction was still underway in 1527.

=== 17th and 18th centuries ===
The cult of Saint Guy gave rise to many traditional events. Under the Ancien Régime, during Pentecost celebrations, young peasants mounted on draught horses adorned with flowers and ribbons would mingle with the pilgrims who had come to implore Saint Guy. This custom gave rise to another consisting of performing a triple gallop around the church. The winner was allowed to ride into the church to be crowned with a hat of roses and awarded a silver medal. However, this cavalcade was not without risk and was definitively abolished on 5 May 1752. The college of canons was dissolved in 1796, under the French regime, but the collegiate church kept its title.

=== 19th century–present ===
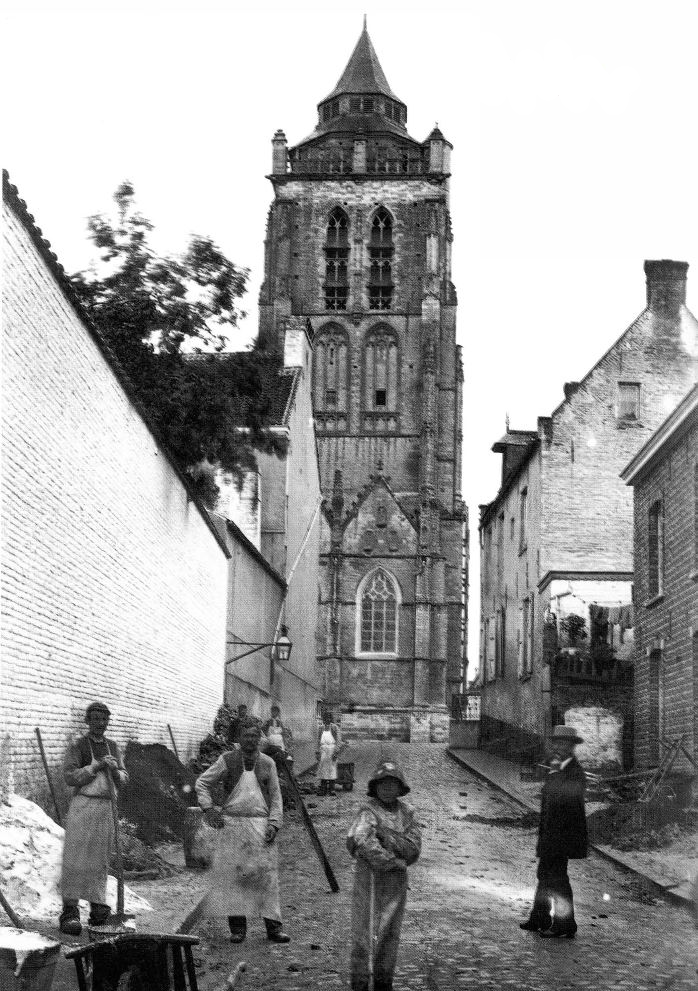
St. Guido's Church, c. 1895. Note the missing spire.

Restoration work was carried out between 1843 and 1847, under the direction of the architect Jules-Jacques Van Ysendyck, which lead to the discovery of several wall paintings from the early 15th and 16th centuries. To encourage heavy cart traffic around the church, the slope of the Broeck valley was levelled and the church was thus "raised". The seven-step staircase leading to its entrance dates from this period. In 1892, the original crypt (containing the "tomb" of Saint Guy), which had been abandoned for centuries, was restored. The reopening and solemn blessing took place on 2 September of that year. In 1898, the square tower was surmounted by a neo-Gothic octagonal spire designed by Van Ysendyck, giving the church its current appearance.

The church was designated a historic monument on 25 October 1938. During World War II, following the German invasion of Belgium (exactly from 8 March 1942), the tower was used as an observation post by the Germans to spot air attacks, fires, etc. From 1994 to 1997, the church's exterior was the subject of a new cleaning campaign, which highlighted the elegance of the building with appropriate night lighting. The contrast is now great with the interior whose walls are in great need of refreshing.

== Description ==
=== Exterior ===
Most of the church is in the Brabantine Gothic style, with most of the currently visible architecture representing the Ogee style (15th–16th centuries), although some parts are in the neo-Gothic style (19th century). It is built of stone from Avesnes (northern France), as well as the Dilbeek quarry, which is located in present-day Flemish Brabant, approximately 4 km (2.5 mi) west of the church's site.

Above the church's main portal are three statues, depicting Saint Peter, the Madonna and Child, and Saint Guy, respectively. These have since been replaced by copies, with the originals now stored inside the church. Around the choir and the tower, powerful buttresses punctuate the walls at regular intervals. They are crowned with heavy pinnacles. Two corners of the transept are marked by a turret containing a spiral staircase that gives access to the attic under the roof frame.

Visible from many points in Brussels, the spire remains a prominent feature in the city's skyline. It is the fruit of the neo-Gothic craze that developed in Belgium in the 19th century. Designed by Jules Van Ysendyck and inaugurated in 1898, it reflects the contemporary desire to glorify Belgium's national heritage, even if it meant adding to it when it was deemed incomplete. The weight of this spire, combined with the instability of the ground, now threatens the tower's stability.

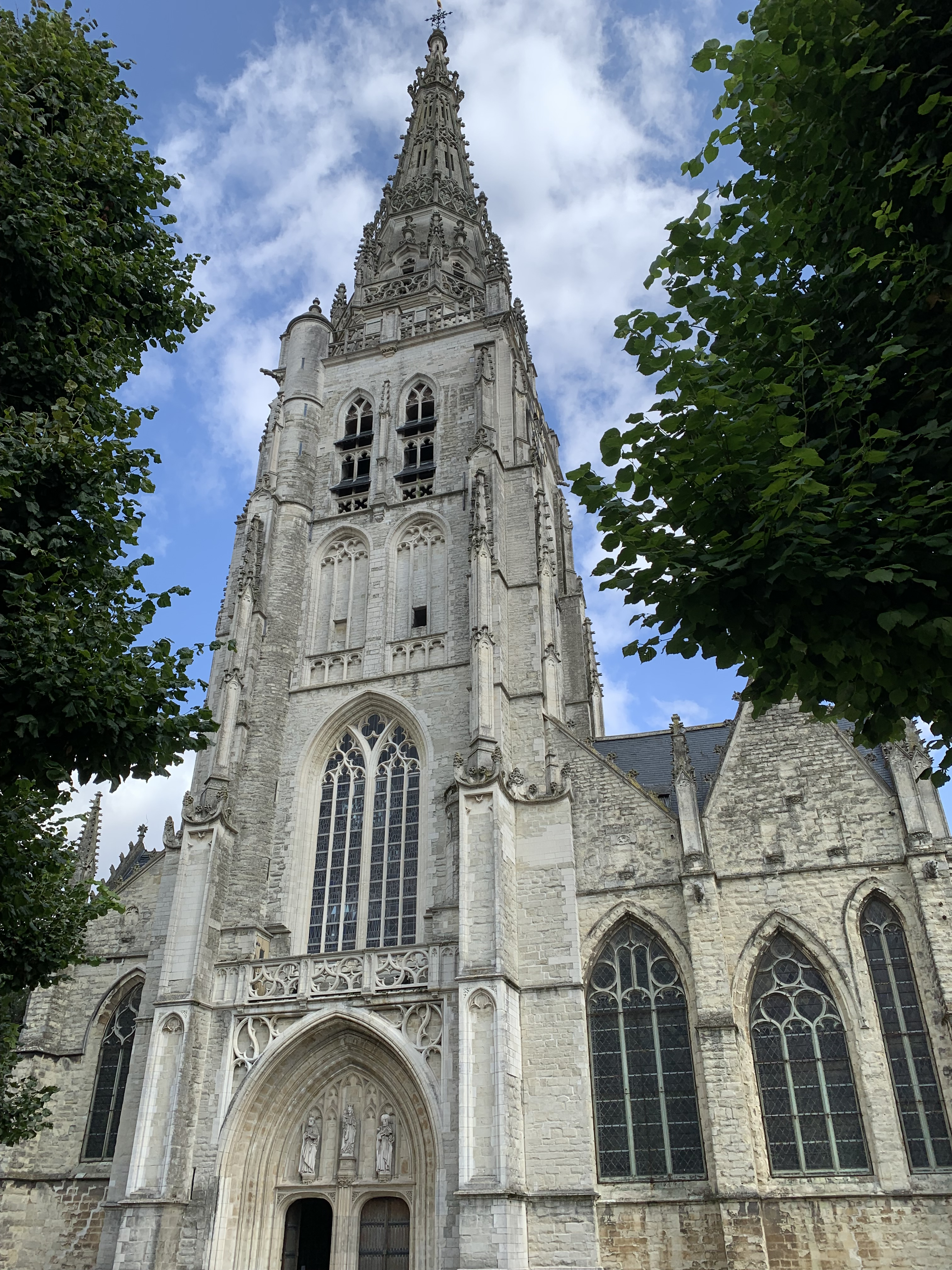
Frontal view of the tower

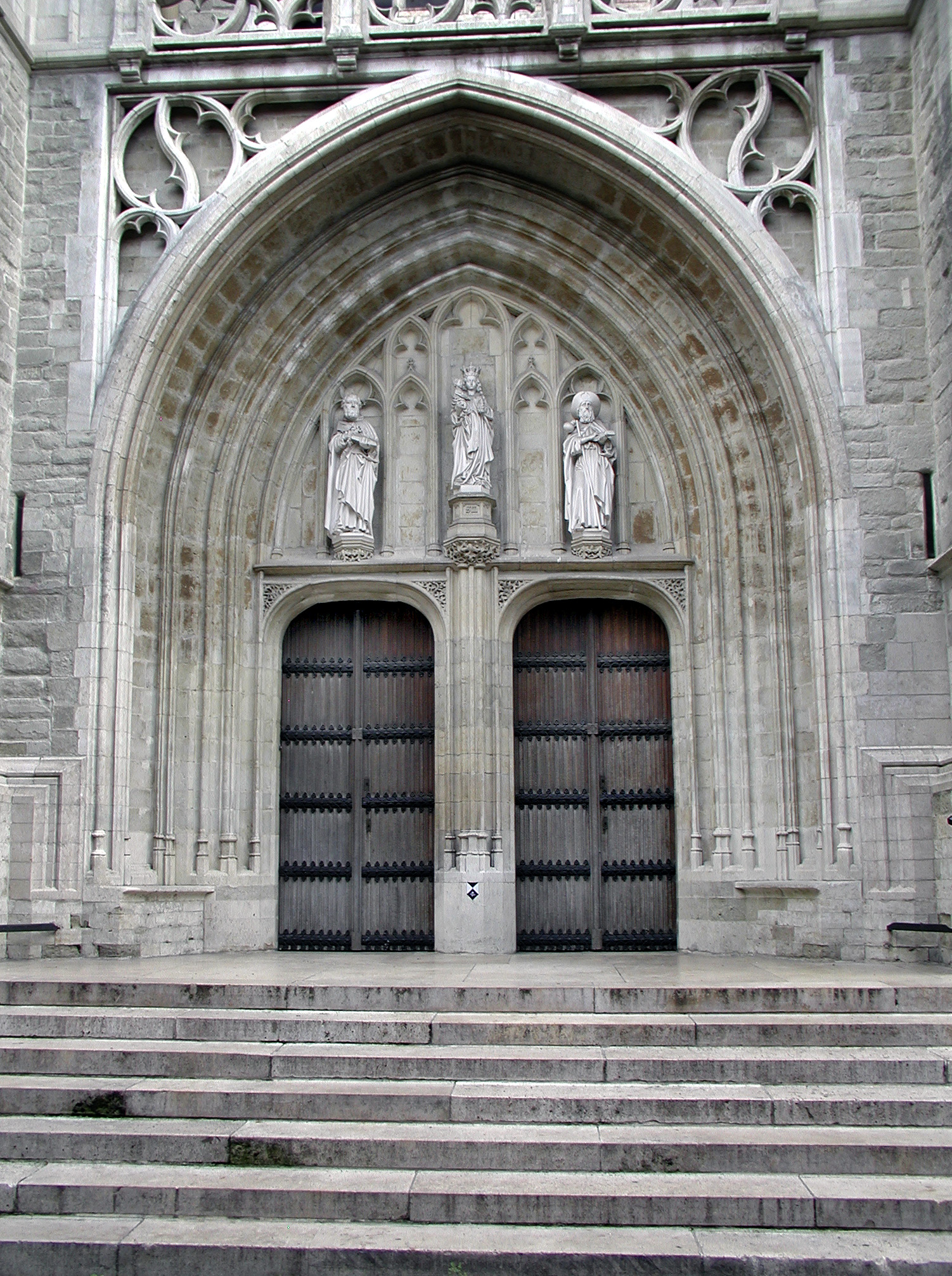
Main portal

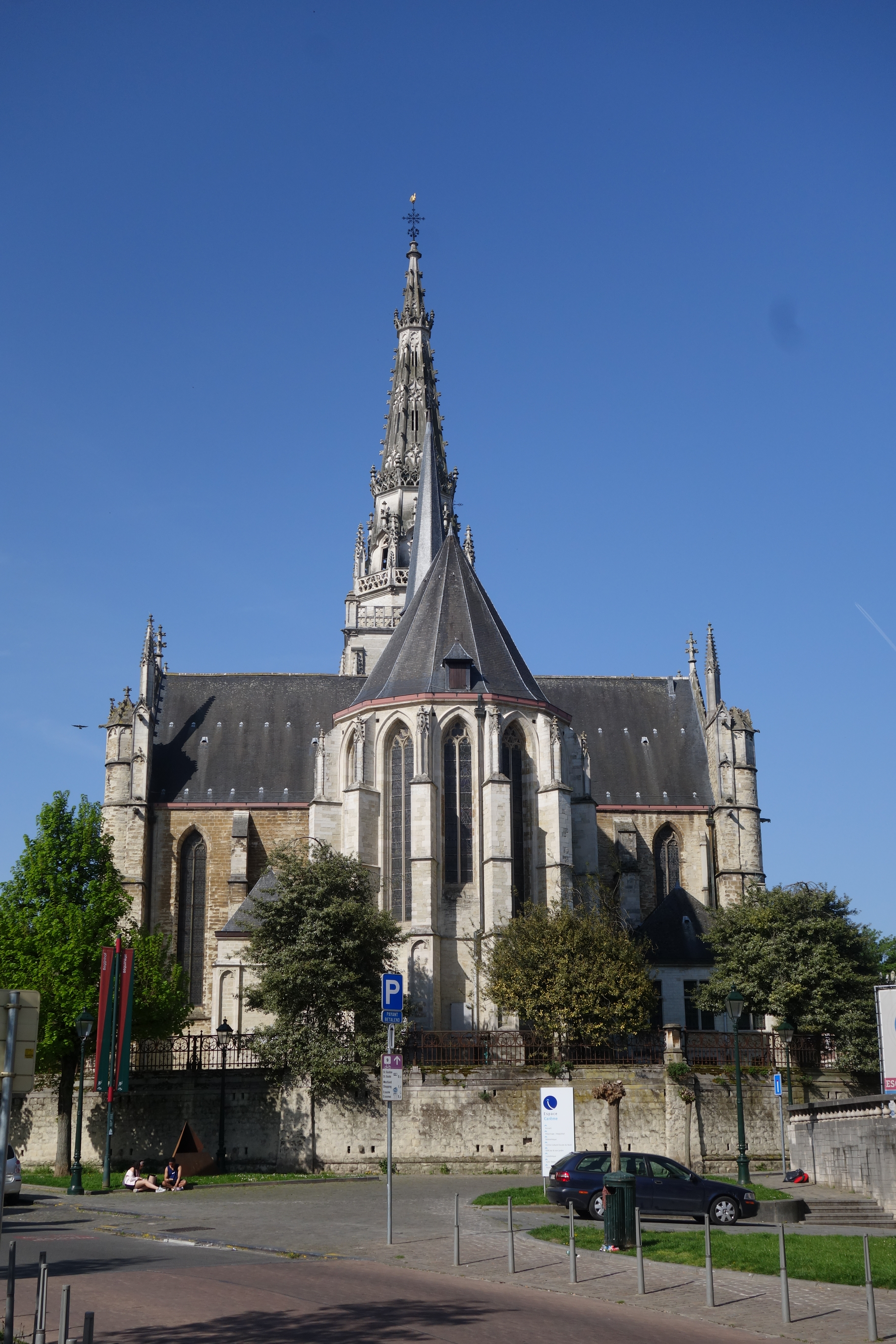
Rear view

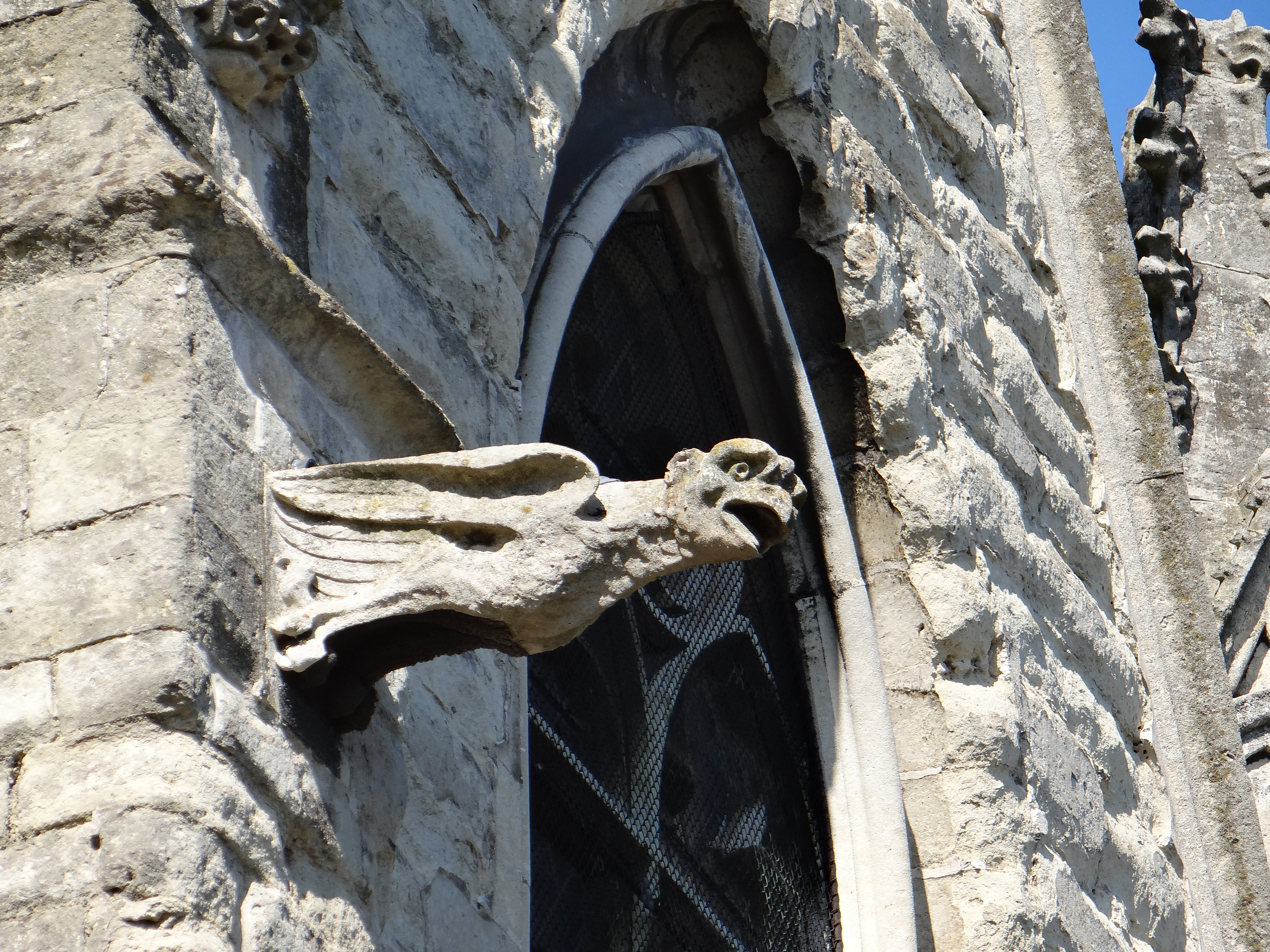
Gargoyle

=== Interior ===
The nave, shaped like a Latin cross, has only four low bays, and extends beyond the transept into the relatively deep choir (including the canons' stalls) facing east. Its three vaults are divided by cylindrical columns topped with capitals in the shape of cabbage leaves, according to the Brabantine Gothic tradition. The walls are painted with scenes depicting, among others, the life of Saint Guy, the martyrdom of Saint Erasmus, and Saint Christopher carrying the child Jesus. To the right of the right aisle is the large Chapel of Our Lady of Grace, where a 15th-century statue of the Virgin Mary (Our Lady of Grace), originally from the Carthusian Monastery in Scheut, was taken in 1783.

The two stained glass windows at the entrance to the choir, on the left and right, date from the 15th and 16th centuries, and represent respectively the Virgin and Child and the Intercession. The other windows in the church are more recent, having been installed in the 19th and 20th centuries. The one in the large window of the tower, made in 1964–65, is thought to be a representation of the Second Vatican Council of 1962.

The large neo-Gothic organ is a work by the organ-builder Georges Haupt; it has 45 stops on three manuals and pedal. The instrument was inaugurated on 4 April 1937. The inauguration concert was played by three organists: Arthur Clément (the church's organist), Jean-Marie Plum and Karel Hens. It was restored in 1975 by the organ-builder Emile Verschueren.

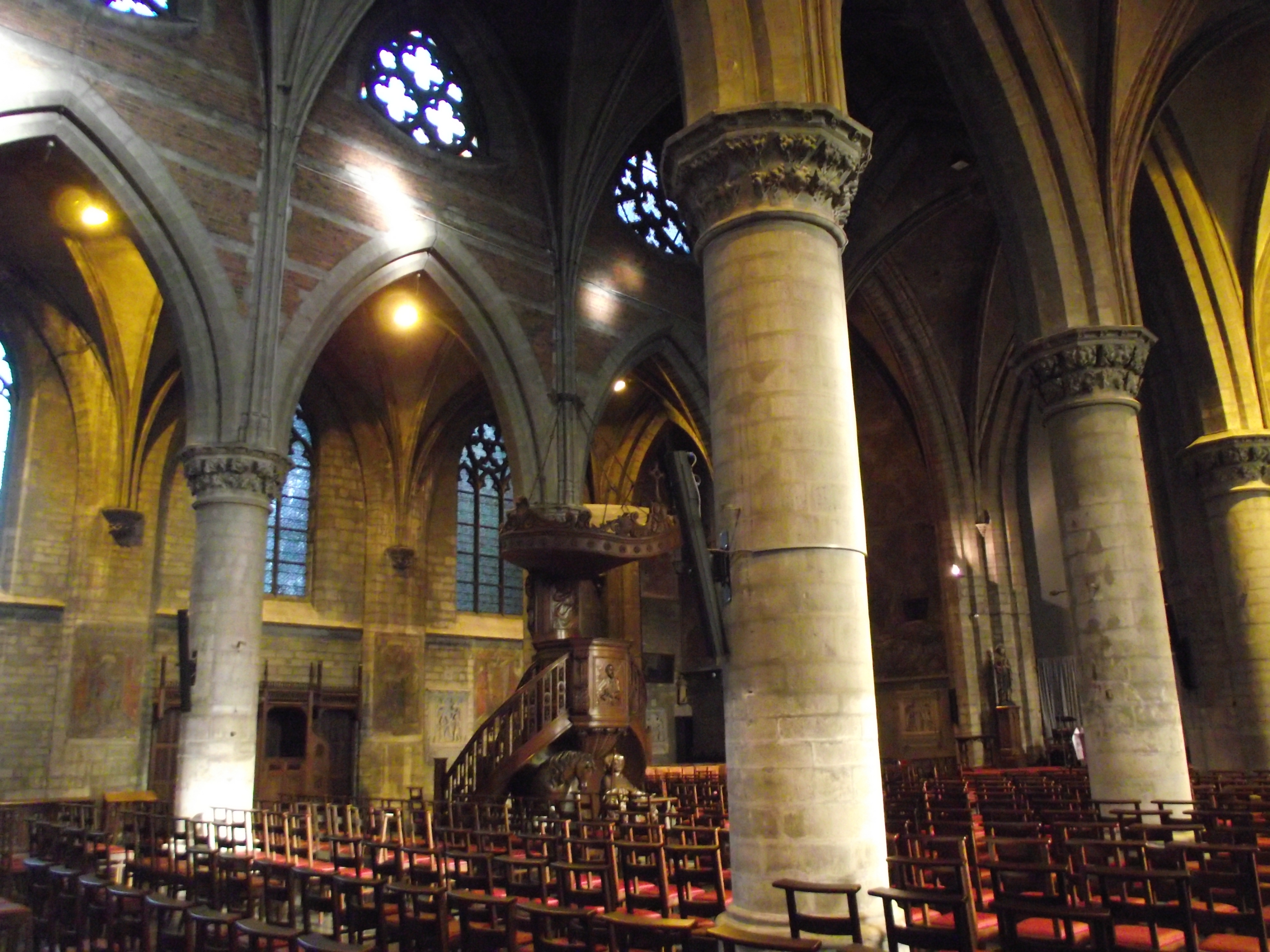
Interior

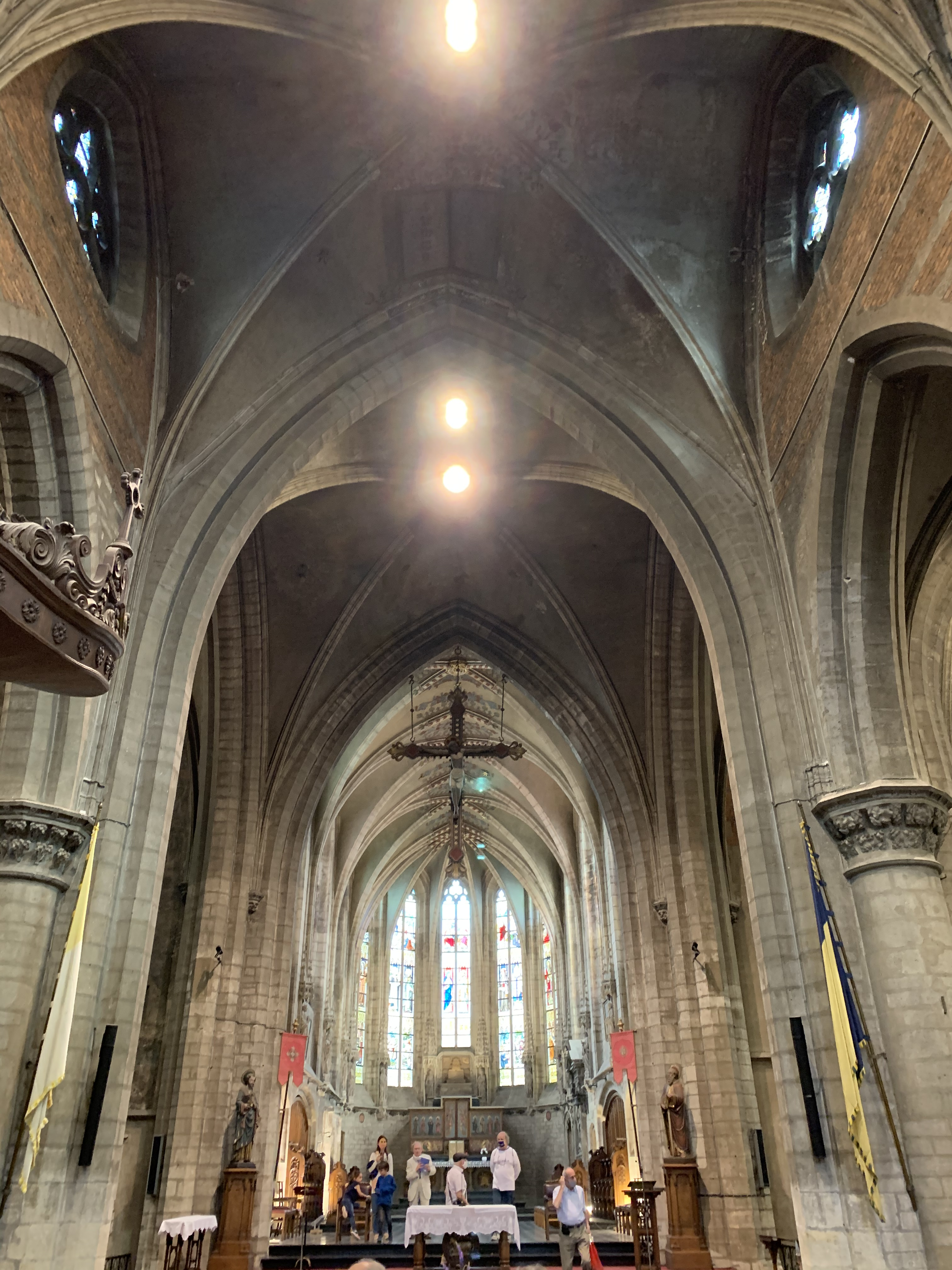
Choir

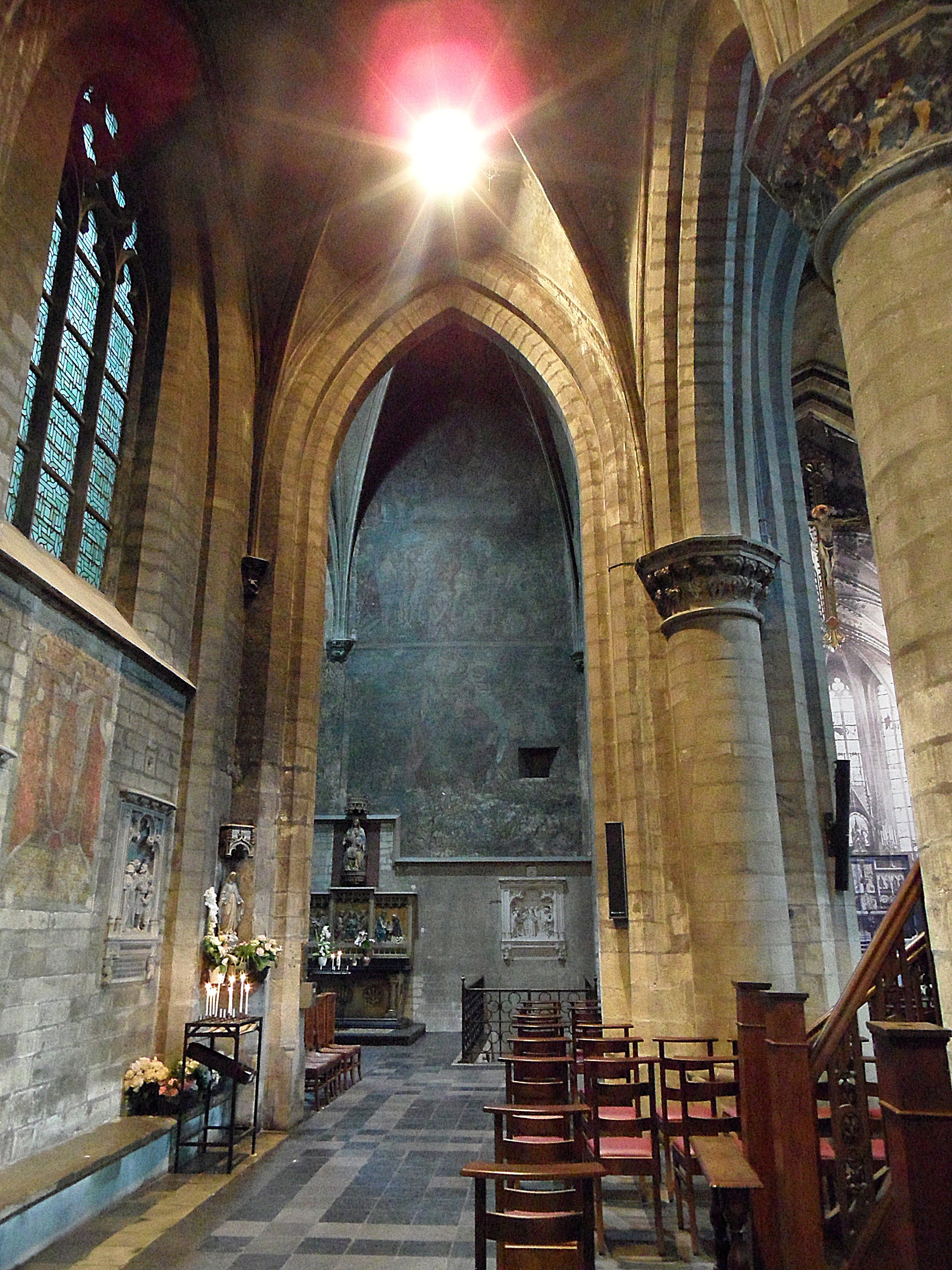
Northern aisle

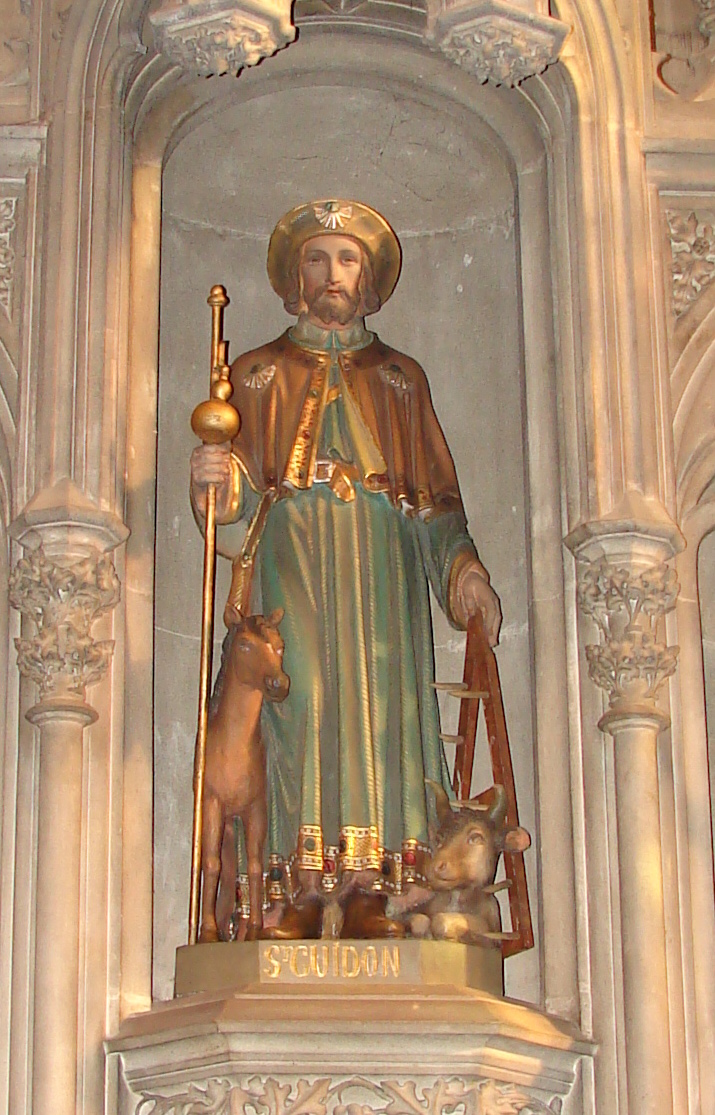
Statue of Saint Guy

=== Crypt ===
The crypt, which dates back to the first Church of St. Peter (Romanesque style), is in a good state of conservation. Half-buried, with eleven narrow windows and three naves, it ends with a three-sided chevet, which is a rarity. It is completed by two side access corridors enclosed by a straight wall pierced by a narrow daylight outlet. The arrangement of the six central columns is particularly original. The four western columns have a monolithic shaft. The nature of the stone, which is rough and slightly pinkish, lends credence to the legend that it was reused material from an ancient Roman villa, although petrographic analyses do not confirm this. The two eastern columns are built with drums, marking the transition from the crypt's nave to its chevet.

In the centre of the crypt, a trapezoidal slab decorated with a lily of life, produced by Tournaisian sculpture workshops in the late 11th century, is believed to be the "tomb" of Saint Guy. The supports of the slab leave a narrow gap through which, it is said, pilgrims had to slip in order to have their wishes and prayers granted by the saint; the wear and tear on the stones seems to support this legend.

The crypt's masonry was reinforced in the 15th century, when the current choir was built, and the 19th-century restoration gave the stones a homogeneous appearance. The altar, which dates from this restoration, was built on the site of the original altar. In the west wall of the crypt, there is still a bay that once gave access to a liturgical well associated with the cult of relics.

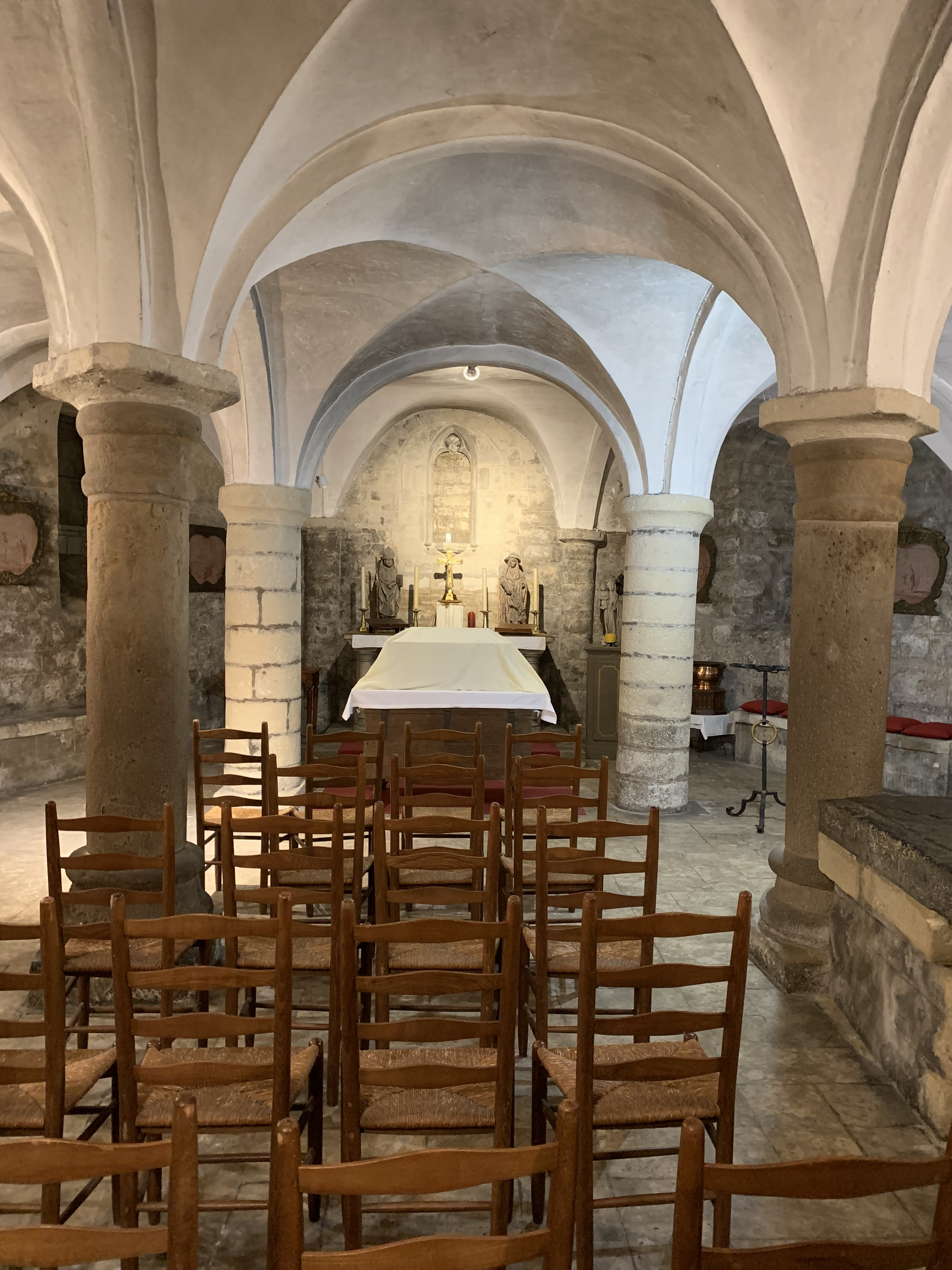
Crypt

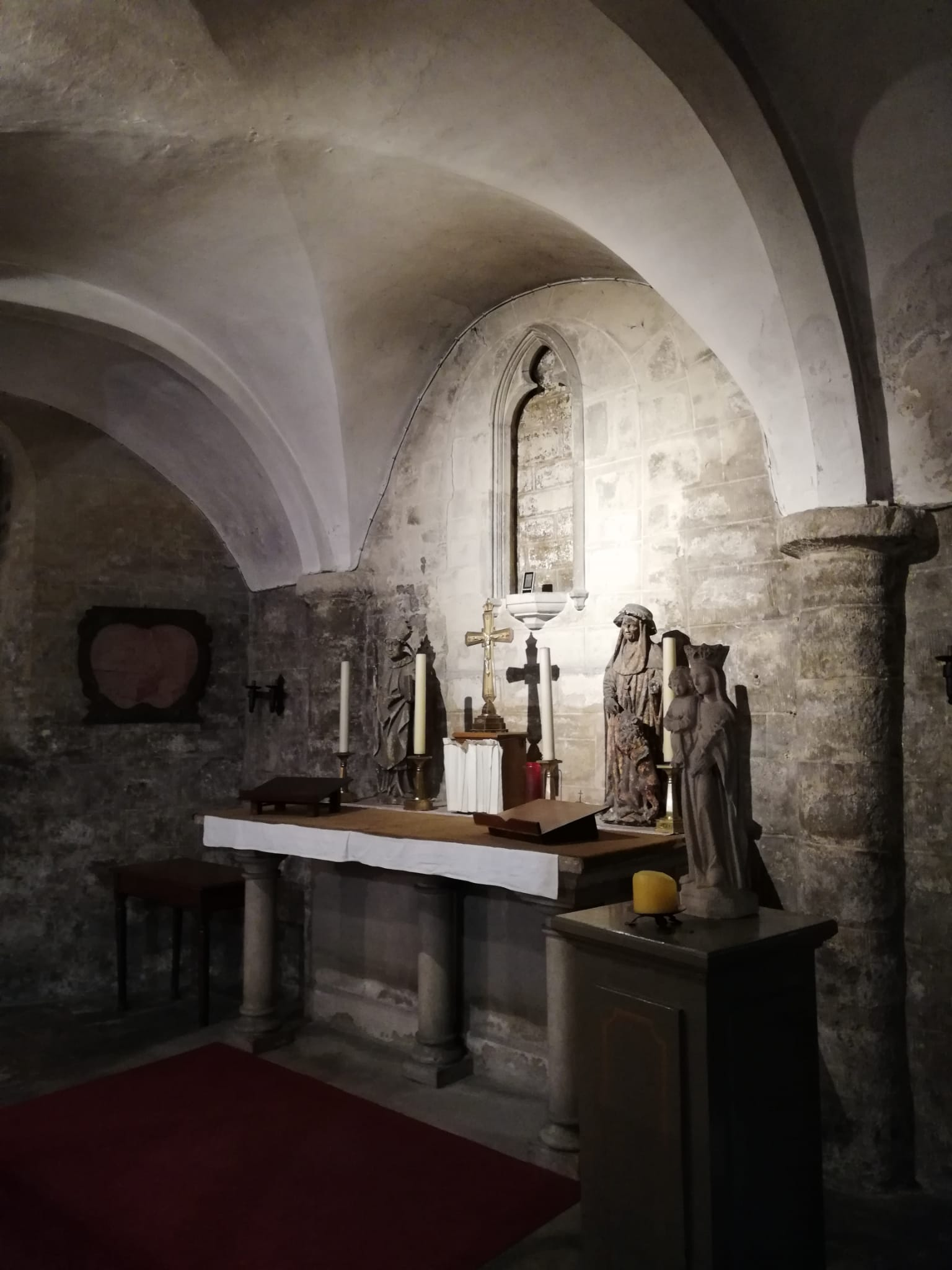
Altar of the crypt

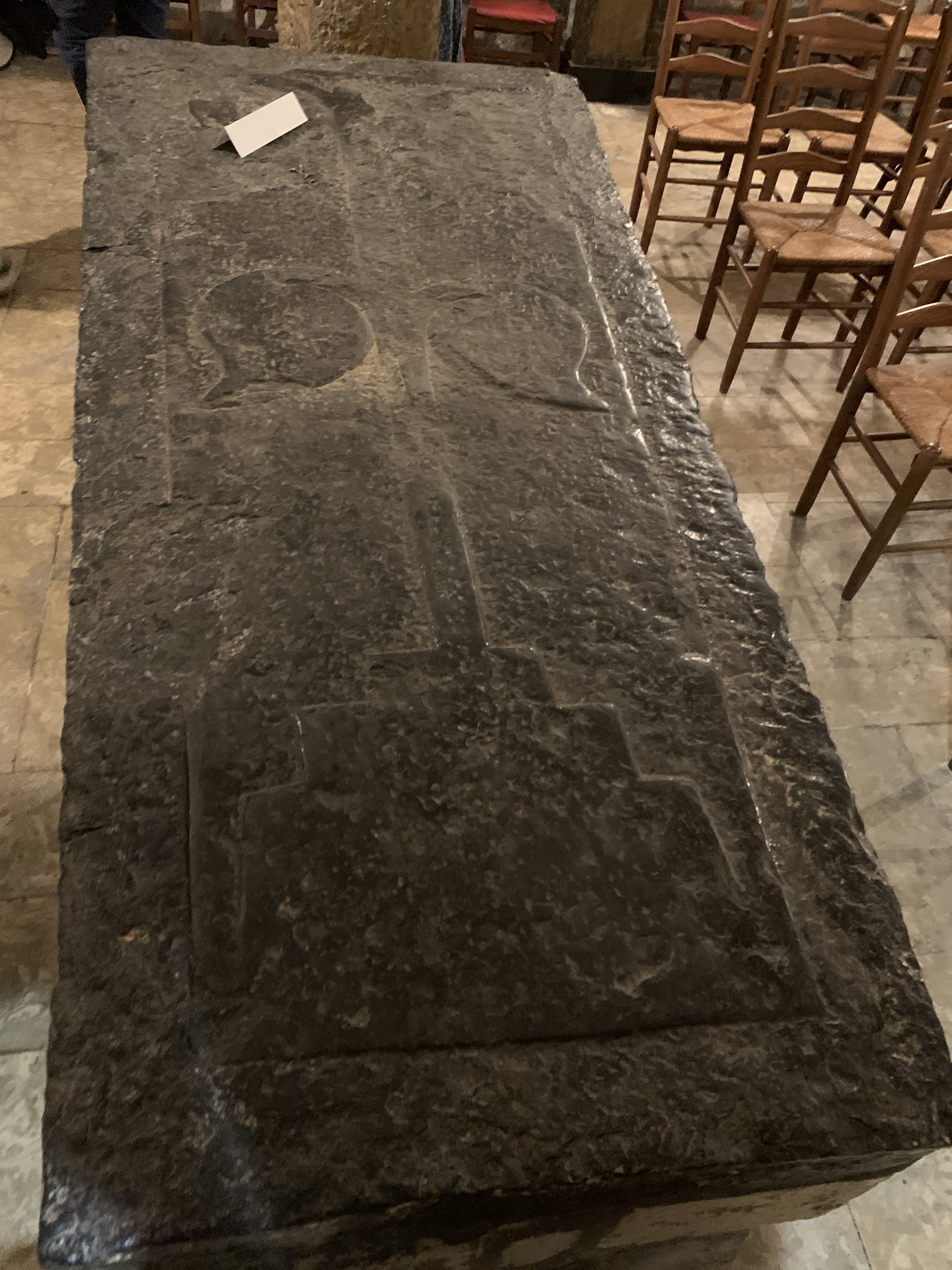
"Tomb" of Saint Guy

== Burials ==
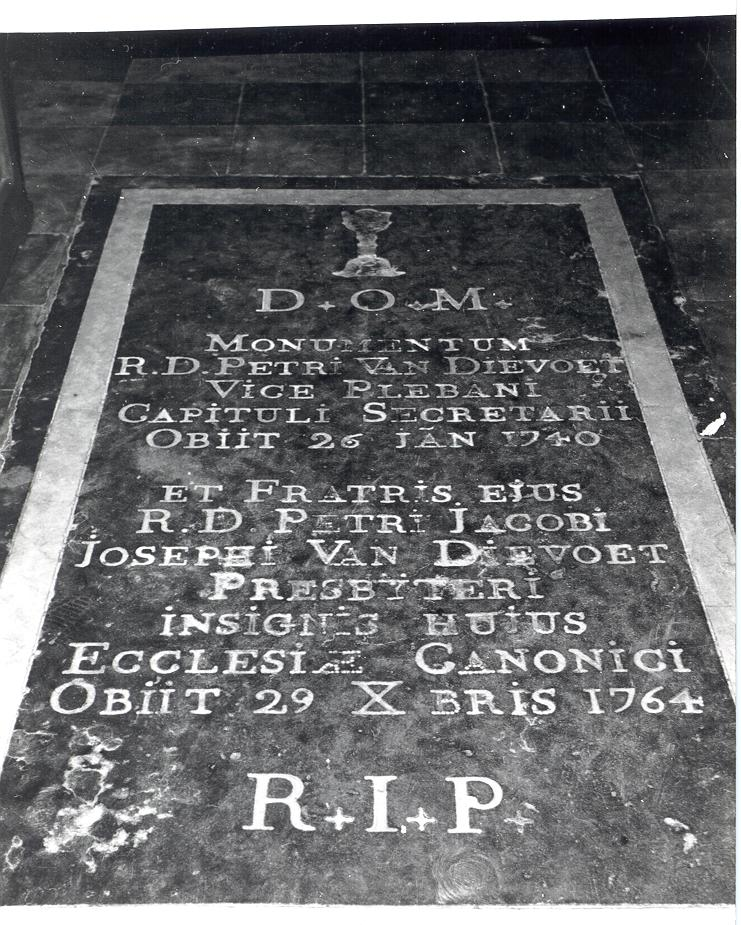
Tomb of the canons Van Dievoet

Around a hundred tombstones of canons and other illustrious people who died between the 15th and 18th centuries cover the floor of the transept, nave and aisles, amongst which:

- Peter Van Dievoet (1697–1740), vice-pleban and secretary to the chapter of Anderlecht, and his brother, canon Pierre-Jacques-Joseph van Dievoet (1706–1764);
- Jean de Catthem and his wife Elisabeth Suweels, two wealthy Brussels residents, who died in 1509 and 1515, respectively.

On the north-west side of the transept is the funerary monument of Albert Ditmar, a renowned doctor, originally from Bremen (died 1438), who was attached to the court of Brabant and was called to the bedside of Everard t'Serclaes after his attack. Next to this Gothic masterpiece, a bas-relief is striking for its small size. It commemorates Barthold de Barthoulz, who died at the age of thirteen in 1533.

To the left in the choir is the mausoleum of Jean de Walcourt, lord of Braine-le-Château, marshal of Hainaut (died 1362), among other monuments erected in memory of members of his family, heirs and descendants of the Aa family, founders of the collegiate chapter.

== See also ==
- List of churches in Brussels
- Catholic Church in Belgium
- History of Brussels
- Culture of Belgium
- Belgium in the long nineteenth century
