= Beguinage of Anderlecht =

Historic beguinage in Anderlecht, Belgium

- Béguinage d'Anderlecht (French); Begijnhof van Anderlecht (Dutch)
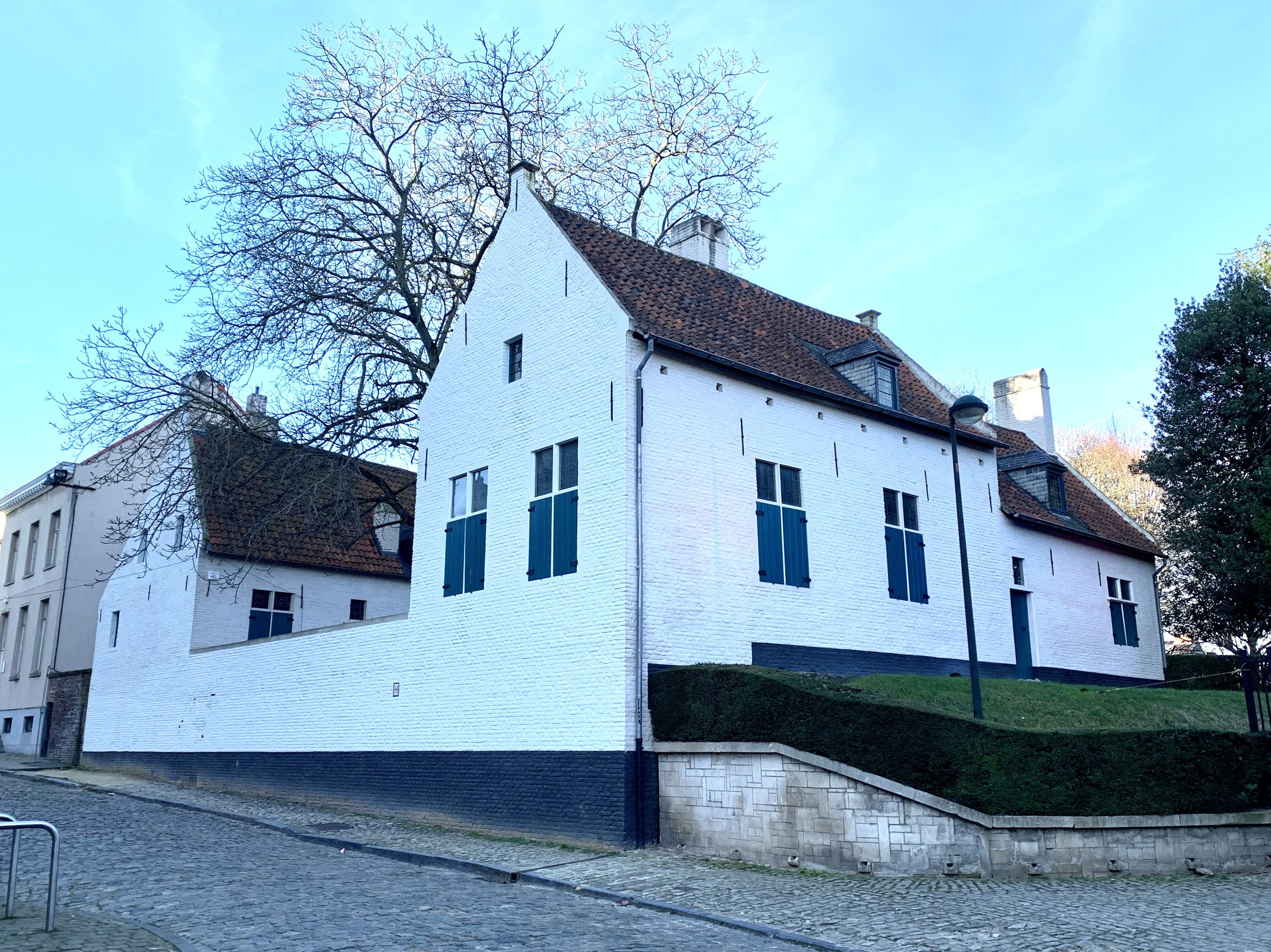
- The Beguinage of Anderlecht seen from the Rue du Chapelain/Kapelaansstraat
- Interactive map of the Beguinage of Anderlecht area
- Alternative names: Klaphuis

General information
- Type: Beguinage
- Location: Rue du Chapelain / Kapelaansstraat 8, 1070 Anderlecht, Brussels-Capital Region, Belgium
- Coordinates: 50°50′13″N 4°18′22″E
- Construction started: 13th century
- Renovated: 2020–21
- Closed: Deconsecrated in 1798
- Owner: Municipality of Anderlecht

Design and construction
- Designations: Protected (25/10/1938)

Other information
- Public transit: 5 Saint-Guidon/Sint-Guido

Website
- www.erasmushouse.museum/en

The Beguinage of Anderlecht (French: Béguinage d'Anderlecht; Dutch: Begijnhof van Anderlecht), also known as the Klaphuis, is a historic beguinage in Anderlecht, a municipality of Brussels, Belgium. Founded in the 13th century and of modest size, it housed only eight beguines from the end of the 15th century. It was suppressed during the French Revolution and abolished in 1798. Since 1930, the site has served as a museum dedicated to religious community life and local history. The complex was designated a historic monument in 1938.

The beguinage stands next to the 14th-century Collegiate Church of St. Peter and St. Guido, a Gothic church dedicated to Saint Guy of Anderlecht, who was buried there in the 11th century, as well as the Erasmus House, a late Gothic or early Renaissance style house where the Dutch humanist writer and theologian Erasmus of Rotterdam stayed in 1521. Both institutions are now managed jointly as the Erasmus House & Beguinage Museums (French: Musées Maison d'Erasme & Béguinage; Dutch: Erasmushuis & Begijnhofmusea).

== History ==
The beguinage was first mentioned in June 1252, when Guillaume, dean of the chapter of St. Peter and St. Guido in Anderlecht, acting on behalf of the church, endowed a local community of beguines (Latin: humili Conventui begginarum de Anderlecht) with a plot of land, half sold and half leased. This land, gradually forming the current complex, lay north of the collegiate church, along the southern slope of the Broeck valley, between the churchyard and the stream's banks. The charter suggests that this was not a strict foundation, but rather a formalisation of an existing, informal beguine community placed under the chapter's supervision, shortly after the foundation of a beguinage in Brussels in March 1250. The act also specified that the land included a former house and that the chapter's protection would extend to future houses the beguines would establish there.

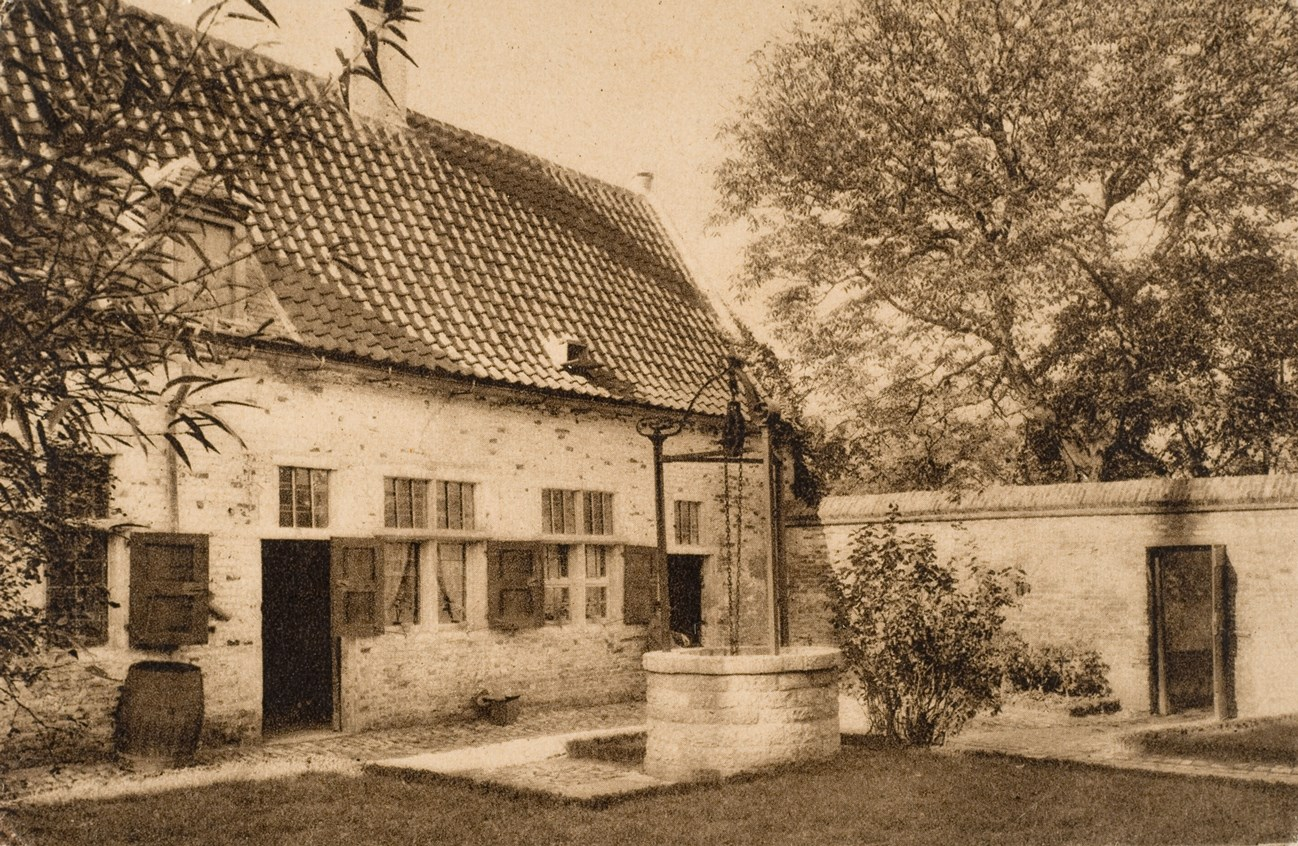
Courtyard of the Beguinage of Anderlecht in the early 20th century

The Anderlecht community was led by a Great Lady. Although the beguines did not take perpetual vows, they observed chastity and obedience, allowing them to live in relative freedom while actively participating in religious life. They were valued for caring for the sick, accompanying the dying, and teaching poor children. As tensions arose between certain beguinages and ecclesiastical authorities over autonomy, in 1311, it was decided that the Brabant beguines would be placed under direct papal supervision, confirmed by Pope John XXII in 1318. Archaeological evidence from a 1996 survey in the garden of the neighbouring presbytery uncovered abundant ceramic material dating roughly to the 14th–15th centuries, providing some insight into the material life of the community.

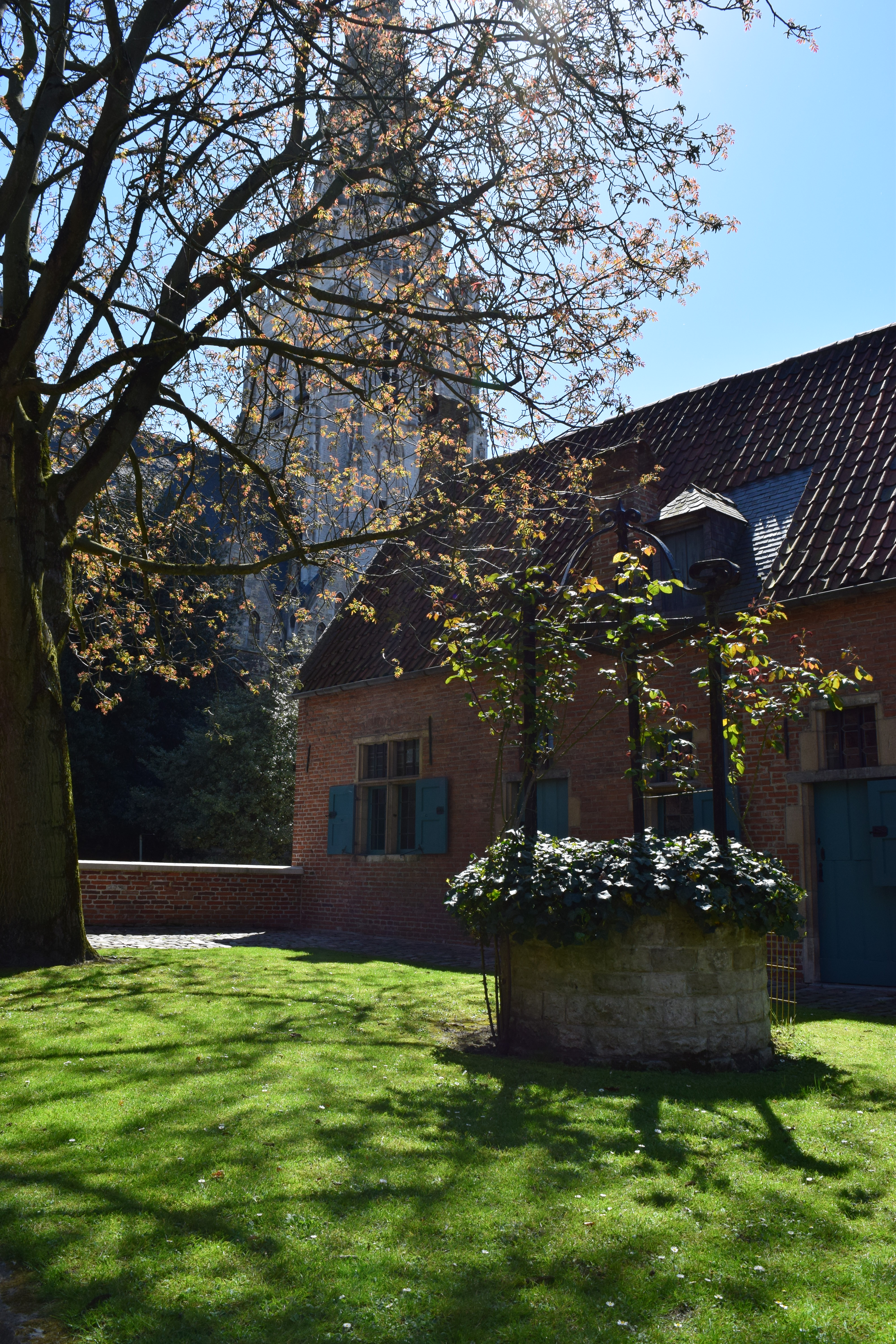
Courtyard of the beguinage with the Collegiate Church of St. Peter and St. Guido in the background

The first preserved statutes of the beguinage date to 1611, likely replacing or partially continuing earlier medieval regulations. They stipulated that eight women of "respectable" age and conduct could reside there, electing a superior or mistress with the chapter's approval. Residents paid a modest admission fee, were required to live on-site, attend mass, and participate in matins on Sundays and feast days. The statutes also regulated dress and spiritual discipline, including prayers for benefactors, and assigned each woman a small kitchen garden. The beguines mainly served the chapter and parish, maintaining liturgical vestments and altar fabrics, acting as domestic assistants to canons or clerics, producing lace, and tending the sick or teaching. In the 1780s, Isabelle de Wit, one of the beguines, began teaching poor girls in Anderlecht, but faced resistance from the local schoolmaster; after years of legal proceedings, she was ultimately vindicated.

The French Revolution brought an end to the institution in 1794, and it was formally suppressed in 1798, with its property confiscated and transferred to the municipal charity office. Nevertheless, the site continued to function as a local charity office and accommodation for indigent women. In 1930, a museum was established to present the beguines' daily lives and the history of Anderlecht. The beguinage was classified as a historic monument on 25 October 1938. Over the years, the museum underwent several closures and restorations, including a major intervention in the 1970s to address structural stability issues. Most recently, it was restored in 2020–21 and is scheduled to reopen in 2025 with updated exhibitions.

== Architecture ==
=== Exterior ===
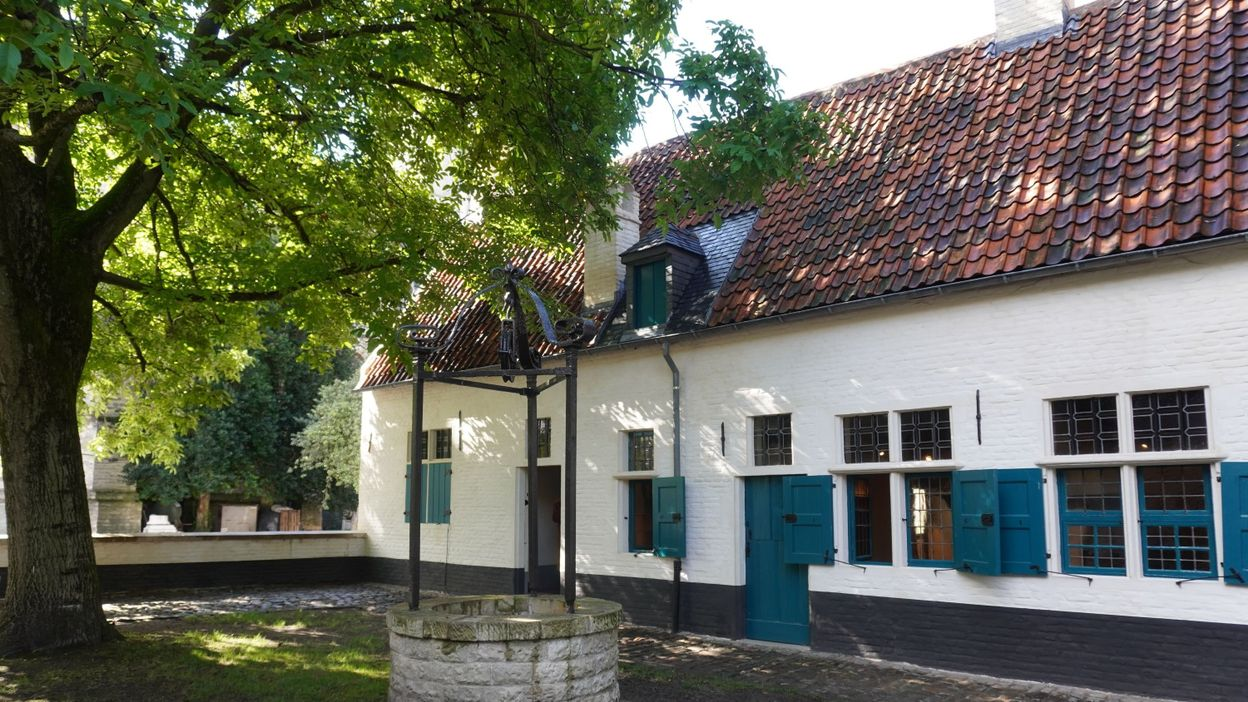
Exterior of the beguinage after the 2020–21 restoration

The beguinage originally consisted of two houses arranged around a walled courtyard, located north of the Collegiate Church of St. Peter and St. Guido. The complex frames a courtyard that opens onto the Rue du Chapelain/Kapelaansstraat to the south and is enclosed to the north by a boundary wall with an entrance porch. The current slope of the Rue du Chapelain results from 19th-century excavation work; historically, the old path was likely at a level similar to that of the courtyard, allowing direct access to the church from the south. The site is bordered to the west by gardens, now attached to the neighbouring building, and to the north and east by land belonging to the Bibliothèque de l'Espace Maurice Carême French-language public library.

The general appearance of the buildings is "traditional", reflecting the combined use of brick and stone. The west wing retains significant remains of a timber-framed house constructed between the 1430s and 1460s and enlarged around 1510–1514, while the east wing, sometimes called the "House of the Great Lady", was largely rebuilt in 1720–21. A smaller east building was added in the mid-18th century. Unlike larger Flemish urban beguinages, Anderlecht's enclosure is modest in scale but historically significant within the local community.

=== Interior ===
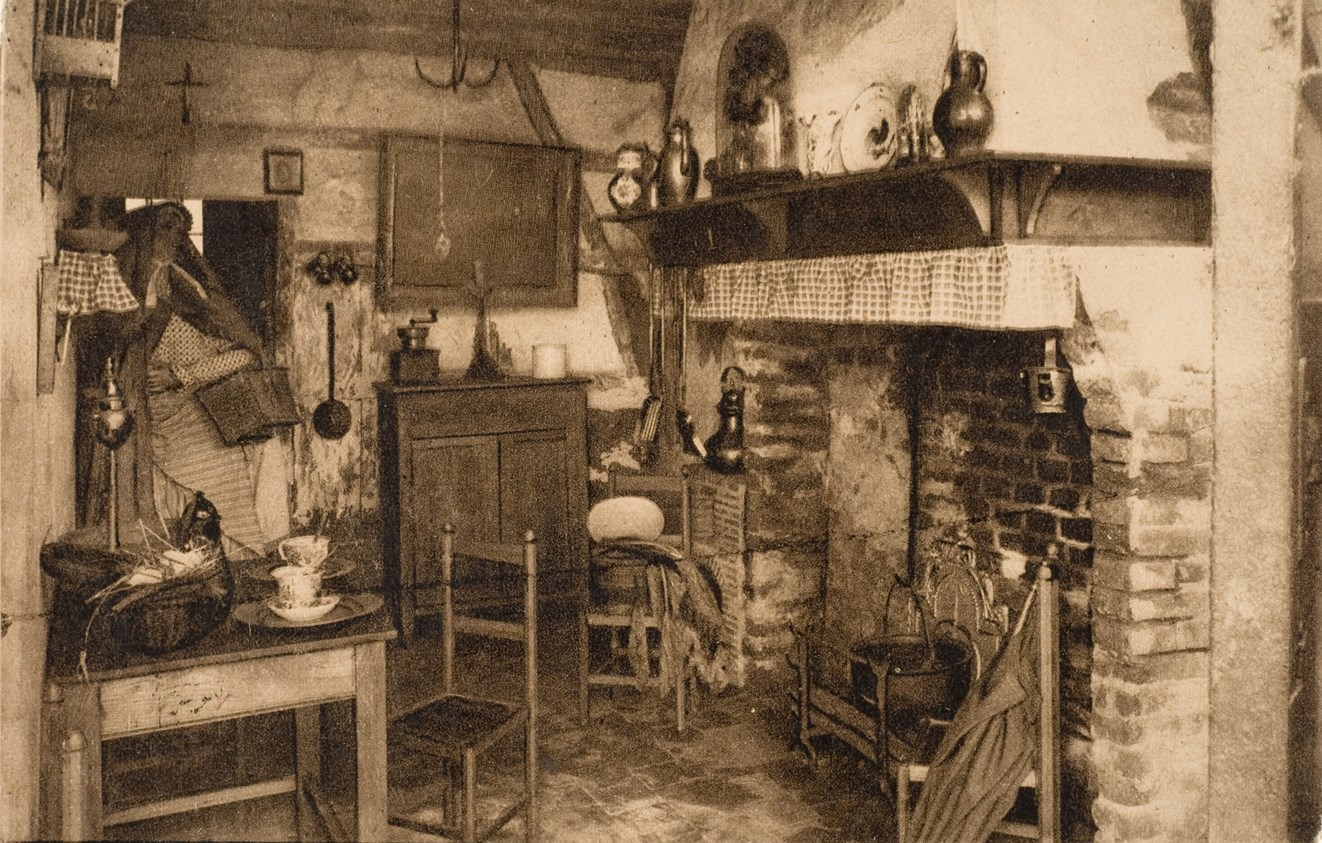
Interior of the beguinage, c. 1900

The interior of the west wing preserves elements of the original half-timbered structure, including roof trusses, the gable, and several partitions. Archaeological and dendrochronological studies conducted between 2010 and 2011 identified the timber species and condition, providing insight into 15th- and 16th-century construction methods and the forest cover of the Brussels region at the time. Laboratory analyses of cob and roofing materials further clarified the composition and manufacturing techniques used.

Despite extensive restoration in the 1970s, which removed some historical features without detailed documentation, the site still retains significant structural information. Observations reveal developments spanning from the 15th to the 17th centuries in the west building, with later alterations accompanying the construction of the east wing at the end of the 17th century. These features, alongside the archaeological findings, make the Anderlecht Beguinage an important example of a modest, small-scale beguinage in contrast to the large urban enclosures more commonly associated with World Heritage status.

== See also ==
- List of museums in Brussels
- Catholic Church in Belgium
- History of Brussels
- Culture of Belgium
