= Guy of Anderlecht =

Belgian Christian saint (ca. 950–1012)

Saint Guy of Anderlecht
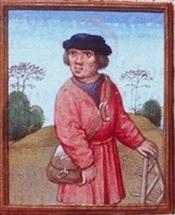
- Saint Guy of Anderlecht depicted as a pilgrim in a Book of Hours, c. 1484-1529

The Poor Man of Anderlecht
- Born: c. 950; Laken, Lower Lorraine, Holy Roman Empire
- Died: 1012 (age 62); Anderlecht, Duchy of Lower Lorraine, Holy Roman Empire
- Venerated in: Roman Catholic Church; Eastern Orthodox Church
- Major shrine: Church of St Peter and St Guido
- Feast: 12 September
- Attributes: A peasant praying with an angel plowing a nearby field; a pilgrim with a book or with a hat, staff, rosary, and an ox at his feet
- Patronage: Anderlecht; against mad dogs; against rabies; bachelors; epileptics; horned animals; labourers; protection of outbuildings, stables, and sheds; sacristans; work horses

Guy of Anderlecht, also known as Saint Guidon (or Guido, Guy and Wyen of Láken) (ca. 950–1012) was a Christian saint who is venerated in Catholic and Orthodox churches. He was known as the Poor Man of Anderlecht.

== Life and legend ==
Born to poor parents, Guy lived a simple agricultural life until the age of fourteen, when he became assistant sacristan at the Sanctuary of Our Lady in Laeken, where his duties included sweeping the church, dressing the altars, taking care of the vestments and altar linens, ringing the bell for mass and vespers, and providing flowers and other decorations which were used in that church.

He shared his meager wages with the poor, and went to Brussels, having been persuaded by a merchant that he could earn more to give to the poor. Eventually, he became a trader on the river Senne. When the boat carrying the cargo he was responsible for sank, Guy believed he was being punished by God for being greedy and went on a pilgrimage, first to Rome as penance, and then to Jerusalem where he spent seven years visiting the holy places. On his return, he met in Rome, Wondulf, dean of the church of Anderlecht, and although not in robust health himself, agreed to guide the dean and his party on their pilgrimage to the Holy Land. During this second visit, Wondulf fell ill. He asked Guy to report his death in Anderlecht and gave him his gold ring to present as proof. Guy returned alone seriously ill. On 12 September 1012, he died in Anderlecht of dysentery.

== Veneration ==
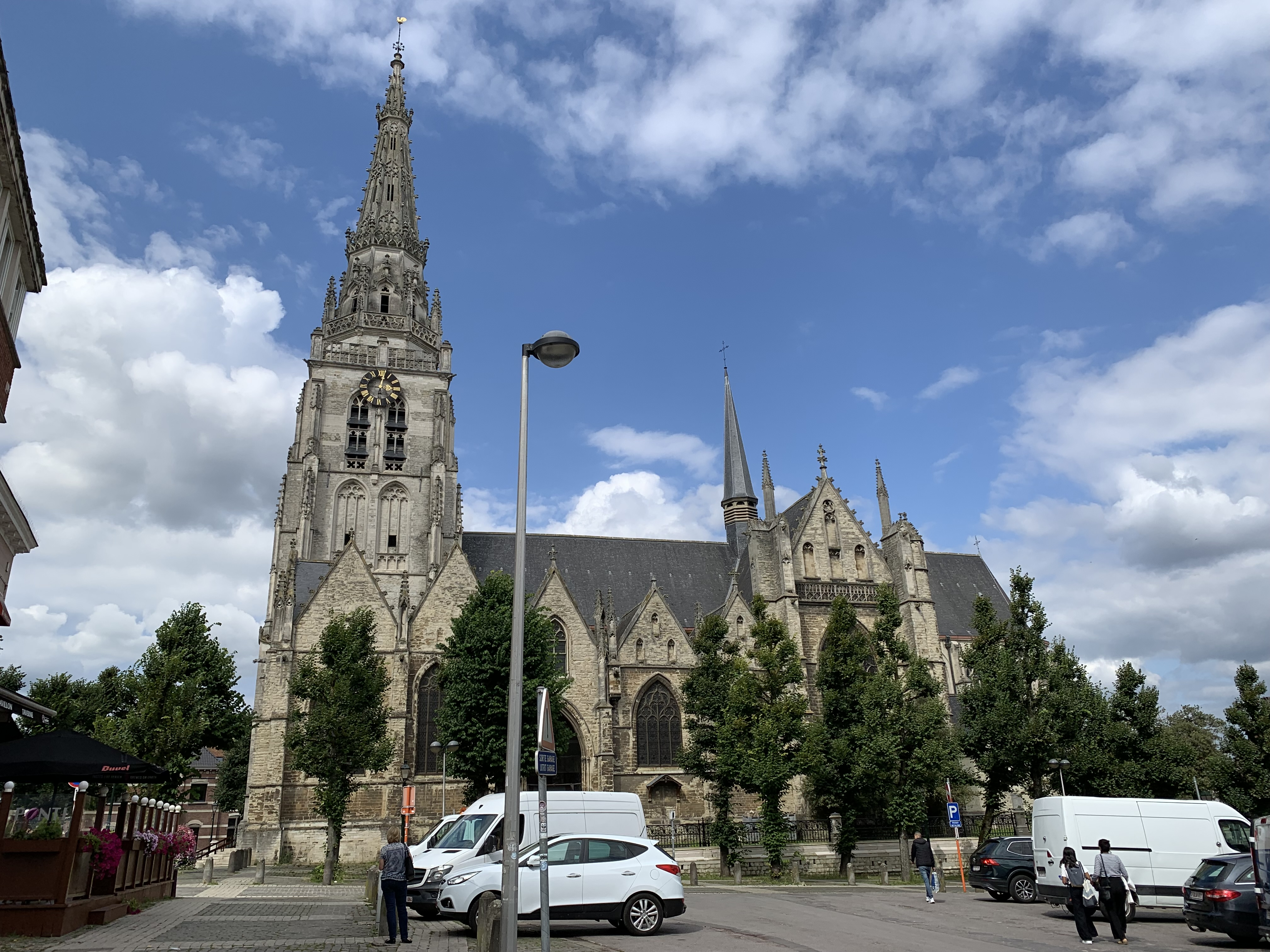
View of the Collegiate Church of St. Peter and St. Guido in Anderlecht

Saint Guy is the patron saint of Anderlecht, horned animals, bachelors, epileptics, labourers, protection of outbuildings, sheds and stables, sacristans, sextons, work horses; and is invoked against epilepsy, rabies, infantile convulsions, and mad dogs. In iconography, he is represented as a peasant praying with an angel ploughing a nearby field or as a pilgrim with a book or a hat, staff, rosary, and an ox at his feet.

Saint Guy's grave was said to have been found when a horse kicked it. Cabdrivers of Brabant led an annual pilgrimage to Anderlecht until the beginning of World War I in 1914. They and their horses headed the procession followed by farmers, grooms, and stable boys, all leading their animals to be blessed. The village fair that ended the religious procession was celebrated by various games, music, and feasting, followed by a competition to ride the carthorses bareback. The winner entered the church on bareback to receive a hat made of roses from the parish pastor.

The Collegiate Church of St. Peter and St. Guido in Anderlecht, which contains a "tomb" considered to be that of Saint Guy in its crypt, is dedicated in his honour.

== Sources ==
- Dedobbeleer, Annick; Heureux, Cécile (2012). La collégiale des Saints-Pierre-et-Guidon (PDF). Pas à pas (in French). Brussels: Tourisme Anderlecht.
- Thomas, Bernadette; Vanden Branden, Jean-Pierre; De Waha, Michel (1999). Anderlecht. Bruxelles, ville d'Art et d'Histoire (in French). Vol. 8. Brussels: Éditions de la Région de Bruxelles-Capitale.
