= Étangs Noirs metro station =

Metro station in Brussels, Belgium

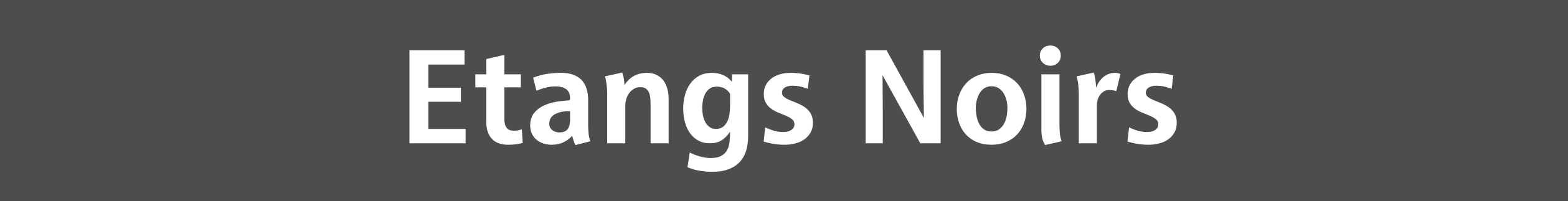
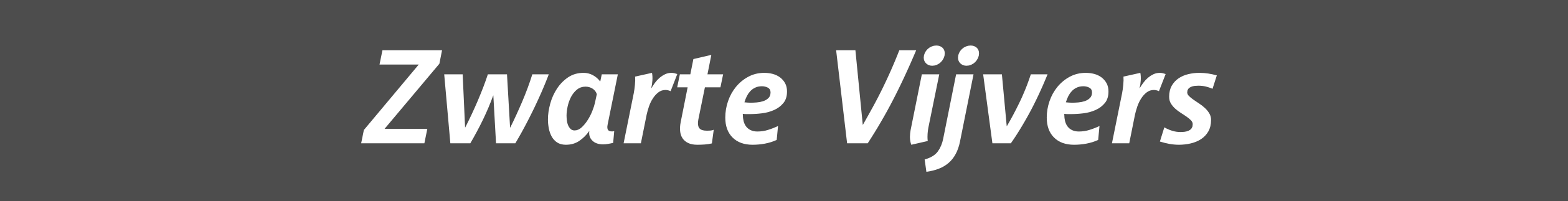

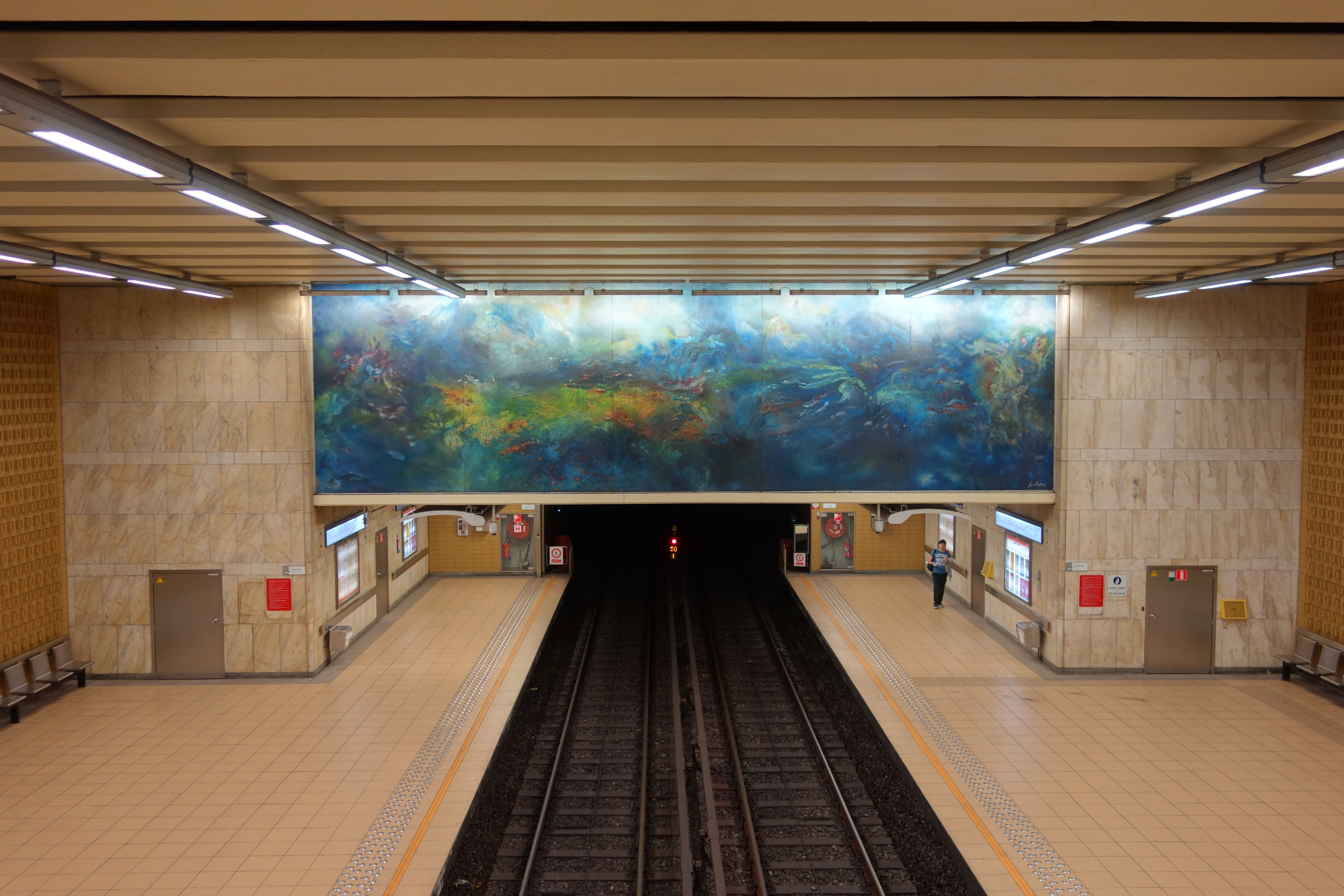
- Étangs Noirs/Zwarte Vijvers metro station

General information
- Location: Place des Étangs Noirs / Zwarte Vijversplein; 1081 Koekelberg, Brussels-Capital Region, Belgium
- Coordinates: 50°51′25″N 4°19′57″E
- Owner: STIB/MIVB
- Platforms: 2
- Tracks: 2

Construction
- Structure type: Underground
- Accessible: Yes

History
- Opened: 8 May 1981; 45 years ago

Services
Preceding station	Brussels Metro	Following station
Beekkant towards Gare de l'Ouest/Weststation	Line 1	Comte de Flandre/Graaf van Vlaanderen towards Stockel/Stokkel
Beekkant towards Erasme/Erasmus	Line 5	Comte de Flandre/Graaf van Vlaanderen towards Herrmann-Debroux
Location

Étangs Noirs (French, pronounced [etɑ̃ nwaʁ]) or Zwarte Vijvers (Dutch, pronounced [ˈzʋɑrtə ˈvɛivərs]) is a Brussels Metro station on lines 1 and 5. It is located at the border between the municipalities of Koekelberg and Molenbeek-Saint-Jean, in the western part of Brussels, Belgium. The station's name translates into English as "Black Ponds".

The metro station opened on 8 May 1981 as part of the Sainte-Catherine/Sint-Katelijne–Beekkant extension of former east–west line 1 (further split in 1982 into former lines 1A and 1B). Then, following the reorganisation of the Brussels Metro on 4 April 2009, it now lies on the joint section of east–west lines 1 and 5.

== See also ==
- Transport in Brussels
- History of Brussels
