= Hôtel des Monnaies metro station =

Metro station in Brussels, Belgium

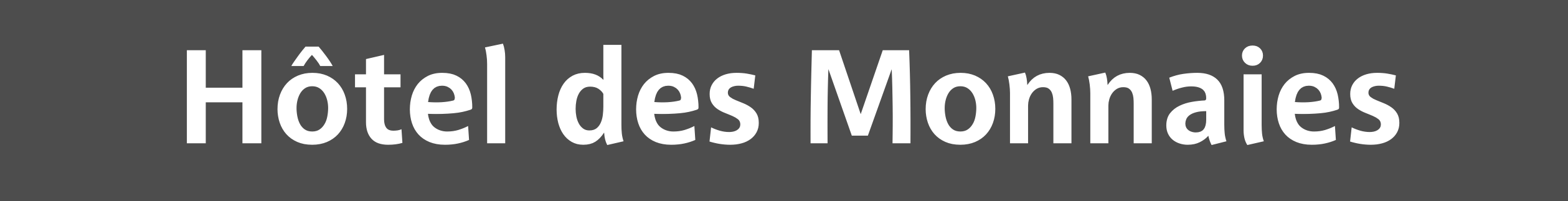
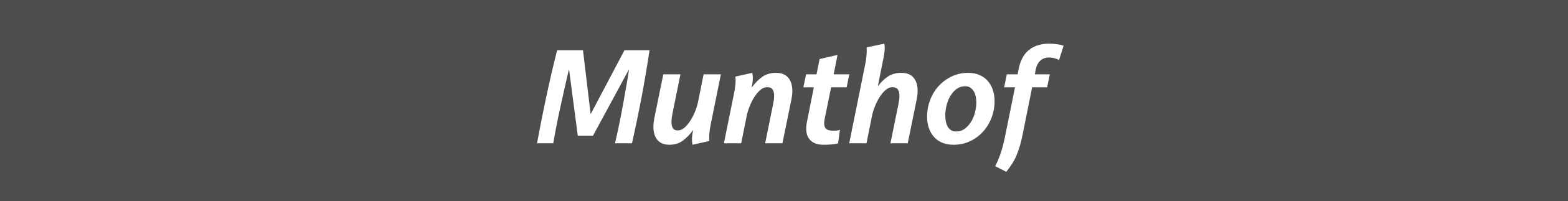

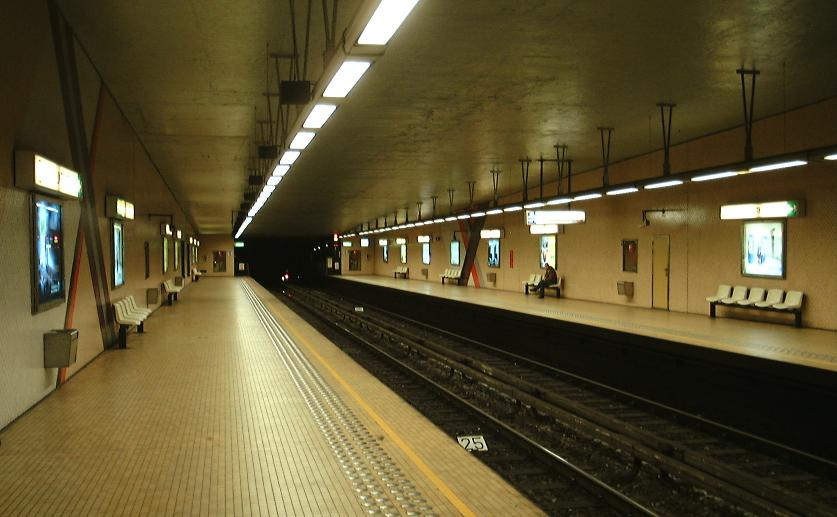
- Hôtel des Monnaies/Munthof metro station

General information
- Location: Rue de l'Hôtel des Monnaies / Munthofstraat; 1060 Saint-Gilles, Brussels-Capital Region, Belgium
- Coordinates: 50°50′0″N 4°20′58″E
- Owner: STIB/MIVB
- Platforms: 2
- Tracks: 2

Construction
- Structure type: Underground

History
- Opened: 2 October 1988; 37 years ago

Services
Preceding station	Brussels Metro	Following station
Louise/Louiza towards Elisabeth	Line 2	Porte de Hal/Hallepoort towards Simonis
Porte de Hal/Hallepoort towards Elisabeth	Line 6	Louise/Louiza towards King Baudouin
Location

Hôtel des Monnaies (French, pronounced [otɛl de mɔnɛ]) or Munthof (Dutch, pronounced [ˈmʏntɦɔf]) is a Brussels Metro station on the southern segment of lines 2 and 6. It is located under the Small Ring (Brussels' inner ring road), near St. Peter's Hospital, in the municipality of Saint-Gilles, south of the City of Brussels, Belgium. One of its entrances is on the Rue de l'Hôtel des Monnaies/Munthofstraat, after which it is named, and where Belgian currency used to be minted.

The metro station opened on 2 October 1988 as part of the Louise/Louiza–Gare du Midi/Zuidstation extension of line 2 from Simonis. Line 2 has since been extended beyond Gare du Midi to Clemenceau in 1993, Delacroix in 2006, and Gare de l'Ouest/Weststation in 2009. Then, following the reorganisation of the Brussels Metro on 4 April 2009, it now lies on the joint section of lines 2 and 6. During the construction, work on the metro tunnels ran up against the foundations of Brussels' old city walls, which ran 10 metres (33 ft) beneath ground level. These walls now form part of the station.

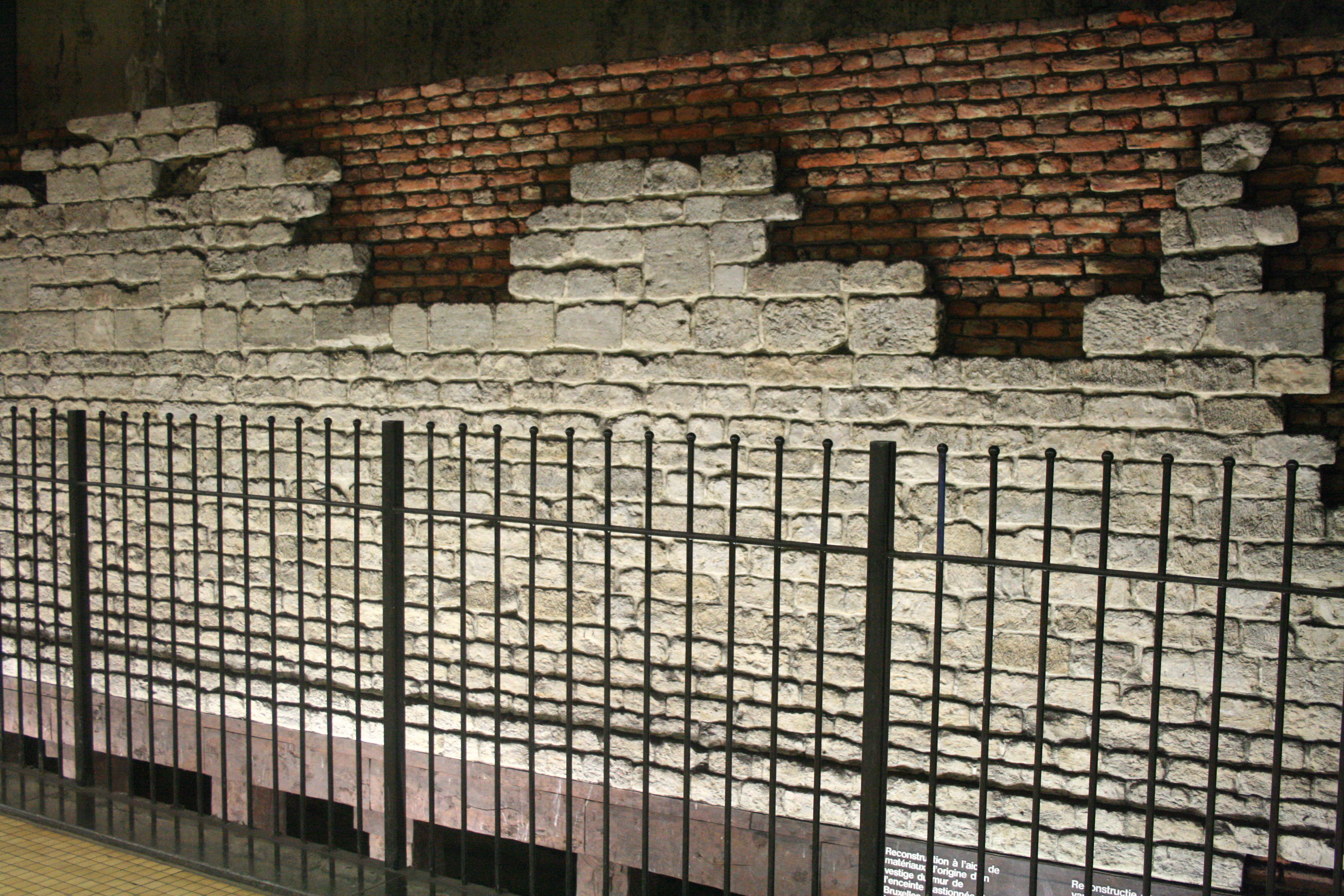
Old walls preserved in the station

== See also ==
- Transport in Brussels
- History of Brussels
