= Louise metro station =

Metro station in Brussels, Belgium

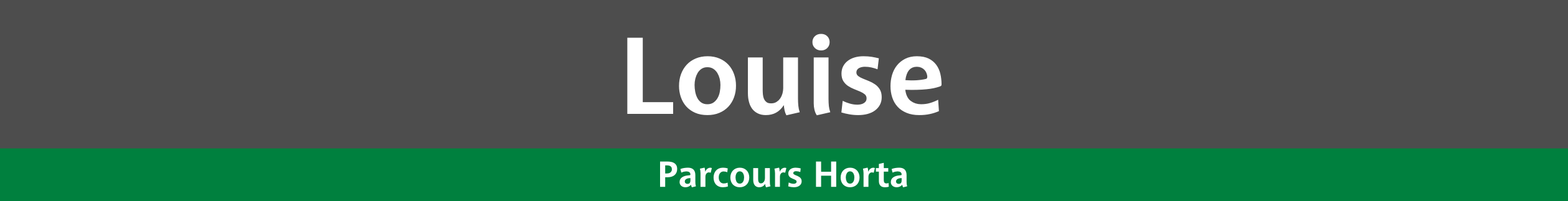
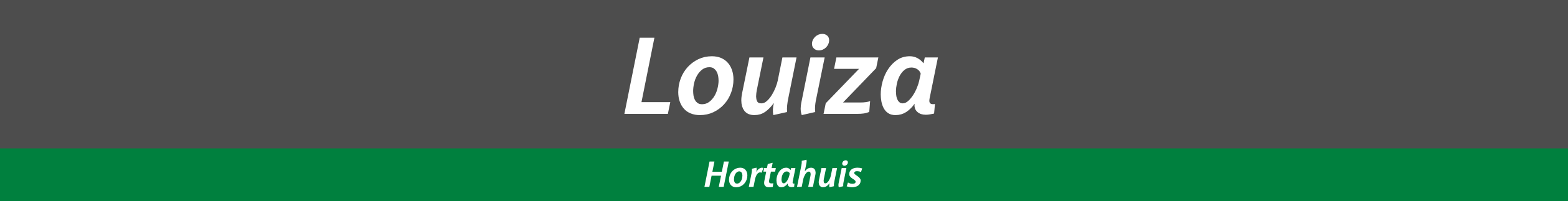

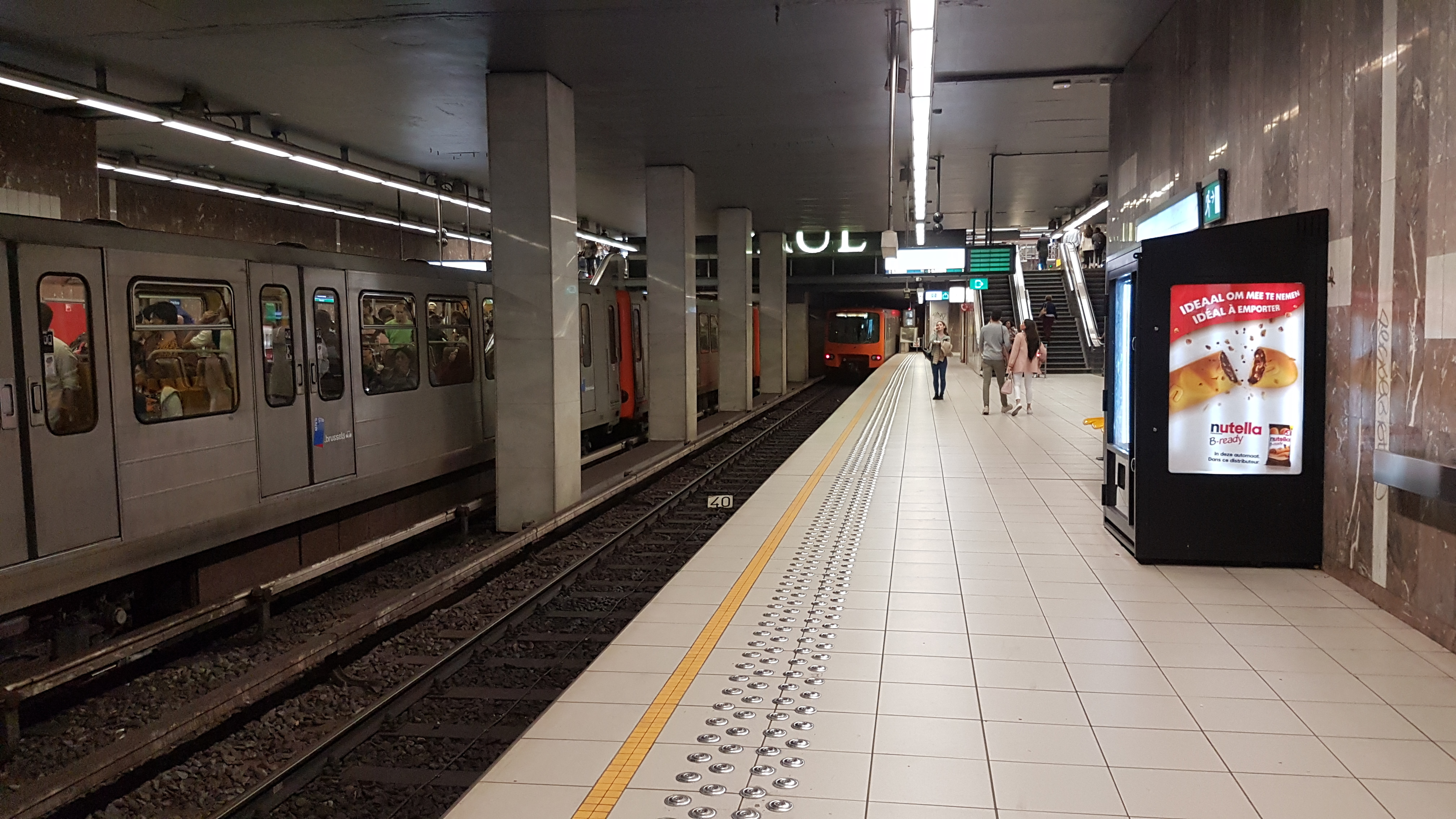
- Louise/Louiza metro station

General information
- Location: Place Louise / Louizaplein; 1000 City of Brussels, Brussels-Capital Region, Belgium
- Coordinates: 50°50′9″N 4°21′19″E
- Owner: STIB/MIVB
- Platforms: 2
- Tracks: 2

Construction
- Structure type: Underground

History
- Opened: 19 August 1985; 41 years ago

Services
Preceding station	Brussels Metro	Following station
Porte de Namur/Naamsepoort towards Elisabeth	Line 2	Hôtel des Monnaies/Munthof towards Simonis
Porte de Namur/Naamsepoort towards Elisabeth	Line 6	Hôtel des Monnaies/Munthof towards King Baudouin
Location

Louise (French) or Louiza (Dutch) is a Brussels Metro station on the southern segment of lines 2 and 6. It is located under the Small Ring (Brussels' inner ring road) at the Place Louise/Louizaplein, at the end of Avenue Louise/Louizalaan, in the City of Brussels, Belgium. The station takes its name from that nearby avenue, itself named after King Leopold II's eldest daughter, Princess Louise.

The metro station opened on 19 August 1985 and was the southern terminus of line 2 until the opening of an extension to Gare du Midi/Zuidstation on 2 October 1988. Line 2 has since been extended beyond Gare du Midi to Clemenceau in 1993, Delacroix in 2006, and Gare de l'Ouest/Weststation in 2009. Then, following the reorganisation of the Brussels Metro on 4 April 2009, it now lies on the joint section of lines 2 and 6.

The square above the station was used as a filming location for the music video for Stromae's song Formidable in 2013.

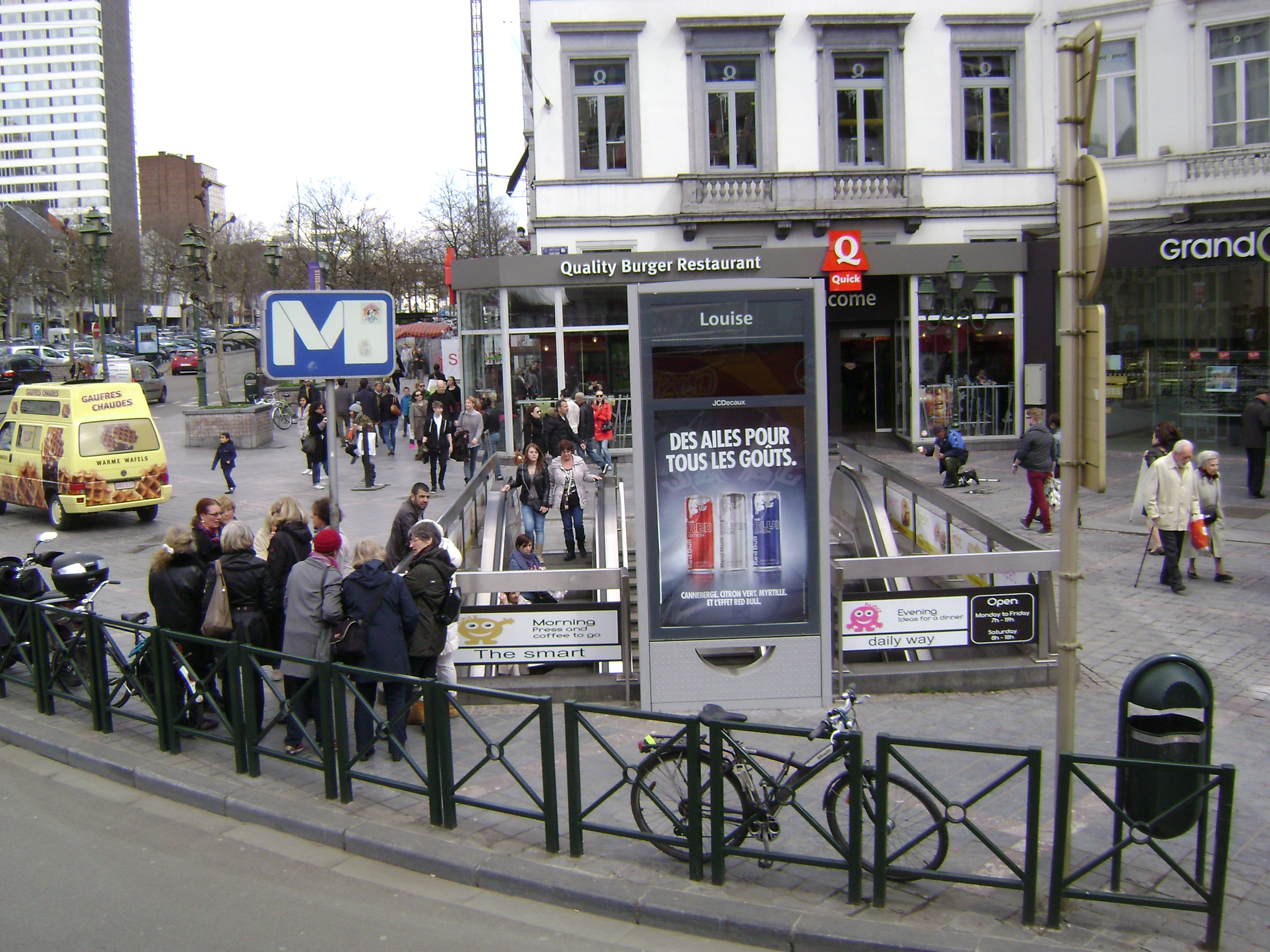
Entrance to the station

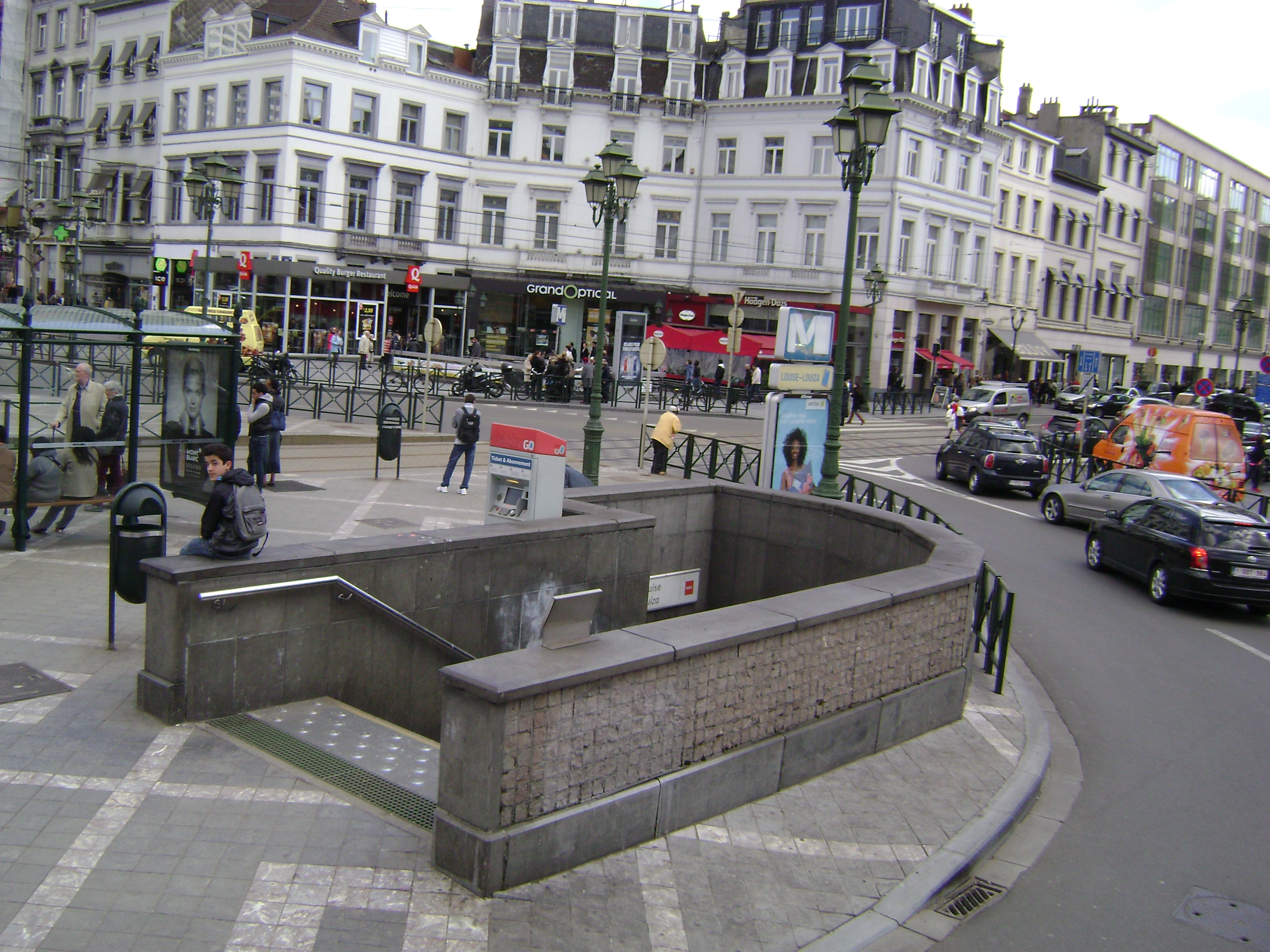
Another entrance

La Terre en Fleur by Edmond Dubrunfaut

== See also ==
- Transport in Brussels
- History of Brussels
