= Porte de Hal metro station =

Metro station in Brussels, Belgium

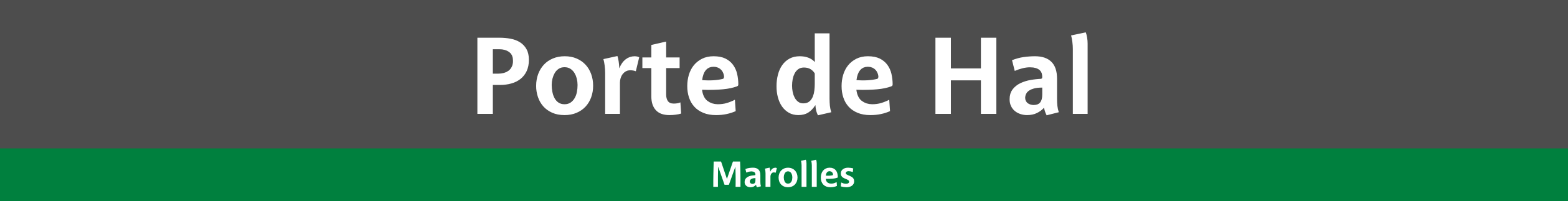
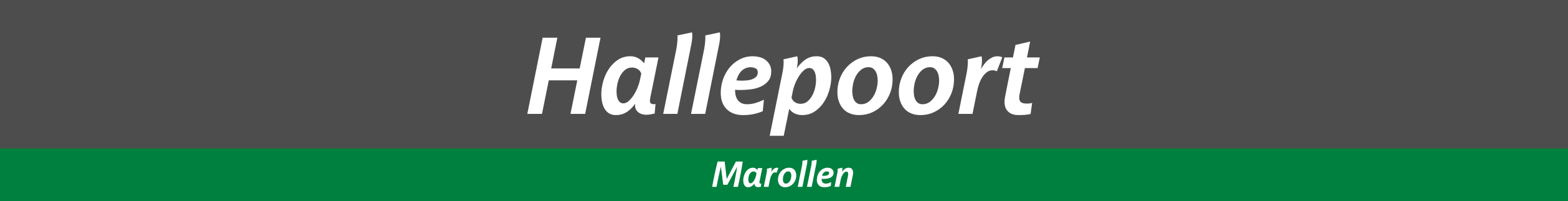

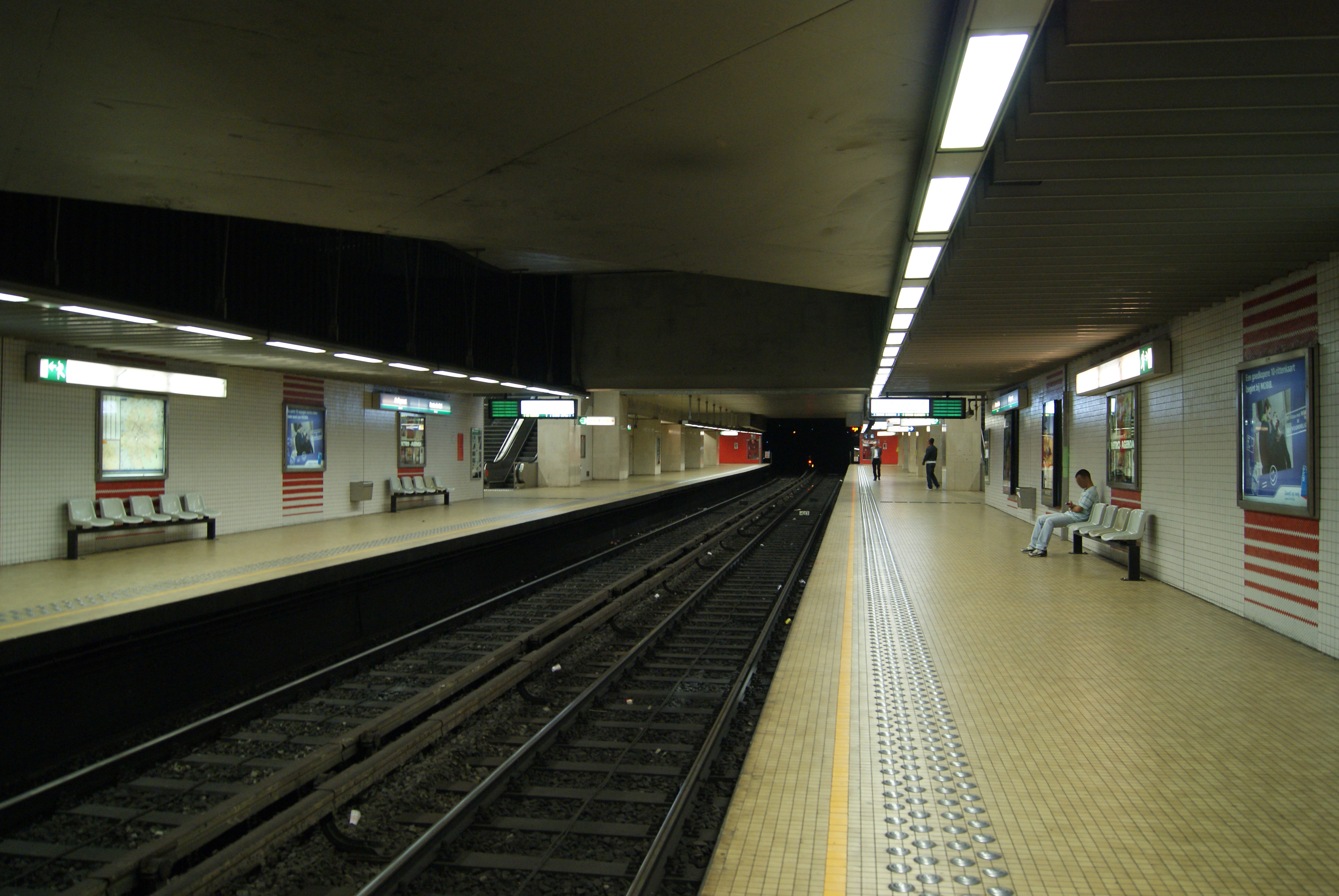
- Hallepoort/Porte de Hal metro station

General information
- Location: Avenue de la Porte de Hal / Hallepoortlaan; 1060 Saint-Gilles, Brussels-Capital Region, Belgium
- Coordinates: 50°50′01″N 4°20′36″E
- Owner: STIB/MIVB
- Platforms: 2 (metro); 2 (premetro)
- Tracks: 2 (metro); 2 (premetro)
- Connections: Line 3 Line 4

Construction
- Structure type: Underground
- Platform levels: 2

History
- Rebuilt: 2 October 1988; 38 years ago

Services
| Preceding station | Brussels Metro | Following station |
|---|---|---|
| Hôtel des Monnaies/Munthof towards Elisabeth | Line 2 | Gare du Midi/Zuidstation towards Simonis |
| Hôtel des Monnaies/Munthof towards Elisabeth | Line 6 | Gare du Midi/Zuidstation towards King Baudouin |
Location

Porte de Hal (French, pronounced [pɔʁt də al]) or Hallepoort (Dutch, pronounced [ˈɦɑləˌpoːrt]) is a rapid transit station in Brussels, Belgium, consisting of both a metro station (on the southern segment of lines 2 and 6) and a premetro (underground tram) station (serving lines 4 and 10 on the North–South Axis between Brussels-North railway station and Albert premetro station). The station is located in the municipality of Saint-Gilles, south of the City of Brussels, under the Small Ring (Brussels' inner ring road) and next to the 14th-century Halle Gate, after which it is named. It is one metro stop away from Brussels-South railway station.

The metro station opened on 2 October 1988 as part of the Louise/Louiza–Gare du Midi/Zuidstation extension of line 2 from Simonis. Line 2 has since been extended beyond Gare du Midi to Clemenceau in 1993, Delacroix in 2006, and Gare de l'Ouest/Weststation in 2009. Since 3 December 1993, the station has also accommodated North–South Axis premetro services at separate platforms (the metro operates one level below the premetro lines). Then, following the reorganisation of the Brussels Metro on 4 April 2009, it is served by lines 2, 3, 4 and 6. Line 3 was disbanded in 2024 and replaced by the new line 10.

The station contains several artworks by François Schuiten of metro trains and futuristic cityscapes, including some views of the medieval Halle Gate amongst skyscrapers.

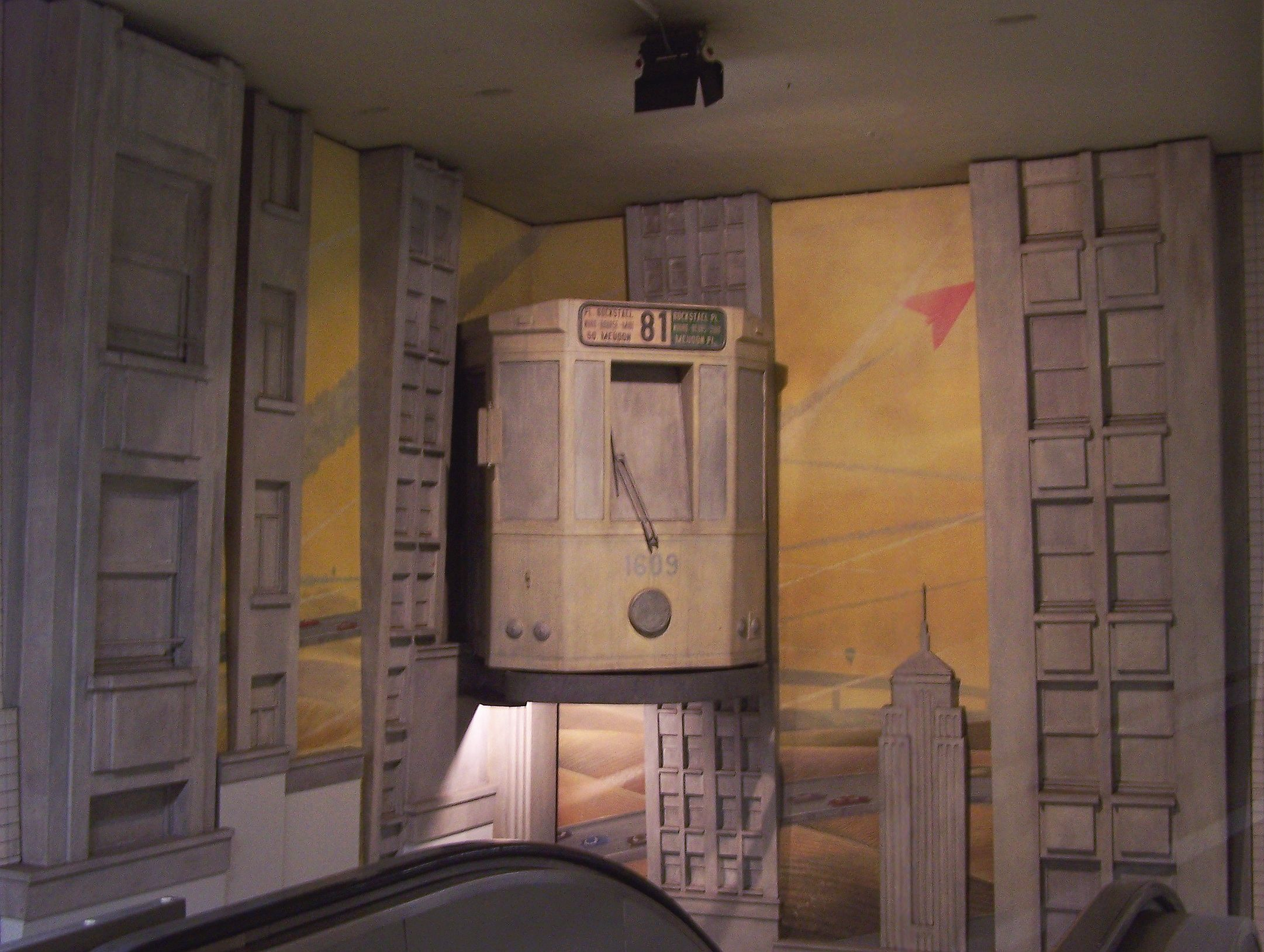
Le Passage inconnu by François Schuiten

== See also ==
- Transport in Brussels
- History of Brussels
