= Beekkant metro station =

Metro station in Brussels, Belgium

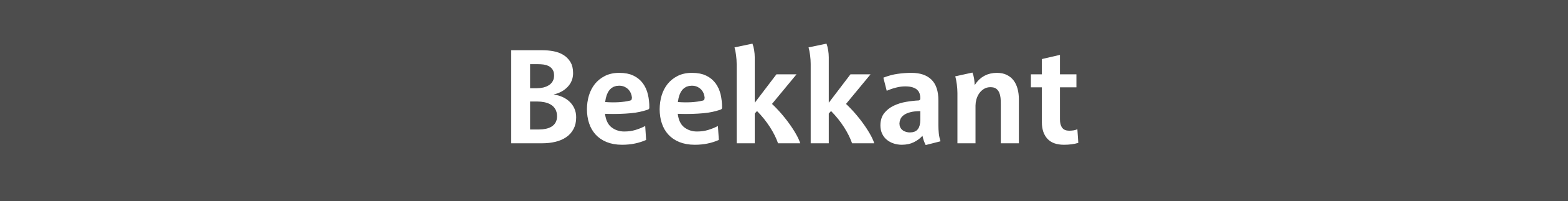

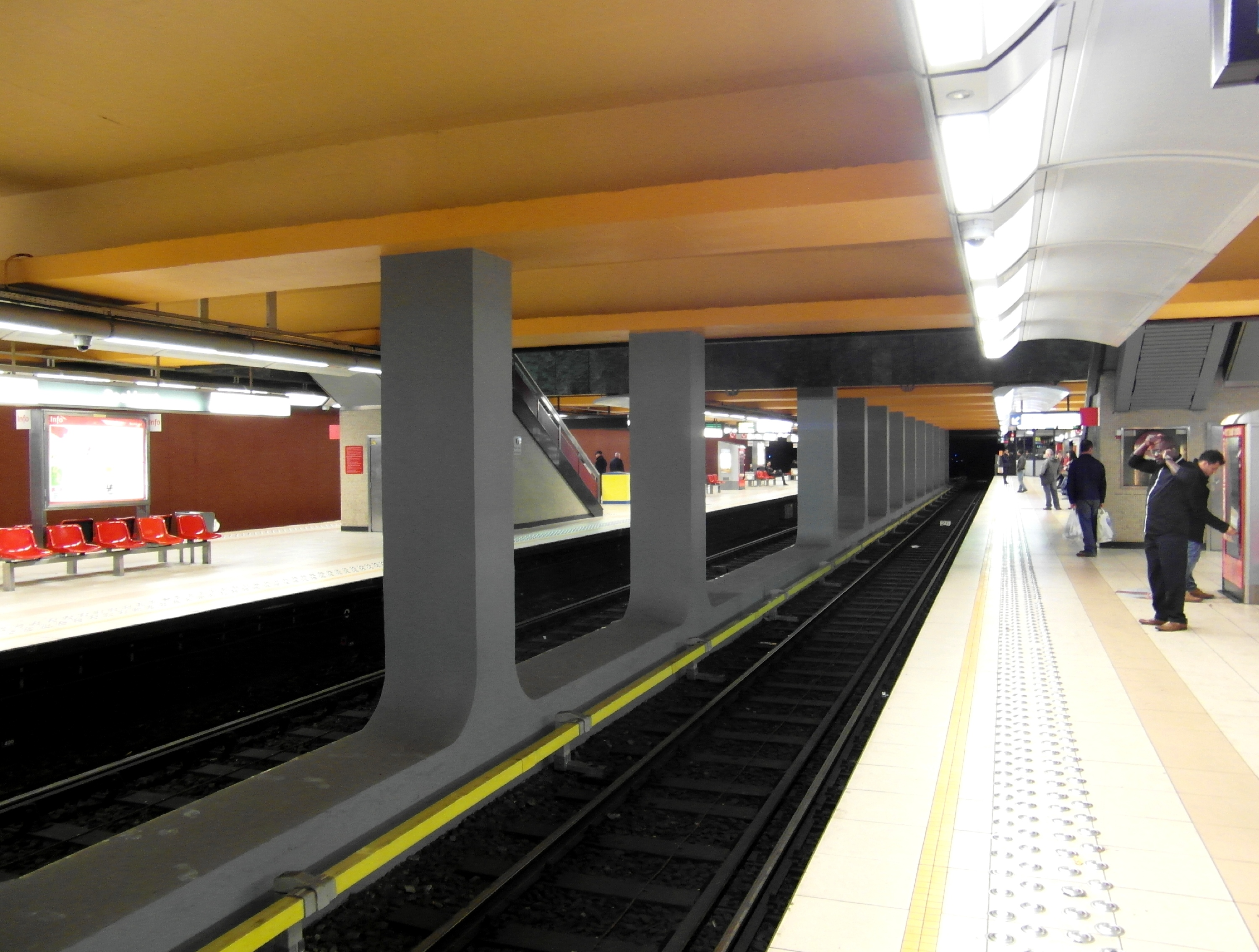
- Beekkant metro station

General information
- Location: Boulevard Edmond Machtens / Edmond Machtenslaan; 1080 Molenbeek-Saint-Jean, Brussels-Capital Region, Belgium
- Coordinates: 50°51′13″N 4°19′22″E
- Owner: STIB/MIVB
- Platforms: 2 island platforms
- Tracks: 4

Construction
- Structure type: Underground

History
- Opened: 8 May 1981; 45 years ago

Services
Preceding station	Brussels Metro	Following station
Gare de l'Ouest/Weststation Terminus	Line 1	Étangs Noirs/Zwarte Vijvers towards Stockel/Stokkel
Gare de l'Ouest/Weststation towards Elisabeth	Line 2	Osseghem/Ossegem towards Simonis
Gare de l'Ouest/Weststation towards Erasme/Erasmus	Line 5	Étangs Noirs/Zwarte Vijvers towards Herrmann-Debroux
Gare de l'Ouest/Weststation towards Elisabeth	Line 6	Osseghem/Ossegem towards King Baudouin
Location

Beekkant is a Brussels Metro station on lines 1, 2, 5 and 6. It is located under the Boulevard Edmond Machtens/Edmond Machtenslaan in the municipality of Molenbeek-Saint-Jean, in the western part of Brussels, Belgium. The station's name translates into English as "Brookside".

The metro station opened on 8 May 1981 as part of the Sainte-Catherine/Sint-Katelijne–Beekkant extension of former east–west line 1, and was for a year, until 6 October 1982, the western terminus of the metro. Then, following the reorganisation of the Brussels Metro on 4 April 2009, it is served by lines 1, 2, 5 and 6.

The metro station runs parallel to a railway used for freight trains, and from 2010 again, as a suburban railway line of the future Brussels Regional Express Network (RER/GEN).

== Connections ==
The station offers the following connections:

- The trains of the line 1 from the east continue their route towards Gare de l'Ouest/Weststation and Stockel/Stokkel.
- The trains of the line 5 from the east continue their route towards Erasme/Erasmus and Herrmann-Debroux.
- The trains of the line 2 from Gare de l'Ouest/Weststation continue their route towards Simonis.
- The trains of the line 6 from Gare de l'Ouest/Weststation continue their route towards Roi Baudouin/Koning Boudewijn.
- The trains of the lines 2 and 6 towards Gare de l'Ouest/Weststation continue their route towards Elisabeth.

== See also ==
- Transport in Brussels
- History of Brussels
