= Vandervelde metro station =

Metro station in Brussels, Belgium

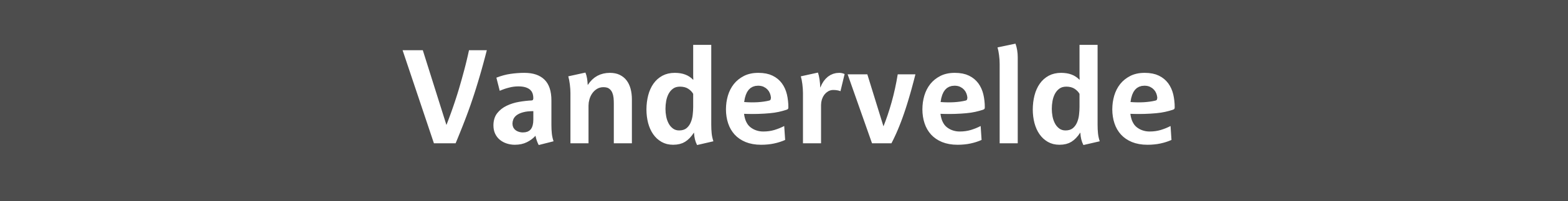

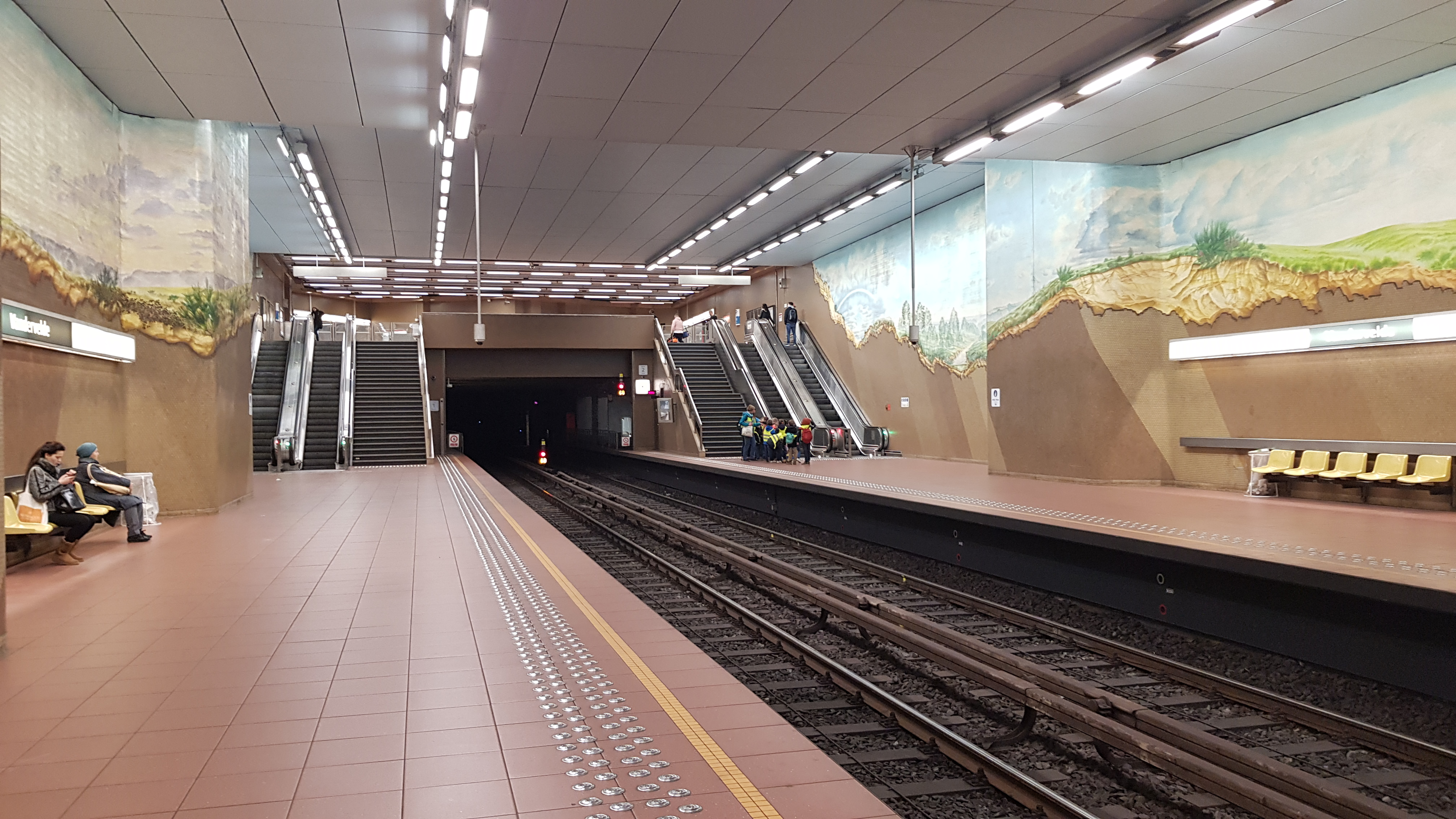
- Vandervelde metro station

General information
- Location: Avenue Émile Vandervelde / Emile Vanderveldelaan; 1200 Woluwe-Saint-Lambert, Brussels-Capital Region, Belgium
- Coordinates: 50°50′51″N 4°26′54″E
- Owner: STIB/MIVB
- Platforms: 2
- Tracks: 2

Construction
- Structure type: Underground

History
- Opened: 7 May 1982; 44 years ago

Services
Preceding station	Brussels Metro	Following station
Roodebeek towards Gare de l'Ouest/Weststation	Line 1	Alma towards Stockel/Stokkel
Location

Vandervelde is a Brussels Metro station on the eastern branch of line 1 It is located in the municipality of Woluwe-Saint-Lambert, in the eastern part of Brussels, Belgium. It is named after the Avenue Émile Vandervelde/Émile Vanderveldelaan, which it serves.

The metro station opened on 7 May 1982. Since 4 April 2009, the station has been served by the eastern branch of line 1 (previously line 1B).

The murals in the metro station are by the Belgian artist Paul De Gobert.

== See also ==
- Transport in Brussels
- History of Brussels
