= Osseghem metro station =

Metro station in Brussels, Belgium

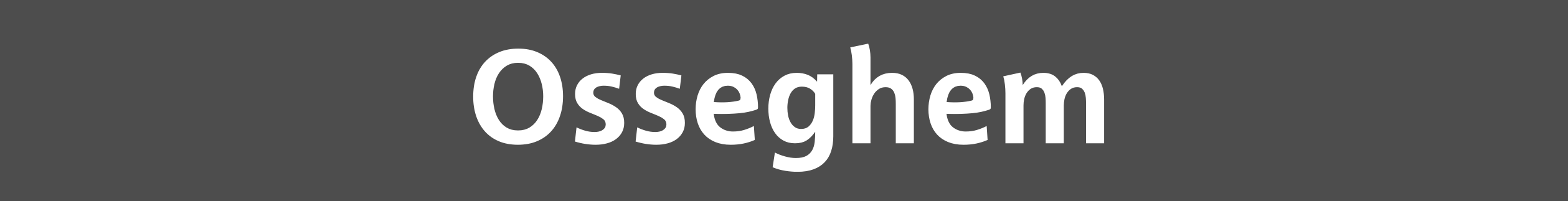
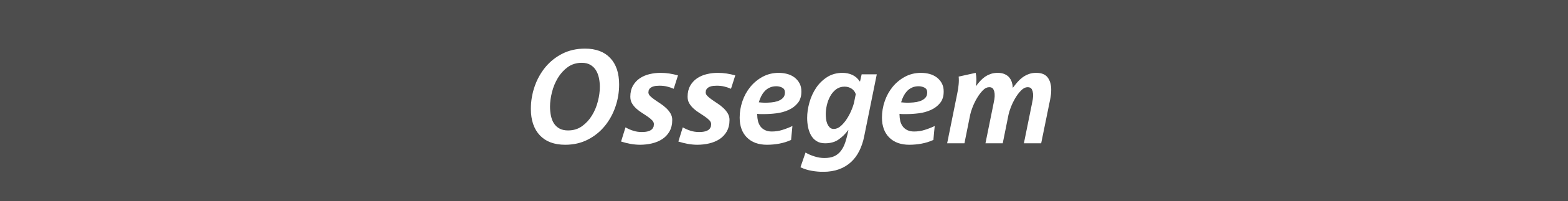

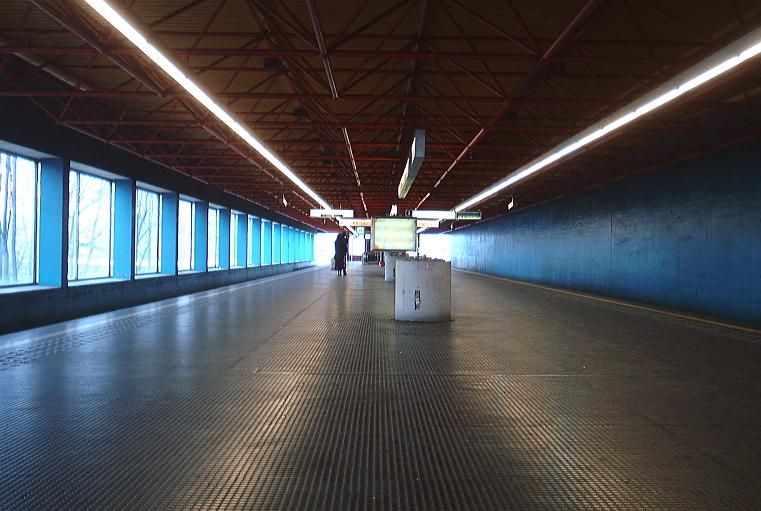
- Osseghem/Ossegem metro station

General information
- Location: Chaussée de Gand / Gentse Steenweg; 1080 Molenbeek-Saint-Jean, Brussels-Capital Region, Belgium
- Coordinates: 50°51′25″N 4°19′30″E
- Owner: STIB/MIVB
- Platforms: 1 island platform
- Tracks: 2

Construction
- Structure type: Elevated

History
- Opened: 6 October 1982; 43 years ago

Services
Preceding station	Brussels Metro	Following station
Beekkant towards Elisabeth	Line 2	Simonis Terminus
Beekkant towards Elisabeth	Line 6	Simonis towards King Baudouin
Location

Osseghem (French, pronounced [ɔsəɡɛm]; former Dutch spelling) or Ossegem (modern Dutch, pronounced [ˈɔsəɣɛm]) is a Brussels Metro station on lines 2 and 6. It is located under the Chaussée de Gand/Gentsesteenweg in the municipality of Molenbeek-Saint-Jean, in the western part of Brussels, Belgium. The station takes its name from the nearby Osseghem/Ossegem neighbourhood. (Note: The name is of Germanic (Frankish) origin and is composed of Odso + -inga + heim, meaning "residence/domain of the family of Odso".)

The metro station opened on 6 October 1982 as part of the Beekkant–Bockstael extension of former line 1A. Then, following the reorganisation of the Brussels Metro on 4 April 2009, it now lies on the joint section of lines 2 and 6.

In 2025, the station's decor was refreshed to include decorative elements featuring marbles, designed by the local artist Sarah Vanagt.

== See also ==
- Transport in Brussels
- History of Brussels
