= Roodebeek metro station =

Metro station in Brussels, Belgium

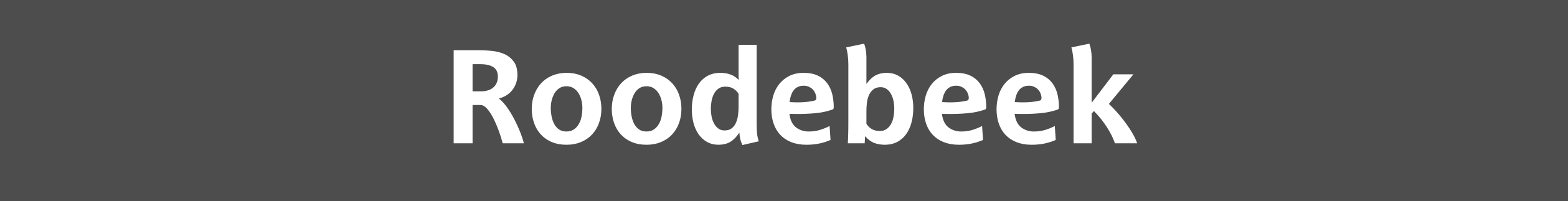

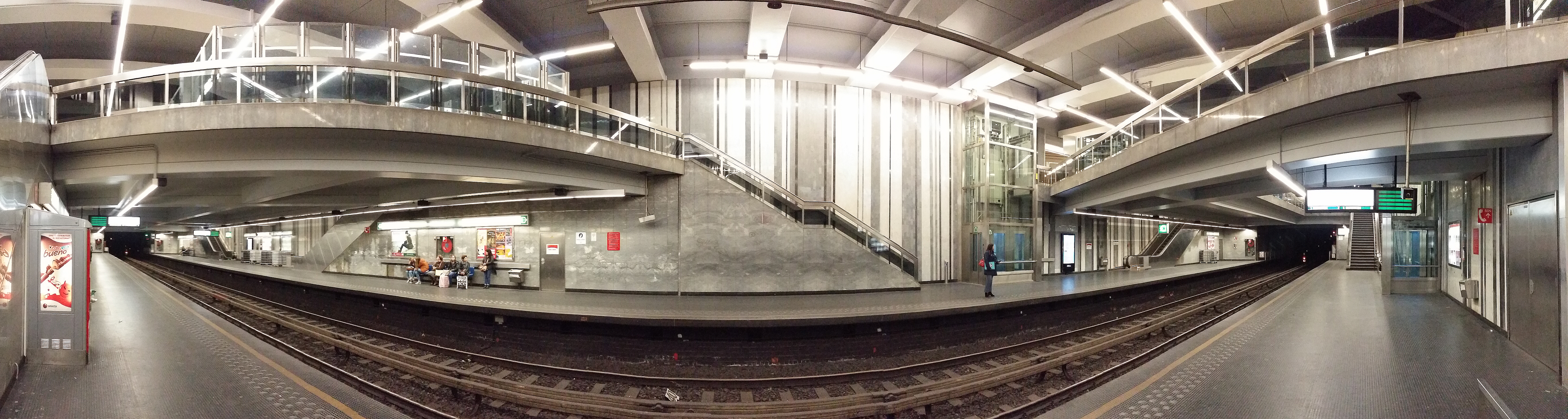
- Roodebeek metro station

General information
- Location: Avenue Paul Hymans / Paul Hymanslaan; 1200 Woluwe-Saint-Lambert, Brussels-Capital Region, Belgium
- Coordinates: 50°50′51″N 4°26′9″E
- Owner: STIB/MIVB

History
- Opened: 7 May 1982; 44 years ago

Services
Preceding station	Brussels Metro	Following station
Tomberg towards Gare de l'Ouest/Weststation	Line 1	Vandervelde towards Stockel/Stokkel
Location

Roodebeek is a Brussels Metro station on the eastern branch of line 1. It is located in the municipality of Woluwe-Saint-Lambert, in the eastern part of Brussels, Belgium. The station serves the Woluwe Shopping Center and a bus interchange. It takes its name from the nearby Roodebeek Park.

The metro station opened on 7 May 1982. Since 4 April 2009, the station has been served by the eastern branch of line 1 (previously line 1B). On 29 September 2018, an interchange with tram line 8 was added at the station.

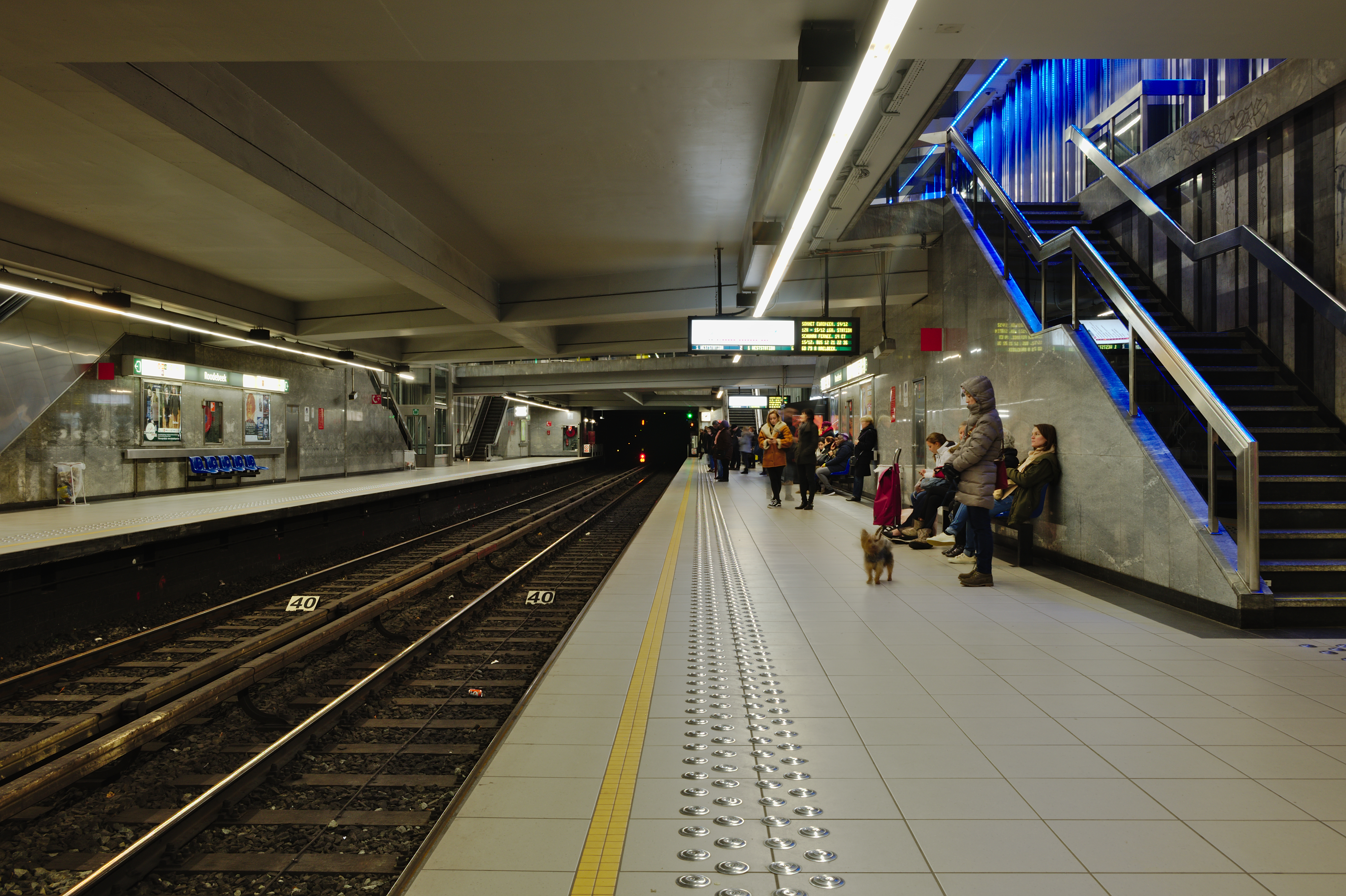
Station platforms with view on Intégration Roodebeek by Luc Peire

== See also ==
- Transport in Brussels
- History of Brussels
