= Hankar =

Hankar may refer to:

- Paul Hankar (1859–1901), Belgian architect and designer
- Hankar metro station, Brussels
- Hankaar or Hankār, egotism, one of the five evils described in Sikh philosophy
- Hankar (Mosul), the birthplace of Sufi saint Abu Saeed Mubarak Makhzoomi
