= Hôtel des Monnaies =

Hôtel des Monnaies may refer to:

- Hôtel des Monnaies, Paris
- Hôtel des Monnaies/Munthof metro station
