= Gare du Midi metro station =

Metro station in Brussels, Belgium

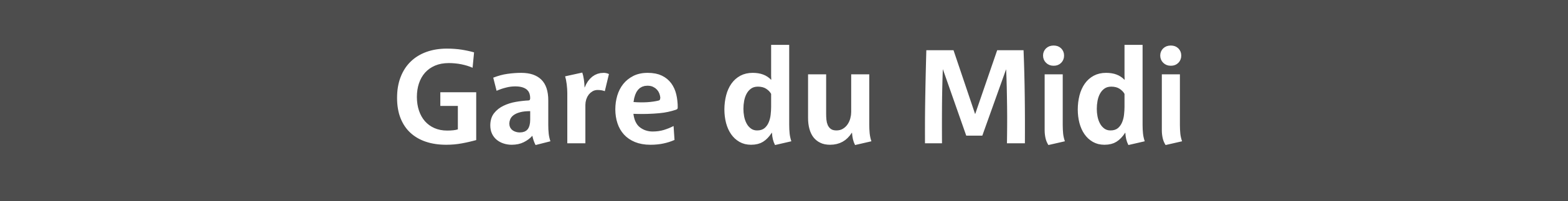
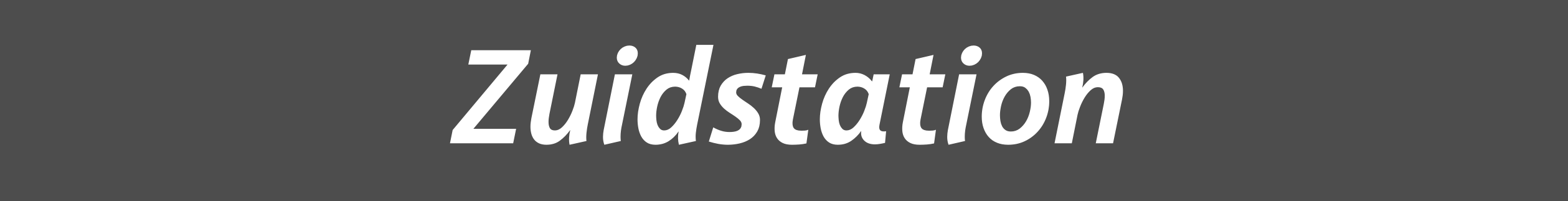

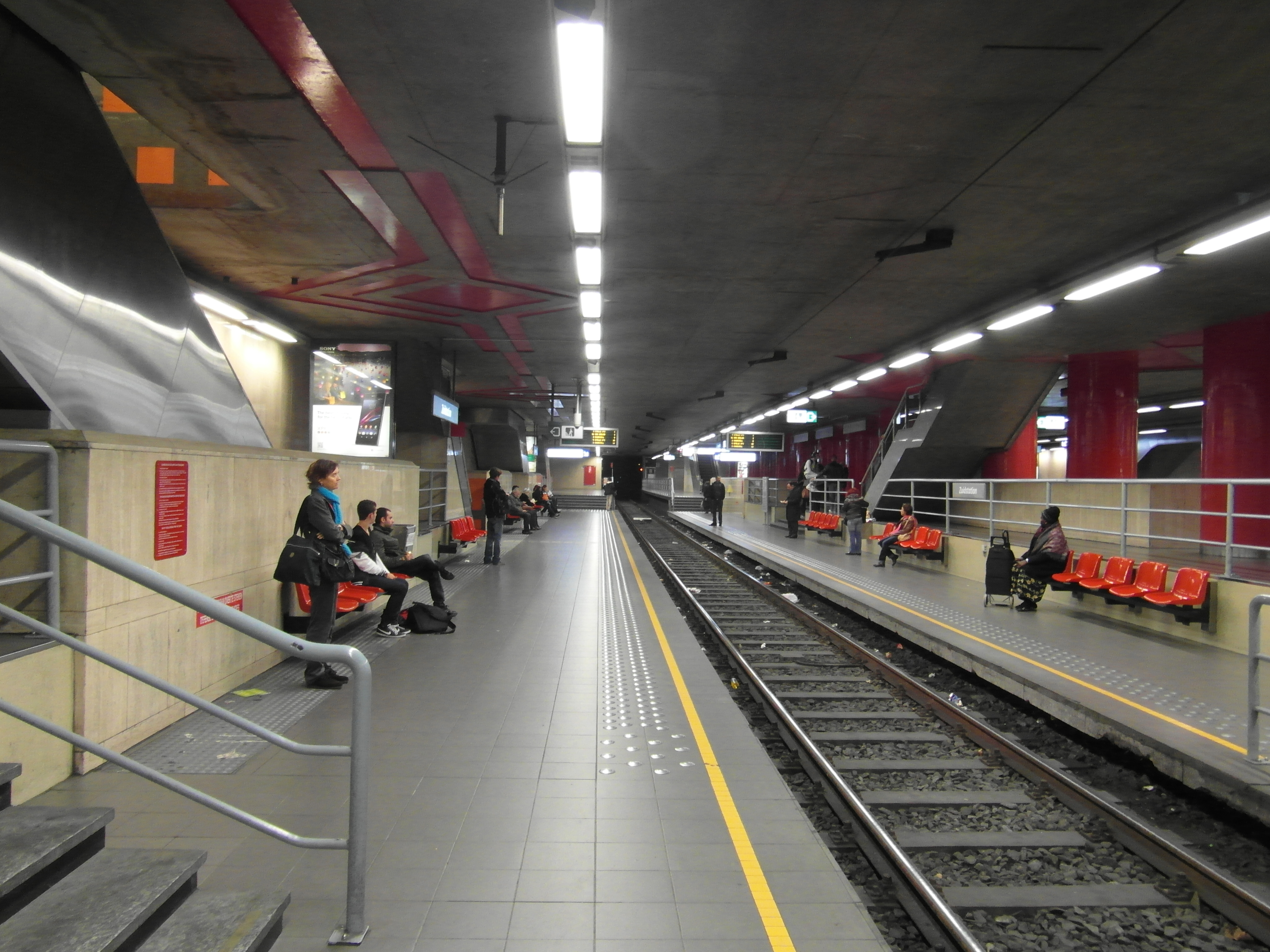
- Gare du Midi/Zuidstation metro station

General information
- Location: Avenue Fonsny / Fonsnylaan 47B; 1060 Saint-Gilles, Brussels-Capital Region, Belgium
- Coordinates: 50°50′6.58″N 4°20′6.8″E
- Owner: STIB/MIVB
- Connections: Brussels Metro: 3 4

Construction
- Structure type: Underground

History
- Opened: 2 October 1988; 37 years ago

Services
Preceding station	Brussels Metro	Following station
Porte de Hal/Hallepoort towards Elisabeth	Line 2	Clemenceau towards Simonis
Porte de Hal/Hallepoort towards Elisabeth	Line 6	Clemenceau towards King Baudouin
Location

Gare du Midi (French) or Zuidstation (Dutch) is a rapid transit station in Brussels, Belgium, consisting of both a metro station (on the southern segment of lines 2 and 6) and a premetro (underground tram) station (serving lines 4 and 10 on the North–South Axis between Brussels-North railway station and Albert premetro station).

The metro station opened on 2 October 1988 as the southern terminus of line 2 from Simonis. Line 2 has since been extended beyond Gare du Midi/Zuidstation to Clemenceau in 1993, Delacroix in 2006, and Gare de l'Ouest/Weststation in 2009. Since 3 December 1993, the station has also accommodated North–South Axis premetro services at separate platforms, with cross-platform interchange between metro and premetro in both directions. Then, following the reorganisation of the Brussels Metro on 4 April 2009, it is served by lines 2, 3, 4 and 6. Line 3 was disbanded in 2024 and replaced by the new line 10.

The metro station is located under Brussels-South railway station, the busiest station in Belgium, and the only Brussels stop for international high-speed rail services Eurostar (including the former Thalys) and TGV.

== Area ==
The South Tower, the tallest building in Belgium, stands in front of the station's main exit (the crossroad of the Avenue Fonsny/Fonsnylaan and the Rue Couverte/Bedektestraat) and houses the Belgian Federal Pensions Service (FPS).

== See also ==
- Transport in Brussels
- History of Brussels
