= Alma metro station =

Metro station in Brussels, Belgium

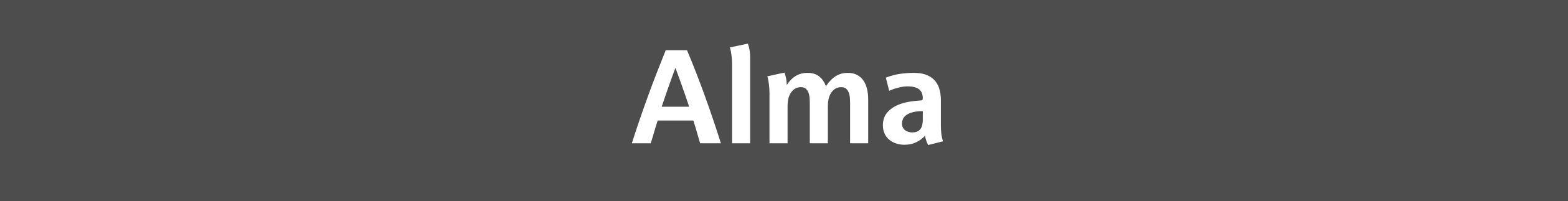

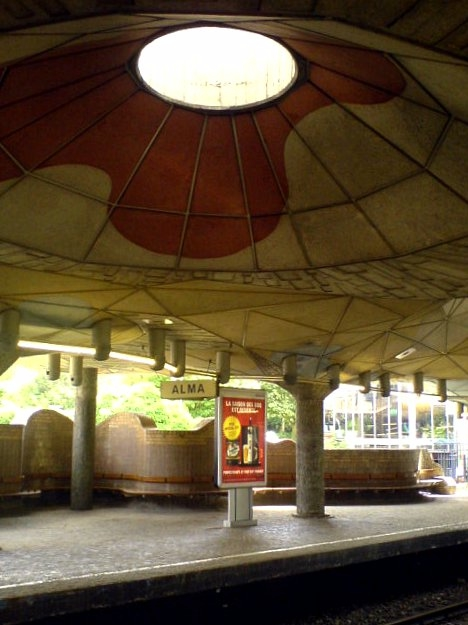
- Alma metro station

General information
- Location: Place de l'Alma / Almaplein; 1200 Woluwe-Saint-Lambert, Brussels-Capital Region, Belgium
- Coordinates: 50°50′59″N 4°27′12″E
- Owner: STIB/MIVB
- Platforms: 2
- Tracks: 2

Construction
- Structure type: At grade

History
- Opened: 7 May 1982; 44 years ago

Services
Preceding station	Brussels Metro	Following station
Vandervelde towards Gare de l'Ouest/Weststation	Line 1	Kraainem/Crainhem towards Stockel/Stokkel
Location

Alma (French pronunciation: [alma]; Dutch pronunciation: [ˈɑlmaː]) is a Brussels Metro station on the eastern branch of line 1. It is located in the municipality of Woluwe-Saint-Lambert, in the eastern part of Brussels, Belgium, serving the Brussels-Woluwe campus of the University of Louvain (UCLouvain). Designed by Lucien Kroll as a total artwork, it takes its name from its location on the Place de l'Alma/Almaplein, the university campus' main square.

The metro station opened on 7 May 1982. The original eastern terminus of the former line 1B was at Tomberg, prior to the opening of the extension to Alma. Alma station then served as the terminus until 1988, when the line was further extended to Stockel/Stokkel. Since 4 April 2009, the station has been served by the eastern branch of line 1 (previously line 1B).

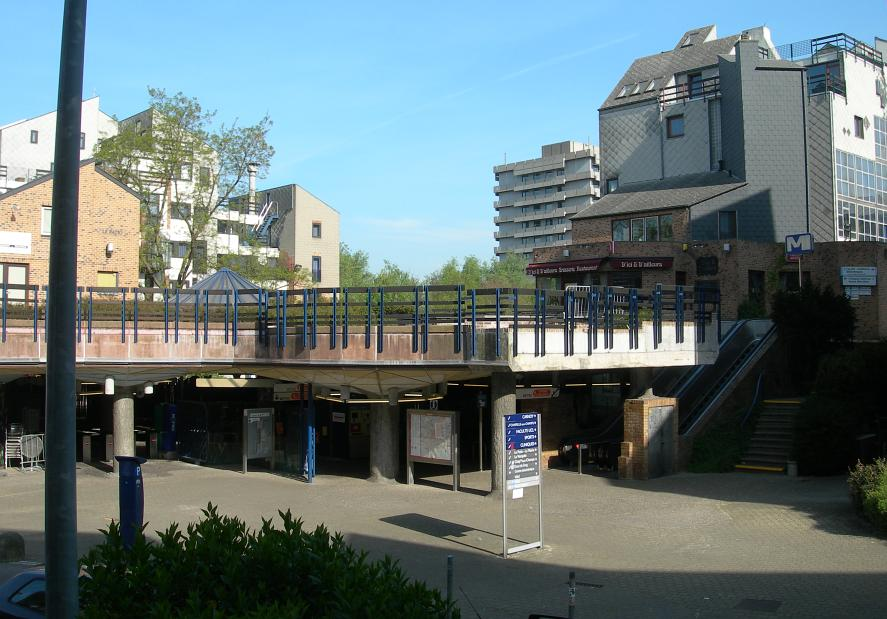
Station entrance on the Place de l'Alma/Almaplein

== See also ==
- Transport in Brussels
- History of Brussels
