= Ribaucourt metro station =

Metro station in Brussels, Belgium

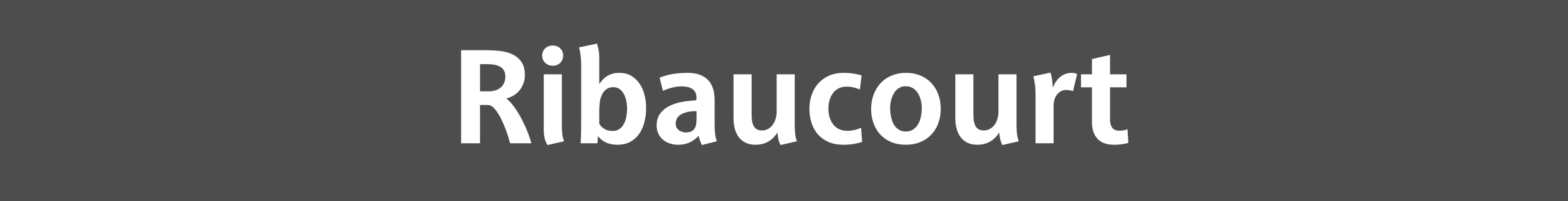

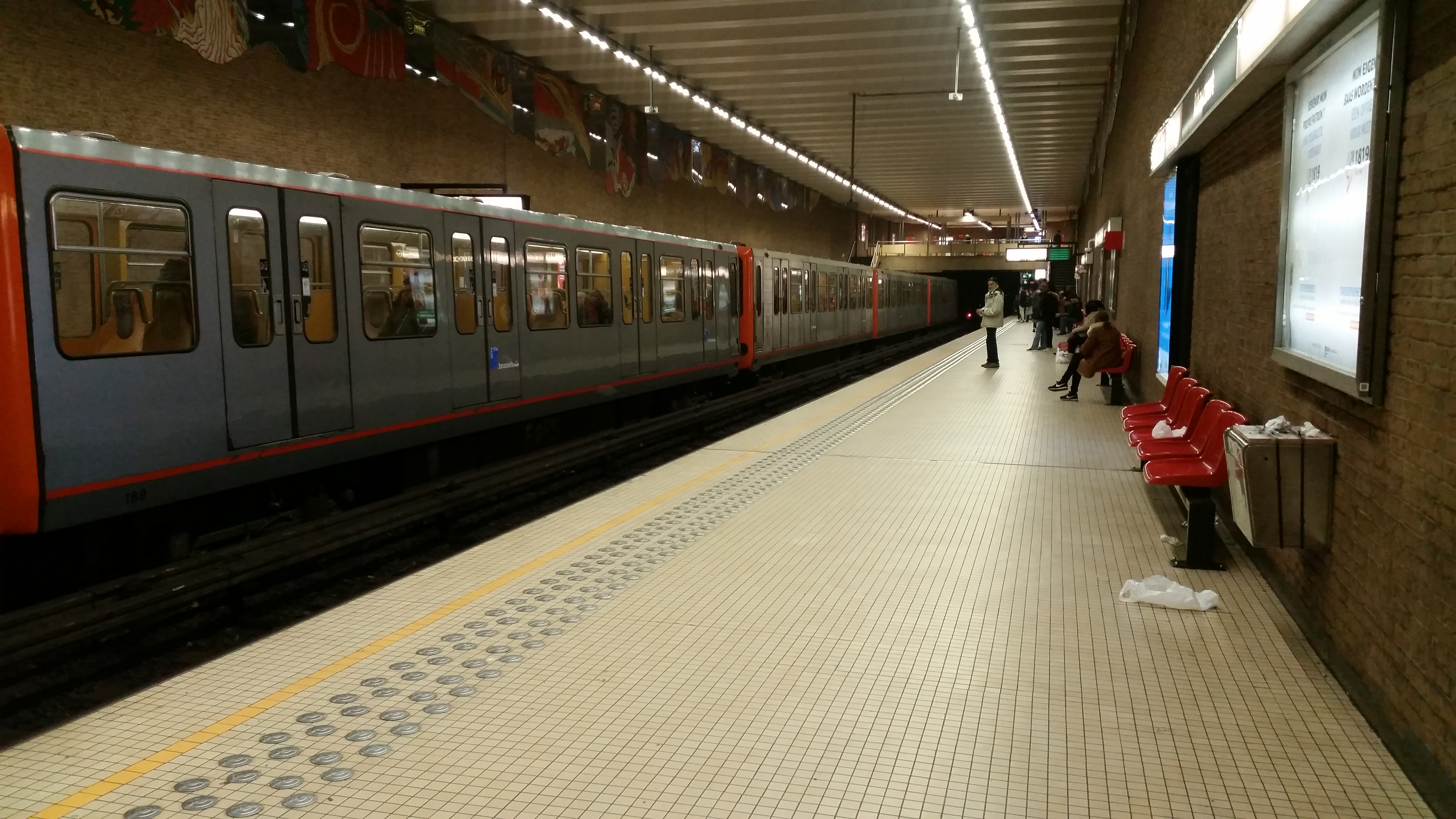
- Ribaucourt metro station

General information
- Location: Boulevard Léopold II / Leopold II-laan; 1080 Molenbeek-Saint-Jean, Brussels-Capital Region, Belgium
- Coordinates: 50°51′38″N 4°20′24″E
- Owner: STIB/MIVB
- Platforms: 2
- Tracks: 2

Construction
- Structure type: Underground

History
- Opened: 2 October 1988; 37 years ago

Services
Preceding station	Brussels Metro	Following station
Elisabeth Terminus	Line 2	Yser/IJzer towards Simonis
Elisabeth Terminus	Line 6	Yser/IJzer towards King Baudouin
Location

Ribaucourt (French pronunciation: [ʁibokuʁ]) is a Brussels Metro station on the northern segment of lines 2 and 6. It is located under the Boulevard Léopold II/Leopold II-laan in the municipality of Molenbeek-Saint-Jean, in the western part of Brussels, Belgium. The station takes its name from the Belgian noble family De Ribaucourt, as well as De Ribaucourt park and castle.

The metro station opened on 2 October 1988 as part of the Rogier–Simonis extension of line 2, the same year that line was converted from premetro (underground tram) to heavy metro. Then, following the reorganisation of the Brussels Metro on 4 April 2009, it now lies on the joint section of lines 2 and 6.

== See also ==
- Transport in Brussels
- History of Brussels
