= Pétillon metro station =

Metro station in Brussels, Belgium

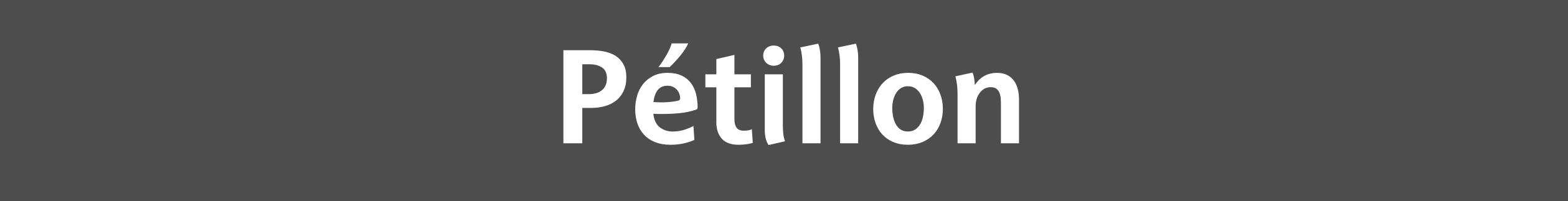

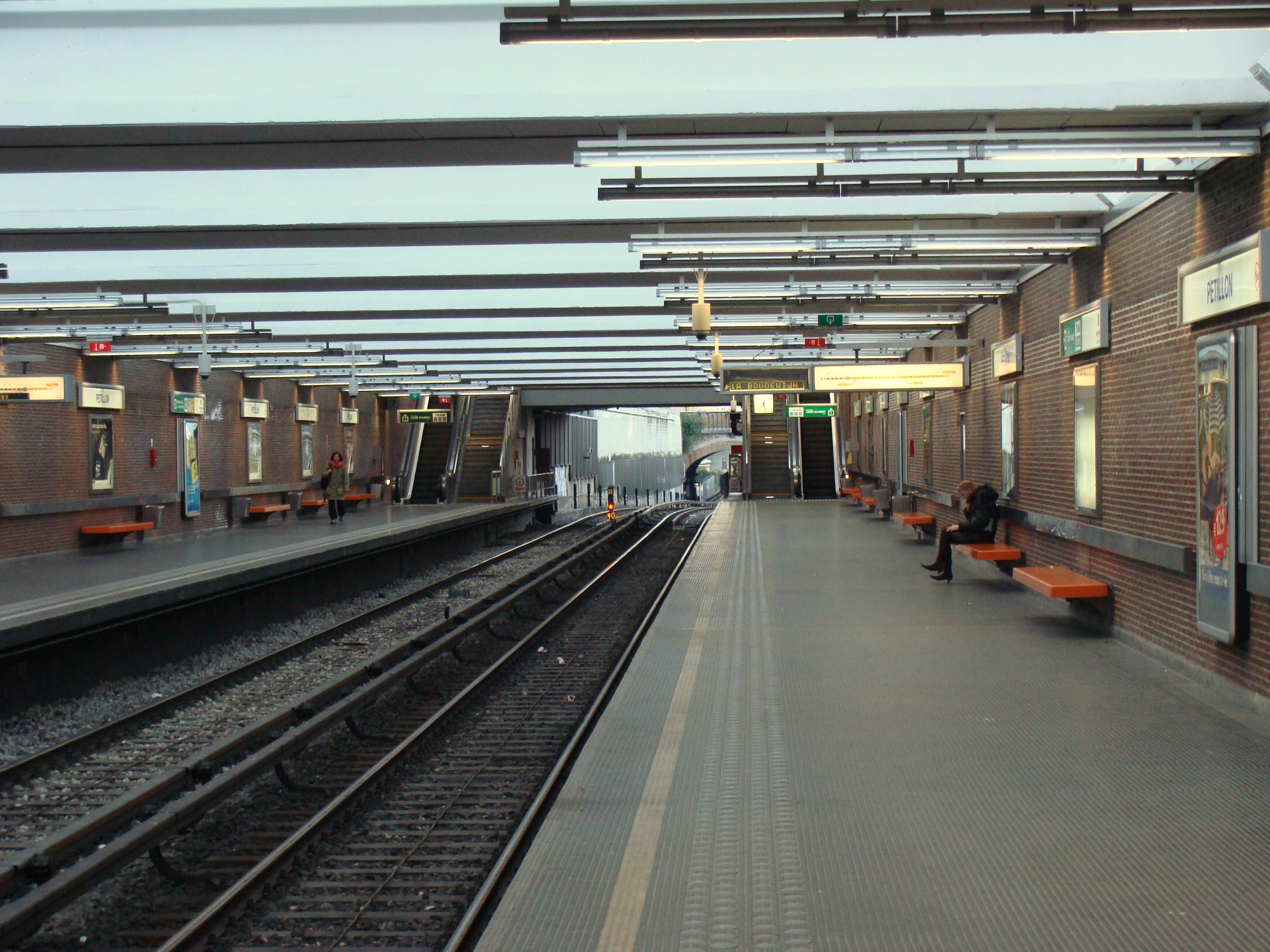
- Pétillon metro station

General information
- Location: Boulevard Louis Schmidt / Louis Schmidtlaan; 1040 Etterbeek, Brussels-Capital Region, Belgium
- Coordinates: 50°49′37″N 4°24′15″E
- Owner: STIB/MIVB
- Platforms: 2
- Tracks: 2

Construction
- Structure type: At grade

History
- Opened: 20 September 1976; 50 years ago

Services
Preceding station	Brussels Metro	Following station
Thieffry towards Erasme/Erasmus	Line 5	Hankar towards Herrmann-Debroux
Location

Pétillon (French pronunciation: [petijɔ̃]) is a Brussels Metro station on the eastern branch of line 5. It is located in the municipality of Etterbeek, in the eastern part of Brussels, Belgium.

The metro station opened on 20 September 1976 and is named after Major Pétillon, a Belgian colonial pioneer who died in Etterbeek in 1909. The station underwent an eighteen-month, €6.3 million renovation ending in April 2008. Then, following the reorganisation of the Brussels Metro on 4 April 2009, it is served by the extended east–west line 5.

The nearby tram station that bears the same name is visited by tram lines 7 and 25.

== See also ==
- Transport in Brussels
- History of Brussels
