= Yser metro station =

Metro station in Brussels, Belgium

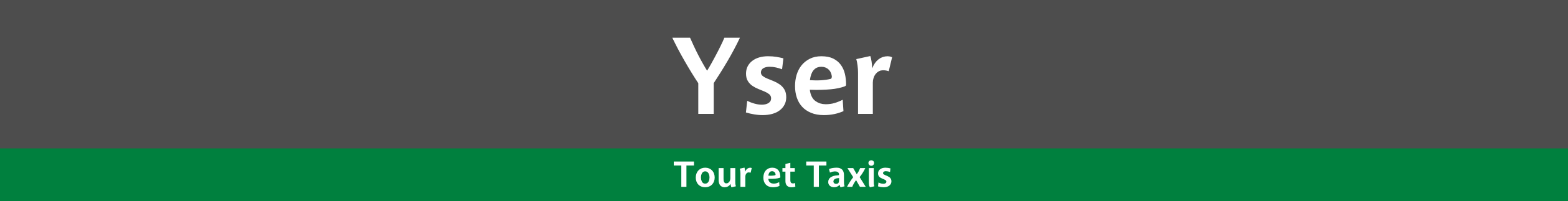
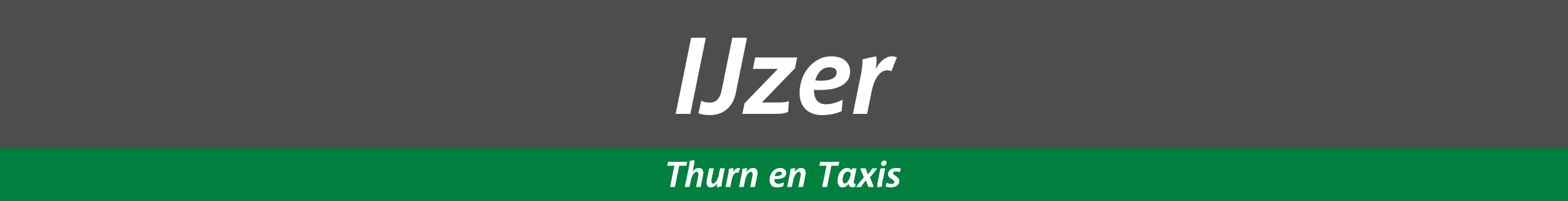

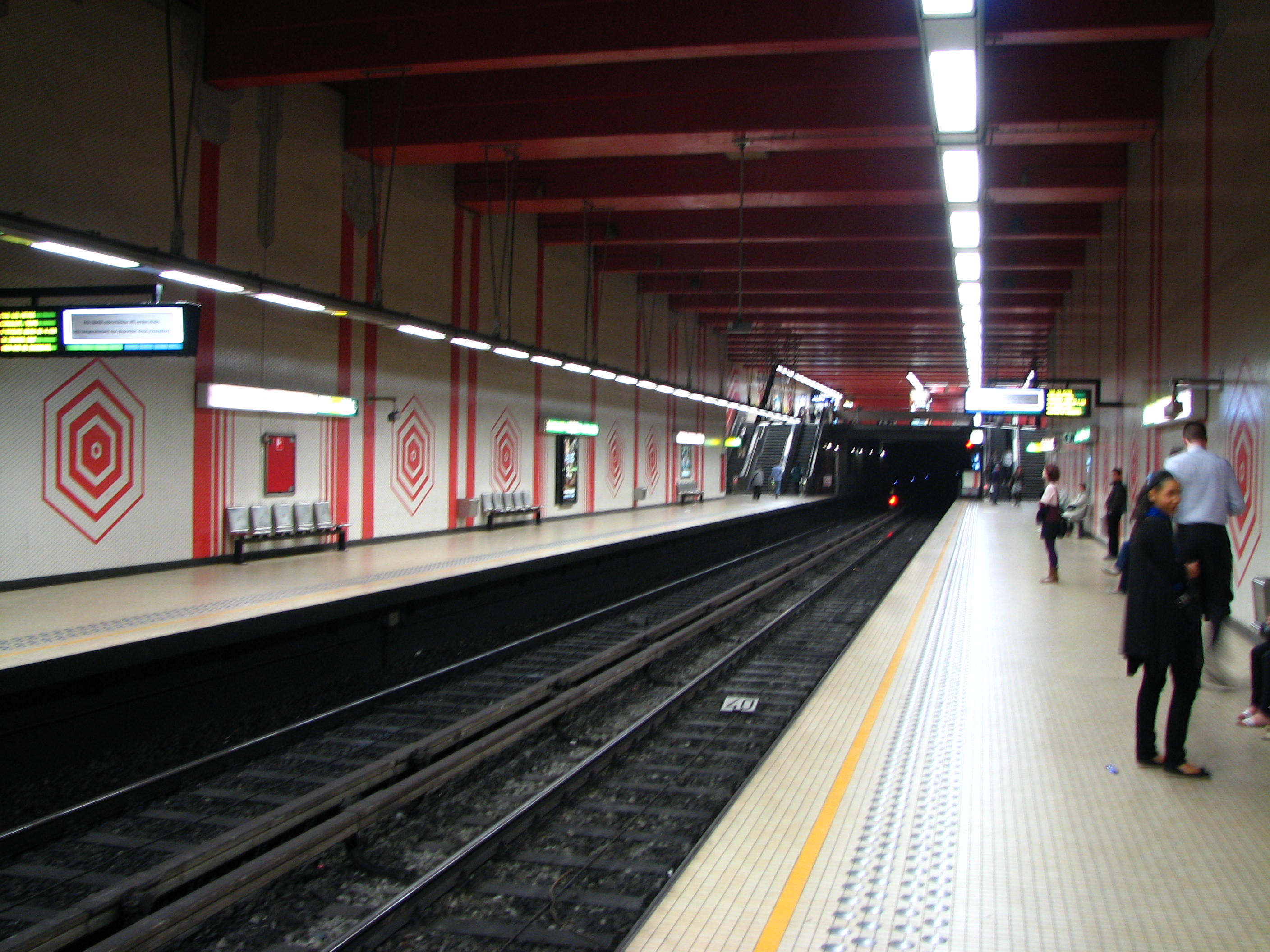
- Yser/IJzer metro station

General information
- Location: Place de l'Yser / IJzerplein; 1000 City of Brussels, Brussels-Capital Region, Belgium
- Coordinates: 50°51′26″N 4°21′6″E
- Owner: STIB/MIVB
- Platforms: 2
- Tracks: 2

Construction
- Structure type: Underground

History
- Opened: 2 October 1988; 37 years ago

Services
Preceding station	Brussels Metro	Following station
Ribaucourt towards Elisabeth	Line 2	Rogier towards Simonis
Ribaucourt towards Elisabeth	Line 6	Rogier towards King Baudouin
Location

Yser (French, pronounced [izɛʁ]) or IJzer (Dutch, pronounced [ˈɛizər]) is a Brussels Metro station on the northern segment of lines 2 and 6. It is located under the Small Ring (Brussels' inner ring road), between the Place de l'Yser/IJzerplein and the Porte d'Anvers/Antwerpsepoort, in the City of Brussels, Belgium. The station takes its name from that aboveground square, itself named after the river Yser.

The metro station opened on 2 October 1988 as part of the Rogier–Simonis extension of line 2, the same year that line was converted from premetro (underground tram) to heavy metro. Then, following the reorganisation of the Brussels Metro on 4 April 2009, it now lies on the joint section of lines 2 and 6.

== See also ==
- Transport in Brussels
- History of Brussels
