= Tomberg metro station =

Metro station in Brussels, Belgium

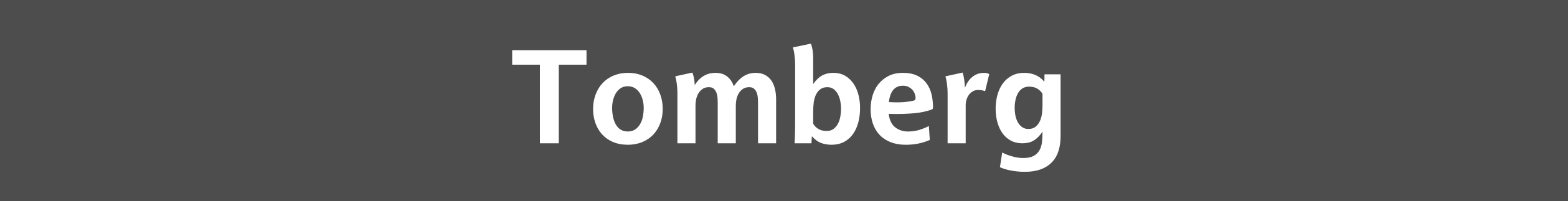

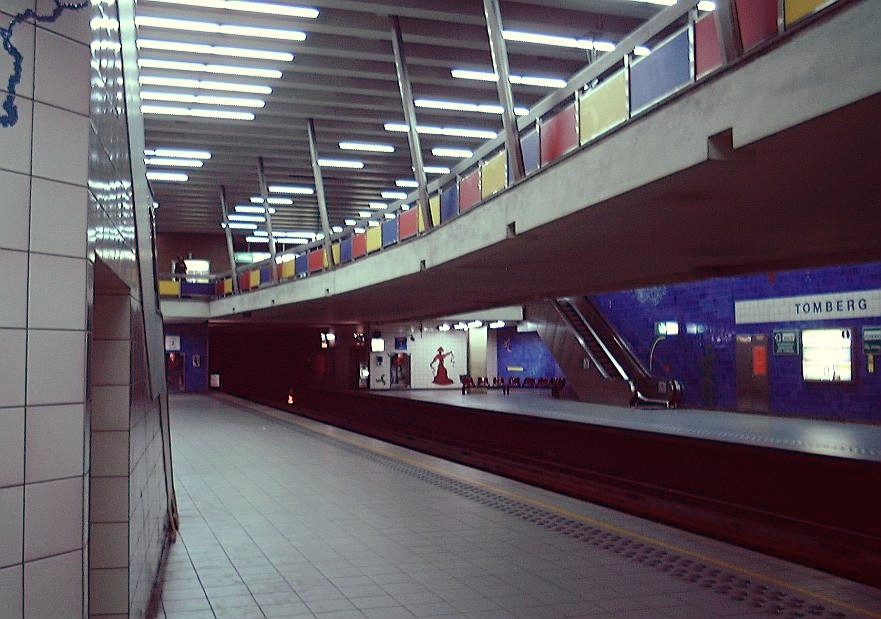
- Tomberg metro station

General information
- Location: Place du Tomberg / Tombergplein; 1200 Woluwe-Saint-Lambert, Brussels-Capital Region, Belgium
- Coordinates: 50°50′37″N 4°25′29″E
- Owner: STIB/MIVB
- Platforms: 2
- Tracks: 2

Construction
- Structure type: Underground

History
- Opened: 20 September 1976; 49 years ago

Services
Preceding station	Brussels Metro	Following station
Gribaumont towards Gare de l'Ouest/Weststation	Line 1	Roodebeek towards Stockel/Stokkel
Location

Tomberg is a Brussels Metro station on the eastern branch of line 1. It is located in the municipality of Woluwe-Saint-Lambert, in the eastern part of Brussels, Belgium; one of the entrances of the station is directly beneath the Municipal Hall.

The metro station opened on 20 January 1976. Until 1982 (when the line was extended to Alma), it was the eastern terminus of line 1B. Since 4 April 2009, the station has been served by the eastern branch of line 1 (previously line 1B).

== See also ==
- Transport in Brussels
- History of Brussels
