= List of Brussels Metro stations =

This list of Brussels metro and premetro stations includes all the underground stations in the Brussels metro and premetro network, arranged by line. The premetro refers to sections of the Brussels tramway network which run underground and at metro frequency.

== Line 1 ==
Line 1 replaces former Line 1B since 4 April 2009. Line 1 does not service though the stations between Erasme/Erasmus and Jacques Brel, which are now serviced by Line 5.

#	Name in French	Name in Dutch	Opened	Interchange	Coordinates
1	Gare de l'Ouest	Weststation	1982	NMBS/SNCB, Line 2, Line 5, Line 6	50°50′56″N 4°19′15″E
2	Beekkant	Beekkant	1981	Line 2, Line 5, Line 6	50°51′13″N 4°19′22″E
3	Étangs Noirs	Zwarte Vijvers	1981	Line 5	50°51′25″N 4°19′57″E
4	Comte de Flandre	Graaf van Vlaanderen	1981	Line 5	50°51′17″N 4°20′24″E
5	Sainte-Catherine	Sint-Katelijne	1977	Line 5	50°51′08″N 4°20′52″E
6	De Brouckère	De Brouckère	1976	Line 3, Line 4, Line 5	50°51′03″N 4°21′08″E
7	Gare Centrale	Centraal Station	1976	Line 5, NMBS/SNCB	50°50′44″N 4°21′25″E
8	Parc	Park	1976	Line 5	50°50′48″N 4°21′45″E
9	Arts-Loi	Kunst-Wet	1976	Line 2, Line 5, Line 6	50°50′44″N 4°22′07″E
10	Maelbeek	Maalbeek	1976	Line 5	50°50′38″N 4°22′35″E
11	Schuman	Schuman	1976	Line 5, NMBS/SNCB	50°50′34″N 4°22′54″E
12	Mérode	Mérode	1976	Line 5, NMBS/SNCB	50°50′22″N 4°23′52″E
13	Montgomery	Montgomery	1976	None, Outer Ring Axis, Line 7	50°50′16″N 4°24′25″E
14	Joséphine-Charlotte	Joséphine-Charlotte	1976	None	50°50′24″N 4°24′46″E
15	Gribaumont	Gribaumont	1976	None	50°50′33″N 4°25′3″E
16	Tomberg	Tomberg	1976	None	50°50′37″N 4°25′29″E
17	Roodebeek	Roodebeek	1982	None	50°50′51″N 4°26′9″E
18	Vandervelde	Vandervelde	1982	None	50°50′51″N 4°26′54″E
19	Alma	Alma	1982	None	50°51′58″N 4°27′09″E
20	Crainhem	Kraainem	1988	None	50°50′56″N 4°27′30″E
21	Stockel	Stokkel	1988	None	50°50′29″N 4°27′52″E

== Line 2 ==
Line 2 was expanded in April 2009 in order to connect the stations Delacroix and Gare de l'Ouest/Weststation. In this way the line now forms a loop between starting and ending in the Simonis/Elisabeth station complex, known as Simonis on its upper level and Elisabeth on its lower level. Most of this line (between Yser/IJzer and Brussels-South railway station) runs under the Brussels small ring.

#	Name in French	Name in Dutch	Opened	Interchange	Coordinates
1	Simonis	Simonis	1982	NMBS/SNCB, Line 2, Line 6, Line 6	50°51′47″N 4°19′50″E
2	Osseghem	Ossegem	1982	Line 6	50°51′25″N 4°19′30″E
3	Beekkant	Beekkant	1981	Line 1, Line 5, Line 6	50°51′13″N 4°19′22″E
4	Gare de l'Ouest	Weststation	1982	NMBS/SNCB, Line 1, Line 5, Line 6	50°50′56″N 4°19′15″E
5	Delacroix	Delacroix	2006	Line 6	50°50′42″N 4°19′28″E
6	Clemenceau	Clemenceau	1993	Line 6	50°50′28″N 4°19′50″E
7	Gare du Midi	Zuidstation	1988	NMBS/SNCB, Thalys, Eurostar, ICE, Line 2, Line 4, Line 6	50.835161°N 4.335222°E
8	Porte de Hal	Hallepoort	1988	Line 6	50°50′1″N 4°20′36″E
9	Hôtel des Monnaies	Munthof	1988	Line 6	50°50′0″N 4°20′58″E
10	Louise	Louiza	1988	Line 6	50°50′18″N 4°21′44″E
11	Porte de Namur	Naamsepoort	1988	Line 6	50°50′18″N 4°21′44″E
12	Trône	Troon	1988	Line 6	50°50′28″N 4°21′59″E
13	Arts-Loi	Kunst-Wet	1988	Line 1, Line 5, Line 6	50°50′44″N 4°22′07″E
14	Madou	Madou	1988	Line 6	50°51′0″N 4°22′8″E
15	Botanique	Kruidtuin	1988	Line 6	50°51′13″N 4°21′57″E
16	Rogier	Rogier	1988	Line 3, Line 4, Line 6	50°51′13″N 4°21′57″E
17	Yser	IJzer	1988	Line 6	50°51′26″N 4°21′6″E
18	Ribaucourt	Ribaucourt	1988	Line 6	50°51′47″N 4°19′50″E
19	Elisabeth	Elisabeth	1988	NMBS/SNCB, Line 2, Line 6, Line 6	50°51′47″N 4°19′50″E

== Line 5 ==
The Line 5 replaces the former Line 1A since 4 April 2009 between Herrmann-Debroux and Beekkant. The section of former Line 1A between Beekkant and King Baudouin is now serviced by Line 6. The section of Line 5 between Beekkant and Erasme/Erasmus was formerly serviced by Line 1B.

#	Name in French	Name in Dutch	Opened	Interchange	Coordinates
1	Erasme	Erasmus	2003	None	50°48′54″N 4°16′0″E
2	Eddy Merckx	Eddy Merckx	2003	None	50°49′00″N 4°16′31″E
3	CERIA	COOVI	2003	None	50°48′58″N 4°17′24″E
4	La Roue	Het Rad	2003	None	50°49′15″N 4°17′37″E
5	Bizet	Bizet	1992	None	50°49′30″N 4°17′52″E
6	Veeweyde	Veeweide	1985	None	50°49′42″N 4°18′0″E
7	Saint-Guidon	Sint-Guido	1982	None	50°51′03″N 4°21′08″E
8	Aumale	Aumale	1982	None	50°50′22″N 4°18′44″E
9	Jacques Brel	Jacques Brel	1982	None	50°50′42″N 4°19′07″E
10	Gare de l'Ouest	Weststation	1982	NMBS/SNCB, Line 1, Line 2, Line 6	50°50′56″N 4°19′15″E
11	Beekkant	Beekkant	1981	Line 1, Line 2, Line 6	50°51′13″N 4°19′22″E
12	Étangs Noirs	Zwarte Vijvers	1981	Line 1	50°51′25″N 4°19′57″E
13	Comte de Flandre	Graaf van Vlaanderen	1981	Line 1	50°51′17″N 4°20′24″E
14	Sainte-Catherine	Sint-Katelijne	1977	Line 1	50°51′08″N 4°20′52″E
15	De Brouckère	De Brouckère	1976	Line 1, Line 3, Line 4	50°51′03″N 4°21′08″E
16	Gare Centrale	Centraal Station	1976	Line 1, NMBS/SNCB	50°50′44″N 4°21′25″E
17	Parc	Park	1976	Line 1	50°50′48″N 4°21′45″E
18	Arts-Loi	Kunst-Wet	1976	Line 1, Line 2, Line 6	50°50′44″N 4°22′07″E
19	Maelbeek	Maalbeek	1976	Line 1	50°50′38″N 4°22′35″E
20	Schuman	Schuman	1976	Line 1, NMBS/SNCB	50°50′34″N 4°22′54″E
21	Mérode	Mérode	1976	Line 1, NMBS/SNCB	50°50′22″N 4°23′52″E
22	Thieffry	Thieffry	1976	None	50°49′58″N 4°24′6″E
23	Pétillon	Pétillon	1976	None	50°49′38″N 4°24′13″E
24	Hankar	Hankar	1976	None	50°49′38″N 4°24′13″E
25	Delta	Delta	1976	NMBS/SNCB	50°49′08″N 4°24′15″E
26	Beaulieu	Beaulieu	1976	None	50°48′54″N 4°24′34″E
27	Demey	Demey	1977	None	50°48′48″N 4°25′15″E
28	Herrmann-Debroux	Herrmann-Debroux	1985	None	50°48′45″N 4°25′41″E

== Line 6 ==
Line 6 replaces the former Line 1A between Beekkant and King Baudouin since 4 April 2009. It also runs under the Brussels small ring as does Line 2.

#	Name in French	Name in Dutch	Opened	Interchange	Coordinates
1	Roi Baudouin	Koning Boudewijn	1998	None	50°53′47″N 4°19′40″E
2	Heysel	Heizel	1985	Line 7	50°53′47″N 4°20′12″E
3	Houba-Brugmann	Houba-Brugmann	1985	None	50°53′25″N 4°20′13″E
4	Stuyvenbergh	Stuyvenbergh	1985	None	50°53′10″N 4°20′30″E
5	Bockstael	Bockstael	1982	NMBS/SNCB	50°52′39″N 4°20′51″E
6	Pannenhuis	Pannenhuis	1982	NMBS/SNCB (Tour et Taxis)	50°52′22″N 4°20′31″E
7	Belgica	Belgica	1982	None	50°52′4″N 4°20′10″E
8	Simonis	Simonis	1982	NMBS/SNCB, Line 2, Line 2, Line 6	50°51′47″N 4°19′50″E
9	Osseghem	Ossegem	1982	Line 2	50°51′25″N 4°19′30″E
10	Beekkant	Beekkant	1981	Line 1, Line 2, Line 5	50°51′13″N 4°19′22″E
11	Gare de l'Ouest	Weststation	1982	NMBS/SNCB, Line 1, Line 2, Line 5	50°50′56″N 4°19′15″E
12	Delacroix	Delacroix	2006	Line 2	50°50′42″N 4°19′28″E
13	Clemenceau	Clemenceau	1993	Line 2	50°50′28″N 4°19′50″E
14	Gare du Midi	Zuidstation	1988	NMBS/SNCB, Thalys, Eurostar, ICE, Line 2, Line 3, Line 4	50.835161°N 4.335222°E
15	Porte de Hal	Hallepoort	1988	Line 2	50°50′1″N 4°20′36″E
16	Hôtel des Monnaies	Munthof	1988	Line 2	50°50′0″N 4°20′58″E
17	Louise	Louiza	1988	Line 2	50°50′18″N 4°21′44″E
18	Porte de Namur	Naamsepoort	1988	Line 2	50°50′18″N 4°21′44″E
19	Trône	Troon	1988	Line 2	50°50′28″N 4°21′59″E
20	Arts-Loi	Kunst-Wet	1988	Line 1, Line 2, Line 5	50°50′44″N 4°22′07″E
21	Madou	Madou	1988	Line 2	50°51′0″N 4°22′8″E
22	Botanique	Kruidtuin	1988	Line 2	50°51′13″N 4°21′57″E
23	Rogier	Rogier	1988	Line 2, Line 3, Line 4	50°51′13″N 4°21′57″E
24	Yser	IJzer	1988	Line 2	50°51′26″N 4°21′6″E
25	Ribaucourt	Ribaucourt	1988	Line 2	50°51′47″N 4°19′50″E
26	Elisabeth	Elisabeth	1988	NMBS/SNCB, Line 2, Line 2, Line 6	50°51′47″N 4°19′50″E

== North-South Axis ==
The Brussels tram routes 3 and 4 use the North-South Axis and run on surface outside the city centre. The common section offers a high service frequency during daytime hours between Vanderkindere in the municipality of Uccle and the Brussels-North railway station. It shares 4 connections with metro lines and also links two major train stations with access to Thalys and Eurostar trains at Brussels-South railway station.

#	Name in French	Name in Dutch	Opened	Interchange	Coordinates
1	Gare du Nord	Noordstation	1976	NMBS/SNCB	
2	Rogier	Rogier	1976	Line 2, Line 6	50°51′13″N 4°21′57″E
3	De Brouckère	De Brouckère	1976	Line 1, Line 5	50°51′03″N 4°21′08″E
4	Bourse	Beurs	1976	None	
5	Anneessens	Anneessens	1976	None	
6	Lemonnier	Lemonnier	1976	None	
7	Gare du Midi	Zuidstation	1988	NMBS/SNCB, Thalys, Eurostar, ICE, Line 2, Line 6	50.835161°N 4.335222°E
8	Porte de Hal	Hallepoort	1988	Line 2, Line 6	50°50′1″N 4°20′36″E
9	Parvis de Saint-Gilles	Sint-Gillis Voorplein	1993	None	
10	Horta	Horta	1993	None	
11	Albert	Albert	1993	None	

== Greater Ring Axis ==
The Greater Ring Axis is an underground section under the greater ring of Brussels used by tram routes 7, and 25.

#	Name in French	Name in Dutch	Opened	Interchange	Coordinates
1	Diamant	Diamant	1972	None	
2	Georges Henri	Georges Henri	1975	None	
3	Montgomery	Montgomery	1975	Line 1	
4	Boileau	Boileau	1975	None	
