= Hankar metro station =

Metro station in Brussels, Belgium

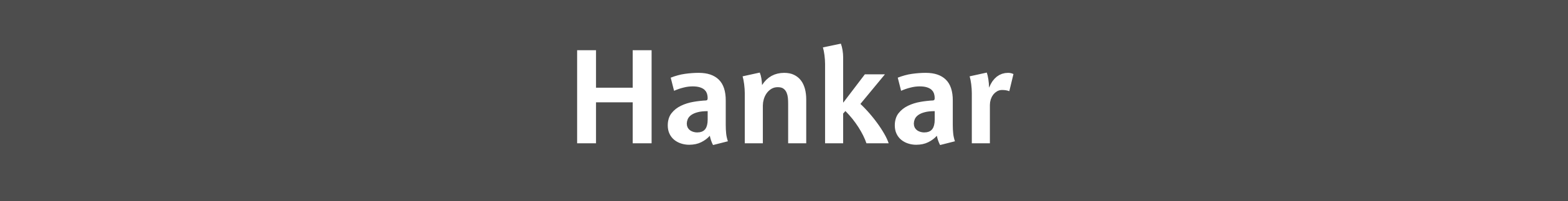

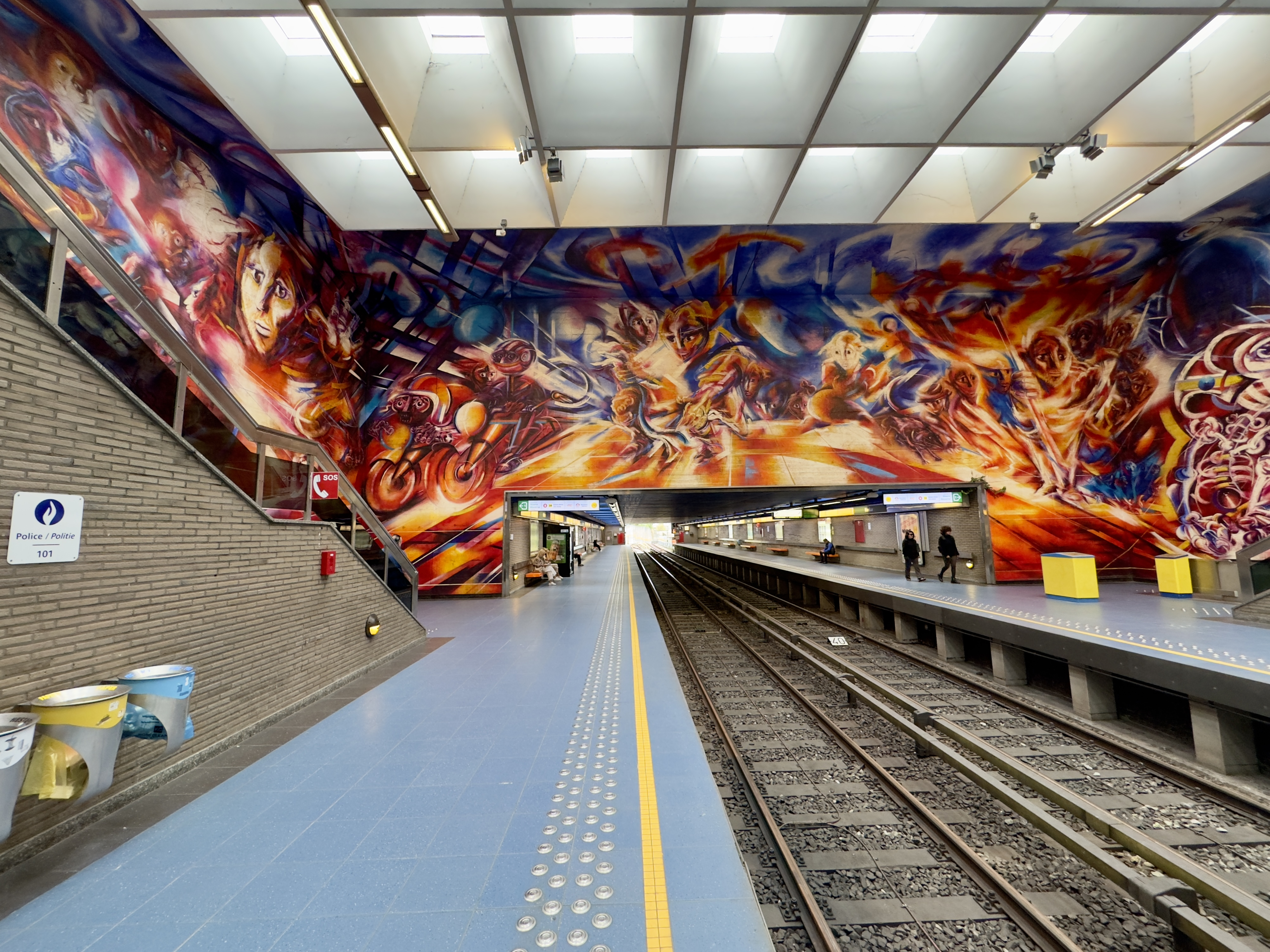
- Hankar metro station

General information
- Location: Chaussée de Wavre / Waversesteenweg; 1160 Auderghem, Brussels-Capital Region, Belgium
- Coordinates: 50°49′18″N 4°24′20″E
- Owner: STIB/MIVB
- Platforms: 2
- Tracks: 2

Construction
- Structure type: At grade

History
- Opened: 20 September 1976; 50 years ago

Services
Preceding station	Brussels Metro	Following station
Pétillon towards Erasme/Erasmus	Line 5	Delta towards Herrmann-Debroux
Location

Hankar (French pronunciation: [ɑ̃kaʁ]) is a Brussels Metro station on the eastern branch of line 5. It is located in the municipality of Auderghem, in the south-eastern part of Brussels, Belgium. It is named after the Square Baron Robert Hankar/Baron Robert Hankarsquare.

The metro station opened on 20 September 1976. Then, following the reorganisation of the Brussels Metro on 4 April 2009, it is served by the extended east–west line 5.

The station features a giant mural by Roger Somville.

== See also ==
- Transport in Brussels
- History of Brussels
