= Brussels Metro line 5 =

Metro line in Brussels, Belgium

- Map of line 5 in Brussels

Overview
- Native name: Ligne 5 (French); Metrolijn 5 (Dutch)
- Locale: Brussels
- Termini: Erasme/Erasmus; Herrmann-Debroux
- Stations: 28

Service
- Type: Rapid transit
- System: Brussels Metro
- Operator: STIB/MIVB
- Rolling stock: U4, U5, BOA M6 (sometimes)

History
- Opened: 4 April 2009; 17 years ago

Technical
- Line length: 17.3 km (10.7 mi)
- Track gauge: 1,435 mm (4 ft 8 1/2 in) standard gauge
- Electrification: 900 V DC (third rail)

Line 5 is a rapid transit line on the Brussels Metro in Belgium operated by STIB/MIVB. It connects Herrmann-Debroux in the south-east of Brussels to Erasme/Erasmus in the south-west via the city centre. It has existed in its current form since 4 April 2009, when the section of former line 1A between Beekkant and Roi Baudouin/Koning Boudewijn was replaced by the section of former line 1B between Beekkant and Erasme. Starting from Herrmann-Debroux, the line crosses the municipalities of Auderghem, Etterbeek, City of Brussels, Molenbeek-Saint-Jean, Koekelberg and Anderlecht. It serves 28 metro stations and has a common section with line 1 between Gare de l'Ouest/Weststation and Merode, and with lines 2 and 6 between Gare de l'Ouest and Beekkant. At Arts-Loi/Kunst-Wet, the line also connects with lines 2 and 6. Railway connections are possible at Brussels-Central, Brussels-Schuman, Merode and Brussels-West.

The first section of this line was built in the late 1960s between Schuman and De Brouckère, but was served by trams. The first metro was brought into service on 20 September 1976, and the existing underground section was extended up to Tomberg on former line 1B, and up to Beaulieu on former line 1A. Line 1A was further expanded eastwards, to Demey in 1977 and to Herrmann-Debroux in 1985. The line was also expanded westwards, to Sainte-Catherine/Sint-Katelijne in 1977, to Beekkant in 1981, to Bockstael in 1982, to Heysel/Heizel in 1985 and to Roi Baudouin in 1998.
