= Clemenceau metro station =

Metro station in Brussels, Belgium

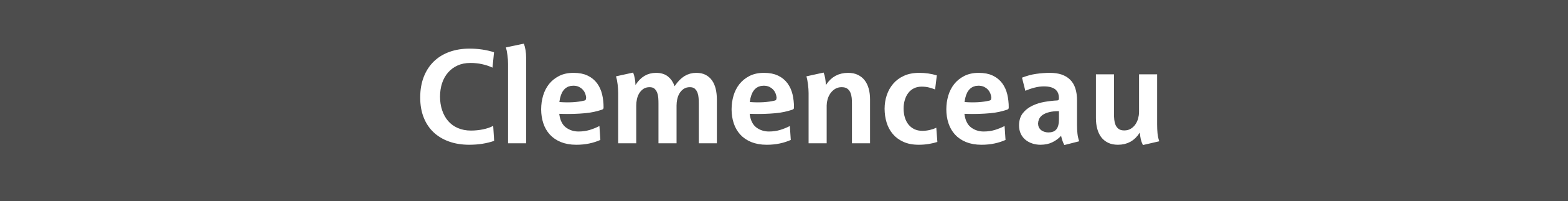

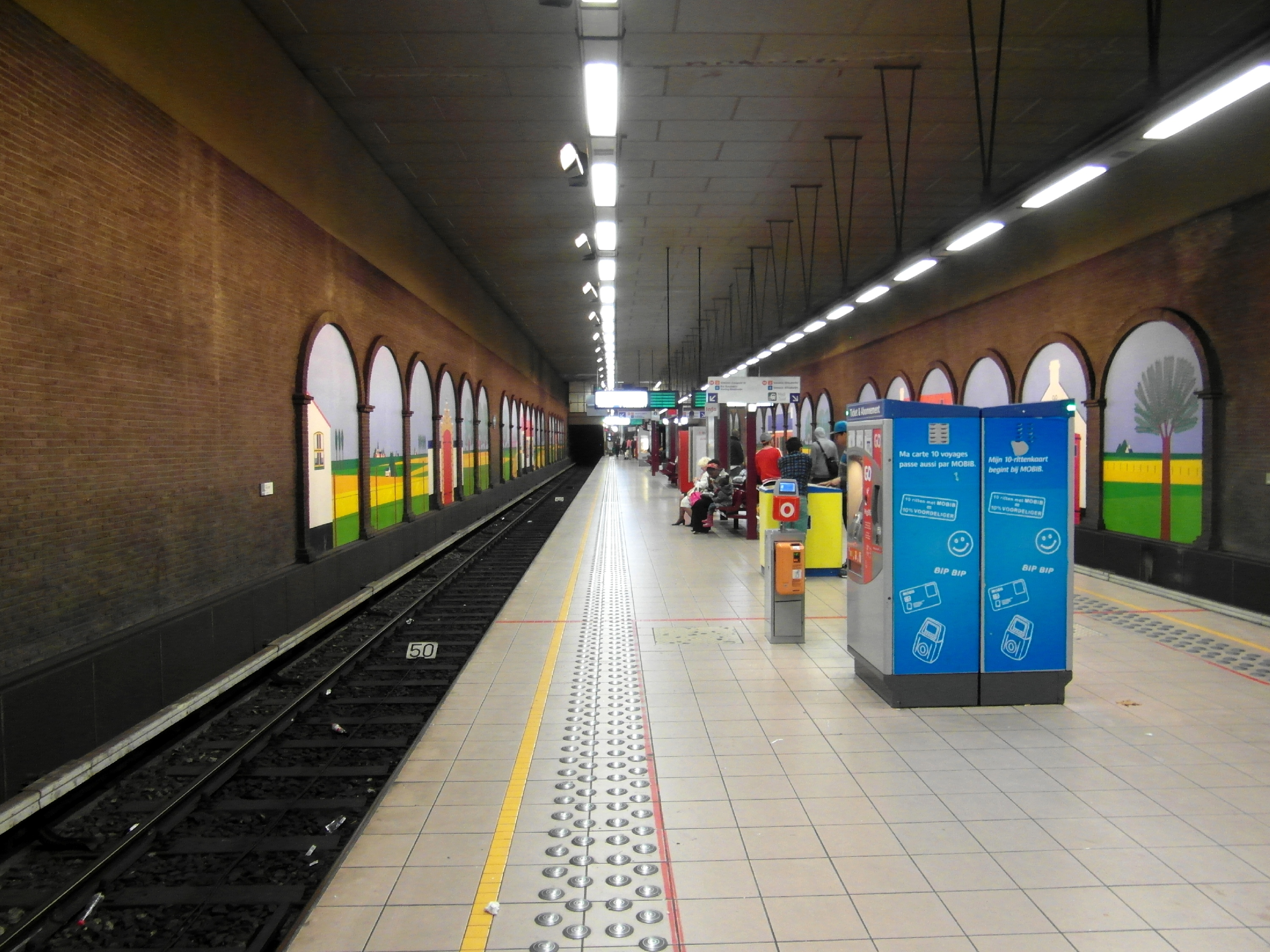
- Clemenceau metro station

General information
- Location: Rue Jorez / Jorezstraat; 1070 Anderlecht, Brussels-Capital Region, Belgium
- Coordinates: 50°50′28″N 4°19′50″E
- Owner: STIB/MIVB
- Platforms: 1 island platform
- Tracks: 2

Construction
- Structure type: Underground

History
- Opened: 18 June 1993; 33 years ago

Services
Preceding station	Brussels Metro	Following station
Gare du Midi/Zuidstation towards Elisabeth	Line 2	Delacroix towards Simonis
Gare du Midi/Zuidstation towards Elisabeth	Line 6	Delacroix towards King Baudouin
Location

Clemenceau (French pronunciation: [klemɑ̃so]) is a Brussels Metro station on the southern segment of lines 2 and 6. It is located under the Rue Jorez/Jorezstraat, close to the Avenue Clemenceau/Clemenceaulaan, in the municipality of Anderlecht, in the western part of Brussels, Belgium. The station takes its name from that nearby avenue, itself named after Georges Clemenceau, a former Prime Minister of France.

The metro station opened on 18 June 1993 and was the terminus of line 2 until the opening of an extension to Delacroix on 4 September 2006. On 4 April 2009, the "loop" of line 2 was completed with the junction between Delacroix and Gare de l'Ouest/Weststation. Following the reorganisation of the Brussels Metro on that occasion, it now lies on the joint section of lines 2 and 6.

== See also ==
- Transport in Brussels
- History of Brussels
