= Brussels Metro line 1 =

Metro line in Brussels, Belgium

- Map of line 1 in Brussels

Overview
- Native name: Ligne 1 (French); Metrolijn 1 (Dutch)
- Locale: Brussels
- Termini: Gare de l'Ouest/Weststation; Stokkel/Stockel
- Stations: 21

Service
- Type: Rapid transit
- System: Brussels Metro
- Operator: STIB/MIVB
- Depot: Delta
- Rolling stock: BOA M6

History
- Opened: 4 April 2009; 17 years ago

Technical
- Line length: 12.5 km (7.8 mi)
- Track gauge: 1,435 mm (4 ft 8 1/2 in) standard gauge
- Electrification: 900 V DC (third rail)

Line 1 is a rapid transit line on the Brussels Metro in Belgium operated by STIB/MIVB. It has existed in its current form since 4 April 2009, when former line 1B, which ran between Stockel/Stokkel and Erasme/Erasmus, was shortened to Gare de l'Ouest/Weststation. The section between Gare de l'Ouest and Erasme is now served by line 5. The line serves 21 metro stations, and has a common section with line 5 between Gare de l'Ouest and Merode, and with lines 2 and 6 between Gare de l'Ouest and Beekkant. At Arts-Loi/Kunst-Wet, the line also connects with lines 2 and 6. Railway connections are possible at Brussels-Central, Brussels-Schuman, Merode and Brussels-West. The line crosses the municipalities of Molenbeek-Saint-Jean, Koekelberg, City of Brussels, Etterbeek, Woluwe-Saint-Pierre and Woluwe-Saint-Lambert.

The first section of this line was built in the late 1960s between Schuman and De Brouckère, but was served by trams. The first metro was brought into service on 20 September 1976, and the existing underground section was extended up to Tomberg on former line 1B, and up to Beaulieu on former line 1A. Line 1B was later expanded westwards, to Sainte-Catherine/Sint-Katelijne in 1977, to Beekkant in 1981, to Saint-Guidon/Sint-Guido in 1982, to Veeweyde/Veeweide in 1985, to Bizet in 1992 and finally to Erasme in 2003. The line was also expanded eastwards, to Alma in 1982 and to Stockel in 1988.
