= Delacroix metro station =

Metro station in Brussels, Belgium

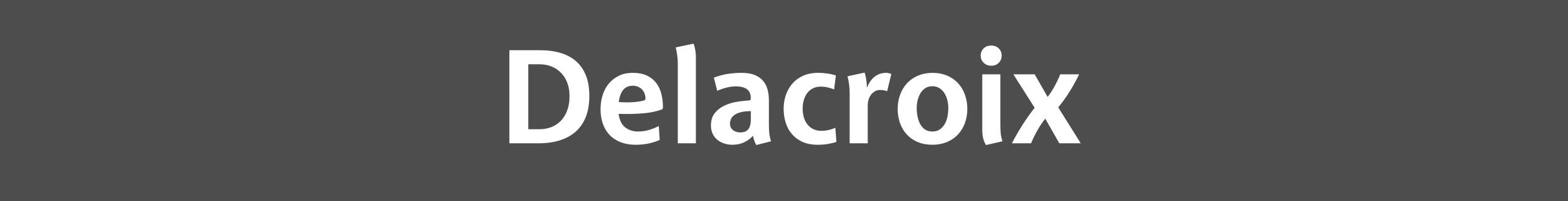

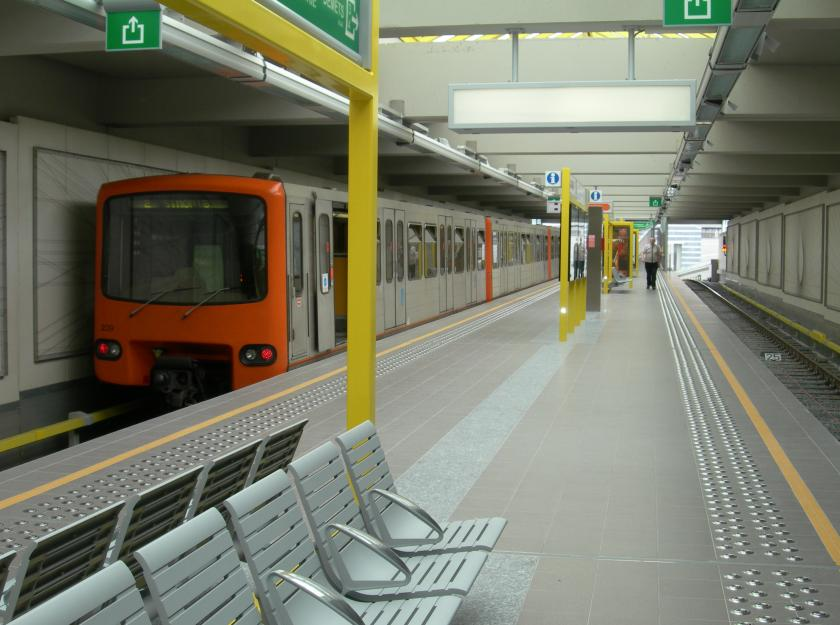
- Delacroix metro station

General information
- Location: Rue Léon Delacroix / Léon Delacroixstraat; 1070 Anderlecht, Brussels-Capital Region, Belgium
- Coordinates: 50°50′42″N 4°19′28″E
- Owner: STIB/MIVB
- Platforms: Island platform
- Tracks: 2

Construction
- Structure type: Elevated

History
- Opened: 4 September 2006; 20 years ago

Services
Preceding station	Brussels Metro	Following station
Clemenceau towards Elisabeth	Line 2	Gare de l'Ouest/Weststation towards Simonis
Clemenceau towards Elisabeth	Line 6	Gare de l'Ouest/Weststation towards King Baudouin
Location

Delacroix (French pronunciation: [dəlakʁwa]) is a Brussels Metro station on lines 2 and 6. It is located in the municipality of Anderlecht, in the western part of Brussels, Belgium. It is an elevated station, running parallel to the Rue Léon Delacroix/Léon Delacroixstraat, and forming a bridge-viaduct over the Brussels–Charleroi Canal, with entries and exits leading to and from both banks of the canal. The station takes its name from that nearby street, itself named after Léon Delacroix, Belgium's 22nd Prime Minister.

The metro station opened on 4 September 2006 as the southern terminus of line 2. On 4 April 2009, the "loop" of line 2 was completed with the junction between Delacroix and Gare de l'Ouest/Weststation. Following the reorganisation of the Brussels Metro on that occasion, it now lies on the joint section of lines 2 and 6.

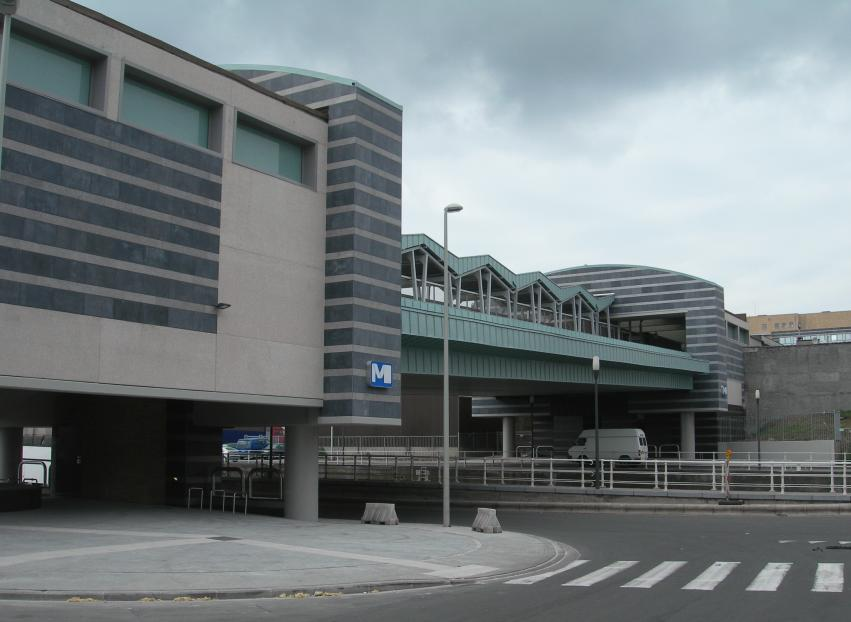
Elevated station over the canal with entrances at ground level

== See also ==
- Transport in Brussels
- History of Brussels
