= Brussels Metro line 2 =

Metro line in Brussels, Belgium

- Map of line 2 in Brussels

Overview
- Native name: Ligne 2 (French); Metrolijn 2 (Dutch)
- Locale: Brussels
- Termini: Simonis; Elisabeth
- Stations: 19

Service
- Type: Rapid transit
- System: Brussels Metro
- Operator: STIB/MIVB
- Depot: Jacques Brel
- Rolling stock: U5

History
- Opened: 2 October 1988; 37 years ago
- Last extension: 4 April 2009; 17 years ago

Technical
- Line length: 10.4 km (6.5 mi)
- Track gauge: 1,435 mm (4 ft 8 1/2 in) standard gauge
- Electrification: 900 V DC (third rail)

Line 2 is a rapid transit line on the Brussels Metro in Belgium operated by STIB/MIVB. It has existed in its current form since 4 April 2009, when the section between Delacroix and Gare de l'Ouest/Weststation was opened, which allowed to close the "loop" from and to Simonis/Elisabeth. The configuration of Simonis/Elisabeth though does not allow trains on line 2 to perform the loop several consecutive times in the same direction, i.e. a train running clockwise from Elisabeth will have to run counterclockwise from Simonis. The two termini of line 2 have thus received different names: originally Simonis (Elisabeth) and Simonis (Leopold II), changed in November 2013 to Elisabeth and Simonis. Between Yser/IJzer and the Porte de Hal/Hallepoort, the line runs under the Small Ring (Brussels' inner ring road), which was itself built on the site of the former second walls of Brussels. The line crosses the municipalities of Koekelberg, Molenbeek-Saint-Jean, City of Brussels, Saint-Gilles and Anderlecht.

The first stations on the Small Ring were opened in 1970 with tramways connecting Rogier to Porte de Namur/Naamsepoort. Louise/Louiza was opened in 1985 and Simonis in 1986, but it was only in 1988 that the actual metro line 2 was first serviced with metros. The following stations also opened that year: Ribaucourt, Yser, Hôtel des Monnaies/Munthof, Porte de Hal and Gare du Midi/Zuidstation. The existing stations were converted in order to be serviced by metros. In 1993, the line was expanded to Clemenceau, and then to Delacroix in 2006. The route of line 2 is also currently served by line 6, which then continues from Simonis to Roi Baudouin/Koning Boudewijn.
