= Stockel metro station =

Eastern terminus of line 1 on the Brussels Metro

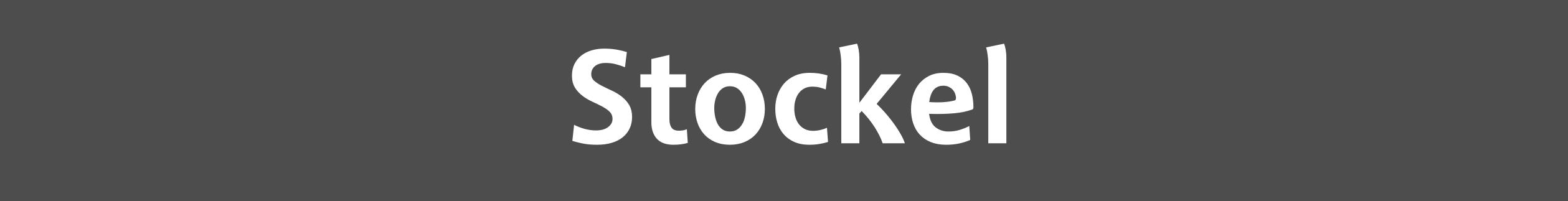
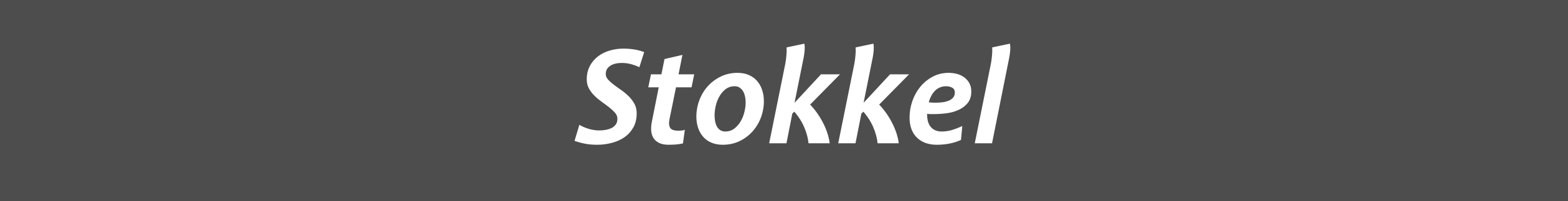

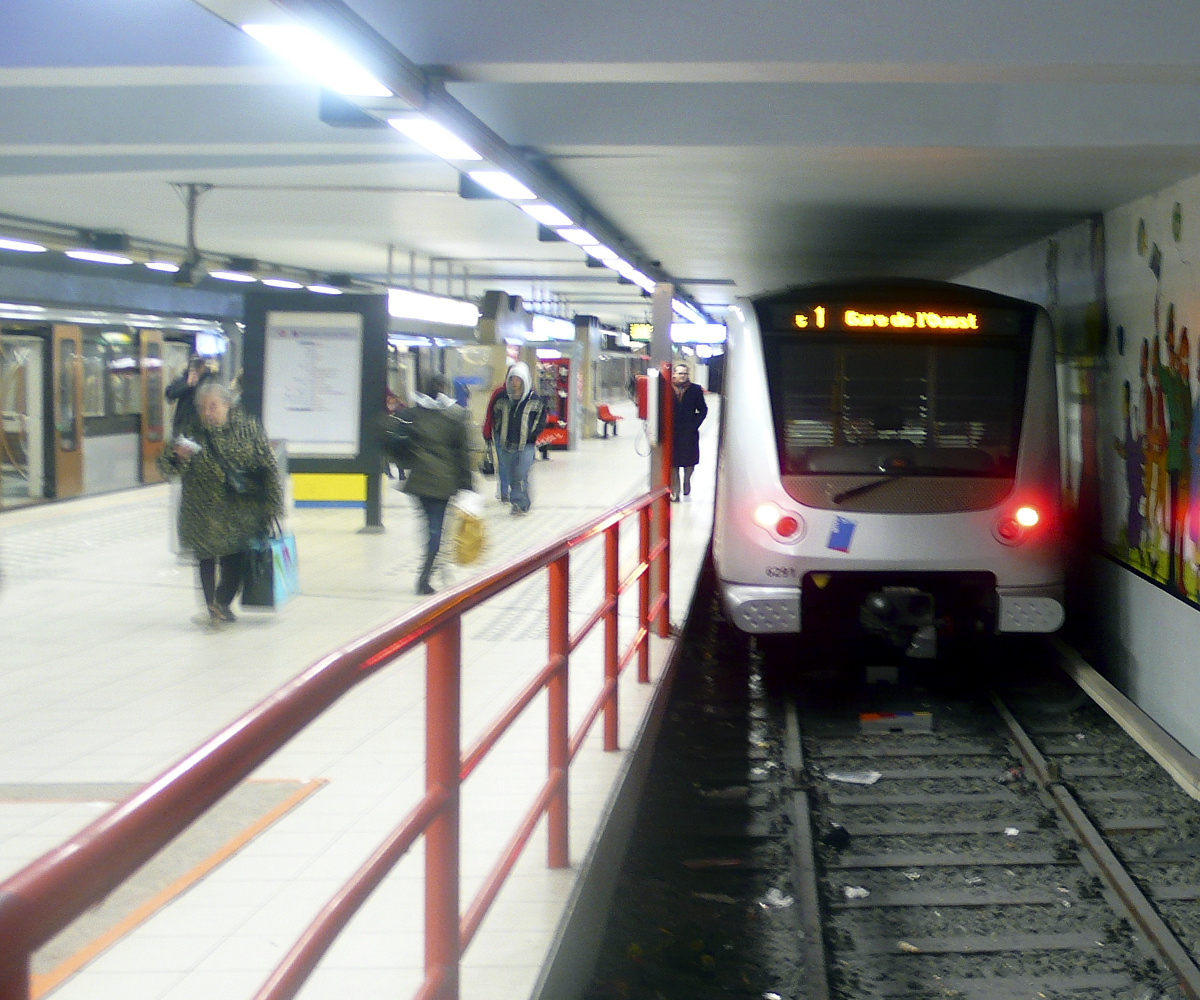
- Stockel/Stokkel metro station

General information
- Location: Avenue de Hinnisdael / Hinnisdaellaan; 1200 Woluwe-Saint-Lambert, Brussels-Capital Region, Belgium
- Coordinates: 50°50′29″N 4°27′52″E
- Owner: STIB/MIVB
- Platforms: 1 island platform
- Tracks: 2

Construction
- Structure type: Underground

History
- Opened: 31 August 1988; 38 years ago

Services
Preceding station	Brussels Metro	Following station
Kraainem/Crainhem towards Gare de l'Ouest/Weststation	Line 1	Terminus
Location

Stockel (French, former Dutch spelling) or Stokkel (modern Dutch) is a Brussels Metro station serving as the eastern terminus of line 1. It is located in the municipality of Woluwe-Saint-Pierre, in the eastern part of Brussels, Belgium.

The metro station opened on 31 August 1988. Since 4 April 2009, the station has been served by the eastern branch of line 1 (previously line 1B).

== Artworks ==
Murals on the walls across each of the tracks from the single island platform illustrate more than 140 characters from Hergé's comic The Adventures of Tintin. The sketches for the work were made by the artist himself, just before his death. The figures were drawn by Studio Hergé.

== Surroundings ==
Next to the metro station, there is a shopping centre named Stockel Square, home to various shops including clothing, jewellery, food, etc. In front of the station, there is also a cinema called Le New Stockel.

== See also ==
- Transport in Brussels
- History of Brussels
