= Brussels Metro line 6 =

Metro line in Brussels, Belgium

- Map of line 6 in Brussels

Overview
- Native name: Ligne 6 (French); Metrolijn 6 (Dutch)
- Locale: Brussels
- Termini: Roi Baudouin/Koning Boudewijn; Elisabeth
- Stations: 26

Service
- Type: Rapid transit
- System: Brussels Metro
- Operator: STIB/MIVB
- Depot: Jacques Brel
- Rolling stock: U5

History
- Opened: 4 April 2009; 17 years ago

Technical
- Line length: 15.5 km (9.6 mi)
- Track gauge: 1,435 mm (4 ft 8 1/2 in) standard gauge
- Electrification: 900 V DC (third rail)

Line 6 is a rapid transit line on the Brussels Metro in Belgium operated by STIB/MIVB. It connects Roi Baudouin/Koning Boudewijn in the north-west of Brussels to Simonis/Elisabeth to the north-west of the city centre, then performing a counterclockwise "loop" around the centre up to Simonis again. During this loop, the line runs under the Small Ring (Brussels' inner ring road), from Porte de Hal/Hallepoort to Yser/IJzer. It has existed in its current form since 4 April 2009, when it replaced former line 1A between Roi Baudouin and Beekkant. It serves 25 metro stations and has 26 stops, metros on that line stopping twice at Simonis. The Simonis-Elisabeth loop is also served by line 2. The line has also a common section with lines 1 and 5 between Gare de l'Ouest/Weststation and Beekkant. A connection with those lines is also possible at Arts-Loi/Kunst-Wet. Starting from Roi Baudouin, the line crosses the municipalities of the City of Brussels, Jette, Koekelberg, Molenbeek-Saint-Jean, Anderlecht and Saint-Gilles.
