= Arts-Loi metro station =

Metro station in Brussels, Belgium

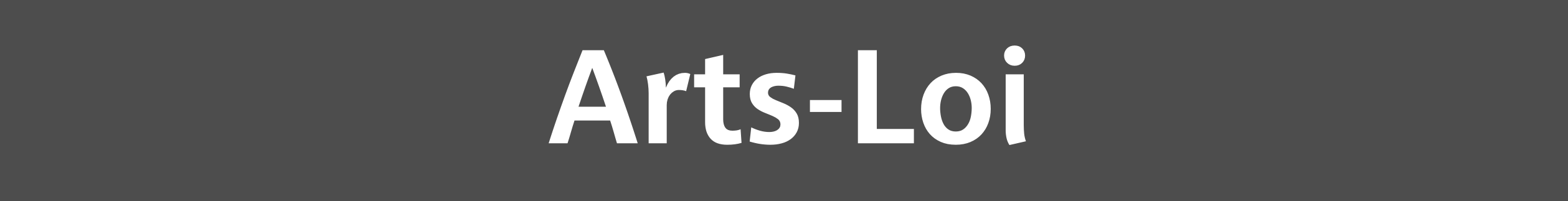
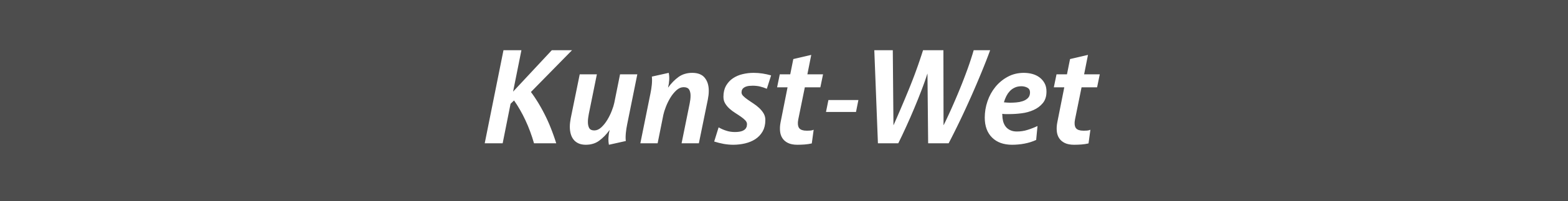

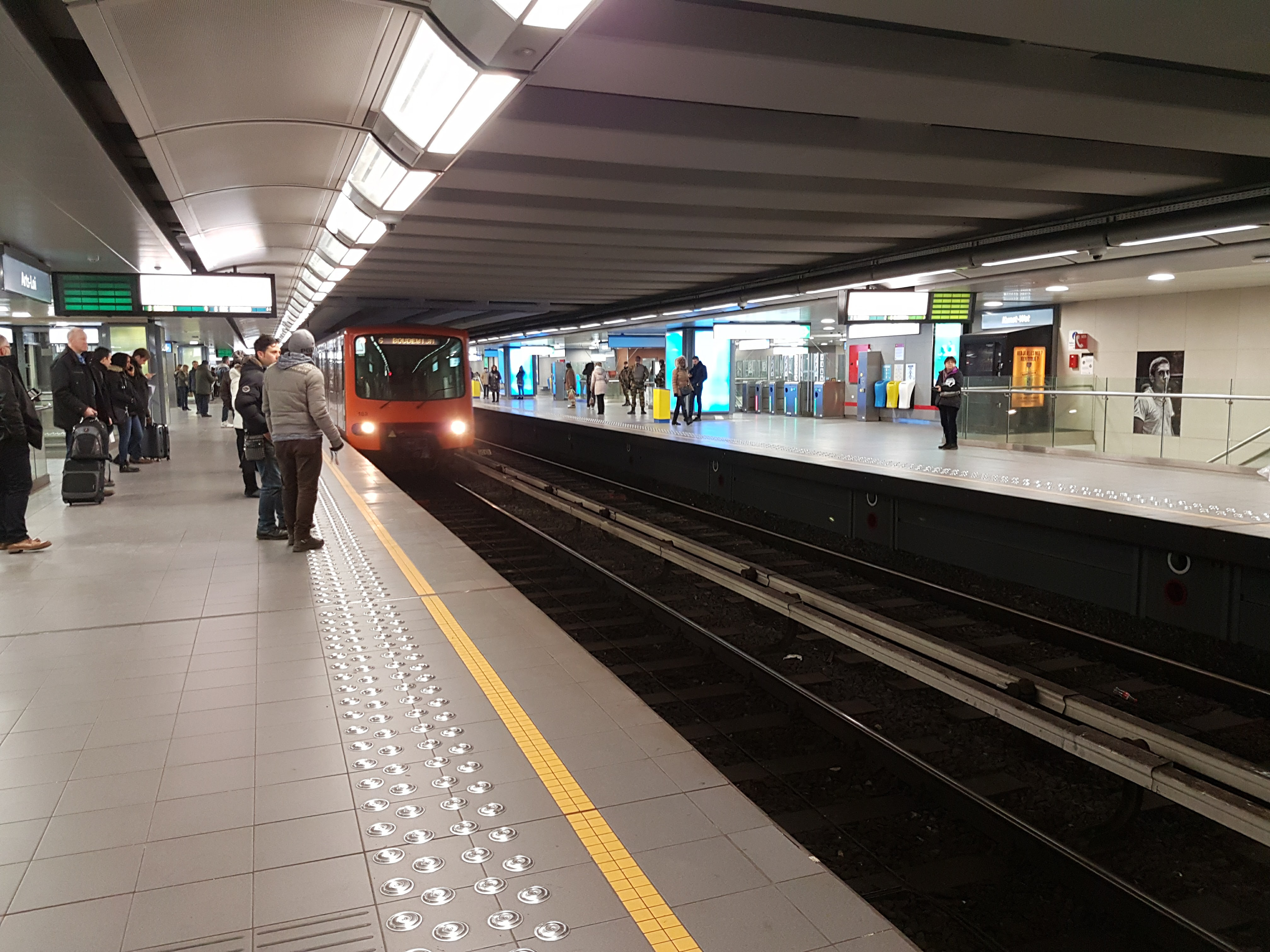
- Arts-Loi/Kunst-Wet metro station

General information
- Location: Rue de la Loi / Wetstraat; 1000 City of Brussels, Brussels-Capital Region, Belgium
- Coordinates: 50°50′44″N 4°22′07″E
- Owner: STIB/MIVB
- Platforms: 2 per level
- Tracks: 2 per level

Construction
- Structure type: Underground
- Platform levels: 2

History
- Opened: 17 December 1969; 56 years ago (premetro); 20 September 1976; 49 years ago (metro)

Services
Preceding station	Brussels Metro	Following station
Park towards Gare de l'Ouest/Weststation	Line 1	Maelbeek/Maalbeek towards Stockel/Stokkel
Madou towards Elisabeth	Line 2	Trône/Troon towards Simonis
Park towards Erasme/Erasmus	Line 5	Maelbeek/Maalbeek towards Herrmann-Debroux
Madou towards Elisabeth	Line 6	Trône/Troon towards King Baudouin
Location

Arts-Loi (French, pronounced [aʁ lwa]) or Kunst-Wet (Dutch, pronounced [kʏnst ʋɛt]) is a Brussels Metro station on lines 1, 2, 5 and 6. It is located in the City of Brussels, Belgium, under the intersection of the Rue de la Loi/Wetstraat (lit. 'Law Street') and the Avenue des Arts/Kunstlaan (lit. 'Art Avenue'), after which it is named, the latter street being part of the Small Ring (Brussels' inner ring road).

The station's lower level opened on 17 December 1969, under the name Arts/Kunst, as a premetro (underground tram) station on the tram line between De Brouckère and Schuman. Its name was changed to its current form in 1971. This station was upgraded to full metro status on 20 September 1976, serving former east–west line 1 (further split in 1982 into former lines 1A and 1B). The station was extended on 2 October 1988 with the opening of the line 2 station, located on the upper level. Then, following the reorganisation of the Brussels Metro on 4 April 2009, it is served by lines 1, 2, 5 and 6.

== See also ==
- Transport in Brussels
- History of Brussels
