= Trône metro station =

Metro station in Brussels, Belgium

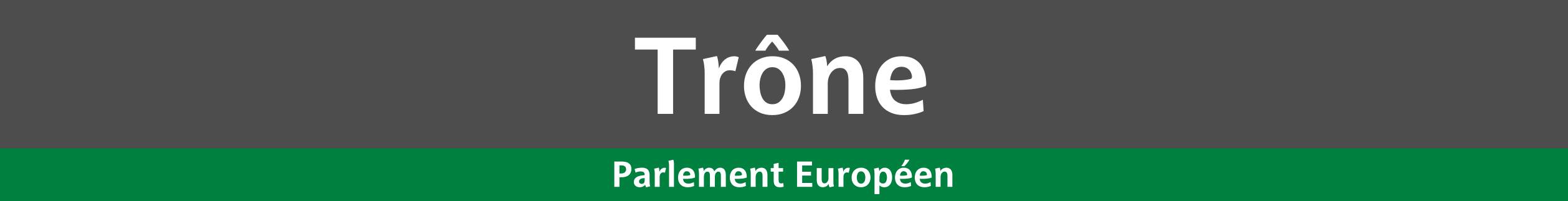
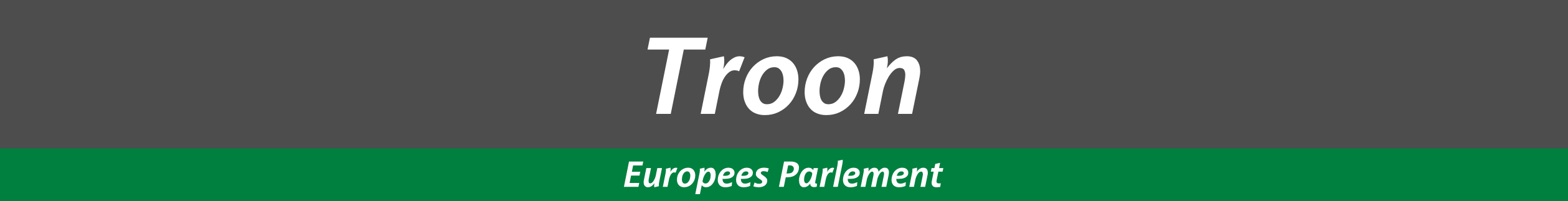

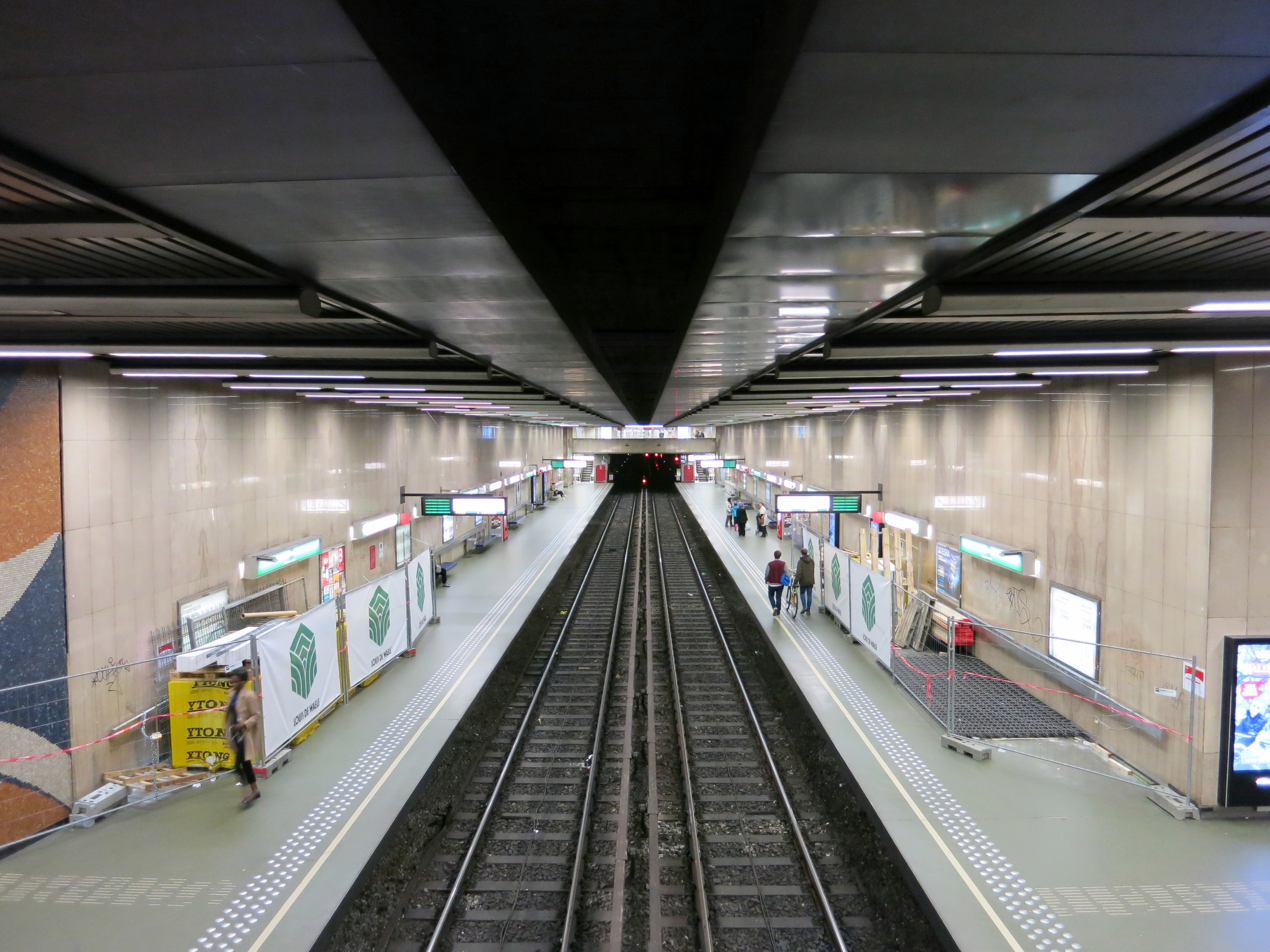
- Trône/Troon metro station

General information
- Location: Place du Trône / Troonplein; 1000 City of Brussels, Brussels-Capital Region, Belgium
- Coordinates: 50°50′28″N 4°21′59″E
- Owner: STIB/MIVB
- Platforms: 2
- Tracks: 2

Construction
- Structure type: Underground

History
- Opened: 20 December 1970; 55 years ago (premetro); 2 October 1988; 37 years ago (metro)

Services
Preceding station	Brussels Metro	Following station
Arts-Loi/Kunst-Wet towards Elisabeth	Line 2	Porte de Namur/Naamsepoort towards Simonis
Arts-Loi/Kunst-Wet towards Elisabeth	Line 6	Porte de Namur/Naamsepoort towards King Baudouin
Location

Trône (French, pronounced [tʁon]) or Troon (Dutch, pronounced [troːn]) is a Brussels Metro station on the southern segment of lines 2 and 6. It is located under the Small Ring (Brussels' inner ring road) at the Place du Trône/Troonplein, near the Royal Palace, in the City of Brussels, Belgium.

The station opened on 20 December 1970, under the name Luxembourg/Luxemburg, as a premetro (underground tram) station on the tram line between Madou and Porte de Namur/Naamsepoort. It became a heavy metro station when this line was converted on 2 October 1988 and its name was changed on that occasion to reflect the aboveground square. Then, following the reorganisation of the Brussels Metro on 4 April 2009, it now lies on the joint section of lines 2 and 6.

== See also ==
- Transport in Brussels
- History of Brussels
