= Botanique metro station =

Metro station in Brussels, Belgium

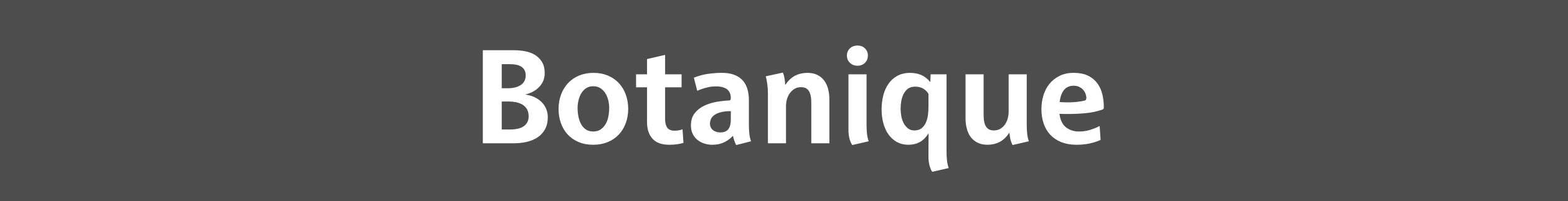
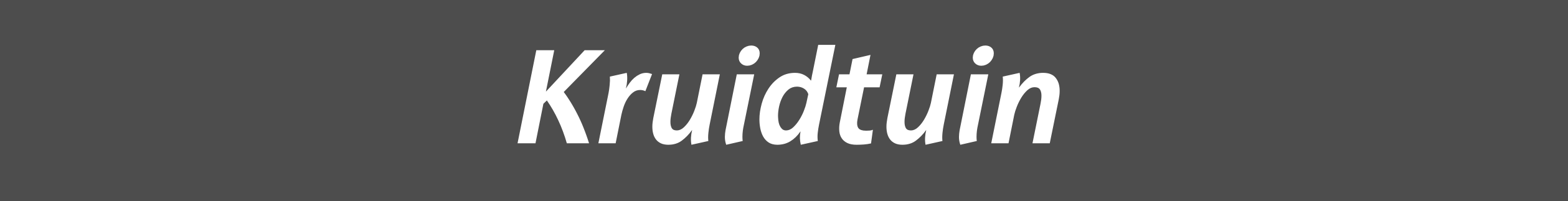

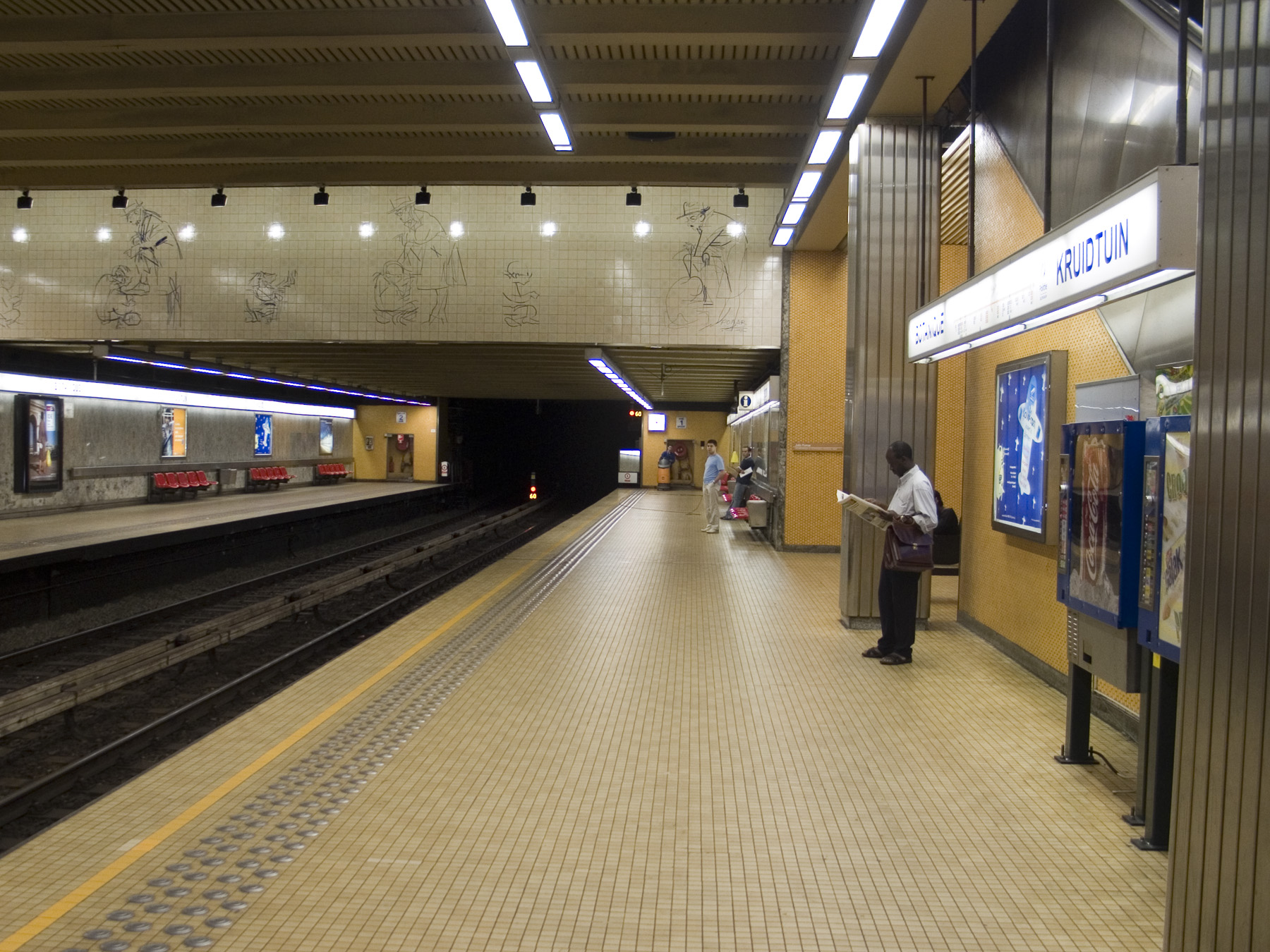
- Botanique/Kruidtuin metro station

General information
- Location: Rue Royale / Koningsstraat; 1210 Saint-Josse-ten-Noode, Brussels-Capital Region, Belgium
- Coordinates: 50°51′13″N 4°21′57″E
- Owner: STIB/MIVB
- Platforms: 2
- Tracks: 2

Construction
- Structure type: Underground

History
- Opened: 18 August 1974; 52 years ago (premetro); 2 October 1988; 37 years ago (metro)

Services
Preceding station	Brussels Metro	Following station
Rogier towards Elisabeth	Line 2	Madou towards Simonis
Rogier towards Elisabeth	Line 6	Madou towards King Baudouin
Location

Botanique (French, pronounced [bɔtanik]) or Kruidtuin (Dutch, pronounced [ˈkrœytœyn]) is a Brussels Metro station on the northern segment of lines 2 and 6. It is located under the Small Ring (Brussels' inner ring road) at the Rue Royale/Koningsstraat in the municipality of the Saint-Josse-ten-Noode, north of the City of Brussels, Belgium.

The station opened on 18 August 1974 as a premetro (underground tram) station. It became a heavy metro station, serving line 2, when this line was converted on 2 October 1988. Then, following the reorganisation of the Brussels Metro on 4 April 2009, it now lies on the joint section of lines 2 and 6.

The National Botanic Garden of Belgium, for which the area and station is named, was moved in the 1930s to the Flemish municipality of Meise, but the name Le Botanique and the building complex located nearby is still used as a concert venue and cultural centre.

== See also ==
- Transport in Brussels
- History of Brussels
