= Madou metro station =

Metro station in Brussels, Belgium

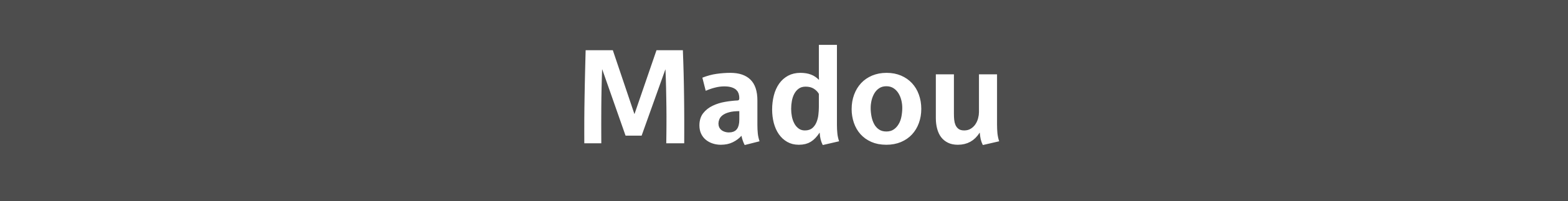

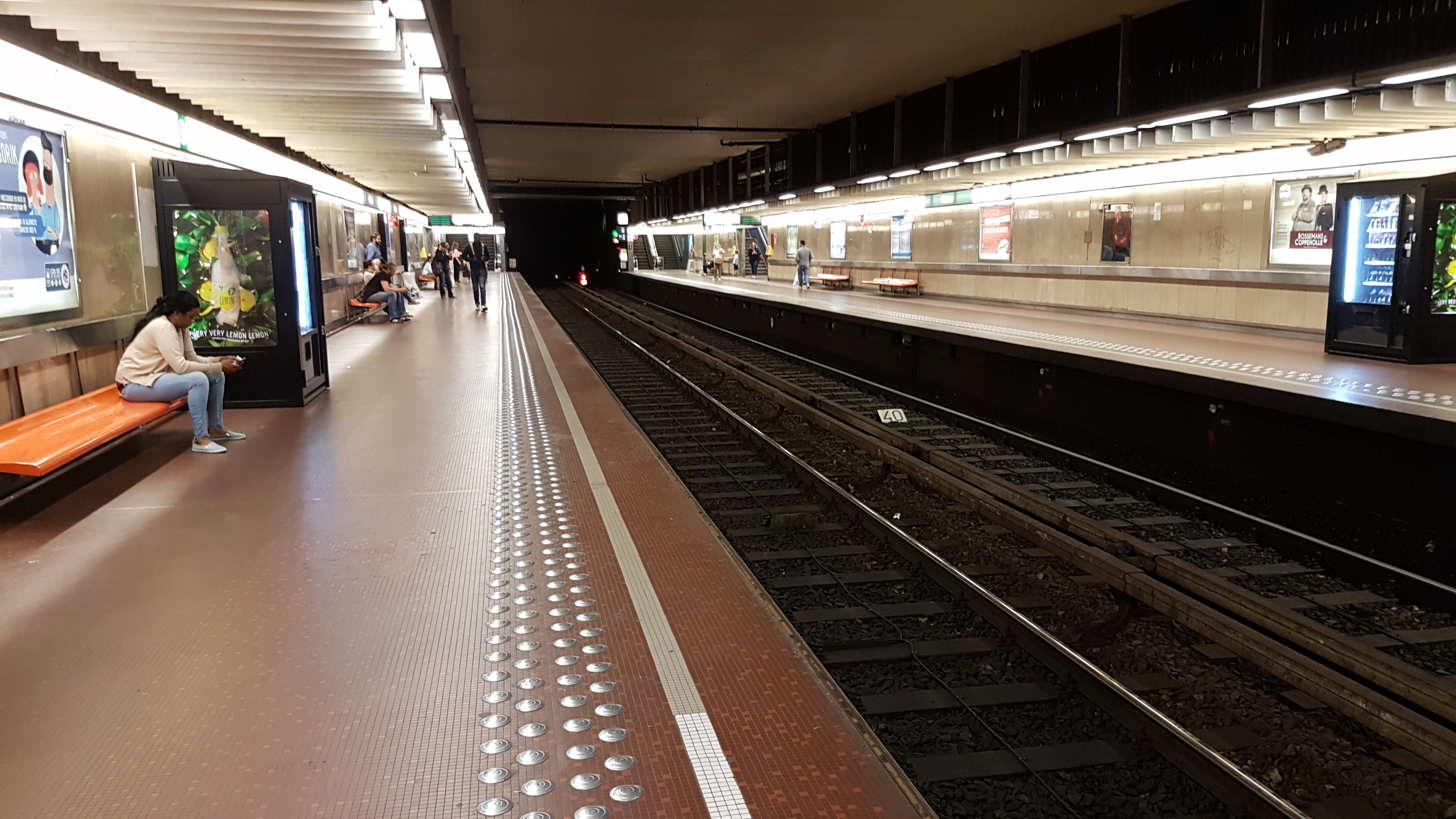
- Madou metro station

General information
- Location: Place Madou / Madouplein; 1210 Saint-Josse-ten-Noode, Brussels-Capital Region, Belgium
- Coordinates: 50°50′59″N 4°22′08″E
- Owner: STIB/MIVB
- Platforms: 2
- Tracks: 2

Construction
- Structure type: Underground

History
- Opened: 20 December 1970; 55 years ago (premetro); 2 October 1988; 37 years ago (metro)

Services
Preceding station	Brussels Metro	Following station
Botanique/Kruidtuin towards Elisabeth	Line 2	Arts-Loi/Kunst-Wet towards Simonis
Botanique/Kruidtuin towards Elisabeth	Line 6	Arts-Loi/Kunst-Wet towards King Baudouin
Location

Madou (French pronunciation: [madu]) is a Brussels Metro station on the northern segment of lines 2 and 6. It is located under the Small Ring (Brussels' inner ring road) at the Place Madou/Madouplein, next to Madou Plaza Tower, in the municipality of the Saint-Josse-ten-Noode, north of the City of Brussels, Belgium. The station takes its name from that aboveground square, itself named after the painter and lithographer Jean-Baptiste Madou.

The station opened on 20 December 1970 as a premetro (underground tram) station on the tram line between Madou and Porte de Namur/Naamsepoort. It became a heavy metro station, serving line 2, when this line was converted on 2 October 1988. Then, following the reorganisation of the Brussels Metro on 4 April 2009, it now lies on the joint section of lines 2 and 6.

== See also ==
- Transport in Brussels
- History of Brussels
