= Kraainem metro station =

Metro station in Brussels, Belgium

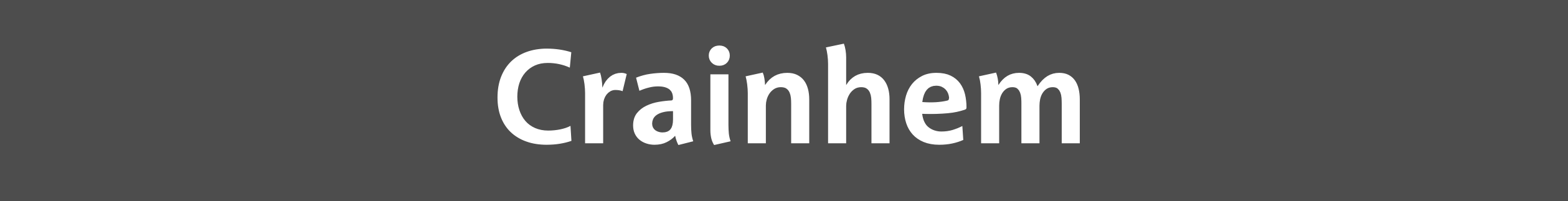
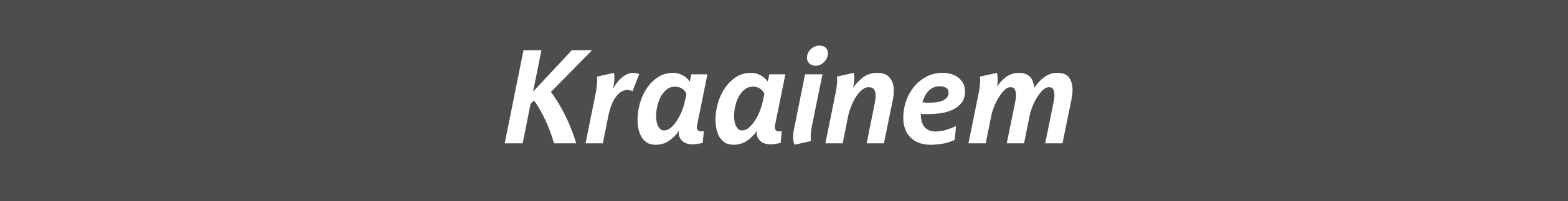

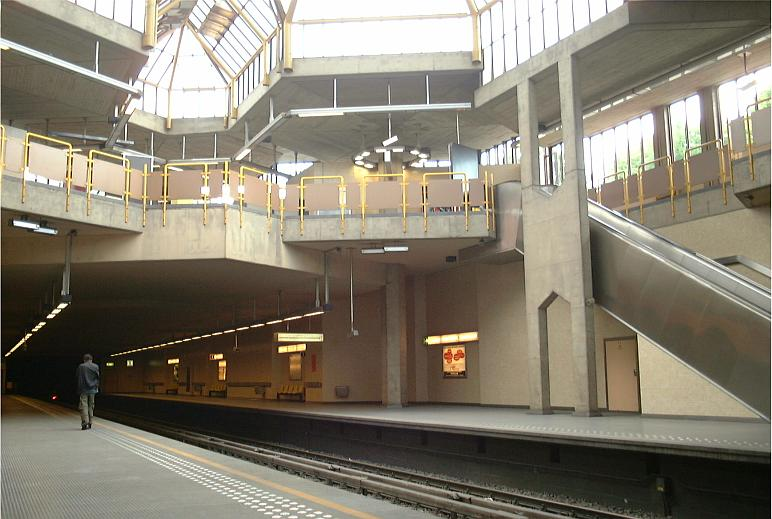
- Crainhem/Kraainem metro station

General information
- Location: Avenue de Wezembeek / Wezembeeklaan; 1200 Woluwe-Saint-Lambert, Brussels-Capital Region, Belgium
- Coordinates: 50°50′56″N 4°27′31″E
- Owner: STIB/MIVB
- Platforms: 2
- Tracks: 2

Construction
- Structure type: Below grade
- Parking: Park and ride lot

History
- Opened: 31 August 1988; 38 years ago

Services
Preceding station	Brussels Metro	Following station
Alma towards Gare de l'Ouest/Weststation	Line 1	Stockel/Stokkel Terminus
Location

Crainhem (French, pronounced [kʁajnɛm]) or Kraainem (Dutch, pronounced [ˈkraːinɛm]) is a Brussels Metro station on the eastern branch of line 1. It is located in the municipality of Woluwe-Saint-Lambert, in the eastern part of Brussels, Belgium. It is located near the intersection of the Avenue de Wezembeek/Wezembeeklaan, the Avenue Mounier/Mounierlaan, and the Avenue de Kraainem/Kraainemlaan. It has a large park-and-ride lot and is also the terminus for a number of inbound regional bus routes of De Lijn, as well as for the STIB/MIVB bus routes 30 and 31.

The metro station opened on 31 August 1988 with the extension of the eastern branch of line 1B from Alma to Stockel/Stokkel. Due to its location in a park-and-ride lot, it is one of the few Brussels Metro stations that has its own station building on the surface (most other stations having only an underground mezzanine). Since 4 April 2009, the station has been served by the eastern branch of line 1 (previously line 1B).

== Naming ==
Originally, the station was just called Kraainem, using only Dutch spelling, as it was technically named after the Avenue de Kraainem/Kraainemlaan (a road using Dutch spelling for both its Dutch and French names), not after the nearby Flemish municipality of Kraainem. However, French speakers in the Brussels community quickly protested against what they regarded as a violation of bilingual language facilities and insisted that the French form Crainhem be added to the name of the station. Thus the station is today usually held to be named after the municipality of Kraainem, even though it is not actually located on its territory, but partly under the Brussels-Woluwe campus of the University of Louvain (UCLouvain).

== See also ==
- Transport in Brussels
- History of Brussels
