= Nos Pilifs Farm =

Belgian association

Nos Pilifs Farm is a farm and company that hires disabled people (nonprofit organization) founded in 1984 and located in Brussels.

== History ==
In 1971 Nelly Seiler Filipson (1926–2012), sensitized by her personal background, created a rehabilitation centre in Laeken for children with mental disabilities. She named it Nos Pilifs from an anagram of her name. This centre still receives some fifty disabled children up to the age of 13. Other organizations have been created to meet the needs of disabled persons who attended the centre. That is how the leisure club was established in 1980, "La Ferme Nos Pilifs" as a company that hires people with disabilities in 1984, the Maison Nos Pilifs providing accommodation and support service in 1985, "le Potelier des Pilifs" day centre in 1989, the "Ados Pilifs" secondary school for autistic children in 2011, the "Villa Pilifs" hostel in 2015, and soon "Les Piloux" inclusive children's nursery. All these private nonprofit organizations share the same philosophy: acceptance of difference and inclusion of people with disabilities.

== The centre ==
Nos Pilifs centre is a pre-primary and primary school with specialized education for children with autism or intellectual disability. The school is part of the non-confessional network. Nos Pilifs centre provides multidisciplinary care in speech therapy, psychomotor education, occupational therapy, physiotherapy and behavioural psychology.

== Ferme Nos Pilifs ASBL ==
The farm was created in 1984, on the initiative of Mrs Filipson and Benoit Ceysens in response to a lack of employment for disabled people in the north of Brussels. The farm is now a recognized company with disabled employees certified by the Cocof. For social and ecological purposes, 140 out of its 180 employees are disabled. It works a 12-acre long field in Neder-Over-Heembeek in the north of Brussels, with an animal park, a garden centre, different plots, a grocery shop, a brewery and a conditioning workshop for organic dry food. Eight teams of gardeners also offer various gardening services. Children can spend their school breaks at the farm, and school groups can visit it on field trips at any time of the year. Through those various activities, Nos Pilifs Farm showcases disabled people's skills and gives them a real role in their neighbourhood.

== Accessibility ==
Bus line 53, stop Nos Pilifs.
Bus line 56, (new route since 2 March 2020), stop Ferme Nos Pilifs.

== Bibliography ==
- G. C., Nelly Filipson s’en est allée, La Libre Belgique, 7 June 2012, p. 13 (online). (in French)
- Nos Pilifs a perdu sa maman, Centre communautaire laïc juif, online. History of the project and biography of the founder. (in French)
- Du passif à la ferme Nos Pilifs, Télé Bruxelles, 16 May 2011.
- Ferme Nos Pilifs : bâtiment exemplaire (l'atelier de manutention), Bruxelles Ville durable (online). (in French)
- La ferme Nos Pilifs récompensée, Tribune de Bruxelles, 21 June 2011, n° 409, p. 2.
- Charity evening organized by the bookshop Filigranes for the benefit of Nos Pilifs (online). (in French)
- Alexandre Alajbegovic, Noël social à la ferme Nos Pilifs, La Libre Belgique, 1 December 2007 (online). (in French)
- Christophe Dubois, Le durable mis au goût du (huitième) jour, Symbioses, Summer 2002, n° 55, p. 15. (in French)
