= Brussels-West station =

Metro station in Brussels, Belgium

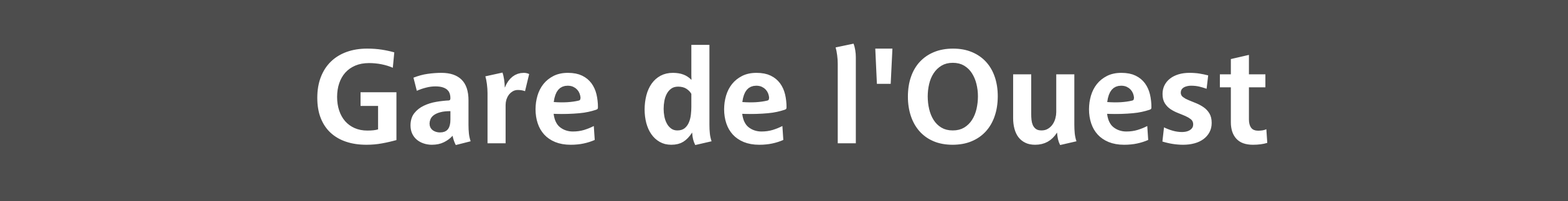
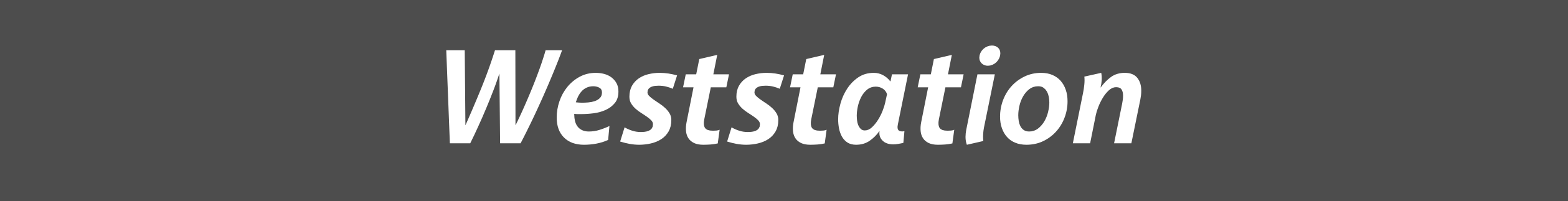

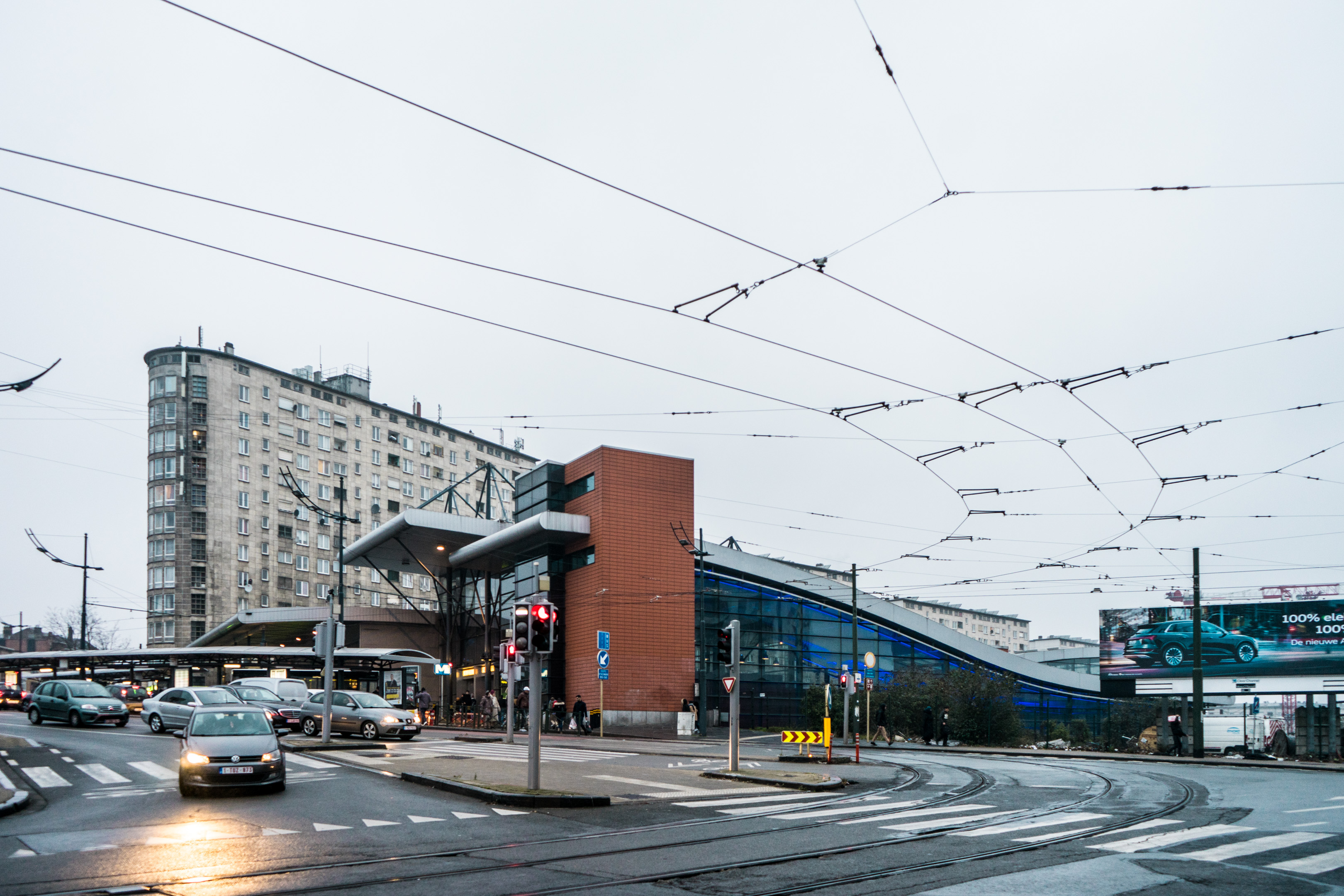
- Gare de l'Ouest/Weststation metro station

General information
- Location: Chaussée de Ninove / Ninoofse Steenweg; 1080 Molenbeek-Saint-Jean, Brussels-Capital Region; Belgium
- Coordinates: 50°50′56″N 4°19′15″E
- Owner: STIB/MIVB

Construction
- Accessible: Yes

History
- Opened: 6 October 1982; 43 years ago

Services
Preceding station	Brussels Metro	Following station
Terminus	Line 1	Beekkant towards Stockel/Stokkel
Delacroix towards Elisabeth	Line 2	Beekkant towards Simonis
Jacques Brel towards Erasme/Erasmus	Line 5	Beekkant towards Herrmann-Debroux
Delacroix towards Elisabeth	Line 6	Beekkant towards King Baudouin
Location

Brussels-West

General information
- Coordinates: 50°50′56″N 4°19′15″E
- System: Railway Station
- Owner: SNCB/NMBS
- Operator: SNCB/NMBS
- Line: 28
- Platforms: 2

Other information
- Station code: FBOW

History
- Opened: 1872; 154 years ago
- Closed: 1984; 42 years ago
- Rebuilt: 2009; 17 years ago

Services
Preceding station	NMBS/SNCB	Following station
Simonis towards Dendermonde	S 10	Bruxelles-Midi / Brussel-Zuid towards Aalst
Location

Brussels-West Station (French: Gare de l'Ouest; Dutch: Weststation) is a multimodal transport hub located in the municipality of Molenbeek-Saint-Jean, in the western part of Brussels, Belgium. It mainly consists of Gare de l'Ouest (French) or Weststation (Dutch), a Brussels Metro station on lines 1, 2, 5 and 6, as well as a tram and bus stop. Additionally, Brussels-West railway station (French: Gare de Bruxelles-Ouest; Dutch: Station Brussel-West) (Note: Officially Brussels-West (French: Bruxelles-Ouest; Dutch: Brussel-West)) is a railway station operated by the National Railway Company of Belgium (SNCB/NMBS). It is served by the Brussels Regional Express Network (RER/GEN) service.

The original railway station was opened in 1872 by the Belgian State Railways; it was closed for passengers in 1984. The metro station opened on 6 October 1982 as part of the Beekkant–Saint-Guidon/Sint-Guido extension of former line 1B. Then, following the reorganisation of the Brussels Metro on 4 April 2009, it is served by lines 1, 2, 5 and 6. The railway station also reopened on that occasion.

Nowadays, the station is mainly used by commuters as there are few tourist sites nearby, although as an important junction between lines, many users of the metro network change trains there.

== History ==
A train only station was initially put into service on 25 December 1872 on the western orbital railroad of Brussels, line 28. It used to be an extensive goods yard, with the station building located close to the current location of Beekkant metro station. In 1883, Delhaize Group moved to Molenbeek where it had a special platform at the station capable of handling 550 freight wagons per week. After the closure of the goods yard, the platforms were moved south. The train station was closed to passenger traffic on 3 June 1984, but reopened in December 2009 in the framework of the Brussels Regional Express Network (RER/GEN) project.

The metro station began service from 6 October 1982, served by former line 1B of the Brussels Metro. With the completion of the "loop" of line 2 and the reorganisation of the Brussels metro network in April 2009, all Brussels metro lines (1, 2, 5 and 6) now serve the station. The station also connects with tram and bus lines, and the new Jacques Brel bus and metro depot has been built nearby.

== Current services ==
Since its rebuilding in 2009, Brussels-West has become a major multimodal transport hub in the western part of the city, in line with the Brussels RER/GEN development.

=== National Rail (SNCB/NMBS) ===
The station is served by the following service(s):

- Brussels RER/GEN services (S10) Dendermonde - Brussels - Denderleeuw - Aalst

=== Brussels Metro (STIB/MIVB) ===
On the metro network, the station is called Gare de l'Ouest in French and Weststation in Dutch. It is served by all metro lines (1-5 and 2-6). Changing between the two metro lines (1/5 and 2/6), is however, very cumbersome, requiring passengers to go up the escalator, leave the fare controlled area and cross the main railway line and down through a fare gate again. That change is better done at the next station, Beekkant.

=== Brussels tram lines (STIB/MIVB) ===
- Line 82 Berchem Station - Drogenbos Castle
- Line 83 Berchem Station - Montgomery

=== Brussels bus lines (STIB/MIVB) ===
- Line 86 Machtens - Central Station

=== Flemish bus lines (De Lijn) ===
- 126 North Station - Ninove (Express)
- 127 North Station - Ninove
- 128 North station - Ninove
- 129 North Station - Dilbeek Zuurweide
- 620 Brussels Airport - Erasmus Hospital
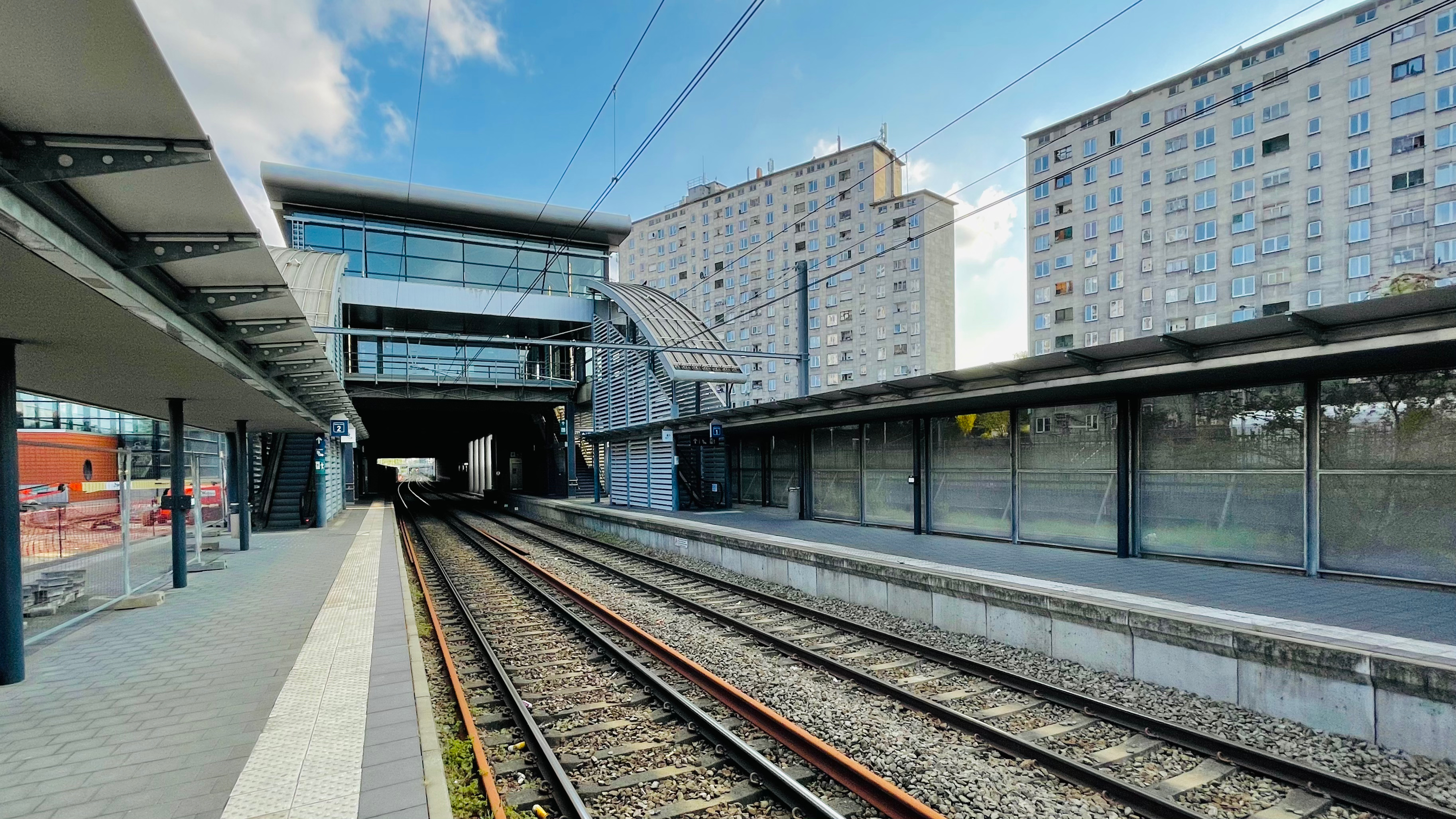
View of the West Station's platforms and tracks

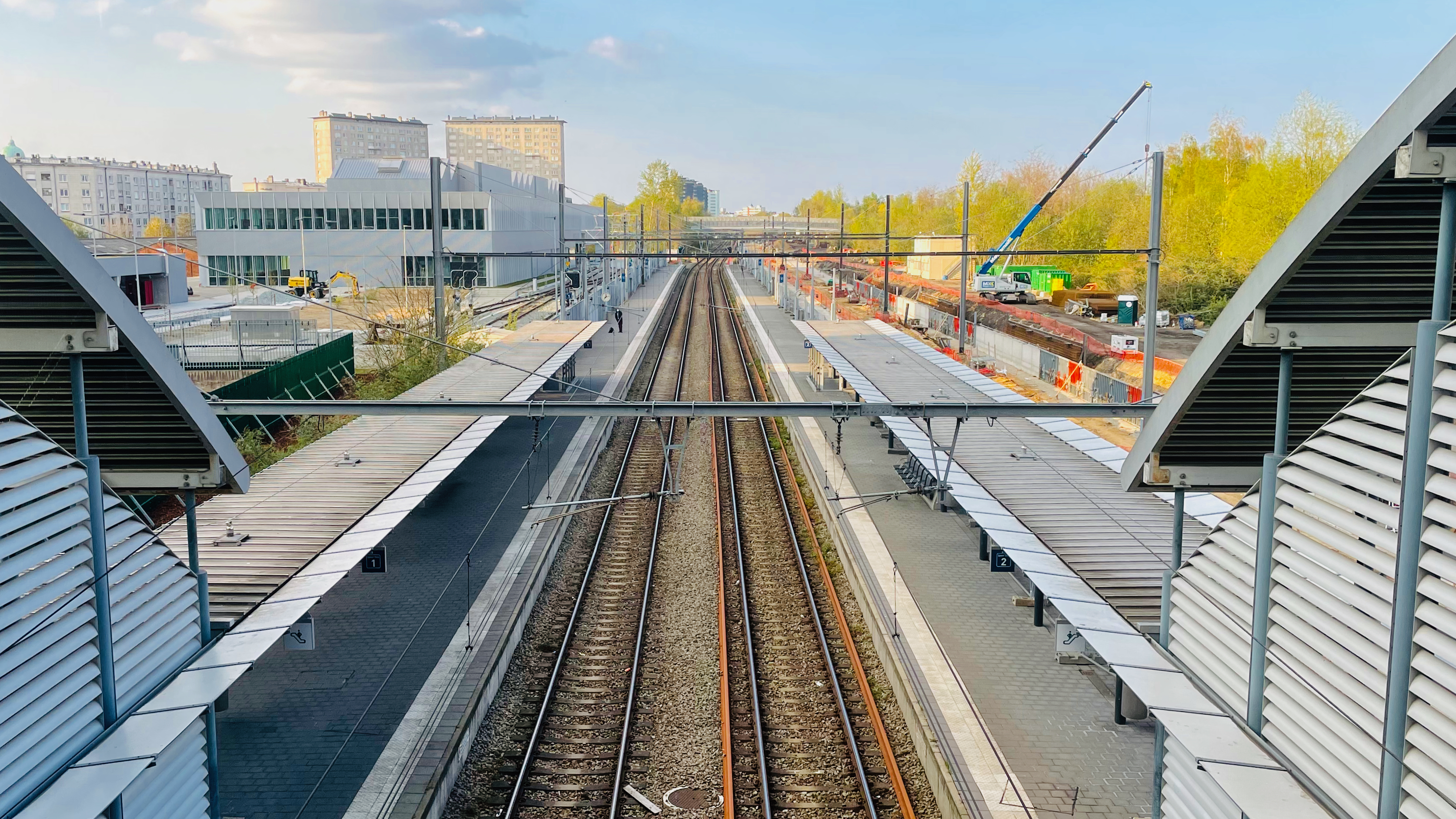
Looking down at the platforms and tracks

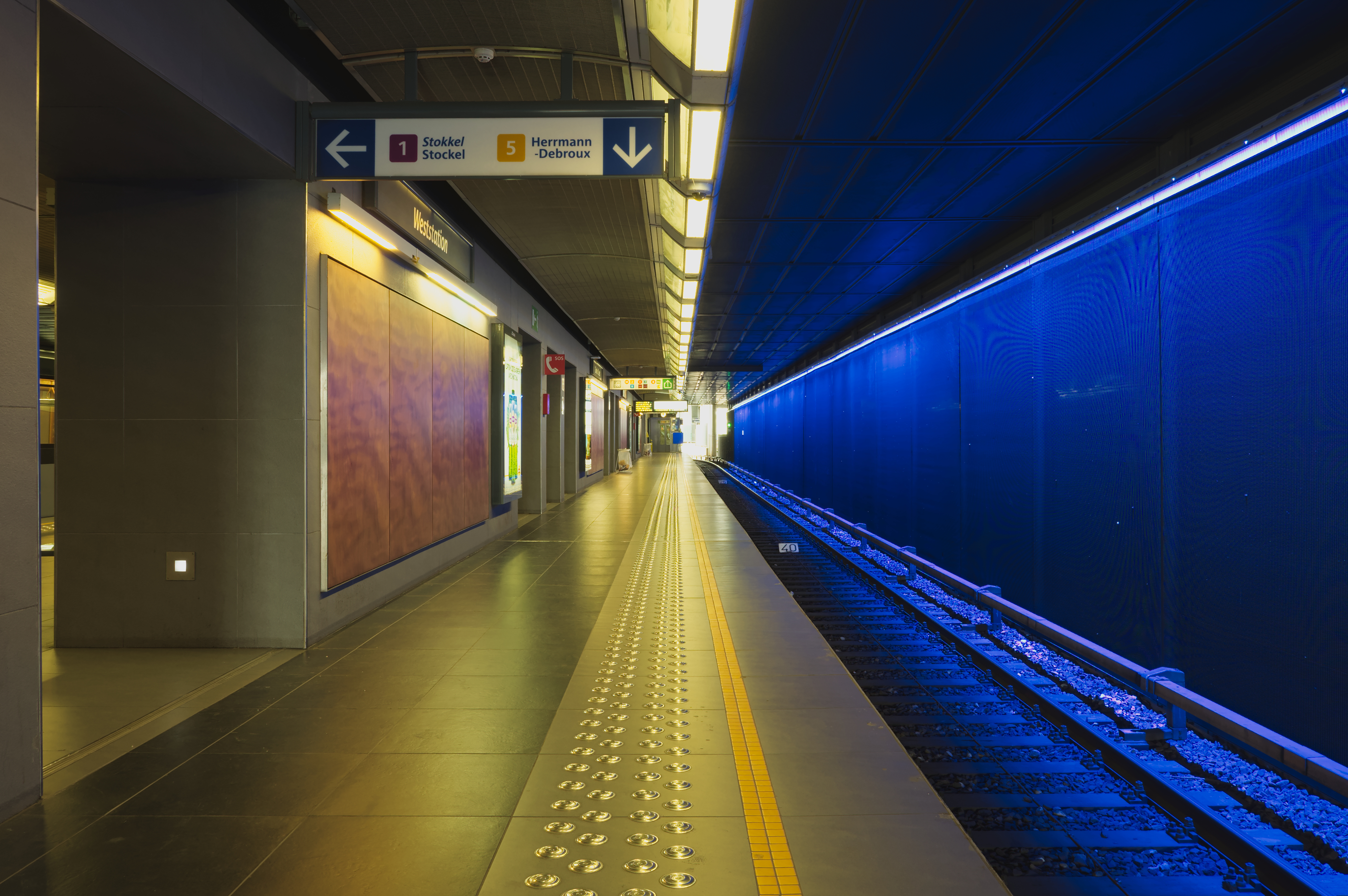
Gare de l'Ouest/Weststation metro station

== See also ==
- List of railway stations in Belgium
- Rail transport in Belgium
- Transport in Brussels
- History of Brussels
