= Buses in Brussels =

Bus network in Brussels, Belgium

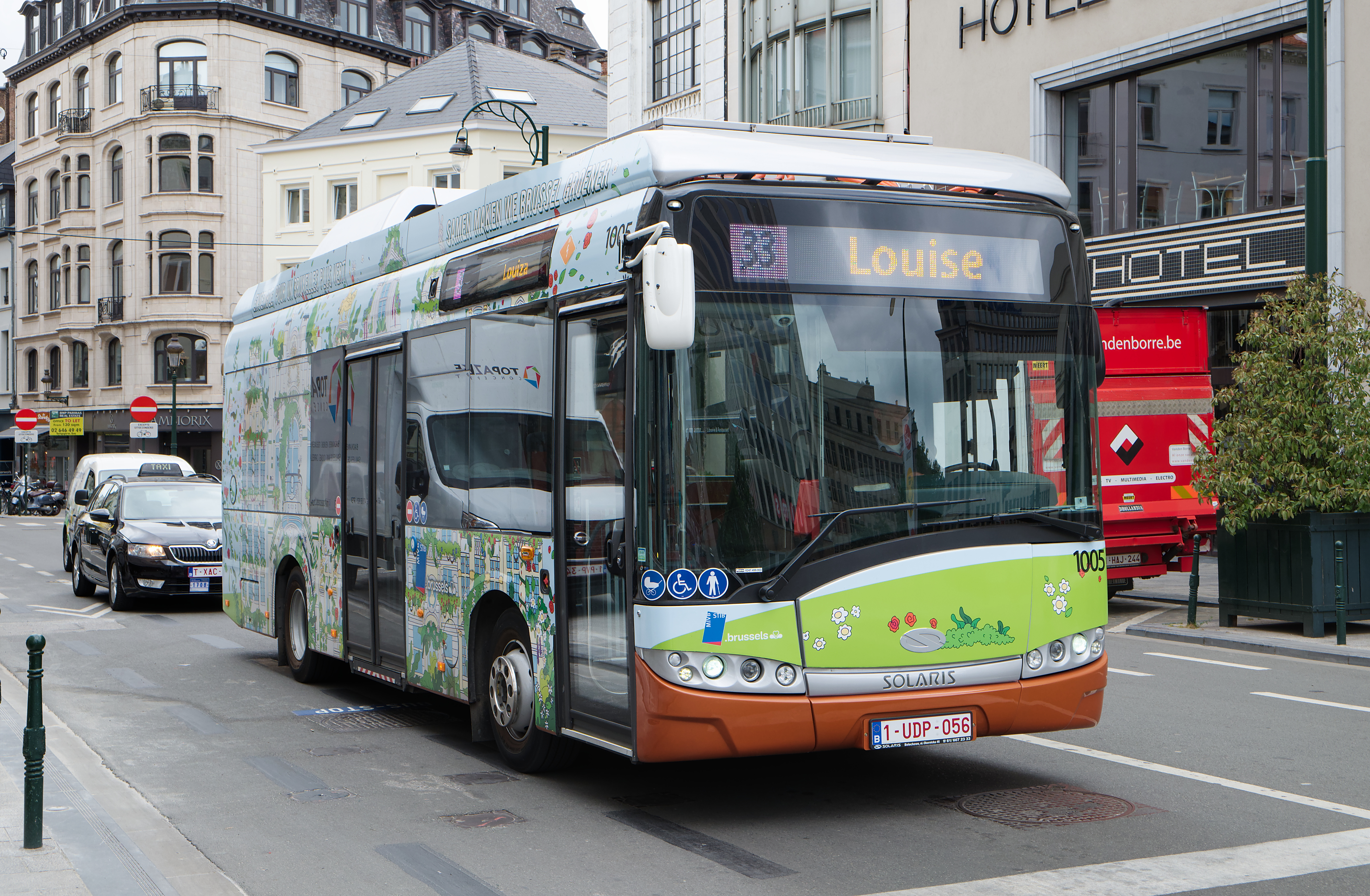
Solaris electric bus operated by STIB/MIVB on line 33

The Brussels buses network is complementary to the rail network in Brussels, Belgium, which consists of trams, trains, and metro trains. Brussels buses are operated by STIB/MIVB, the local public transport company. It has 50 bus routes and 11 night routes, which run on Friday and Saturday night.

Some buses from Flemish transport company De Lijn and Walloon transport company TEC also serve Brussels but are not part of the same bus system.

== History ==
The first motor buses were used in Brussels in 1907, with one route connecting the Bourse Palace to Ixelles' Municipal Hall. It was then stopped in 1913. Other buses were set in service from 1920 on, and in 1926, Les Autobus Bruxellois, a bus company, was founded to operate the bus network. In 1955, one year after the Brussels Intercommunal Transport Company (STIB/MIVB) was founded, it took over Les Autobus Bruxellois and operated the bus network, made of 3 bus routes and 1 trolleybus route. STIB/MIVB expanded the network, and in 1964, it was 185 km (115 mi) long. The bus fleet was renewed in 1972 and in 1991, with a new yellow livery. In 2003, STIB/MIVB tested its first night bus route named N71

In 2008, STIB/MIVB launched the Airport Line (bus 12), providing a direct and frequent connection between Brussels Airport and the city centre or European Quarter. Tickets for travel from the airport require the specific "Airport2City" fare (€7–7.90 via contactless or MOBIB), which includes free transfers across the Brussels Metro, tram and bus networks within the hour. Travellers may use scheduled coach services offering frequent shuttle routes between Brussels South Charleroi Airport and Brussels-South railway station.

== Routes ==
=== Current routes ===
Valid as of 8 March 2022.

Route Number	From	To	Journey Time	Frequency	Hours of Operation	Note
Bus 12	Brussels Airport	Brussels City (Troon / Trône)	37min.	10'-12'	04:59-00:38	Airport Line, stops only at Troon / Trône, Luxembourg / Luxemburg, Schuman, Meiser, Genève, Da Vinci, Bourget and Brussels Airport. Special fares between Brussels Airport and Bourget in the direction of Troon/Trône.
Bus 13	UZ-VUB	Étangs Noirs / Zwarte Vijvers	31min.	10'-12'	05:25-00:41	
Bus 14	Heysel / Heizel	Gare du Nord / Noordstation	39min.	10'-12'	05:15-23:59	
Bus 17	Beaulieu	Heiligenborre	18min.	12'-15'	05:05-00:49	Diverted between the stops Drie Linden/Les Trois Tilleuls and Wiener due to the market of the Wienerplace every Sunday until 15:00.
Bus 20	Hunderenveld	Gare du Nord / Noordstation	39min.	10'-12'	05:07-00:09	
Bus 21	Maes	Luxembourg / Luxemburg	40min.	12'-15'	05:28-23:44	
Bus 27	Luxembourg / Luxemburg	Plejades / Plejaden	28min.	10'-15'	05:00-23:43	Shortened to Brussels-Luxembourg on 1 September 2021, used to go to Gare du Midi / Zuidstation
Bus 28	Brabançonne	Konkel	25min.	10'-12'	05:48-00:05	
Bus 29	De Brouckère	Hof ten Berg	47min.	6'-10'	05:35-00:26	During peak hours one in two buses terminate at Madou instead of De Brouckère.
Bus 33	Louise / Louiza	Dansaert	13min.	20'	07:29-23:32	
Bus 34	Porte de Namur / Naamsepoort	Sainte-Anne / Sint-Anna	35min.	6'-8'	05:48-00:05	One in two buses diverted to Rond Point du Souverain / Vorstrondpunt from Auderghem Shopping / Oudergem Shopping before 20:00. After 20:00, all buses divert this way.
Bus 36	Schuman	Konkel	45min.	10'-12'	06:00-00:15	
Bus 37	Albert	Linkebeek railway station	30min.	12'-15'	05:51-00:18	
Bus 38	Gare Centrale / Centraal Station	Héros / Helden	41min.	6'-10'	05:47-00:22	
Bus 41	Transvaal	Héros / Helden	37min.	10'-12'	05:44-00:04	Diverted between Montana and Brésil / Brazilië on Saturday, Sunday and public holidays due to the closure of the Bois de la Cambre / Ter Kamerenbos.
Bus 42	Viaduc E40 / Viaduct E40	Roodebeek	14min.	12'-15'	05:58-00:15	
Bus 43	Observatoire / Sterrenwacht	Station Diesdelle / Gare Vivier d'Oie	41min.	12'-15'	05:47-23:40	After 20:30 buses only run between Helden / Héros and Station Diesdelle / Gare Vivier d'Oie
Bus 45	Roodebeek	Saint-Vincent / Sint-Vincentius	24min.	6'-10'	05:50-00:15	From Monday to Friday during peak hours, one in two buses only run between Roodebeek and Permeke.
Bus 46	Pannenhuis	Moortebeek	47min.	6'-10'	05:01-00:18	Extended to Pannenhuis on 23 September 2024, before that buses terminated at WTC-Gilbert.
Bus 47	Vilvoorde Station	Heembeek	27min.	6'-8'	05:06-00:40	From Monday to Saturday one in two buses only run between Heembeek and Hôpital Militaire / Militair Hospitaal.
Bus 48	Anneessens	Decroly	40min.	5'-10'	05:18-00:11	From Monday to Friday, one in two buses only run between Decroly and Porte de Hal / Hallepoort.
Bus 49	Simonis	Gare du Midi / Zuidstation	36min.	6'-10'	05:39-00:20	
Bus 50	Gare du Midi / Zuidstation	Lot Station	31min.	10'-15'	05:00-00:18	
Bus 52	Forest National / Vorst Nationaal	Gare Centrale / Centraal Station	30min.	12'-15'	05:43-00:03	New line introduced on 1 September 2021 to offer Forest / Vorst a direct link with the city center, which was previously only possible with tram 32 which only ran after 20:00.
Bus 53	Hôpital Miltaire / Militair Hospitaal	Westland Shopping	55min.	8'-10'	05:08-00:14	
Bus 54	Forest Centre (Bervoets) / Vorst Centrum (Bervoets)	Trône / Troon	35min.	6'-12'	05:35-00:15	
Bus 56	Schuman	Buda	46min.	12'-15'	04:28-00:05	Opened 2 March 2020. Terminates at the PostX post sorting facility and not at Buda railway station, which is located 20min. away by foot.
Bus 57	Hôpital Militaire / Militair Hospitaal	Gare du Nord / Noordstation	27min.	8'-20'	05:42-20:17	Only runs Monday to Friday.
Bus 58	Vilvoorde Station	Yser / IJzer	39min.	10'-15'	05:29-22:22	Does not run after 22:00.
Bus 59	Hôpital Etterbeek-Ixelles / Ziekenhuis Etterbeek-Elsene	Bordet Station	49min.	8'-10'	04:40-00:08	
Bus 60	Ambiorix	Ukkel-Calevoet / Ukkel-Kalevoet	52min.	10'-12'	05:36-00:17	
Bus 61	Gare du Nord / Noordstation	Montgomery	33min.	10'-15'	05:56-23:55	
Bus 63	Cimetière de Bruxelles / Begraafplaats van Brussel	Gare Centrale / Centraal Station	35min.	6'-10'	05:15-00:23	
Bus 64	Bordet Station	Porte de Namur / Naamsepoort	38min.	6'-10'	05:06-00:10	
Bus 65	Machelen	De Brouckère	65min.	8'-10'	04:56-00:17	Since 1 July 2020 this line has been temporary limited to Gare Centrale / Centraal Station.
Bus 66	Péage / Tol	De Brouckère	48min.	8'-10'	05:02-00:10	Since 1 July 2020 this line has been temporary limited to Gare Centrale / Centraal Station.
Bus 69	Schaerbeek Gare / Schaarbeek Station	Jules Bordet	12min.	6'	06:46-08:52 14:59-17:51	Only runs Monday to Friday during rush hour.
Bus 70	Albert	Homborch	33min.	12'-15'	05:51-20:13	Runs as compensation for tram 51 which doesn't run between Albert and Globe due to construction works. Does not run after 20:00 and on Saturday buses only run between Albert en Héros / Helden. No service on Sunday and public holidays.
Bus 71	De Brouckère	Delta	40min.	5'-6'	04:55-00:37 04:55-03:07	
Bus 72	ULB	ADEPS	20min.	60'	07:32-21:37	
Bus 73	CERIA / COOVI	Gare du Midi / Zuidstation	20min.	20'	05:44-00:14	In service from 7 March 2022.
Bus 74	Clémence Everard	Uccle-Stalle / Ukkel-Stalle	35min.	12'-15'	05:50-00:00	
Bus 75	Bon Air / Goede Lucht	Héros / Helden	41min.	12'-15'	05:31-23:28	
Bus 76	Kraainem	Oppem	13min.	12'-15'	05:56-21:00	Does not run after 21:00, or on Sundays and public holidays.
Bus 77	Kraainem	Hippodrome / Hippodroom	10min.	12'	07:03-08:37 14:03-18:04	Only runs Monday to Friday during rush hour.
Bus 78	Gare du Midi / Zuidstation	Humanité / Humaniteit	14min.	20'	05:28-20:15	Does not run after 20:00, or on Sundays and public holidays.
Bus 79	Kraainem	Schuman	24min.	12'-15'	05:39-00:26	
Bus 80	Porte de Namur / Naamsepoort	Haren	52min.	10'-12'	05:44-00:08	
Bus 83	Val Maria / Mariëndaal	Berchem Station	52min.	10'-12'	05:20-00:21	Extended to Val Maria / Mariëndaal on 1 September 2021, before that buses terminated at Heysel/Heizel metro station.
Bus 86	Bockstael	Machtens	37min.	10'-12'	05:15-00:02	Used to be Gare Centrale / Centraal Station - Machtens until 1 September 2021.
Bus 87	Beekkant	Simonis	48min.	6'-8'	05:20-23:57	
Bus 88	UZ-VUB	De Brouckère	44min.	10'-12'	05:30-00:31	
Bus 89	Gare Centrale / Centraal Station	Westland Shopping	38min.	10'-12'	05:07-00:10	Used to be Bockstael - Westland Shopping until 1 September 2021.
Bus 95	Grand-Place / Grote Markt	Wiener	45min.	5'-6'	05:30-00:16	Diverted between the stops Drie Linden/Les Trois Tilleuls and Wiener due to the market of the Wienerplace every Sunday until 15:00.
Bus N04	Gare Centrale / Centraal Station	Cimetière de Bruxelles / Begraafplaats van Brussel	34min.	30'	00:51-02:52	NOCTIS, only operated on Friday and Saturday evenings.
Bus N05	Gare Centrale / Centraal Station	Kraainem	41min.	30'	00:26-03:02	NOCTIS, only operated on Friday and Saturday evenings.
Bus N06	Gare Centrale / Centraal Station	Musée du Tram / Trammuseum	37min.	30'	01:01-03:01	NOCTIS, only operated on Friday and Saturday evenings.
Bus N08	Gare Centrale / Centraal Station	Wiener	37min.	20'	00:40-03:00	NOCTIS, only operated on Friday and Saturday evenings.
Bus N09	Gare Centrale / Centraal Station	Herrmann-Debroux	45min.	20'	00:31-02:50	NOCTIS, only operated on Friday and Saturday evenings.
Bus N10	Gare Centrale / Centraal Station	Fort-Jaco	42min.	30'	00:26-02:56	NOCTIS, only operated on Friday and Saturday evenings.
Bus N11	Gare Centrale / Centraal Station	Homborch	46min.	30'	00:24-02:55	NOCTIS, only operated on Friday and Saturday evenings.
Bus N12	Gare Centrale / Centraal Station	Stalle (P)	33min.	30'	00:35-03:05	NOCTIS, only operated on Friday and Saturday evenings.
Bus N13	Gare Centrale / Centraal Station	Westland-Shopping	24min.	30'	00:38-03:08	NOCTIS, only operated on Friday and Saturday evenings.
Bus N16	Gare Centrale / Centraal Station	Berchem Station	33min.	30'	00:30-03:00	NOCTIS, only operated on Friday and Saturday evenings.
Bus N18	Gare Centrale / Centraal Station	Heysel / Heizel	25min.	30'	00:36-03:06	NOCTIS, only operated on Friday and Saturday evenings.
