= Simonis and Elisabeth stations =

Metro station in Brussels, Belgium

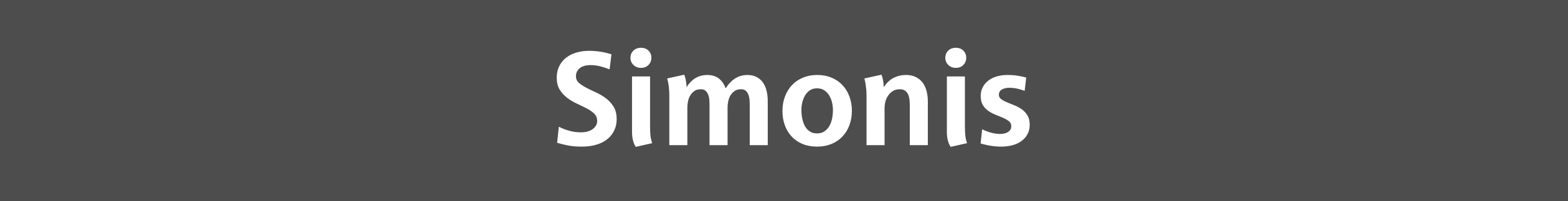
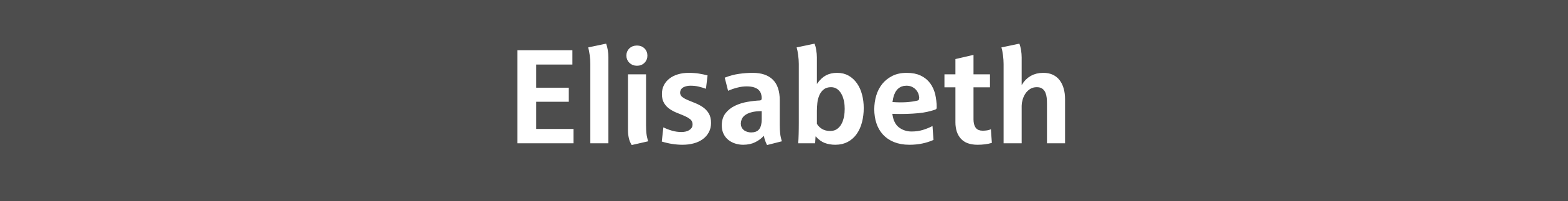
—

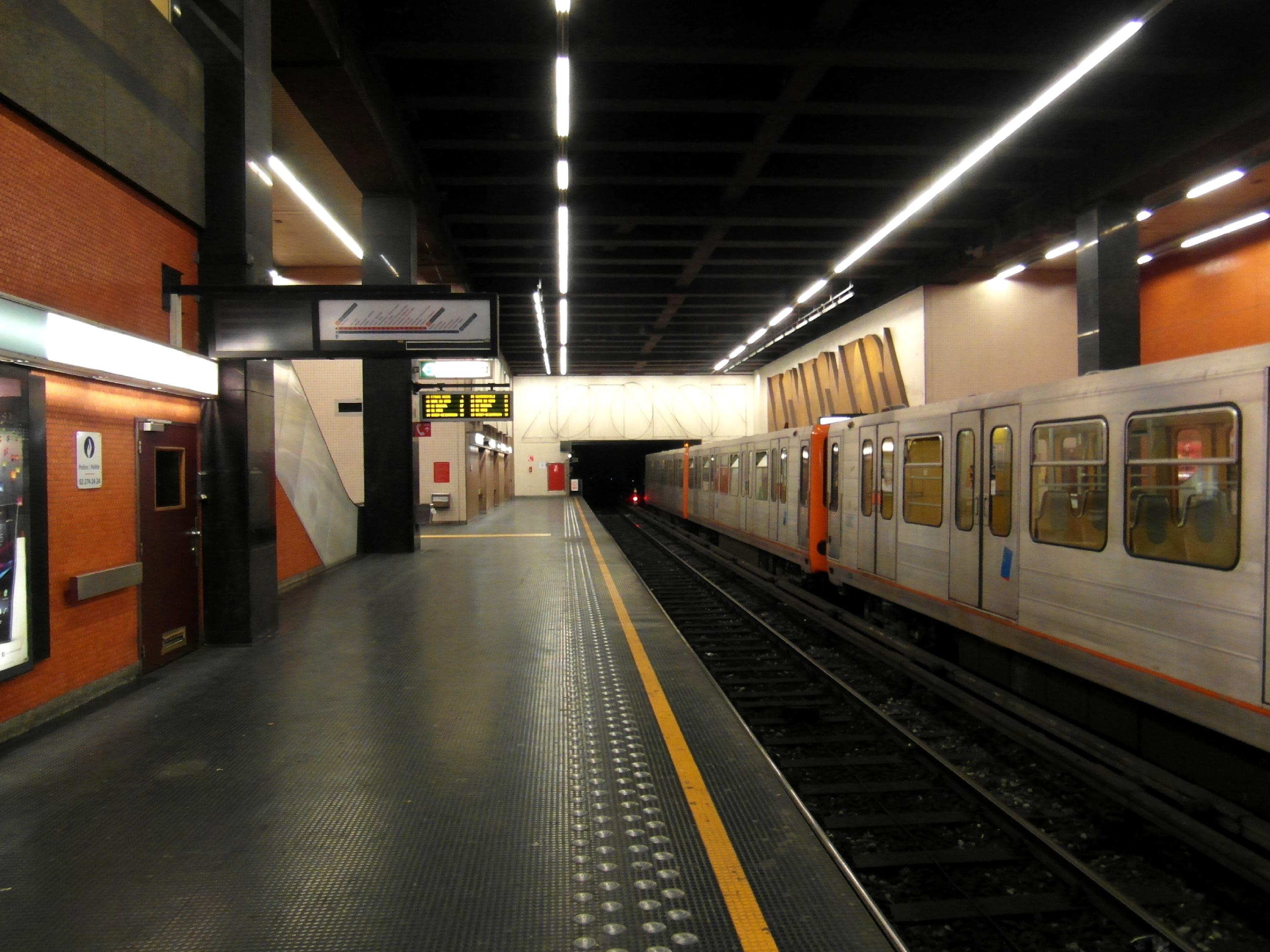

General information
- Location: Boulevard Léopold II / Leopold II-laan; 1081 Koekelberg, Brussels-Capital Region, Belgium
- Coordinates: 50°51′47″N 4°19′50″E
- Owner: STIB/MIVB, Infrabel
- Operator: STIB/MIVB, SNCB/NMBS
- Platforms: 1 island platform (Simonis metro); 2 side platforms (Elisabeth metro); 2 side platforms (SNCB/NMBS); 2 side platforms (tram 19); 1 side, 1 island platform (tram 9)
- Tracks: 11

Construction
- Structure type: Underground
- Platform levels: 2

History
- Opened: 1982; 44 years ago (Simonis metro); 1986; 40 years ago (tram 19); 1988; 38 years ago (Elisabeth metro); 2009; 17 years ago (railway); 2019; 7 years ago (tram 9)

Services
| Preceding station | NMBS/SNCB | Following station |
|---|---|---|
| Thurn en Taxis towards Dendermonde | S 10 | Brussels-West towards Aalst |
| Preceding station | Brussels Metro | Following station |
Simonis
| Osseghem/Ossegem towards Elisabeth | Line 2 | Terminus |
| Osseghem/Ossegem towards Elisabeth | Line 6 | Belgica towards King Baudouin |
Elisabeth
| Terminus | Line 2 | Ribaucourt towards Simonis |
| Terminus | Line 6 | Ribaucourt towards King Baudouin |
Location

Simonis and Elisabeth are two interconnected Brussels Metro stations serving lines 2 and 6 on two different levels, as well as a tram and bus stop. Additionally, Simonis railway station (French: Gare de Simonis; Dutch: Station Simonis) (Note: Officially Simonis) is a railway station operated by the National Railway Company of Belgium (SNCB/NMBS). It is served by the Brussels Regional Express Network (RER/GEN) service.

The station complex is situated at the end of the Boulevard Léopold II/Leopold II-laan in the municipality of Koekelberg, in the western part of Brussels, Belgium. Simonis received its name from the aboveground square Place Eugène Simonis/Eugène Simonisplein, itself named after the sculptor Eugène Simonis; while the nearby Elisabeth Park, named after Queen Elisabeth, gives Elisabeth its name.

Simonis metro station opened on 6 October 1982 and is a transit station in north–south direction situated in a cutting next to a railway line. It serves as a transit station on line 6 and a terminus of line 2. Elisabeth metro station is orthogonal to and one level below Simonis and is a terminal station located at the end of the Boulevard Léopold II in east–west direction. It opened on 2 October 1988 and is the terminus for lines 2 and 6.

== Naming ==
Between its opening in 1988 and 2013, Elisabeth was also known as Simonis. Until 2009, Simonis was a simple interchange station between former metro lines 1A and 2. When the Brussels Metro "loop" opened in 2009, the north-western part of metro line 1A was connected to the other end of metro line 2, making line 2 an imperfect circle line (since a true circular train service is not possible, as the tracks at Simonis/Elisabeth are not connected). This resulted in the current situation, whereby the station complex is served twice by lines 2 and 6.

To differentiate between the two station parts, the north–south through platforms were given the name Simonis (Leopold II), while the east–west terminating platforms were known as Simonis (Elisabeth). However, this did not improve the clarity of passenger information and thus, on 3 November 2013, Simonis (Leopold II) was reverted to simply Simonis, while Simonis (Elisabeth) became Elisabeth. The adjacent bus, tram and railway stops have not been renamed, and are all still known as Simonis.

== Current services ==
=== National Rail (SNCB/NMBS) ===
Directly to the east of and parallel to Simonis metro station, the National Railway Company of Belgium (NMBS/SNCB) has operated the local commuter station Simonis since December 2009.

The station is served by the following service(s):

- Brussels RER services (S10) Dendermonde - Brussels - Denderleeuw - Aalst

=== Brussels Metro (STIB/MIVB) ===
On the metro network, the station is called Simonis and Elisabeth. It is served by metro lines 2 and 6.

=== Brussels tram lines (STIB/MIVB) ===
- Brussels trams 9 and 19 call at underground platforms (premetro) opened on 23 June 1986 (line 19) and 1 September 2018 (line 9), respectively, directly connected to the west of the station.

=== Brussels bus lines (STIB/MIVB) ===
- Line 13 Étangs Noirs - UZ-VUB
- Line 49 Simonis - South Station
- Line 87 Simonis - Beekkant

=== Flemish bus lines (De Lijn) ===
- R14 North Station - Aalst
- R15 North Station - Denderleeuw
- 213 Simonis - Aast
- 714 North Station - Aalst
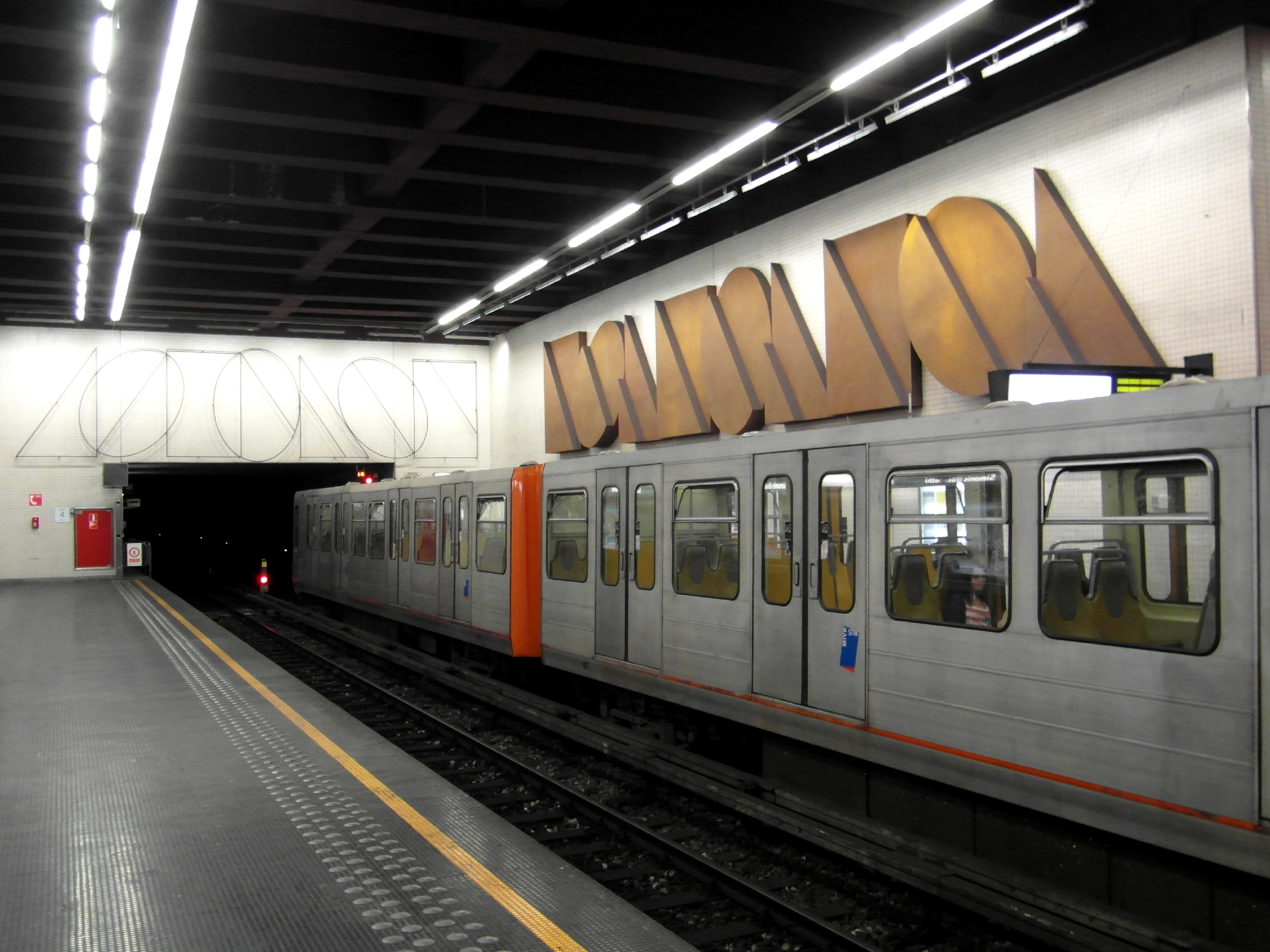
Platform of Elisabeth metro station

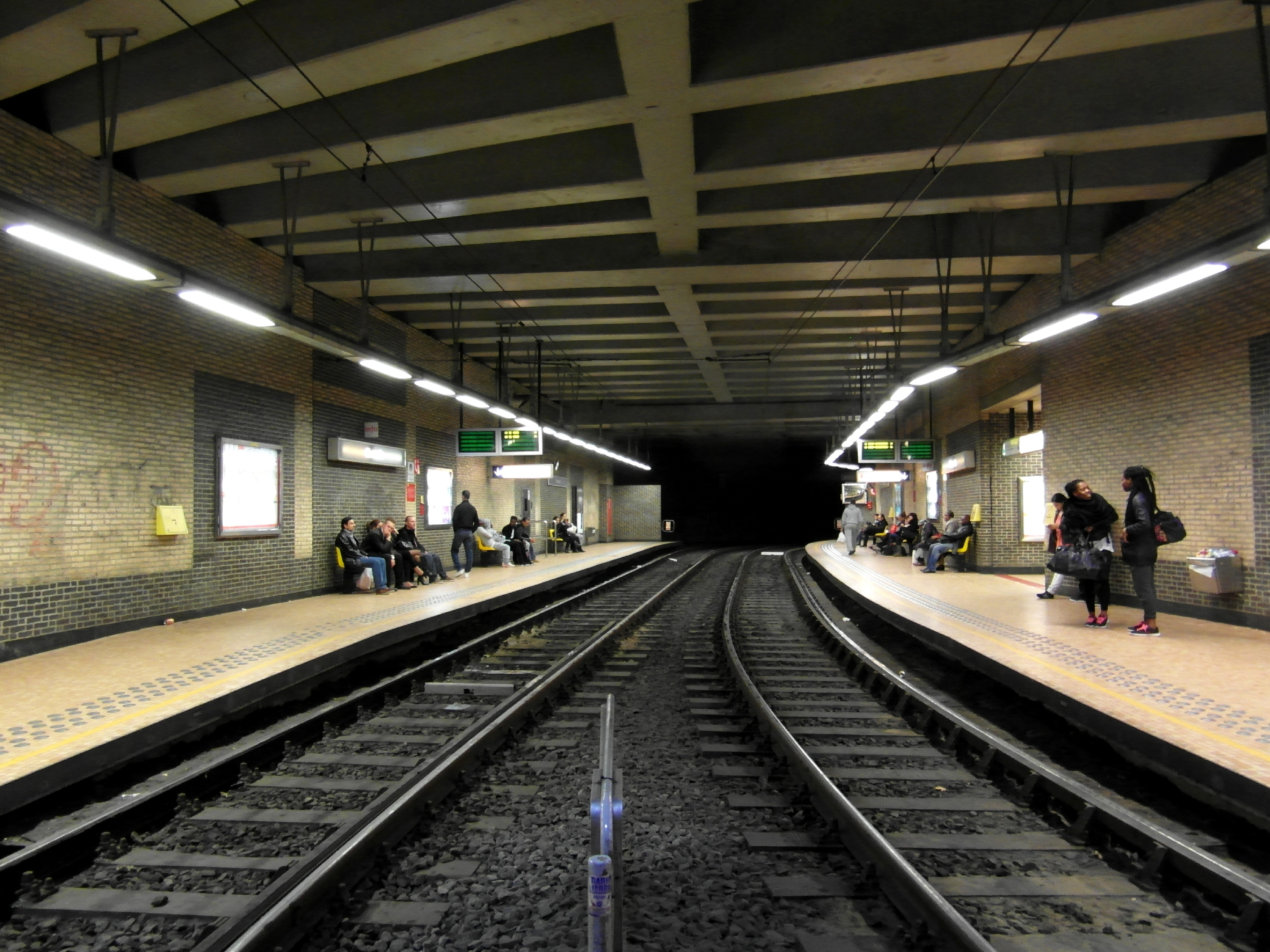
Pre-renovation Tram 19 platforms looking south-west

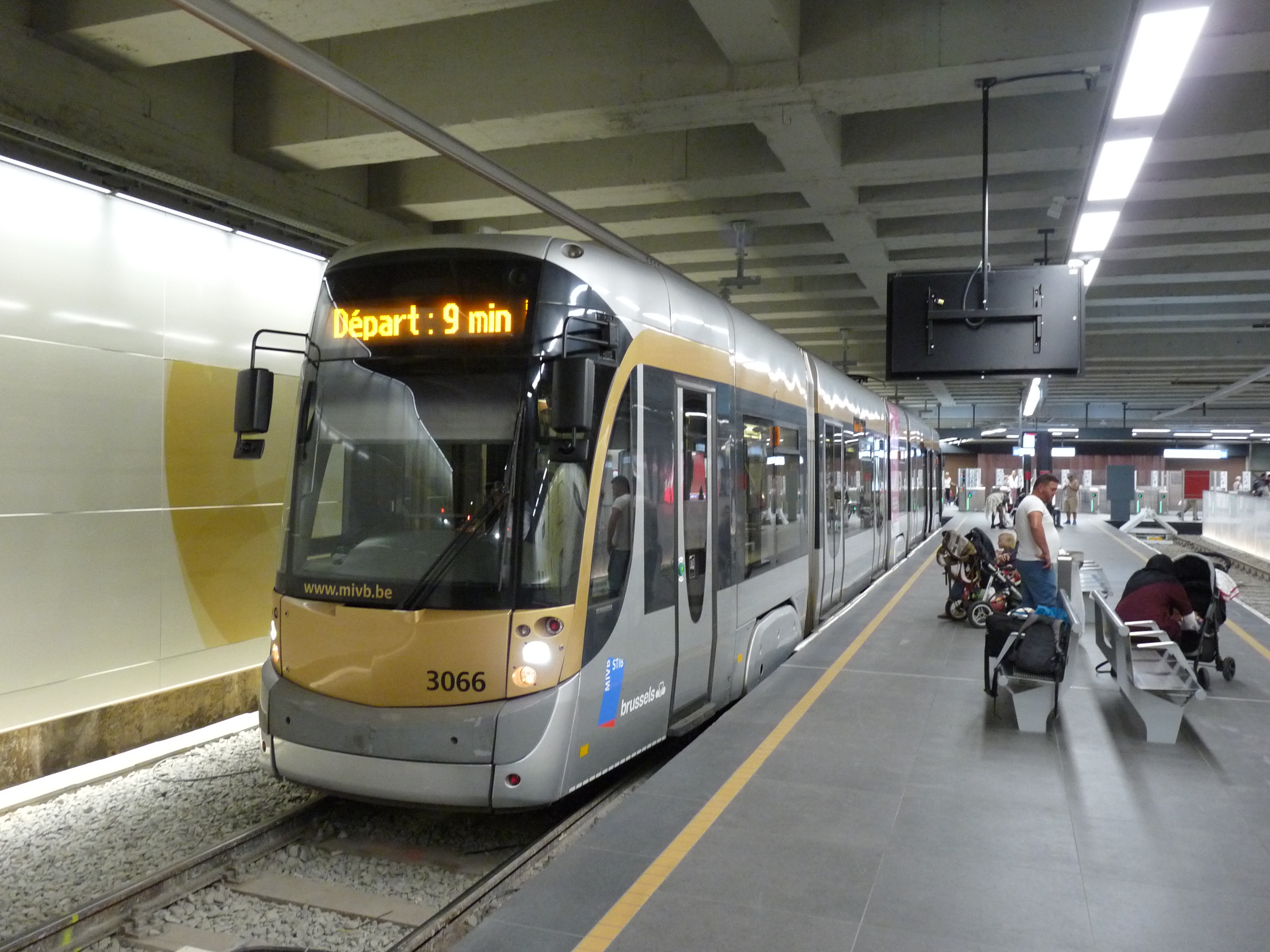
Tram 9 platforms looking south-east, completed in 2018

== See also ==
- List of railway stations in Belgium
- Rail transport in Belgium
- Transport in Brussels
- History of Brussels
