= King Baudouin metro station =

Metro station in Brussels, Belgium

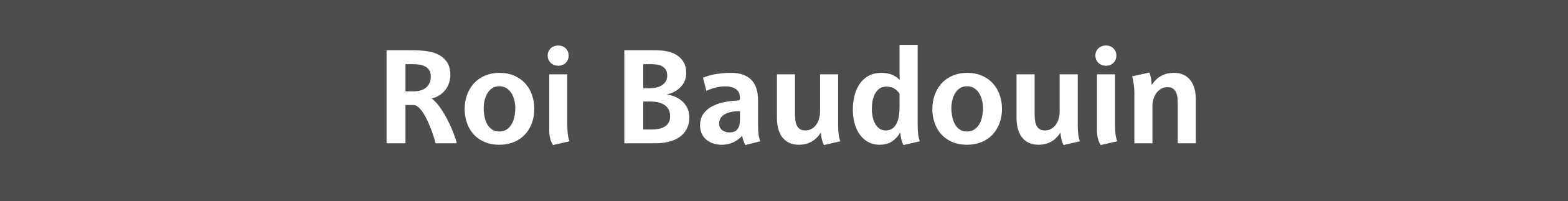
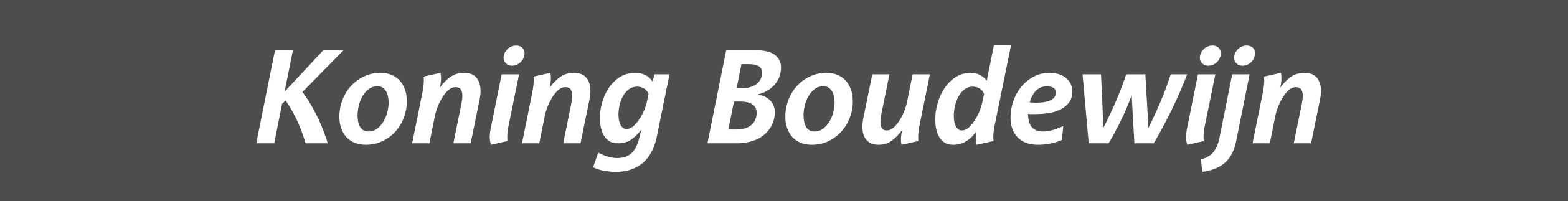

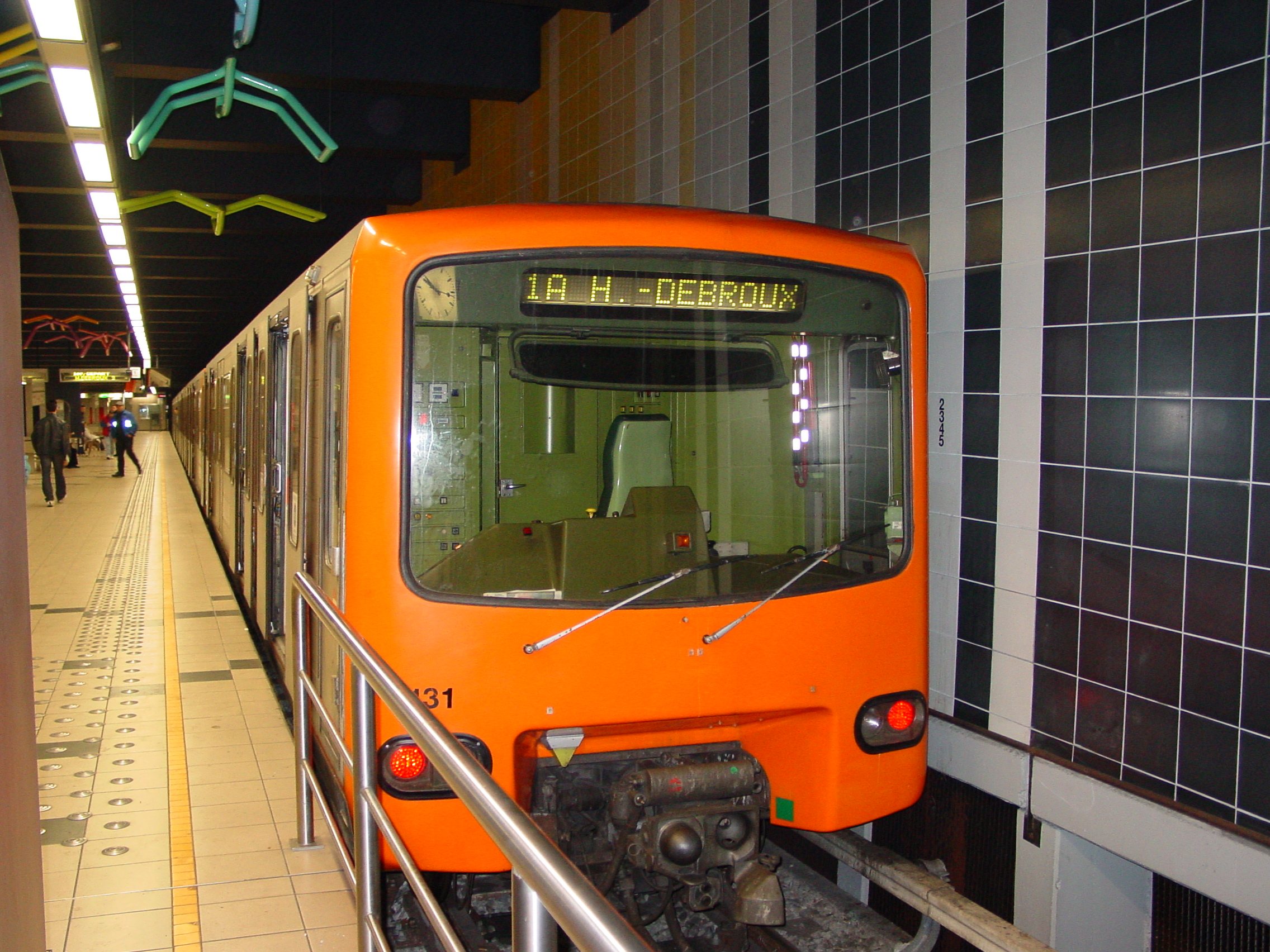
- Roi Baudouin/Koning Boudewijn metro station

General information
- Location: Avenue des Amandiers / Amandelbomenlaan; 1020 Laeken, City of Brussels, Brussels-Capital Region, Belgium
- Coordinates: 50°53′47″N 4°19′40″E
- Owner: STIB/MIVB
- Platforms: 1 island platform
- Tracks: 2

Construction
- Structure type: Underground

History
- Opened: 25 August 1998; 28 years ago

Services
| Preceding station | Brussels Metro | Following station |
|---|---|---|
| Heysel/Heizel towards Elisabeth | Line 6 | Terminus |
Location

King Baudouin (French: Roi Baudouin, pronounced [ʁwa bodwɛ̃]; Dutch: Koning Boudewijn, pronounced [ˈkoːnɪŋ ˈbʌudəʋɛin]) is a Brussels Metro station serving as the northern terminus of line 6. It is located in Laeken, in the north-west of the City of Brussels, Belgium, and serves the King Baudouin Stadium (formerly known as the Heysel Stadium).

The metro station opened on 25 August 1998 as part of the extension of former line 1A. Then, following the reorganisation of the Brussels Metro on 4 April 2009, it is served by line 6.

== See also ==
- Transport in Brussels
- History of Brussels
