= Transport in Brussels =

Overview of transportation in the Brussels-Capital Region, Belgium

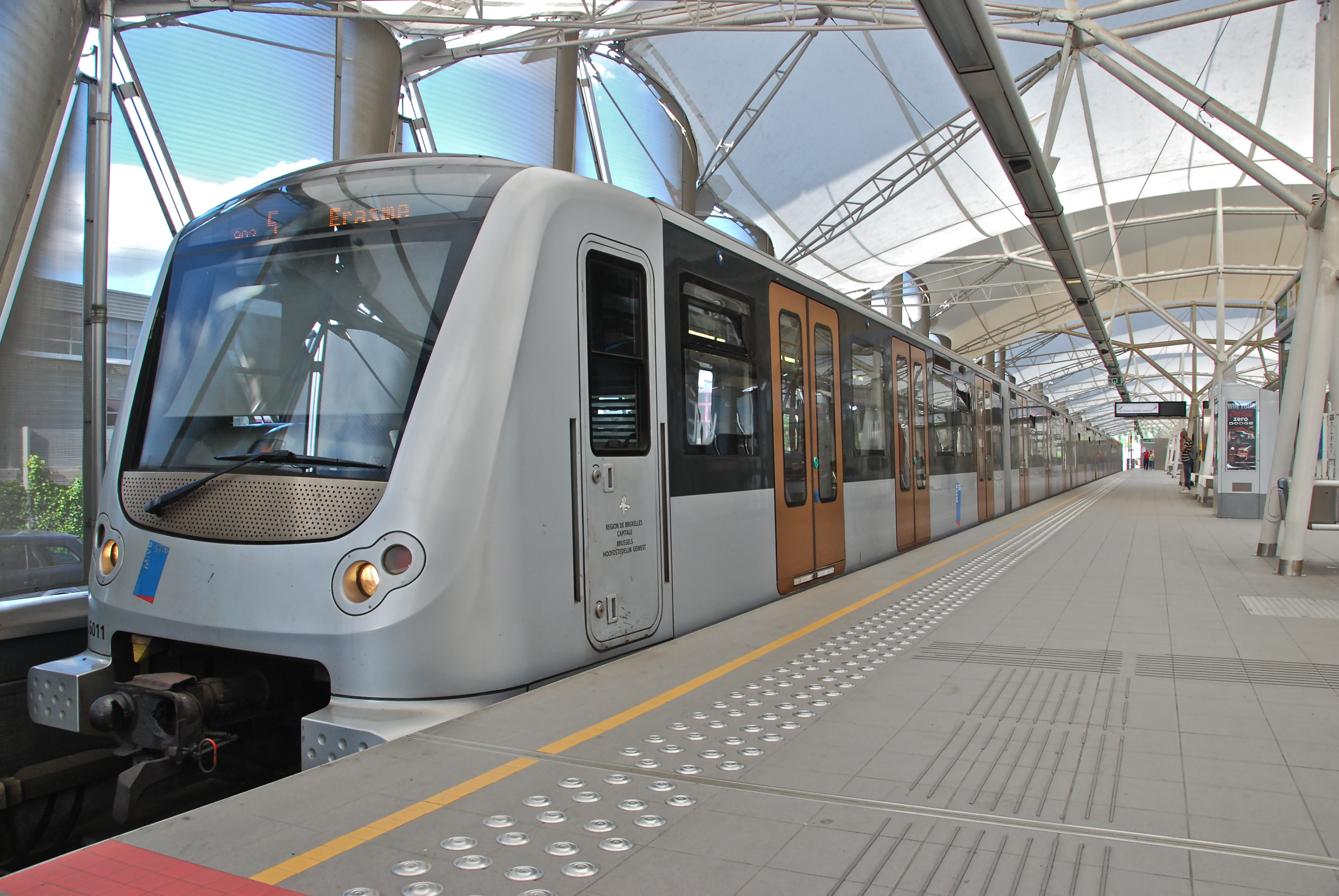
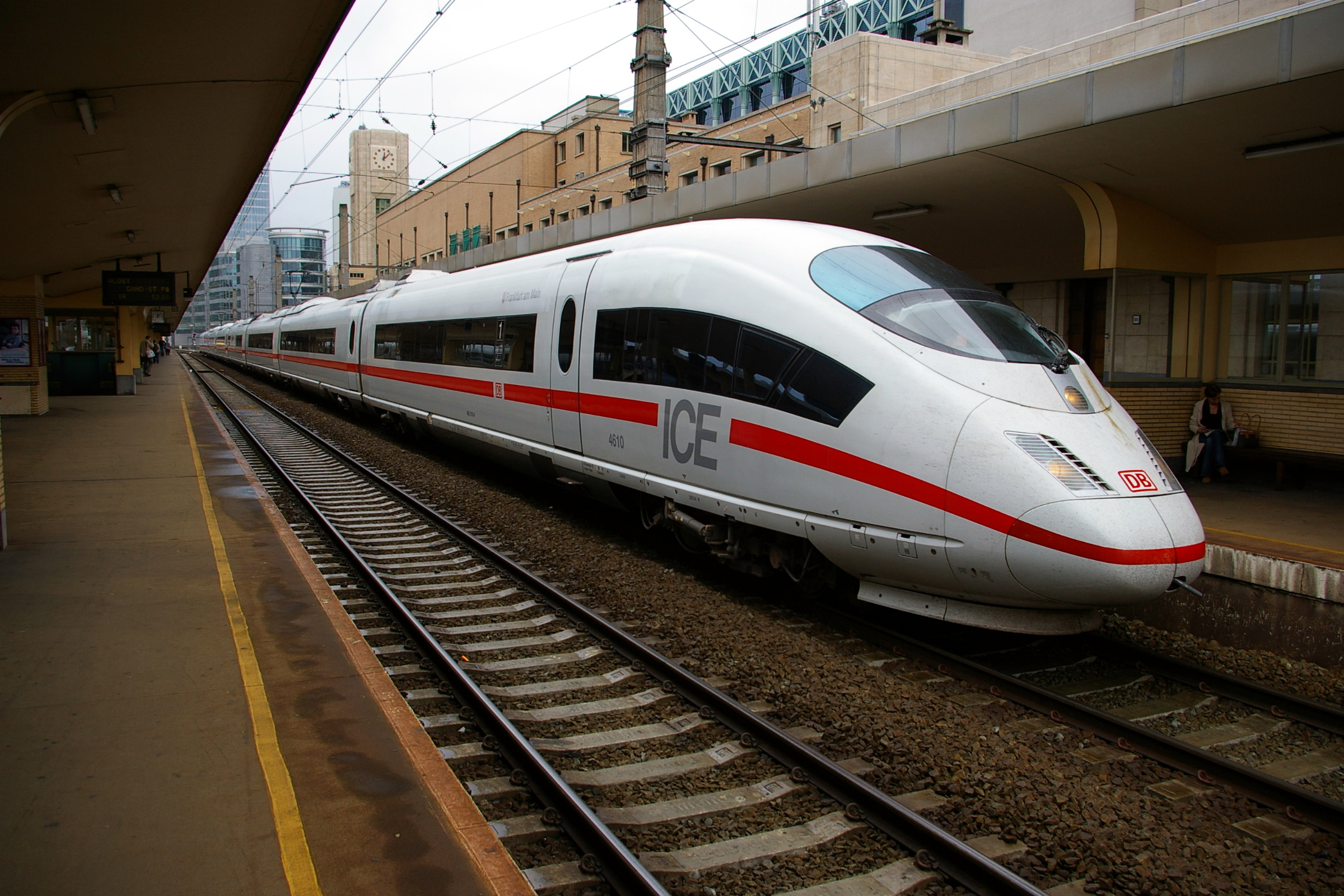
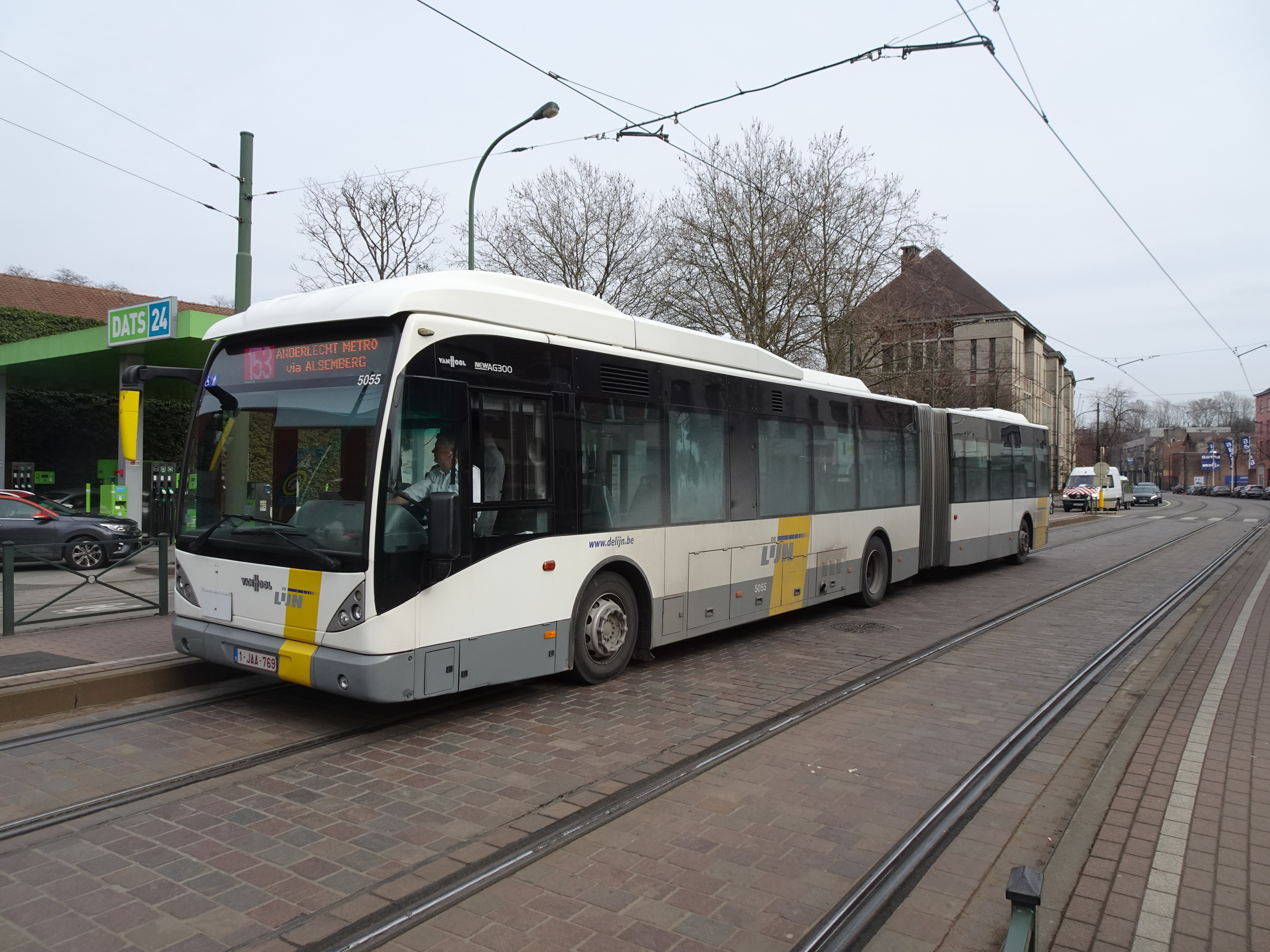
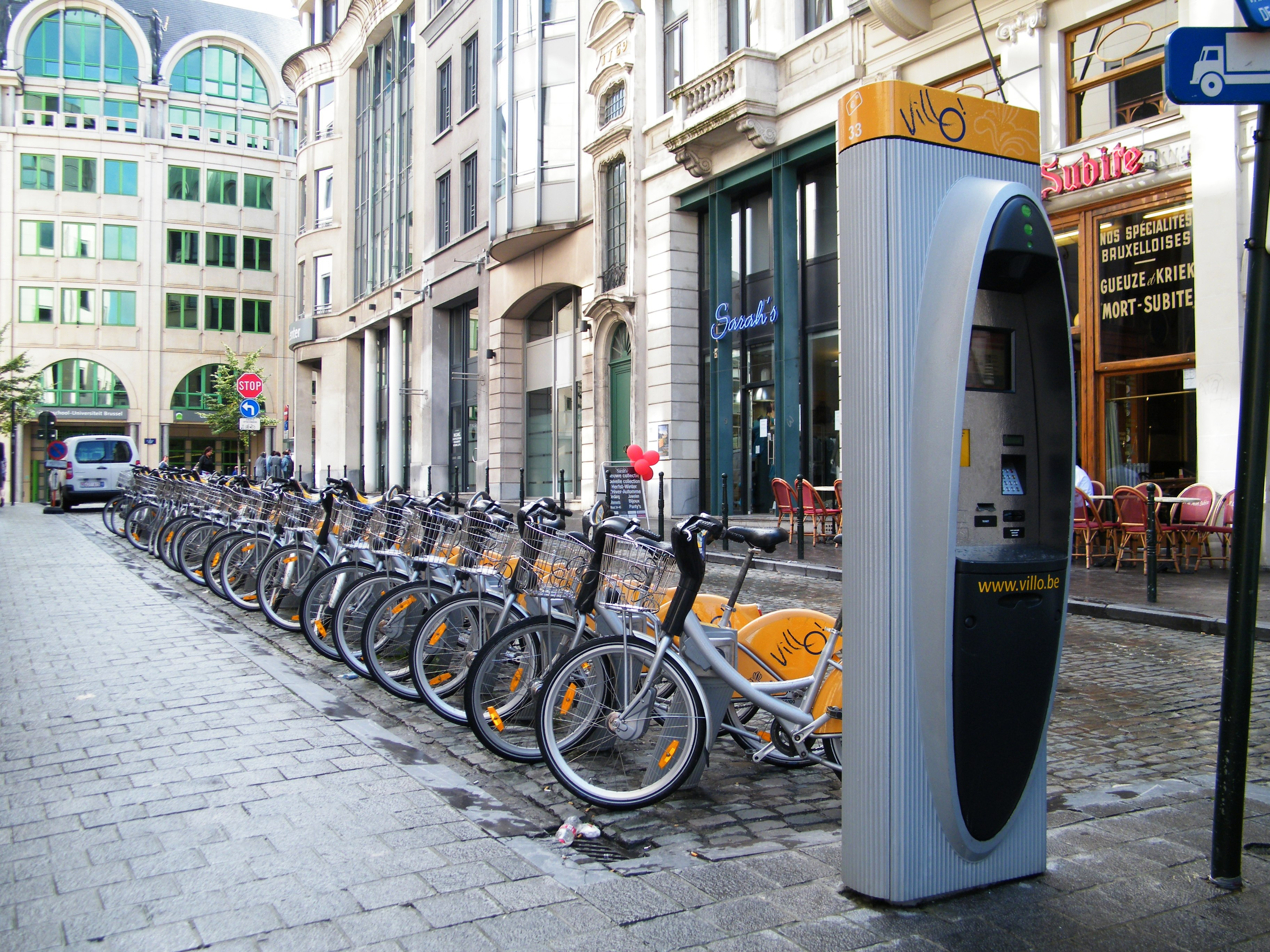
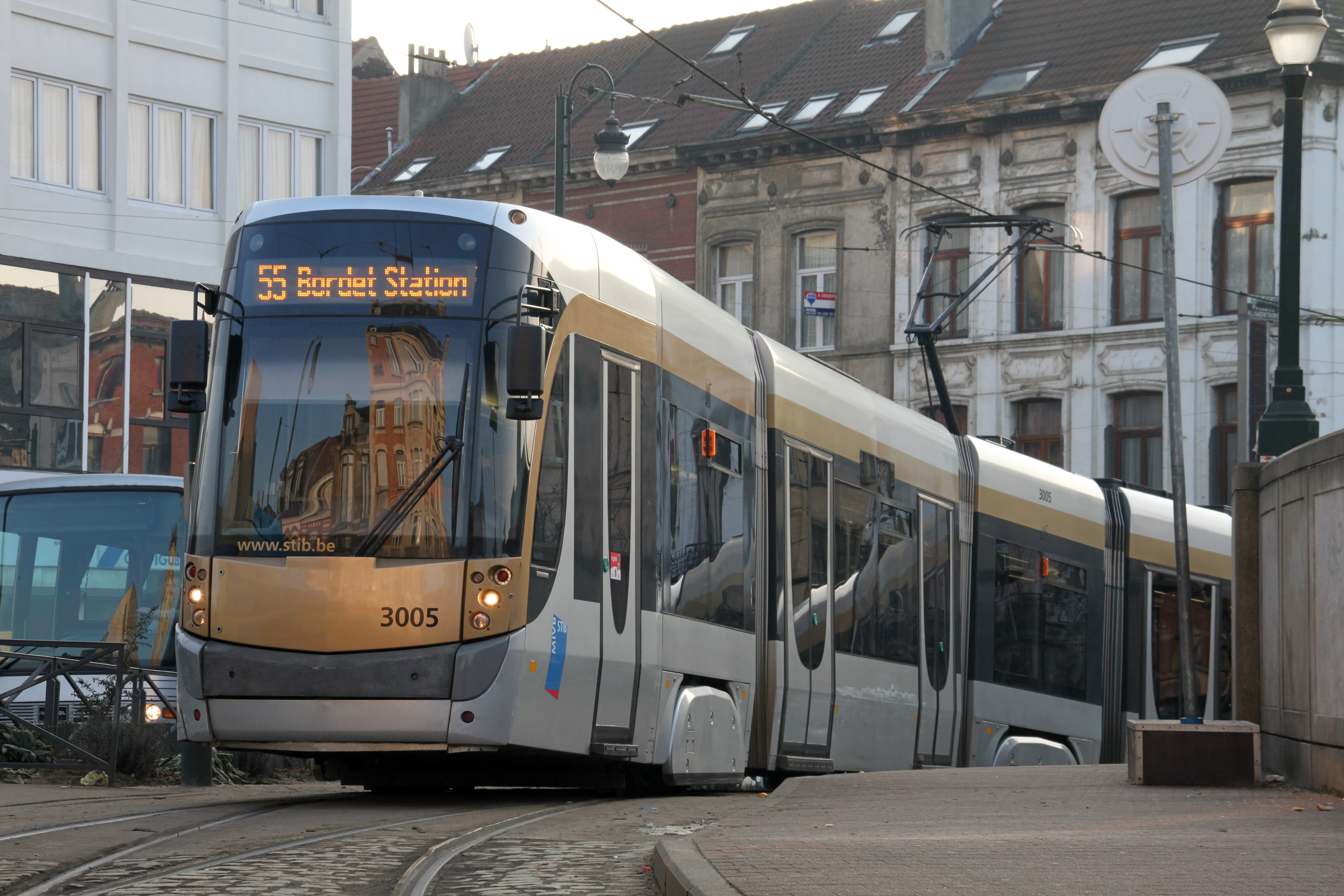
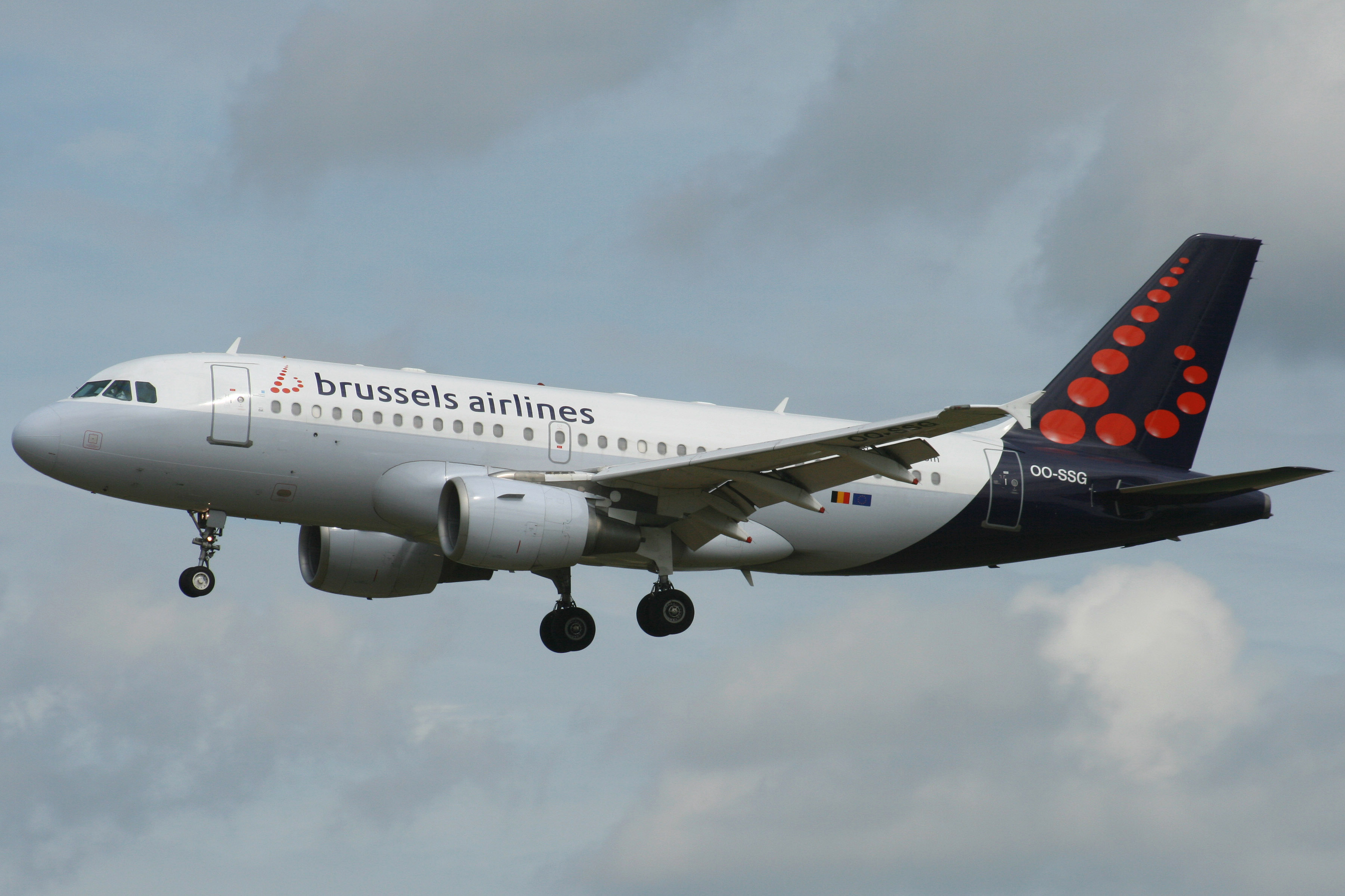
Clockwise from top left: Brussels Metro carriage at Erasme/Erasmus metro station; ICE train at Brussels-North railway station; Villo! bike rental station; Brussels Airlines Airbus A319 landing at Brussels Airport; Bombardier T3000 tram; NewAG300 De Lijn bus

Brussels has an extensive network of both private or public transportation means. Public transportation includes Brussels buses, trams, and metro (all three operated by STIB/MIVB), as well as a set of railway lines (operated by Infrabel) and railway stations served by public trains (operated by the SNCB/NMBS). Air transport is available via one of the city's two airports (Brussels Airport and Brussels South Charleroi Airport), and boat transport is available via the Port of Brussels. Bicycle-sharing and car-sharing public systems are also available. The city is relatively car-dependent by northern European standards and is considered to be the most congested city in the world according to the INRIX traffic survey.

The complexity of the Belgian political landscape makes some transportation issues difficult to solve. The Brussels-Capital Region is surrounded by the Flemish and Walloon regions, which means that the airports, as well as many roads serving Brussels (most notably the Brussels Ring) are located in the other two Belgian regions. In the Brussels Region itself, two ministers are responsible for transport: one for public transport and the Port of Brussels and another for other transportation topics.

== Metro and light rail ==
=== Brussels Metro ===
Development of the Brussels Metro up to 2006

The Brussels Metro, which is operated by the Brussels Intercommunal Transport Company (STIB/MIVB), was first opened in 1976. It has been expanding since to comprise, as of 2009, a set of four metro lines serving a total of 60 metro stations, most of which are underground. Line 1 connects Gare de l'Ouest/Weststation to the east of the city. Line 2 runs in a loop around the city centre. Line 5 runs between the west to the south-east of the city via the centre. Line 6 connects the King Baudouin Stadium at the north-west of Brussels, to the city centre, ending by a loop around the centre in the same way as line 2. Lines 4 and 10 are operated as premetro tramways.

=== Brussels trams ===
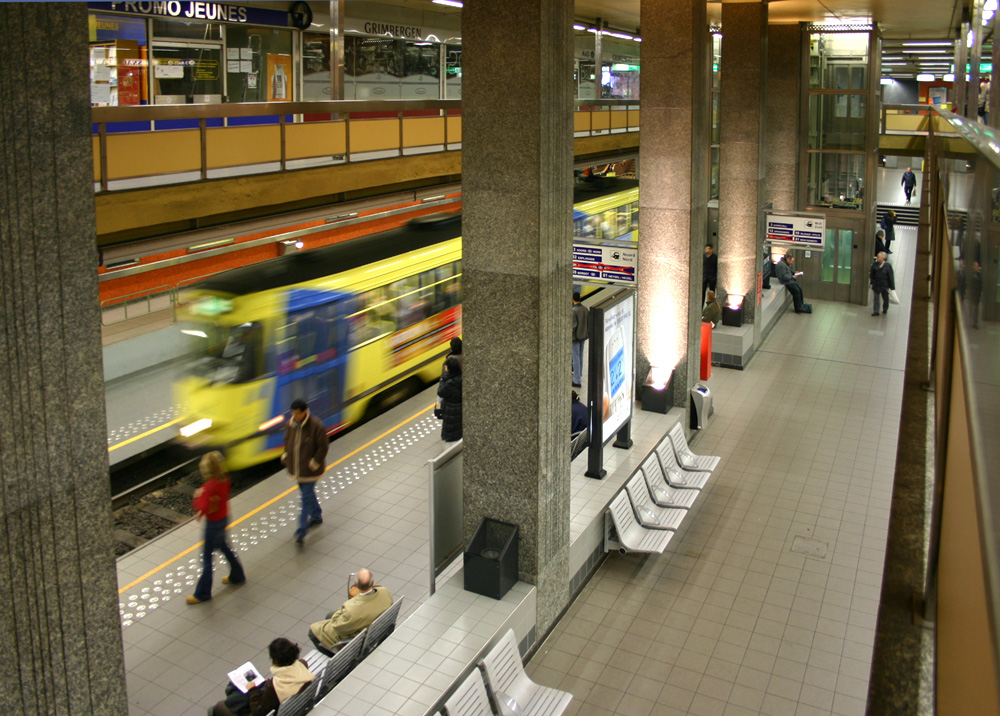
A tram arriving at De Brouckère premetro station

Brussels' trams constitute a historic means of transportation in Brussels, having been operated by STIB/MIVB from 1954 on, but existing in some shape or form since 1869. The Brussels tram network has evolved significantly over time, from a rise in the first half of the 20th century (246 km (153 mi) of tram rails were serviced in 1955) to a fall in the second half of the 20th century due to the popularisation of transport by bus and by car. In 1988 only 134 km (83 mi) of tram rails remained in Brussels. Finally, the reduced tram network was extended in the late 2000s with the extension of existing lines from 131 km (81 mi) in 2007 to 140.6 km (87.4 mi) in 2017.

== Heavy rail ==
The Infrabel railway network has a total of eight lines used by passenger trains, which lie partly or completely within the region of Brussels. Those lines serve a total of 29 railway stations in Brussels, all of which are operated by the National Railway Company of Belgium (SNCB/NMBS) and offer connections with one or more STIB/MIVB bus, tram and/or metro lines. This system is planned to be upgraded to the Brussels Regional Express Network (RER/GEN). Brussels-South railway station is a major station on the European High Speed train network, served by TGV, Thalys, Eurostar and ICE high speed train services.

== Buses ==
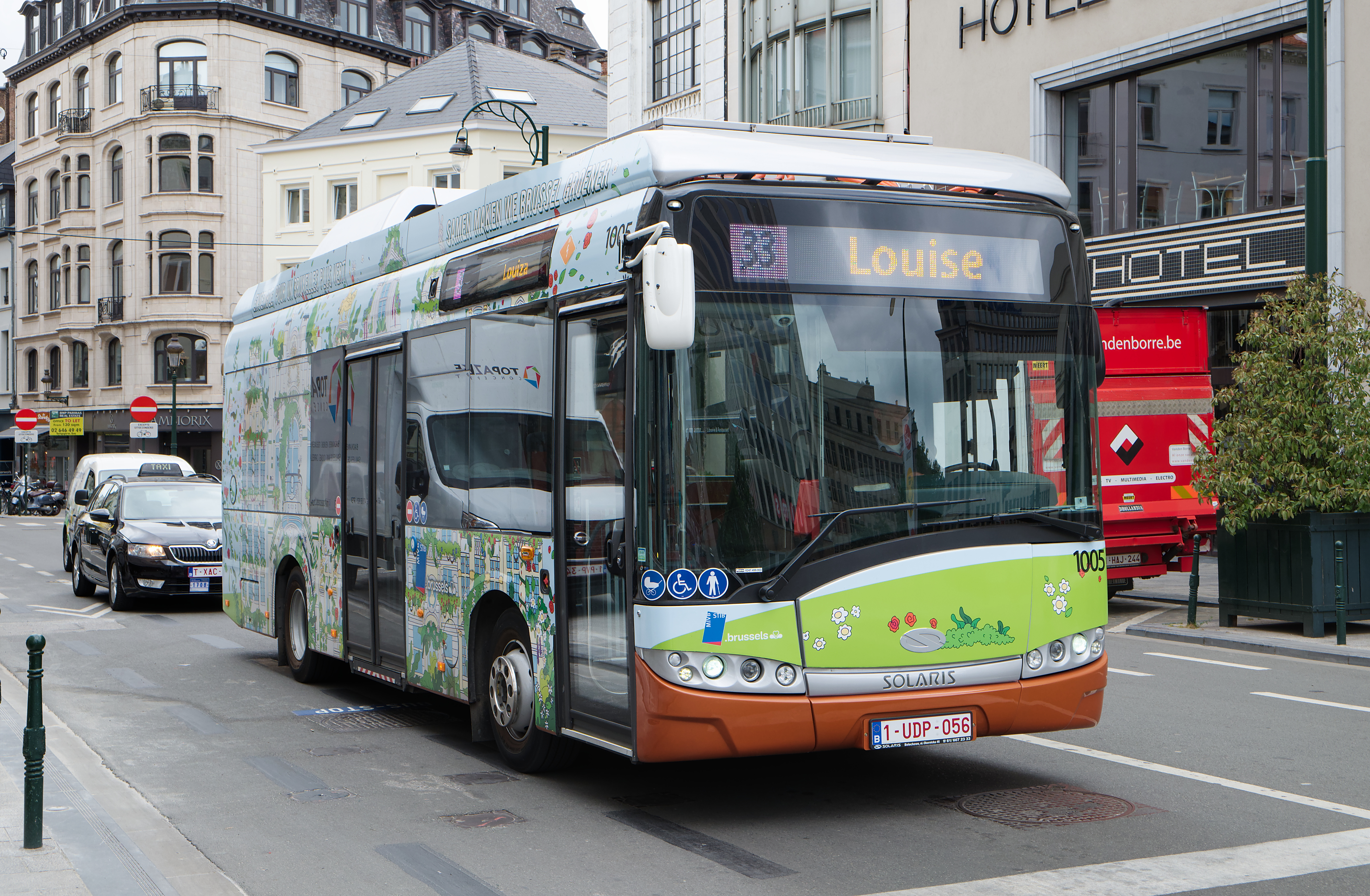
Solaris electric bus operated by STIB/MIVB on line 33

The first Brussels bus ran in 1907 from the Bourse Palace to Ixelles' Municipal Hall. The Brussels bus network now comprises 360 km (220 mi) of bus line by day and 112 km (70 mi) by night as of 2008, and service the 19 municipalities of Brussels. Buses operated by the Walloon (TEC) and Flemish (De Lijn) public transport companies also run in Brussels in order to allow Walloon and Flemish people to go to the capital city.

== Roads ==
Brussels has the most congested traffic in North America and Europe according to a 2012 study by the US traffic information platform INRIX.

Roads in Brussels range from highways leading to neighbouring countries or cities (the European routes E40, E411 and E19 plus the A12 and A201 highways) to national roads, major roads down to local streets. Brussels is surrounded by the Brussels Ring, and is crossed by two smaller orbital roads: the Greater Ring and the Small Ring.

Brussels buses, trams, taxis, cars and bicycles share the road network in Brussels. A car-sharing system is operated by the Bremen company Cambio, in partnership with STIB/MIVB and the local ridesharing company Taxi Stop.

== Airports ==
Brussels is served by two airports, both located outside of the administrative territory of the region. The most notable is Brussels Airport, located in the nearby Flemish municipality of Zaventem, 12 km (10 mi) east of the capital, which can be accessed by highway (A201), train and bus. The secondary airport is Brussels South Charleroi Airport, located in Gosselies, a part of the city of Charleroi (Wallonia), some 50 km (30 mi) south-west of Brussels, which can be accessed by highway (E19 then E420) or a private bus. There is also Melsbroek Air Base, located in Steenokkerzeel, a military airport which shares its infrastructure with Brussels Airport. The aforementioned airports are also the main airports of Belgium.

== Water transport ==
Brussels has its own port and is crossed by the Brussels–Charleroi Canal and the Brussels–Scheldt Maritime Canal (commonly called the Willebroek Canal), which connects Brussels to Antwerp via the Scheldt.

== Cycling ==
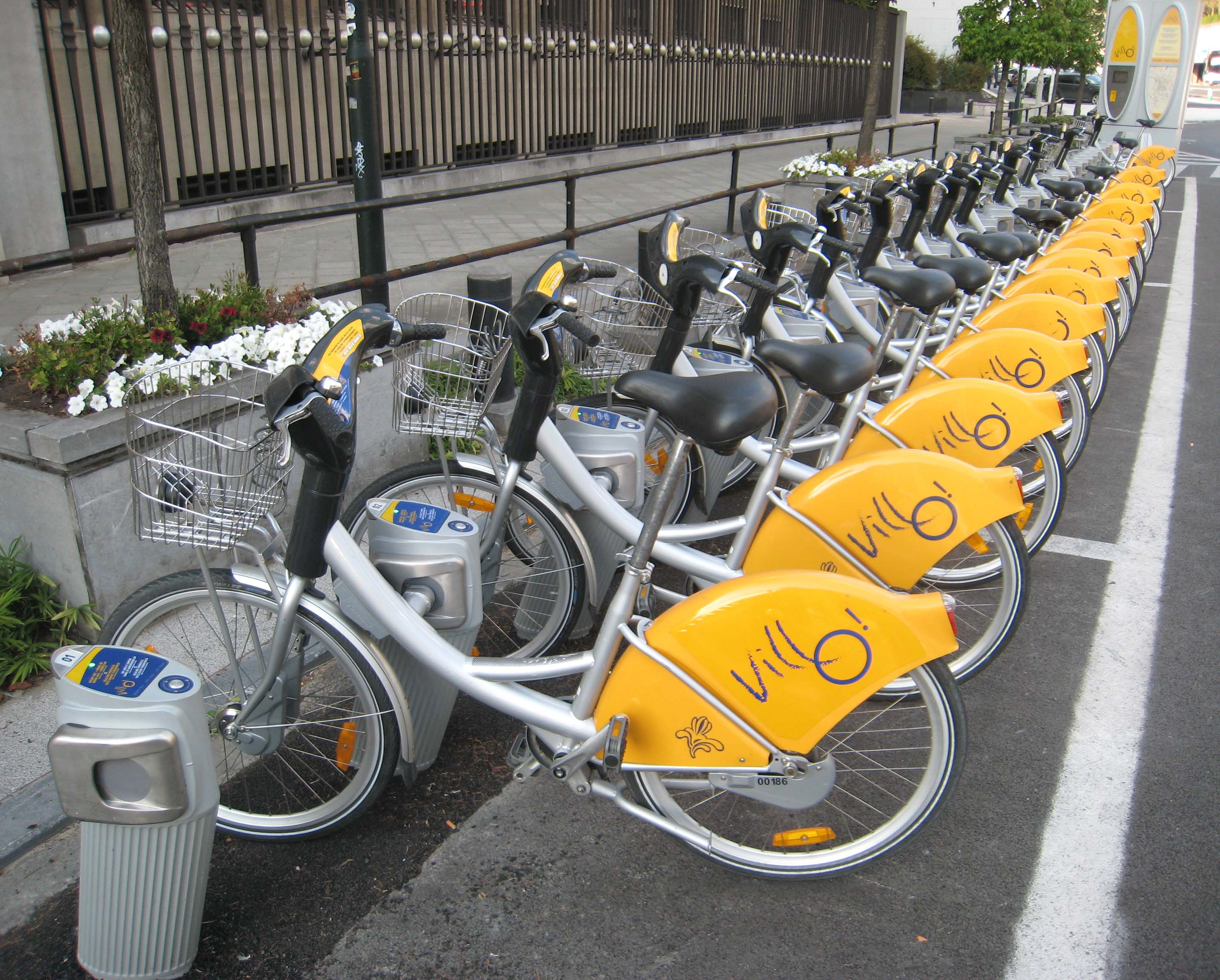
Villo! shared bicycles in Brussels

Brussels is characterised by a relatively low level of cycling compared to Flanders and many other north-western European cities. In 2013, the modal share was about 3.5% of all trips within Brussels, and 2.5% of all trips within, and entering/exiting the city. However, the rate has increased significantly in recent years. Since 2009, a bicycle-sharing system named Villo! has been made available to the public.

Brussels has a high number of cycling accidents compared with Belgian rural areas but due to the urban context, though most cycling accidents in Brussels result in only slight injuries.

== See also ==
- Transport in Belgium
