= Brussels Intercommunal Transport Company =

Local public transport operator in Brussels, Belgium

Brussels Intercommunal Transport Company Société des Transports Intercommunaux de Bruxelles (STIB) Maatschappij voor het Intercommunaal Vervoer te Brussel (MIVB)

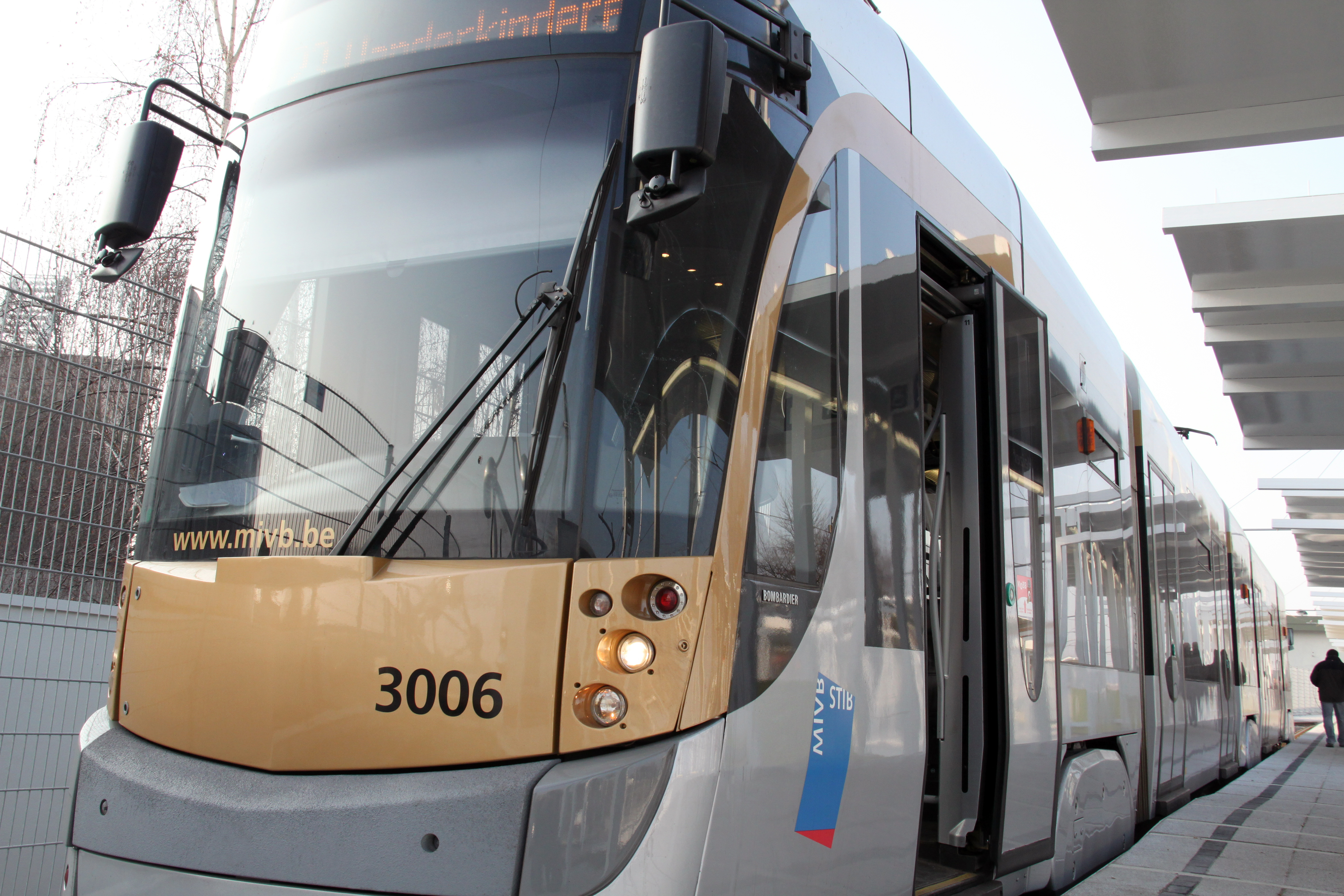
- A Cityrunner, part of STIB/MIVB's rolling stock

Overview
- Locale: Brussels, Belgium
- Transit type: Tram, bus and metro
- Annual ridership: 400.9 million (2017)
- Website: www.stib-mivb.be/home

Operation
- Began operation: 1954; 72 years ago

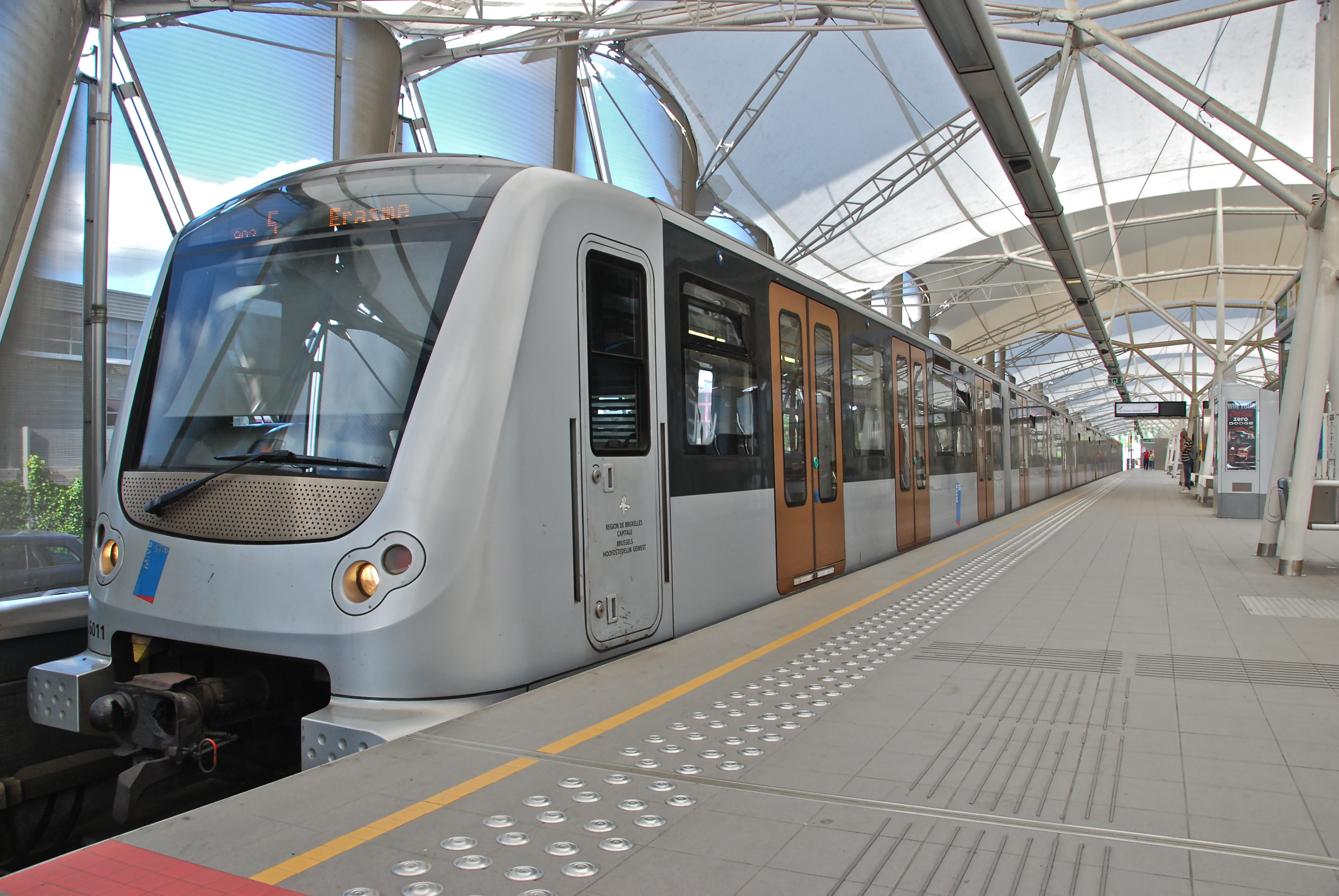
Brussels Metro carriage at Erasme/Erasmus metro station

The Brussels Intercommunal Transport Company (French: Société des Transports Intercommunaux de Bruxelles (Note: French pronunciation: [sɔsjete de tʁɑ̃spɔʁ ɛ̃tɛʁkɔmyno də bʁysɛl].) or STIB; Dutch: Maatschappij voor het Intercommunaal Vervoer te Brussel (Note: Dutch pronunciation: [ˌmaːtsxɑˈpɛi voːr (ɦ)ət ˌɪntərkɔmyˈnaːl vərˈvuːr tə ˈbrʏsəl].) or MIVB) is the local public transport operator in Brussels, Belgium. It is usually referred to in English by the double acronym STIB/MIVB, or by its French acronym, STIB.

STIB/MIVB is responsible for the Brussels Metro, Brussels trams and Brussels buses, linking with the De Lijn network in Flanders and the TEC network in Wallonia.

== History and operation ==
Founded in 1954, STIB/MIVB operates 4 metro lines, 17 tram lines and 55 bus lines, along with 11 "Noctis" bus lines (as of April 2023). It covers the 19 municipalities of the Brussels-Capital Region and some surface routes extend to the near suburbs in the other regions. 329 million trips were made in 2011, a 5.6% increase from the previous year. Ridership has increased sharply in recent years to 370 million trips in 2015. Peak ridership was attained in 2019 with 427.5 million journeys. During the COVID-19 pandemic in Belgium, ridership dropped below 250 million in 2020. Ridership is recovering, with 273.8 million journeys in 2021 (64% of ridership recorded in 2019) and 401.9 million journeys in 2024.

In 1991, STIB/MIVB had a farebox recovery ratio of 28%. In 2009, following annual increases of 1.56% in passenger journeys and 2.4% in direct revenue, fares covered 54.8% of operating costs.

=== Transamo ===
STIB/MIVB is a shareholder of Transamo, a transport engineering and consultancy firm in Europe that specialises in the project management of public transport projects in France. Transdev is the other major shareholder of Transamo.
