= Marc Sleen Museum =

Comics museum in Brussels, Belgium

- Musée Marc Sleen (French); Marc Sleen Museum (Dutch)
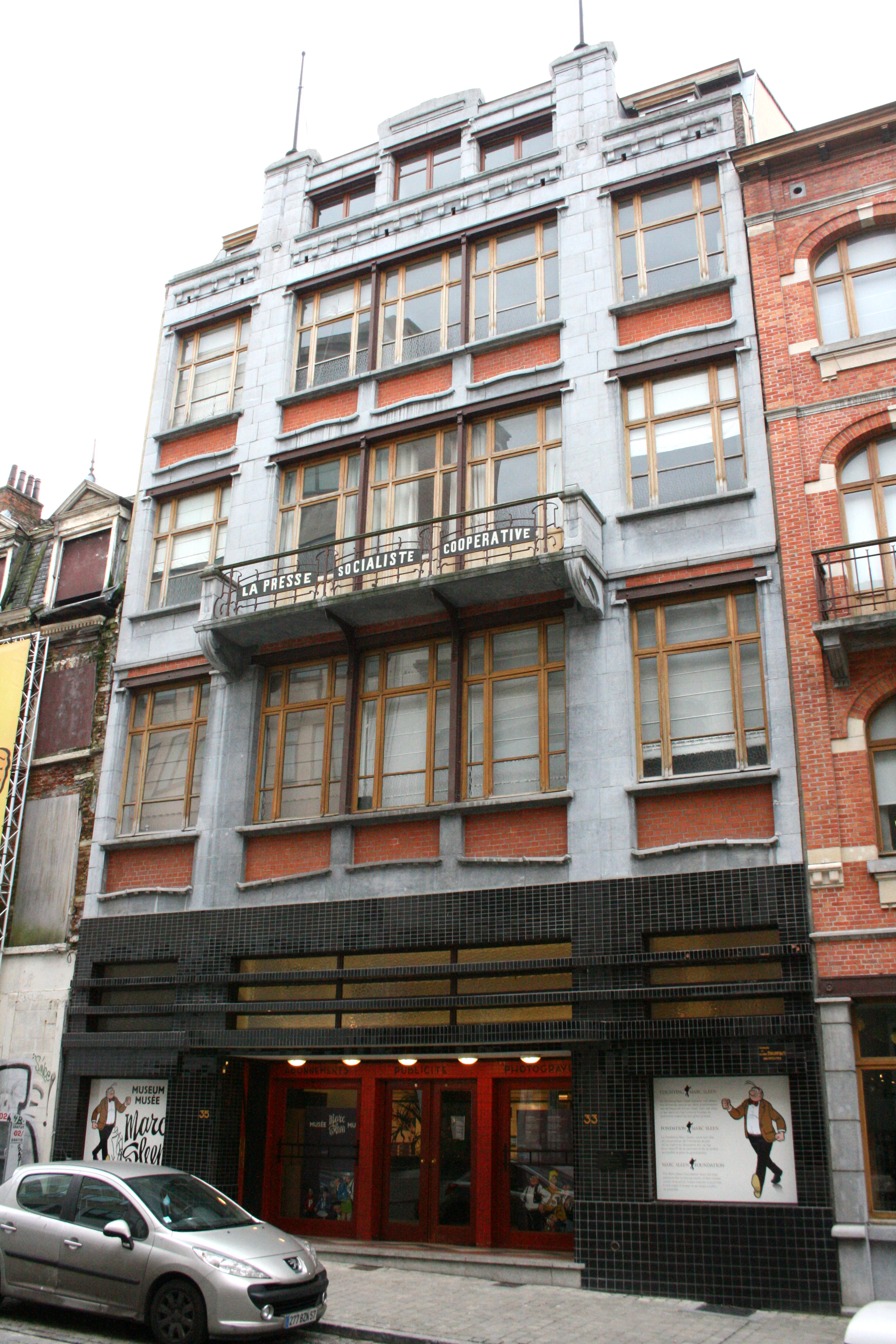
- Exterior of the museum
- Interactive fullscreen map
- Established: 19 June 2009; 17 years ago
- Dissolved: 2024; 2 years ago
- Location: Rue des Sables / Zandstraat 33–35, 1000 City of Brussels, Brussels-Capital Region, Belgium
- Coordinates: 50°51′03″N 4°21′37″E
- Type: Belgian comics
- Public transit access: Brussels-Congress and Brussels-Central; 1 5 Gare Centrale/Centraal Station
- Website: www.marcsleen.be/en

The Marc Sleen Museum (French: Musée Marc Sleen; Dutch: Marc Sleen Museum) was a museum in Brussels, Belgium, dedicated to the work of comics artist Marc Sleen, who is known for his series The Adventures of Nero, Piet Fluwijn en Bolleke and De Lustige Kapoentjes. Founded in 2009, it was located across the street from the Belgian Comic Strip Center at 33–35, rue des Sables/Zandstraat. It closed permanently in 2024.

== History ==
On 19 June 2009, the Marc Sleen Museum was opened to the public, with the presence of Marc Sleen, as well as King Albert II. The king was a fan of The Adventures of Nero comic book series since his youth and both him and his brother, King Baudouin, learned Dutch by reading Nero.

The museum's location was symbolic, since Marc Sleen started his career as cartoonist in 1947 whilst working for the newspaper De Nieuwe Gids, whose office was located on the Rue des Sables/Zandstraat. The original building was erected in Art Nouveau style by the architects Fernand Brunfaut and his son Maxime Brunfaut.

The museum failed to meet the expected success. In the early years, it attracted barely 3,000 visitors a year, and even later, visitor numbers remained well below the target of 25,000. On 30 January 2023, it was announced that the museum would close in the autumn, with part of its collection being integrated into the Belgian Comic Strip Center. In 2024, the museum closed permanently.

== Exhibition ==
The museum was managed by the Marc Sleen Foundation (French: Fondation Marc Sleen, Dutch: Stichting Marc Sleen). It exhibited original artwork and memorabilia by Marc Sleen, as well as an overview of his career, including the nature documentaries he made for the TV show Allemaal Beestjes ("All kinds of animals"). About 15,000 drawings were archived in the cellars and were available for temporary exhibitions.

The museum had a reading corner for children. Comic book albums by Sleen could be bought as well. One specific story, Het Spook uit de Zandstraat ("The Ghost of the Zandstraat") has been translated into English, French and German, and was made available as a souvenir for tourists. Temporary exhibitions were also organised.

== Marc Sleen Route ==
The museum organised a special tourist route in Brussels, based on several locations featured in the Nero albums, including the Black Tower, the Palace of Justice, the Chapel Church, the Sablon/Zavel, the Central Station, the Grand-Place/Grote Markt and Manneken Pis.

== See also ==
- List of museums in Brussels
- Brussels' Comic Book Route
- Art Nouveau in Brussels
- History of Brussels
- Culture of Belgium
- Belgium in the long nineteenth century
