= Parc metro station (Brussels) =

Metro station in Brussels, Belgium

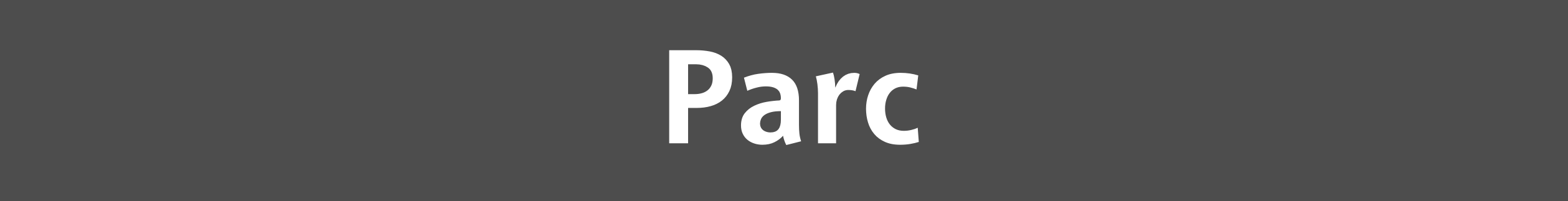
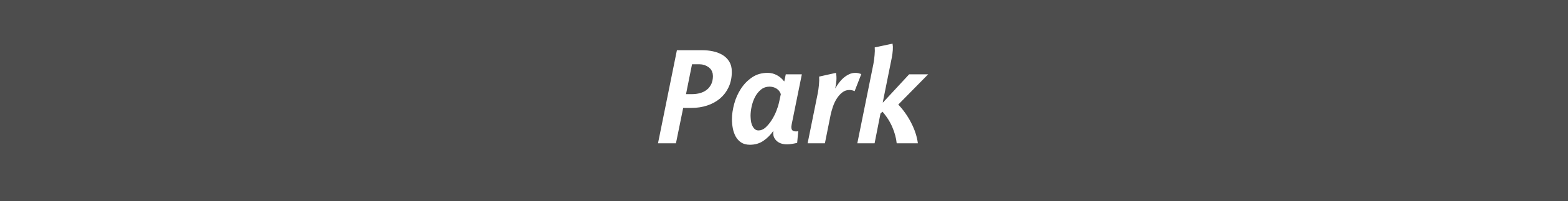

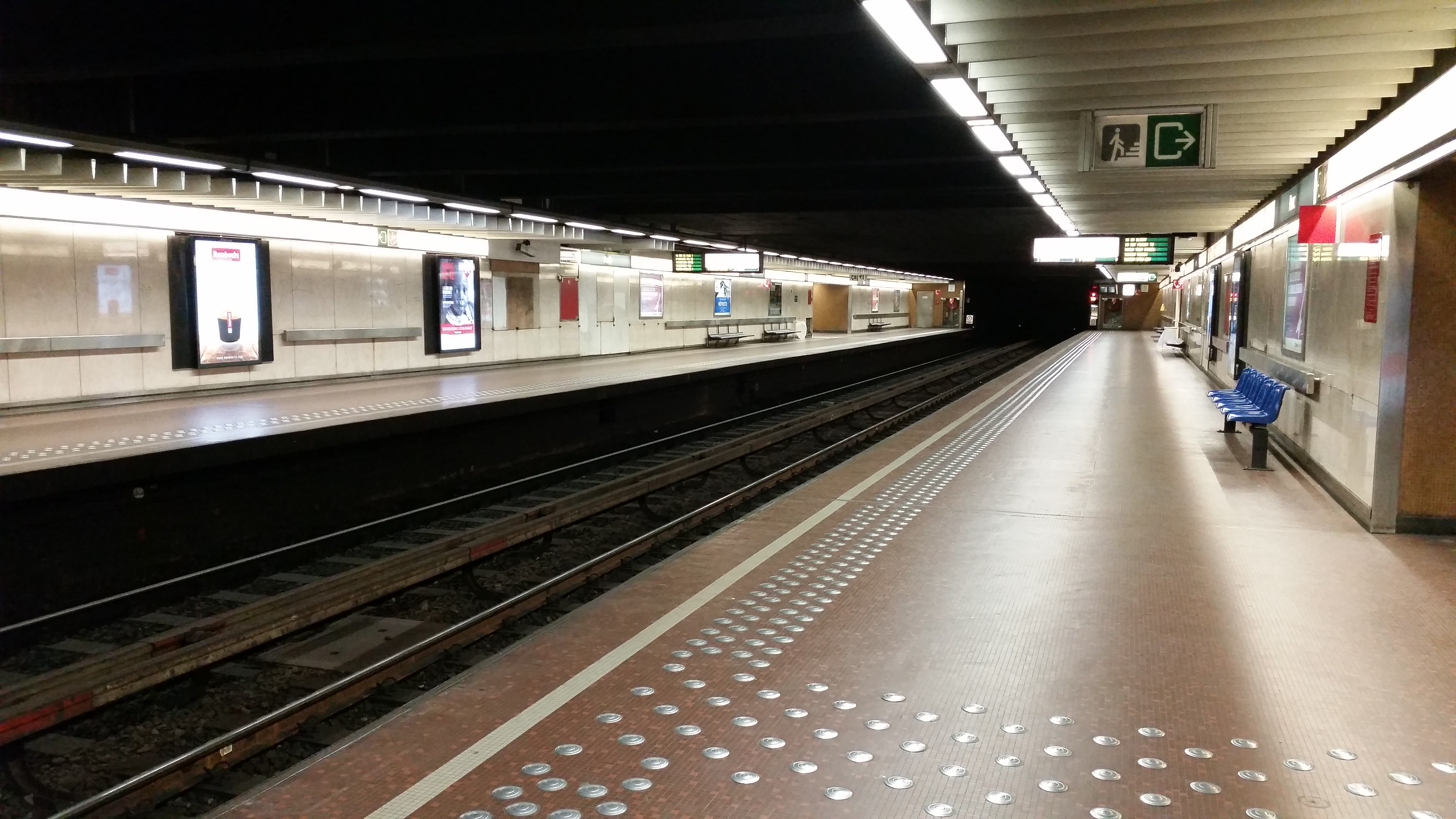
- Parc/Park metro station

General information
- Location: Rue Royale / Koningsstraat; 1000 City of Brussels, Brussels-Capital Region, Belgium
- Coordinates: 50°50′48″N 4°21′45″E
- Owner: STIB/MIVB

History
- Opened: 17 December 1969; 56 years ago (premetro); 20 September 1976; 49 years ago (metro)

Services
Preceding station	Brussels Metro	Following station
Gare Centrale/Centraal Station towards Gare de l'Ouest/Weststation	Line 1	Arts-Loi/Kunst-Wet towards Stockel/Stokkel
Gare Centrale/Centraal Station towards Erasme/Erasmus	Line 5	Arts-Loi/Kunst-Wet towards Herrmann-Debroux
Location

Parc (French, pronounced [paʁk]) or Park (Dutch, pronounced [pɑr(ə)k]) is a Brussels Metro station on lines 1 and 5. It is located under Brussels Park in central Brussels, Belgium. It has one entrance, at the intersection of the Rue Royale/Koningsstraat and the Rue de la Loi/Wetstraat, two of the main roads of the City of Brussels.

The station opened on 17 December 1969 as a premetro (underground tram) station on the tram line between De Brouckère and Schuman. This station was upgraded to full metro status on 20 September 1976, serving former east–west line 1 (further split in 1982 into former lines 1A and 1B). Then, following the reorganisation of the Brussels Metro on 4 April 2009, it now lies on the joint section of east–west lines 1 and 5.

== History ==
Parc/Park station was inaugurated on 17 December 1969 as a premetro station (i.e. a station served by underground tramways), as part of the first underground public transport route in Belgium, which initially stretched from De Brouckère to Schuman. On 20 September 1976, this premetro line was converted into a heavy metro line, which was later split into two distinct lines on 6 October 1982: former lines 1A and 1B, both serving Parc/Park. On 4 April 2009, metro operation was restructured and the station is now served by metro lines 1 and 5.

When the station was first built, there was a plan to eventually construct a connecting line along the route of the Rue Royale/Koningsstraat. To provide for this line, a much larger underground space was excavated than necessary for a simple station. The Rue Royale line was quickly cancelled, and the underground chambers intended for it now house the Brussels Metro's traffic control centre.

The tunnel between Parc/Park and Arts-Loi/Kunst-Wet stations was the first section of the Brussels metro system to be built using a tunnelling shield. This was done as a test; most parts of the Brussels Metro having been built using open construction methods.

== Area ==
Several places of interest other than the park itself lie near the station: the Royal Palace, the Belgian House of Parliament (Palace of the Nation), the office of the Prime Minister of Belgium, the Royal Park Theatre, and the United States' embassy.

== See also ==
- Transport in Brussels
- History of Brussels
