= Brussels railway station =

There are three main railway stations in Brussels:

- Brussels-North railway station
- Brussels-Central railway station
- Brussels-South railway station
