= Line 0 =

Line 0 or Line Zero may refer to:

- The 42nd Street Shuttle of the New York City Subway, known internally as the 0
- The Loop Line of the Chongqing Rail Transit, symbolized 0 and colloquially known as Line 0 (Chinese: 〇号线)
- The North–South connection in Brussels, numbered line 0 by the National Railway Company of Belgium
