= Brussels-Chapel railway station =

Railway station in Brussels, Belgium

Brussels-Chapel
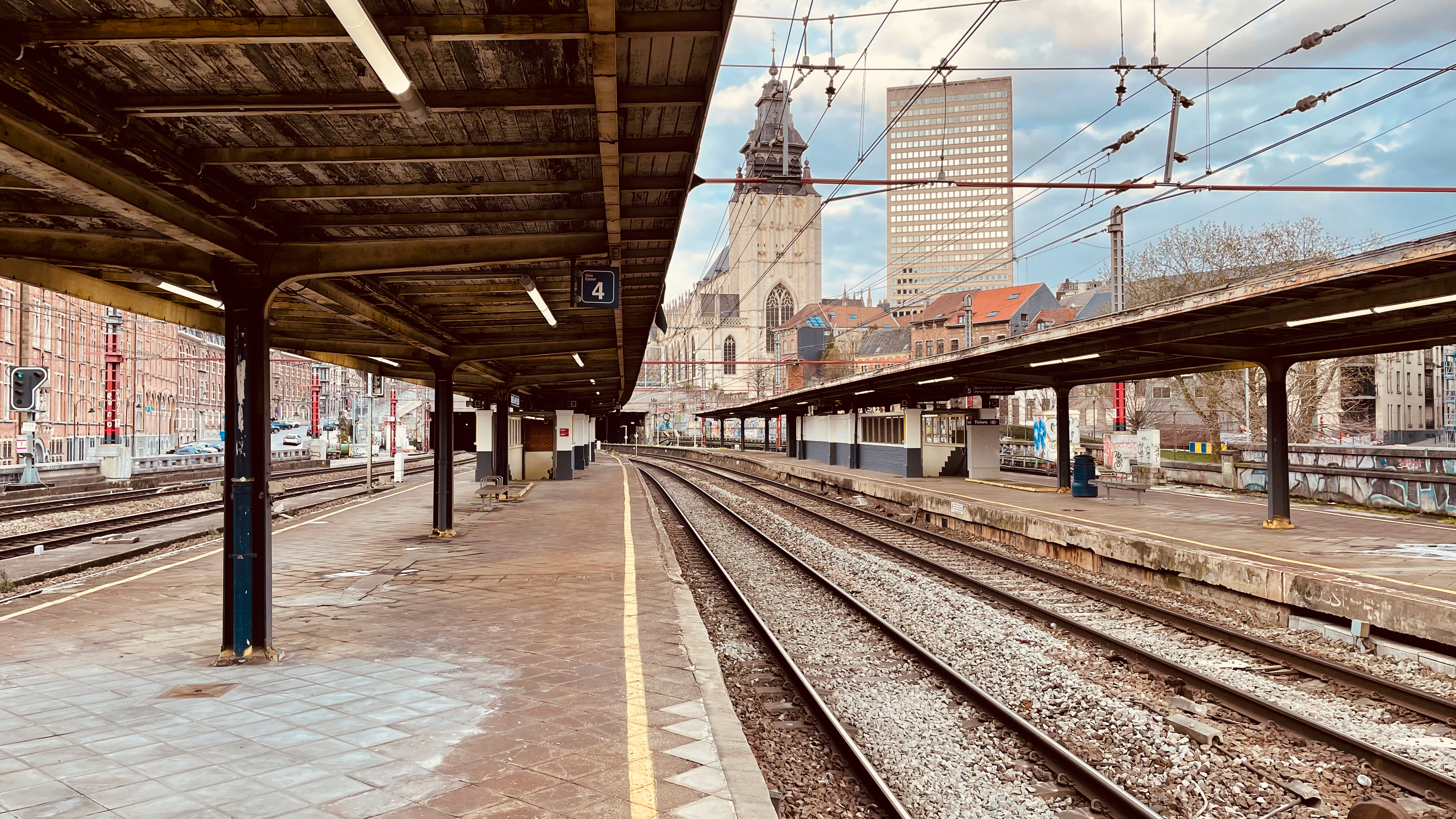
- Brussels-Chapel railway station

General information
- Location: Rue des Ursulines / Ursulinenstraat; 1000 City of Brussels, Brussels-Capital Region; Belgium
- Coordinates: 50°50′28″N 4°20′55″E
- System: Railway Station
- Owner: SNCB/NMBS
- Operator: SNCB/NMBS

Other information
- Website: Official website

History
- Opened: 4 October 1952; 73 years ago

Services
Preceding station	NMBS/SNCB	Following station
Brussels-Central towards Antwerpen-Centraal	S 1	Bruxelles-Midi / Brussel-Zuid towards Nivelles
Location
- Location within Belgium Location within Europe

Brussels-Chapel railway station (French: Gare de Bruxelles-Chapelle; Dutch: Station Brussel-Kapellekerk) (Note: Officially Brussels-Chapel (French: Bruxelles-Chapelle; Dutch: Brussel-Kapellekerk)) is a railway station on the North–South connection in the City of Brussels, Belgium. Despite its city centre location and the busy passing railway line, few trains stop there nowadays. The train services are operated by the National Railway Company of Belgium (SNCB/NMBS).

The station was opened in 1952, following construction of the North–South connection, between the stations of Brussels-Central and Brussels-South. It is situated in the Marolles/Marollen district, and takes its name from the neighbouring Church of Our Lady of the Chapel. Also immediately opposite the station is St John Berchmans College.

== Train services ==
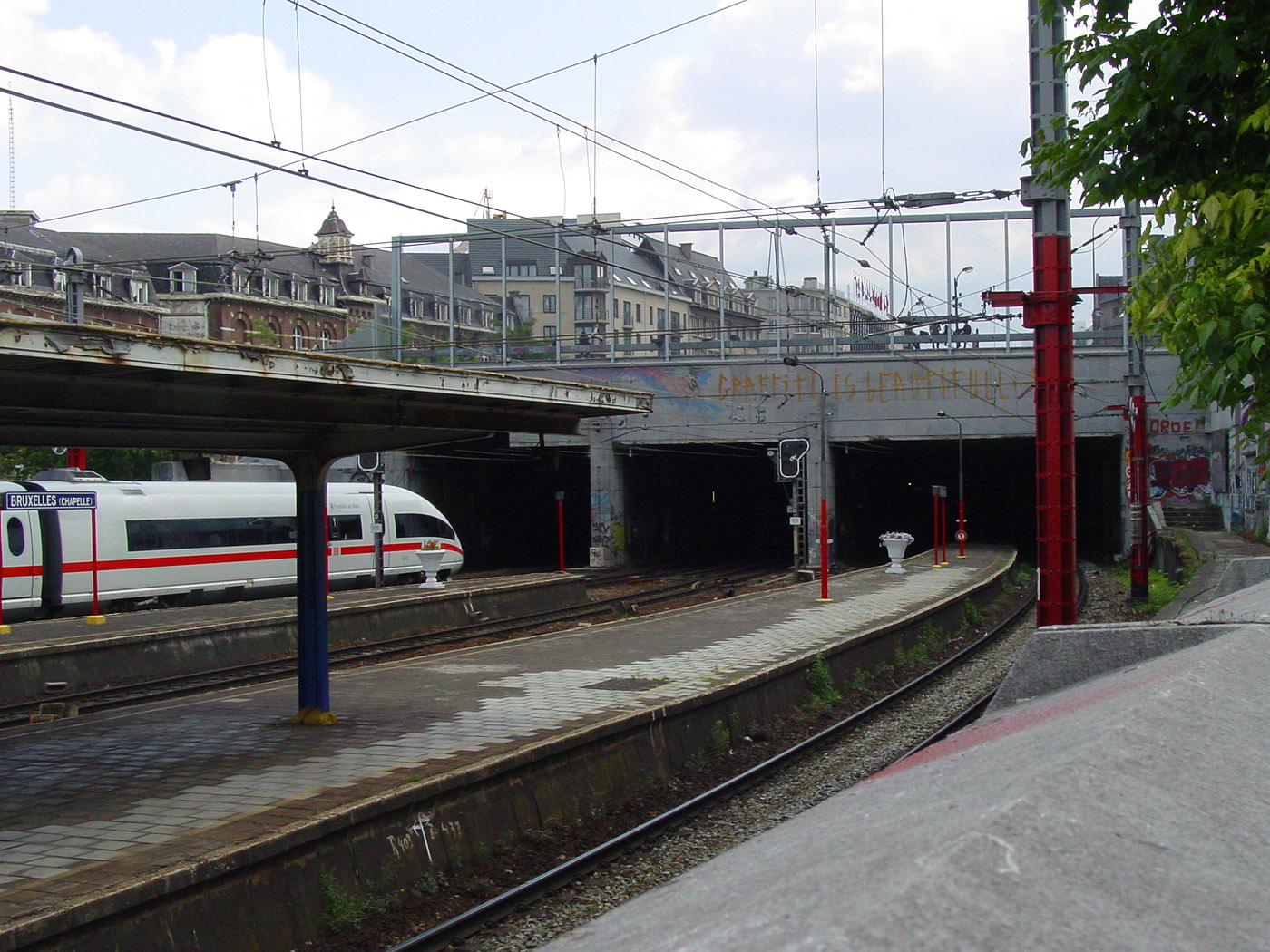
Travelling north, trains enter the main tunnel of the North–South connection as soon as they pass through the station

The station is served by some trains of the S1 line of the Brussels Regional Express Network (RER/GEN). During the week, one train an hour stops in each direction. There is no service at all later in the evenings or at weekends. The stopping trains generally use platforms 5 and 6, the easternmost pair of tracks.

== Recyclart ==
While few trains stop at the station, the buildings beneath the track level have found an alternative use. The Recyclart project, which started in 1997, is a social-cultural space with an urban, DIY feel. It puts on art exhibitions and concerts, provides workshop space to artists of many varieties, and offers food and drink.

== See also ==
- List of railway stations in Belgium
- Rail transport in Belgium
- Transport in Brussels
- History of Brussels
