= Brussels-Congress railway station =

Railway station in Brussels, Belgium

Brussels-Congress
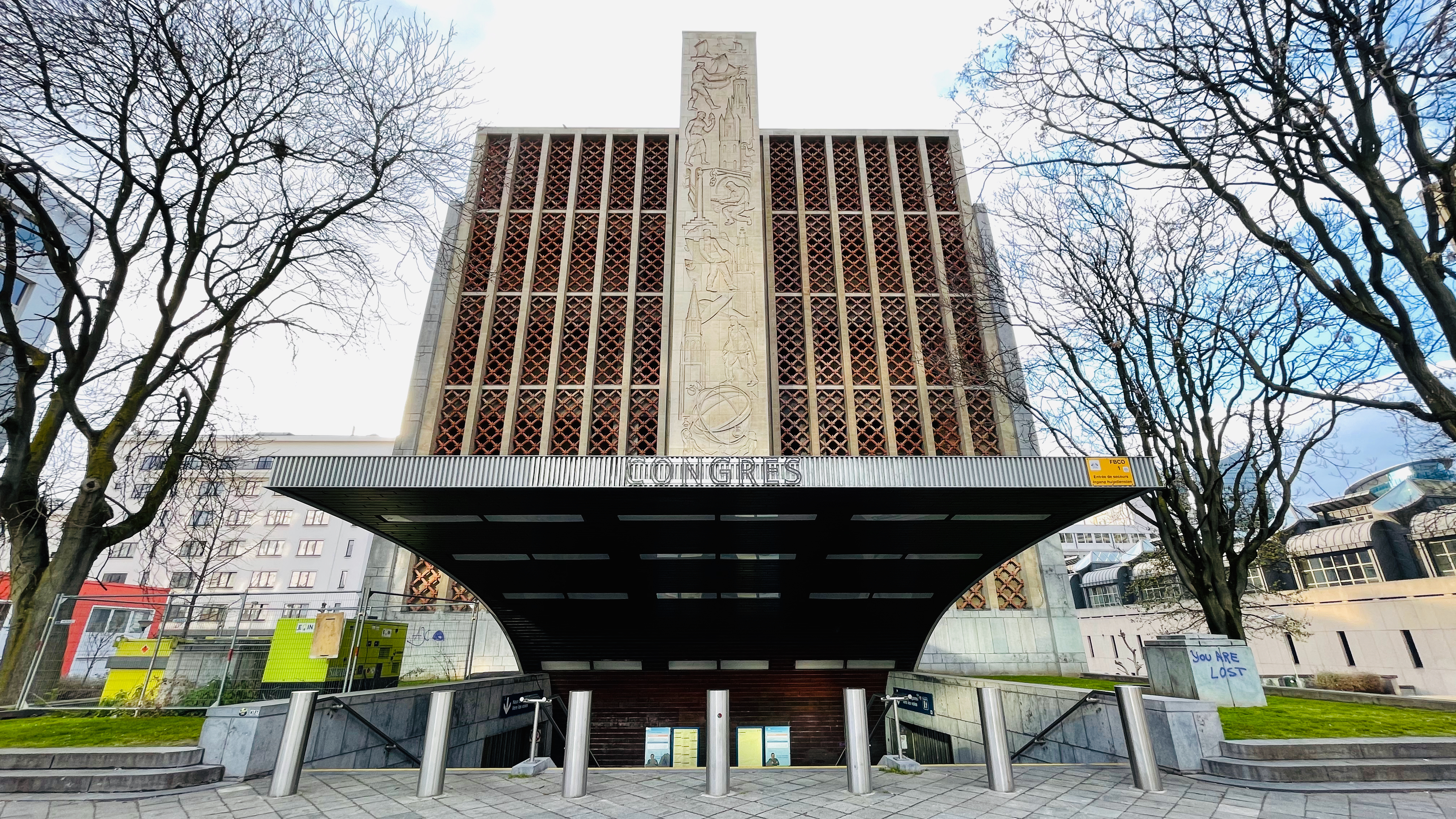

General information
- Location: Boulevard Pachéco / Pachecolaan 25; 1000 City of Brussels, Brussels-Capital Region; Belgium
- Coordinates: 50°51′8″N 4°21′43″E
- System: Railway Station
- Owner: SNCB/NMBS
- Operator: SNCB/NMBS
- Tracks: 4

History
- Opened: 4 October 1952; 73 years ago

Passengers
- 2010: 1,500/weekday

Services
Preceding station	NMBS/SNCB	Following station
Bruxelles-Nord / Brussel-Noord towards Antwerpen-Centraal	S 1	Brussels-Central towards Nivelles
Location
- Location within Belgium Location within Europe

Brussels-Congress railway station (French: Gare de Bruxelles-Congrès; Dutch: Station Brussel-Congres) (Note: Officially Brussels-Congress (French: Bruxelles-Congrès; Dutch: Brussel-Congres)) is a train stop on the North–South connection in the City of Brussels, Belgium. It is located at 25, boulevard Pachéco/Pachecolaan, near the State Administrative Centre. The train services are operated by the National Railway Company of Belgium (SNCB/NMBS).

Opened in 1952, it served as a railway station for 50 years. In 2002, the ticket offices closed and it was downgraded to a train stop. With only few passengers a day using Brussels-Congress, plans were being made to close it completely. However, up to now, none has been executed.

== History ==
=== Early history (1952–2002) ===
Brussels-Congress opened as a station in 1952, as part of the subterranean North–South connection. It served as a ventilation shaft for the connection, which was then still used by steam trains. 1958 saw the start of works to build the State Administrative Centre (French: Cité administrative de l'État or CAE, Dutch: Rijksadministratief Centrum or RAC), a complex in the International Style which was to accommodate all of the country's public administration. The construction took 27 years and the area, at its peak, could accommodate 14,000 civil servants. Consequently, the Congress Station became of significant importance for commuting workers. However, with the rise of workers commuting by car, and later on the abandonment of the CAE/RAC buildings, the station fell increasingly out of use.

=== Contemporary (2002–present) ===
Since April 2002, when the ticket offices closed, Brussels-Congress has only been in use as a train stop. In 2009, the National Railway Company of Belgium (SNCB/NMBS) counted 1,187 people boarding there every weekday. In 2010, this number was said to be 1,499. Even though the number of passengers increased, it remains very low. Because of this and the fact that several other transportation facilities are available in the vicinity, SNCB/NMBS is thinking of closing the train stop completely, this mainly to improve the time accuracy of the trains on the North–South connection. However, no final decision has yet been communicated.

== Architecture ==
The station building was designed by the modernist architect Maxime Brunfaut at the end of the 1940s. It consists mainly of an above-ground ventilation shaft for the underground North–South connection, which Brunfaut smartly used as the basis for his monumental design. The main design features are the stumpy tower and the large cantilevering shed over the entrance. The tower is five floors high and consists of a central bay sticking out of the front façade, housing the service stairs, and six bays to each side of this central one. The façade of the central bay is closed. The front façade of the other bays forms a rhombic net made from terracotta. This net is continued on the highest floor of the side façades. The lower floors of the side façades are closed. On both side façades bas-reliefs have been applied. The closed front façade of the central bay is also decorated with a bas-relief, made by the sculptor Jozef Cantré. The underground entrance is accentuated by the large cantilevering shed with the station's name written on its edge.

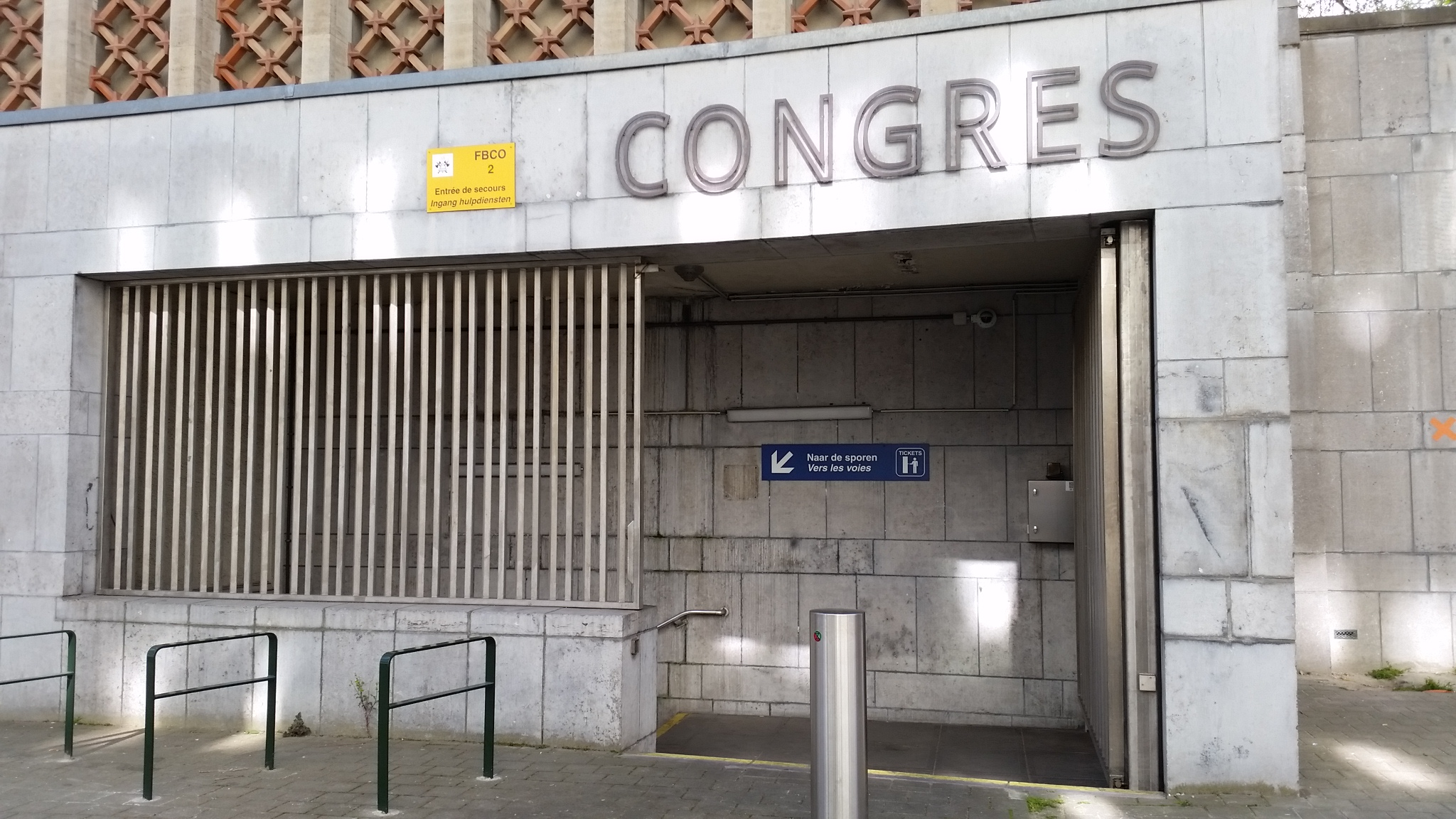
Security entrance

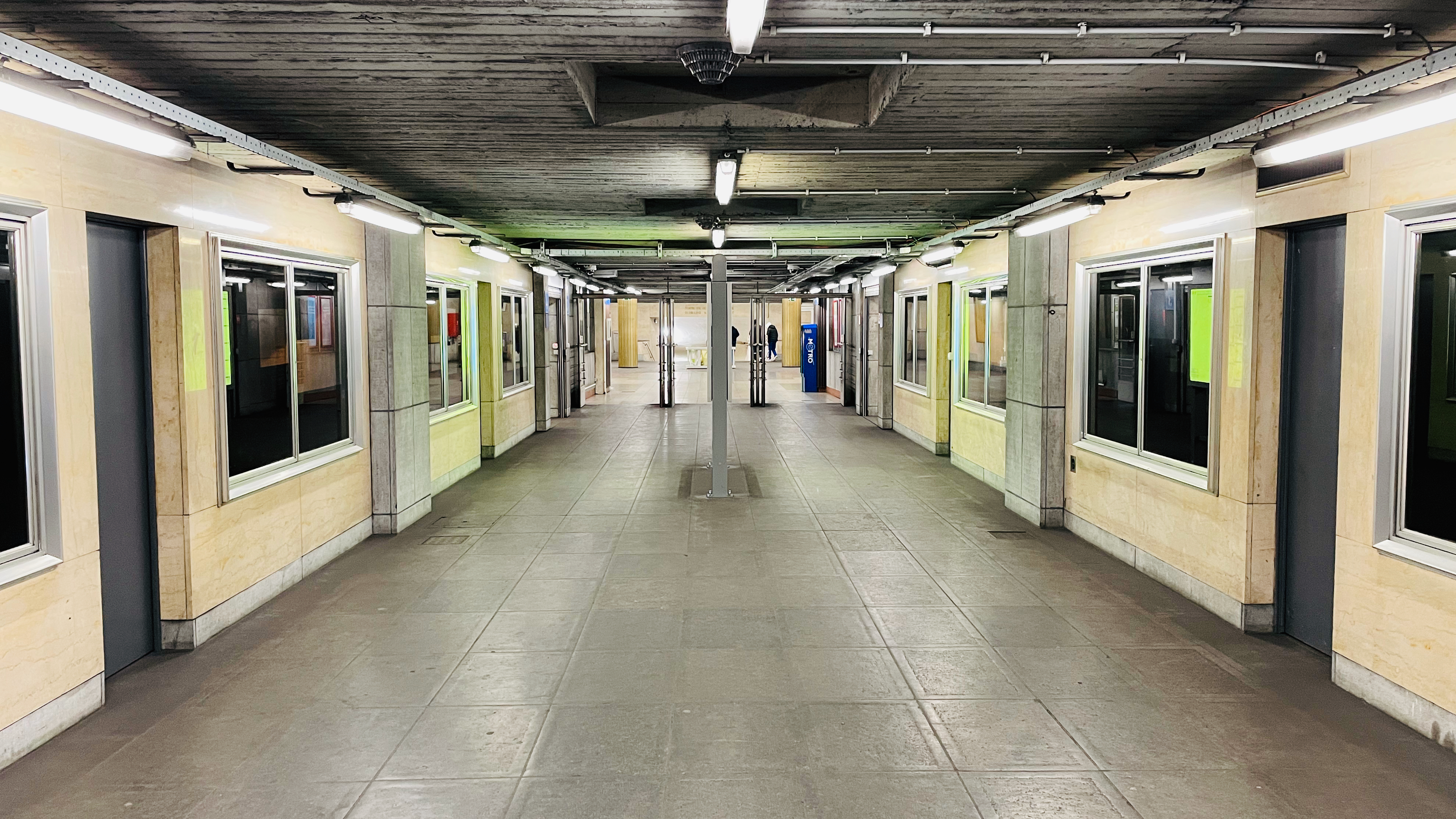
Corridor

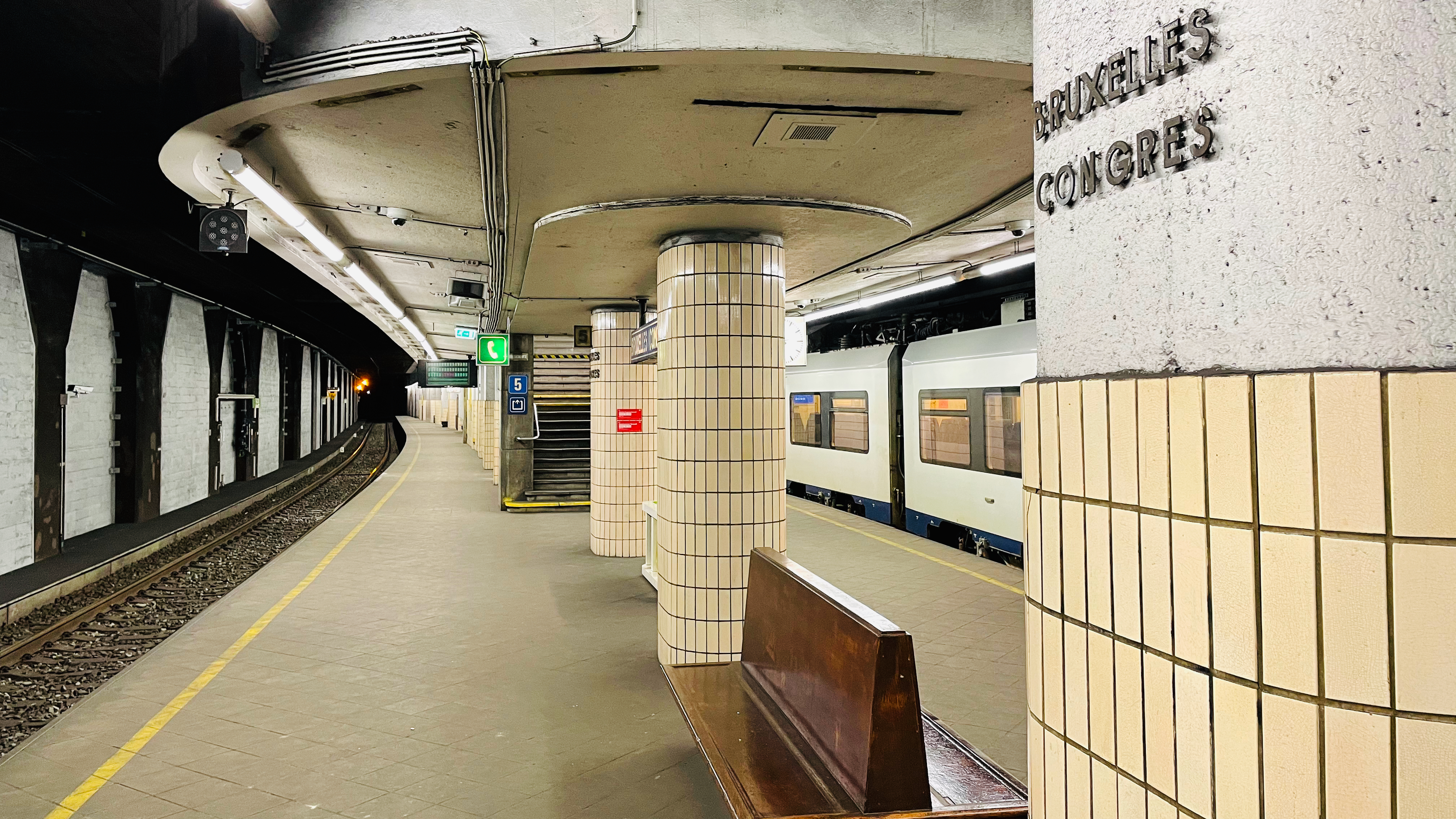
Platform

== Non-profit organisation Bruxelles-Congrès ==
In 2007, the non-profit organisation Bruxelles-Congrès was established by a group of eight enthusiastic volunteers. Their goal was to let the public become familiar again with the building by opening up rooms that were previously closed to the public and using them as exhibition spaces for different art forms. They organised different projects in the station building ranging from exhibitions to music concerts. Their last event was dated March 2012.

== Train services ==
Brussels-Congress has four platforms with numbers ranging from 3 to 6. Trains only stop at platform 5 and platform 6; the other two platforms being used by passing trains. Brussels-Congress is only used as a stop on weekdays during the day. The first train departs at 6.22 a.m. and the last train leaves the train stop at 6.49 p.m. During morning rush hour, a maximum of four trains per hour stop in the direction of Brussels Central Station and five trains in the direction of Brussels-North railway station. During evening rush hour, five trains stop per hour in the direction of Brussels-Central and only three in the direction of Brussels-North. During the rest of the day, only two trains in each direction stop there per hour.

The station is served by the following service(s):

- Brussels RER services (S1) Antwerp - Mechelen - Brussels - Waterloo - Nivelles (weekdays)

== See also ==
- List of railway stations in Belgium
- Rail transport in Belgium
- Transport in Brussels
- History of Brussels
