= Gare Centrale metro station =

Metro station in Brussels, Belgium

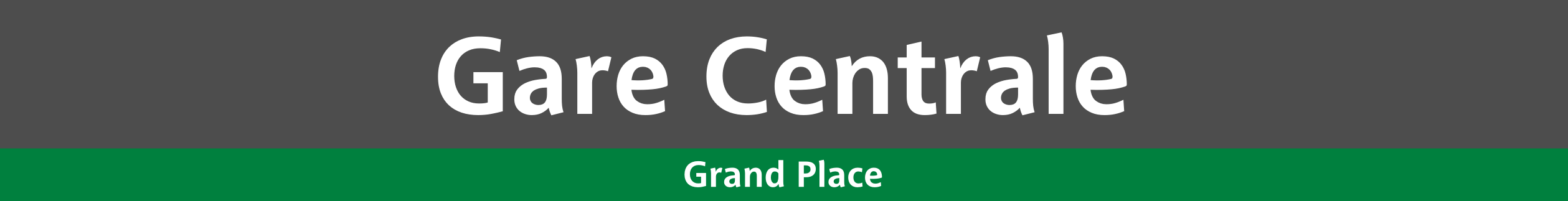
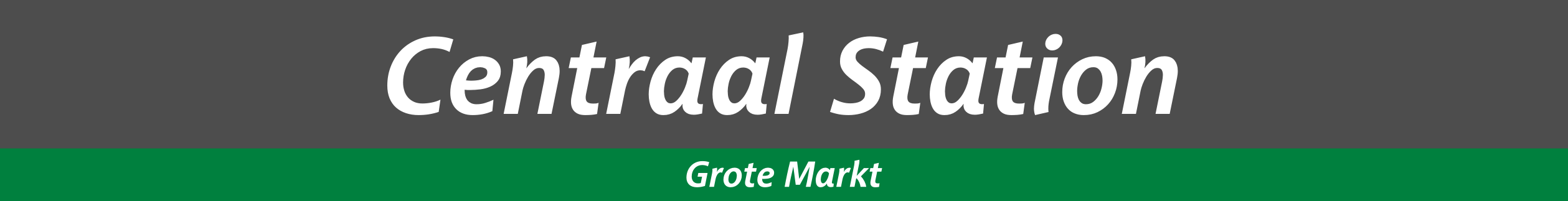

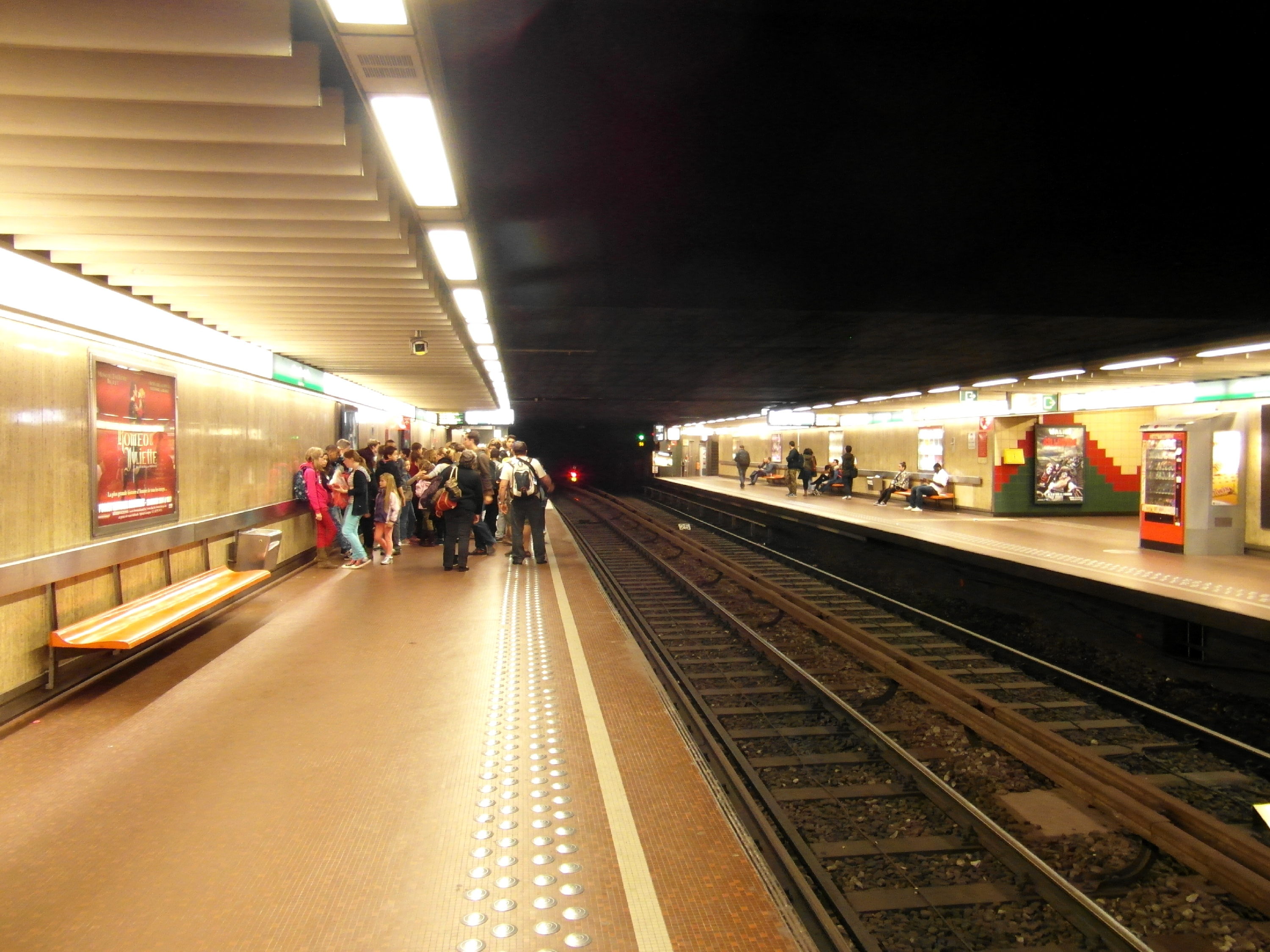
- Gare Centrale/Centraal Station metro station

General information
- Location: Carrefour de l'Europe / Europakruispunt 2; 1000 City of Brussels, Brussels-Capital Region, Belgium
- Coordinates: 50°50′47.4″N 4°21′31.3″E
- Owner: STIB/MIVB
- Platforms: 2
- Tracks: 2

Construction
- Structure type: Underground
- Accessible: Yes

History
- Opened: 17 December 1969; 56 years ago (premetro); 20 September 1976; 50 years ago (metro)

Services
Preceding station	Brussels Metro	Following station
De Brouckère towards Gare de l'Ouest/Weststation	Line 1	Park towards Stockel/Stokkel
De Brouckère towards Erasme/Erasmus	Line 5	Park towards Herrmann-Debroux
Location

Gare Centrale (French) or Centraal Station (Dutch) is a Brussels Metro station on lines 1 and 5. It is located five minutes' walk from Brussels-Central railway station, under the Marché au Bois/Houtmarkt, in the City of Brussels, Belgium, and can be accessed through a pedestrian tunnel.

The station opened on 17 December 1969 as a premetro (underground tram) station on the tram line between De Brouckère and Schuman. This station was upgraded to full metro status on 20 September 1976, serving former east–west line 1 (further split in 1982 into former lines 1A and 1B). Then, following the reorganisation of the Brussels Metro on 4 April 2009, it now lies on the joint section of east–west lines 1 and 5.

== History ==
Gare Centrale/Centraal Station station was inaugurated on 17 December 1969 as a premetro station (i.e. a station served by underground tramways), as part of the first underground public transport route in Belgium, which initially stretched from De Brouckère to Schuman. On 20 September 1976, this premetro line was converted into a heavy metro line, which was later split into two distinct lines on 6 October 1982: former lines 1A and 1B, both serving Gare Centrale/Centraal Station. On 4 April 2009, metro operation was restructured and the station is now served by metro lines 1 and 5.

== See also ==
- Transport in Brussels
- History of Brussels
