= Brussels-Central railway station =

Railway and metro station in Brussels, Belgium

Brussels-Central
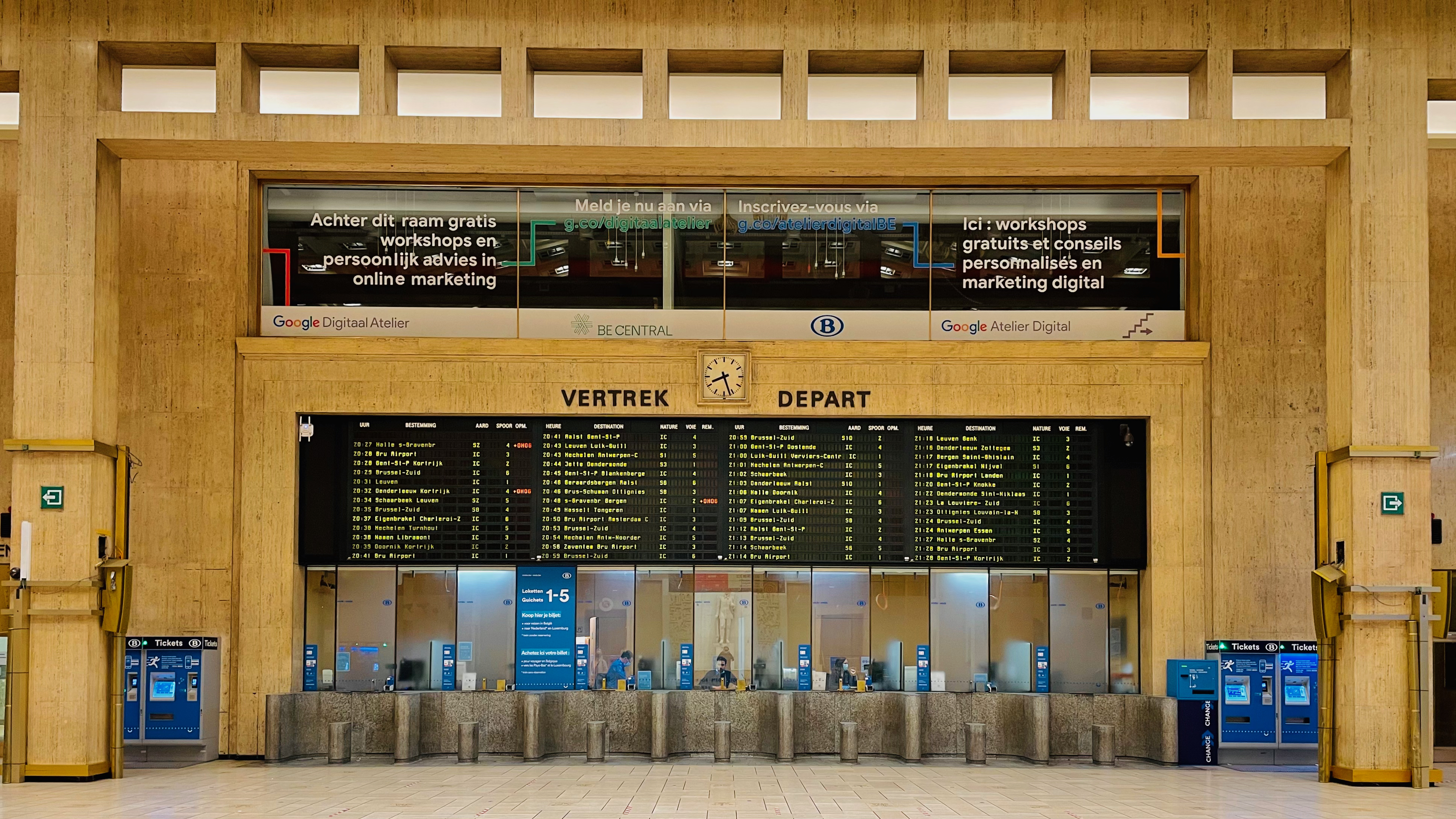
- Main hall of Brussels-Central railway station

General information
- Location: Carrefour de l'Europe / Europakruispunt 2; 1000 City of Brussels, Brussels-Capital Region; Belgium
- Coordinates: 50°50′44″N 4°21′25″E
- System: Railway Station
- Owner: SNCB/NMBS
- Operator: SNCB/NMBS
- Line: North–South connection
- Platforms: 3 (island)
- Tracks: 6
- Connections: Brussels Metro: 1 5 (at metro station)

Construction
- Architect: Victor Horta, Maxime Brunfaut
- Architectural style: Modernism

Other information
- Station code: FBCL
- Website: Official website

History
- Opened: 4 October 1952; 73 years ago
Location
- Location within Belgium Location within Europe

Brussels-Central railway station (French: Gare de Bruxelles-Central; Dutch: Station Brussel-Centraal) (Note: Officially Brussels-Central (French: Bruxelles-Central; Dutch: Brussel-Centraal)) is a railway and metro station in central Brussels, Belgium. It is the second busiest railway station in Belgium and one of three principal railway stations in Brussels, together with Brussels-South and Brussels-North. First completed in 1952 after protracted delays caused by economic difficulties and World War II, it is the newest of Brussels' main rail hubs. The train services are operated by the National Railway Company of Belgium (SNCB/NMBS).

Brussels-Central is connected to the rapid transit station Gare Centrale/Centraal Station on lines 1 and 5 of the Brussels Metro system, and serves as an important node of the Brussels Intercommunal Transport Company (STIB/MIVB).

== History ==
=== Inception and construction ===
During the late 19th and early 20th centuries, Brussels-North and Brussels-South were the primary railway stations in Brussels (Brussels-North slowly supplanted the original Allée Verte/Groendreef railway station near the same site). However, they were joined only by an inadequate single track running along what is today the Small Ring (Brussels' inner ring road). Many proposals were put forward to link the two stations more substantially. A law was finally passed in 1909 mandating a direct connection; however, the final project would not be completed until nearly half a century later.

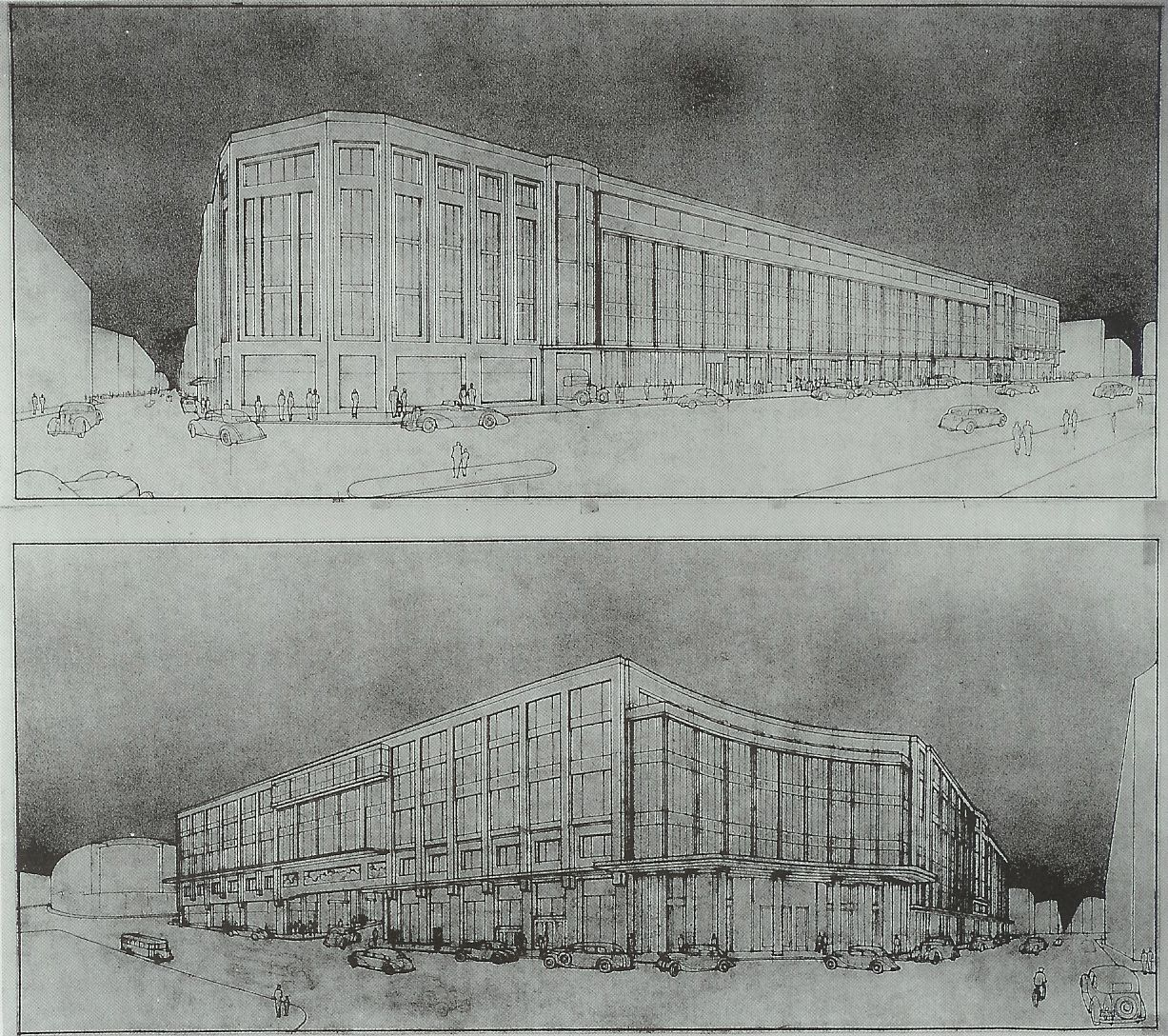
Draft of Brussels-Central railway station by Victor Horta

The famed architect Victor Horta was awarded the design of the Central Station building complex in 1910. He finished the initial version in 1912. Plans for the station originally featured a major urban redevelopment project, for which land was purchased and over 1,000 buildings demolished in the 1920s. The Putterie/Putterij district began to be razed to make way for the underground station and building complex. However, work was halted by World War I. Financial constraints limited work after the war, and in 1927, the Belgian government suspended the project altogether. In 1935, a new office dedicated to the project was set up and work resumed. The Central Station was planned as a hub in the connection. However, World War II slowed construction again. The interruptions and delays to construction left large areas filled with debris and craters for decades.

Horta returned to work on the station after the end of the war. Following his death, in 1947, an architectural team led by Maxime Brunfaut, son of the architect Fernand Brunfaut, president of the National Bureau of the North–South connection, was entrusted with the station's construction. The building was completed according to Horta's plans by Brunfaut, who expanded them by adding a new train line to Brussels Airport, in the suburb of Zaventem, as well as several underground passageways for pedestrians. The station was finally inaugurated on 4 October 1952. Two memorial plaques in the station's main hall commemorate the opening. On the left-hand side of the second plaque is a medallion bearing Fernand Brunfaut's image.

=== 21st century ===
The Central Station was renovated between 2004 and 2010 in an attempt to better equip it to present levels of usage (which can reach 150,000 passengers/day on the busiest days). Two new entrances were created on that occasion, and the main entrance was extensively renovated. The Carrefour de l'Europe/Europakruispunt, a pedestrianised square, was created in front of the station. Plans then came for the renovation of the tunnel which links the main station with the metro stop. It has been described as dilapidated, dirty, and permanently tinged by the smell of urine. An architectural firm had been retained in 2010 to implement the project designed to make the hallway a better "window" to Brussels for the many travellers who begin their journey there. The new tunnel with hops and a more luminous, graffiti resistant environment were completed in 2013.

An Islamic jihadist attempted to detonate a suitcase bomb in the Central Station in the failed June 2017 Brussels attack; there were no casualties. The attacker was subsequently shot and killed by one of the soldiers who were patrolling the station at the time.

Between 2018 and 2019, the North–South connection's tunnel was renovated to improve ventilation and smoke extraction in the event of a fire. The six-lane underground tunnel, separated by the pillars supporting the vault, was transformed into a tunnel with three openings separated by walls provided with fire doors at regular intervals (an operation carried out by walling the openings between the pillars). The ends of the platforms of the Central Station were also affected.

== Features ==
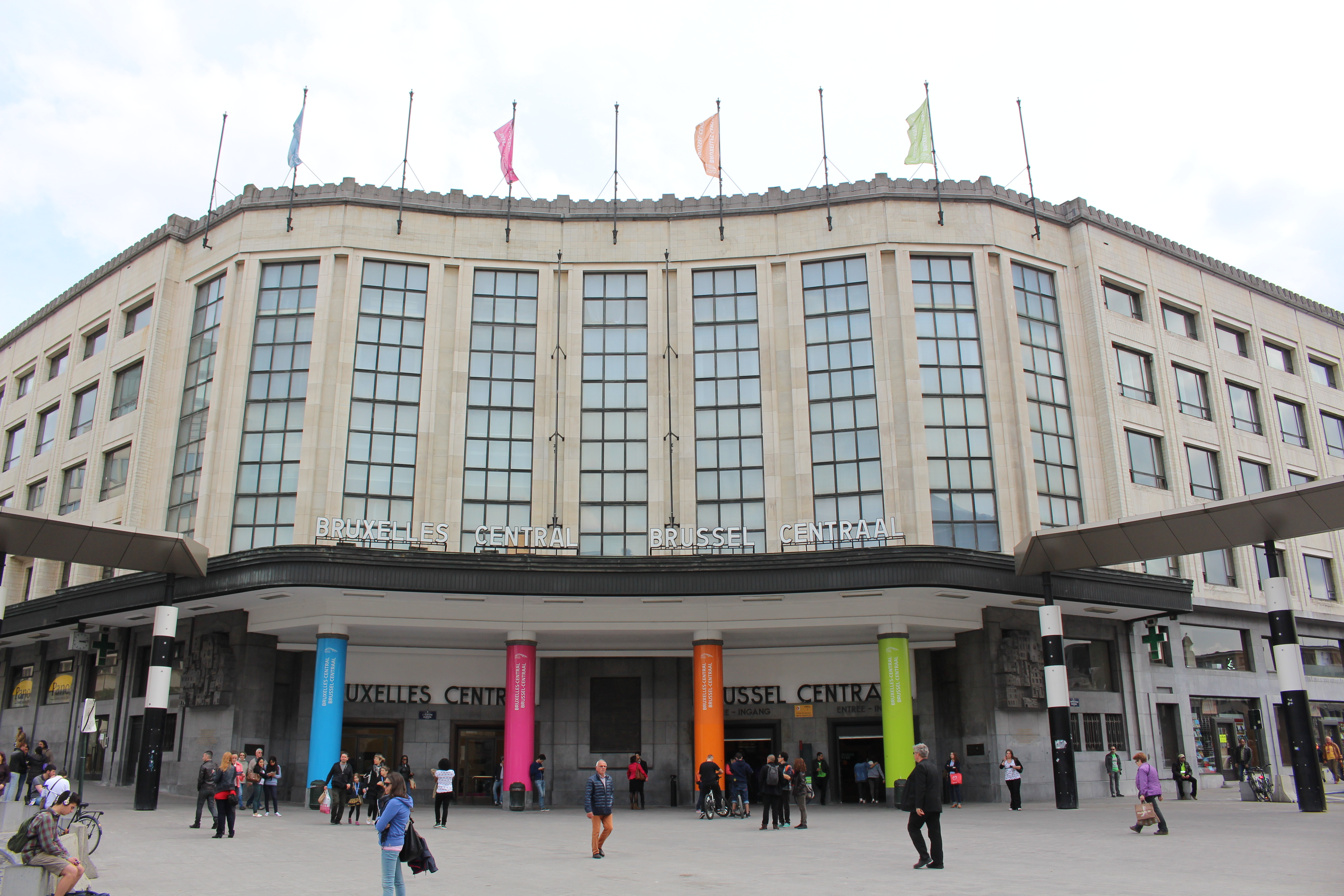
Entrance to Brussels-Central

Brussels Central Station has six tracks, served by three island platforms. These are underground, beneath the city blocks within the Boulevard de l'Impératrice/Keizerinlaan, the Rue de l'Infante Isabelle/Infante Isabellastraat, the Cantersteen/Kantersteen and the Rue de la Putterie/Putterijstraat. The main entrance and ticket office are at ground level on the Boulevard de l'Impératrice, and there are several other entrances on the other streets. An SNCB/NMBS station, its main hall is equipped with ticket machines. Facilities, equipment and services are also available for persons with reduced mobility.

Although the railway station is at the very heart of the city, its capacity is not adapted to present usage levels (c. 70,000 passengers on a weekday), let alone future ones. The interior and the platforms have been renovated in recent years, but the main problem (i.e. lack of capacity) has not fundamentally been addressed. There have been suggestions to expand the station, but none of them has gained widespread acceptance. Today, at peak times, about 96 trains an hour use the station's six platforms. With passenger growth expected to average 4% per year in the coming decade, Infrabel, the administrator of the Belgian rail network, has determined that an expansion of the rail capacity and of the station will be necessary. The CEO of Infrabel has estimated the cost of an adequate expansion at least €1 billion. However, the task of getting all relevant authorities to agree on a plan has so far proved difficult. Some credit a general taboo against discussions of expanding the North–South connection as a result of the history of extended delays and widespread destruction of neighbourhood blocks that the initial construction brought between 1911 and 1952.

== Train services ==
The station is served by the following services:

- Intercity services (IC 01) Ostend - Bruges - Gent - Brussels - Leuven - Liege - Welkenraedt - Eupen
- Intercity services (IC 03) Knokke/Blankenberge - Bruges - Gent - Brussels - Leuven - Hasselt - Genk
- Intercity services (IC 05) Antwerp - Mechelen - Brussels - Nivelles - Charleroi (weekdays)
- Intercity services (IC 06) Tournai - Ath - Halle - Brussels - Brussels Airport
- Intercity services (IC 06A) Mons - Braine-le-Comte - Brussels - Brussels Airport
- Intercity services (IC-11) Binche - Braine-le-Comte - Halle - Brussels - Mechelen - Turnhout (weekdays)
- Intercity services (IC 12) Kortrijk - Gent - Brussels - Leuven - Liege - Welkenraedt (weekdays)
- Intercity services (IC 14) Quiévrain - Mons - Braine-le-Comte - Brussels - Leuven - Liege (weekdays)
- Intercity services (IC 16) Brussels - Namur - Arlon - Luxembourg
- Intercity services (IC 17) Brussels - Namur - Dinant (weekends)
- Intercity services (IC 18) Brussels - Namur - Liege (weekdays)
- Intercity services (IC 20) Gent - Aalst - Brussels - Hasselt - Tongeren (weekdays)
- Intercity services (IC 20) Gent - Aalst - Brussels - Dendermonde - Lokeren (weekends)
- Intercity services (IC 22) Essen - Antwerp - Mechelen - Brussels (weekdays)
- Intercity services (IC 22) Antwerp - Mechelen - Brussels - Halle - Braine-le-Comte - Binche (weekends)
- Intercity services (IC 23) Ostend - Bruges - Kortrijk - Zottegem - Brussels - Brussels Airport
- Intercity services (IC 23A) Bruges - Gent - Brussels - Brussels Airport (weekdays)
- Intercity services (IC 23A) Gent - Brussels - Brussels Airport (weekends)
- Intercity services (IC 26) Kortrijk - Tournai - Halle - Brussels - Dendermonde - Lokeren - Sint Niklaas (weekdays)
- Intercity services (IC 29) De Panne - Gent - Aalst - Brussels - Brussels Airport - Leuven - Landen
- Intercity services (IC 31) Antwerp - Mechelen - Brussels (weekdays)
- Intercity services (IC 31) Antwerp - Mechelen - Brussels - Nivelles - Charleroi (weekends)
- Intercity services (IC 35) Amsterdam - The Hague - Rotterdam - Roosendaal - Antwerp - Brussels Airport - Brussels
- Regional services (S1) Antwerp - Mechelen - Brussels - Waterloo - Nivelles (weekdays)
- Regional services (S1) Antwerp - Mechelen - Brussels (weekends)
- Regional services (S1) Brussels - Waterloo - Nivelles (weekends)
- Regional services (S2) Leuven - Brussels - Halle - Braine-le-Comte
- Regional services (S3) Dendermonde - Brussels - Denderleeuw - Zottegem - Oudenaarde (weekdays)
- Regional services (S6) Aalst - Denderleeuw - Geraardsbergen - Halle - Brussels - Schaarbeek
- Regional services (S8) Brussels - Etterbeek - Ottignies - Louvain-le-Neuve
- Regional services (S10) Dendermonde - Brussels - Denderleeuw - Aalst

The station is also served by many P-Trains operating only during peak hours as well as on Sunday evenings.

| Preceding station | NS International | Following station |
|---|---|---|
| Brussels-North towards Amsterdam Centraal | Eurocity 9200 | Brussels-South Terminus |
| Preceding station | NMBS/SNCB | Following station |
| Bruxelles-Midi / Brussel-Zuid Terminus | IC 16 | Bruxelles-Nord / Brussel-Noord towards Luxembourg |
| Bruxelles-Midi / Brussel-Zuid towards Oostende | IC 01 | Bruxelles-Nord / Brussel-Noord towards Eupen |
| Bruxelles-Midi / Brussel-Zuid towards Blankenberge or Knokke | IC 03 | Bruxelles-Nord / Brussel-Noord towards Genk |
| Bruxelles-Nord / Brussel-Noord towards Antwerpen-Centraal | IC 05 weekdays | Bruxelles-Midi / Brussel-Zuid towards Charleroi-Sud |
| Bruxelles-Midi / Brussel-Zuid towards Tournai | IC 06 | Bruxelles-Nord / Brussel-Noord towards Brussels National Airport |
| Bruxelles-Midi / Brussel-Zuid towards Mons | IC 06A | Bruxelles-Nord / Brussel-Noord towards Brussels National Airport |
| Bruxelles-Midi / Brussel-Zuid towards Binche | IC 11 weekdays | Bruxelles-Nord / Brussel-Noord towards Turnhout |
| Bruxelles-Midi / Brussel-Zuid towards Kortrijk | IC 12 weekdays | Bruxelles-Nord / Brussel-Noord towards Welkenraedt |
| Bruxelles-Midi / Brussel-Zuid towards Quiévrain | IC 14 weekdays | Bruxelles-Nord / Brussel-Noord towards Liège-Guillemins |
| Bruxelles-Midi / Brussel-Zuid Terminus | IC 17 weekends | Bruxelles-Nord / Brussel-Noord towards Dinant |
| Bruxelles-Midi / Brussel-Zuid Terminus | IC 18 weekdays | Bruxelles-Nord / Brussel-Noord towards Liège-Saint-Lambert |
| Bruxelles-Midi / Brussel-Zuid towards Gent-Sint-Pieters | IC 20 weekdays, except holidays | Bruxelles-Nord / Brussel-Noord towards Tongeren |
| Bruxelles-Midi / Brussel-Zuid towards Gent-Sint-Pieters | IC 20 weekends | Bruxelles-Nord / Brussel-Noord towards Lokeren |
| Bruxelles-Nord / Brussel-Noord towards Essen | IC 22 weekdays, except holidays | Bruxelles-Midi / Brussel-Zuid Terminus |
| Bruxelles-Nord / Brussel-Noord towards Antwerpen-Centraal | IC 22 weekends | Bruxelles-Midi / Brussel-Zuid towards Binche |
| Bruxelles-Midi / Brussel-Zuid towards Oostende | IC 23 | Bruxelles-Nord / Brussel-Noord towards Brussels National Airport |
| Bruxelles-Midi / Brussel-Zuid towards Brugge | IC 23A | Bruxelles-Nord / Brussel-Noord towards Brussels National Airport |
| Bruxelles-Midi / Brussel-Zuid towards Kortrijk | IC 26 weekdays | Bruxelles-Nord / Brussel-Noord towards Sint-Niklaas |
| Bruxelles-Midi / Brussel-Zuid towards De Panne | IC 29 | Bruxelles-Nord / Brussel-Noord towards Landen |
| Bruxelles-Nord / Brussel-Noord towards Antwerpen-Centraal | IC 31 weekdays, except holidays | Bruxelles-Midi / Brussel-Zuid Terminus |
| Bruxelles-Nord / Brussel-Noord towards Antwerpen-Centraal | IC 31 weekends | Bruxelles-Midi / Brussel-Zuid towards Charleroi-Sud |
| Brussels-Congress towards Antwerpen-Centraal | S 1 weekdays | Brussels-Chapel towards Nivelles |
| Bruxelles-Nord / Brussel-Noord Terminus | S 1 weekends | Brussels-Chapel towards Nivelles |
| Bruxelles-Nord / Brussel-Noord towards Antwerpen-Centraal | S 1 weekends | Bruxelles-Midi / Brussel-Zuid Terminus |
| Bruxelles-Nord / Brussel-Noord towards Leuven | S 2 | Bruxelles-Midi / Brussel-Zuid towards Braine-le-Comte |
| Bruxelles-Nord / Brussel-Noord towards Dendermonde | S 3 weekdays | Bruxelles-Midi / Brussel-Zuid towards Oudenaarde |
| Bruxelles-Nord / Brussel-Noord towards Schaarbeek | S 6 | Bruxelles-Midi / Brussel-Zuid towards Aalst |
| Bruxelles-Nord / Brussel-Noord towards Louvain-la-Neuve | S 8 | Bruxelles-Midi / Brussel-Zuid Terminus |
| Bruxelles-Nord / Brussel-Noord towards Aalst | S 10 | Bruxelles-Midi / Brussel-Zuid towards Dendermonde |

== Gallery ==
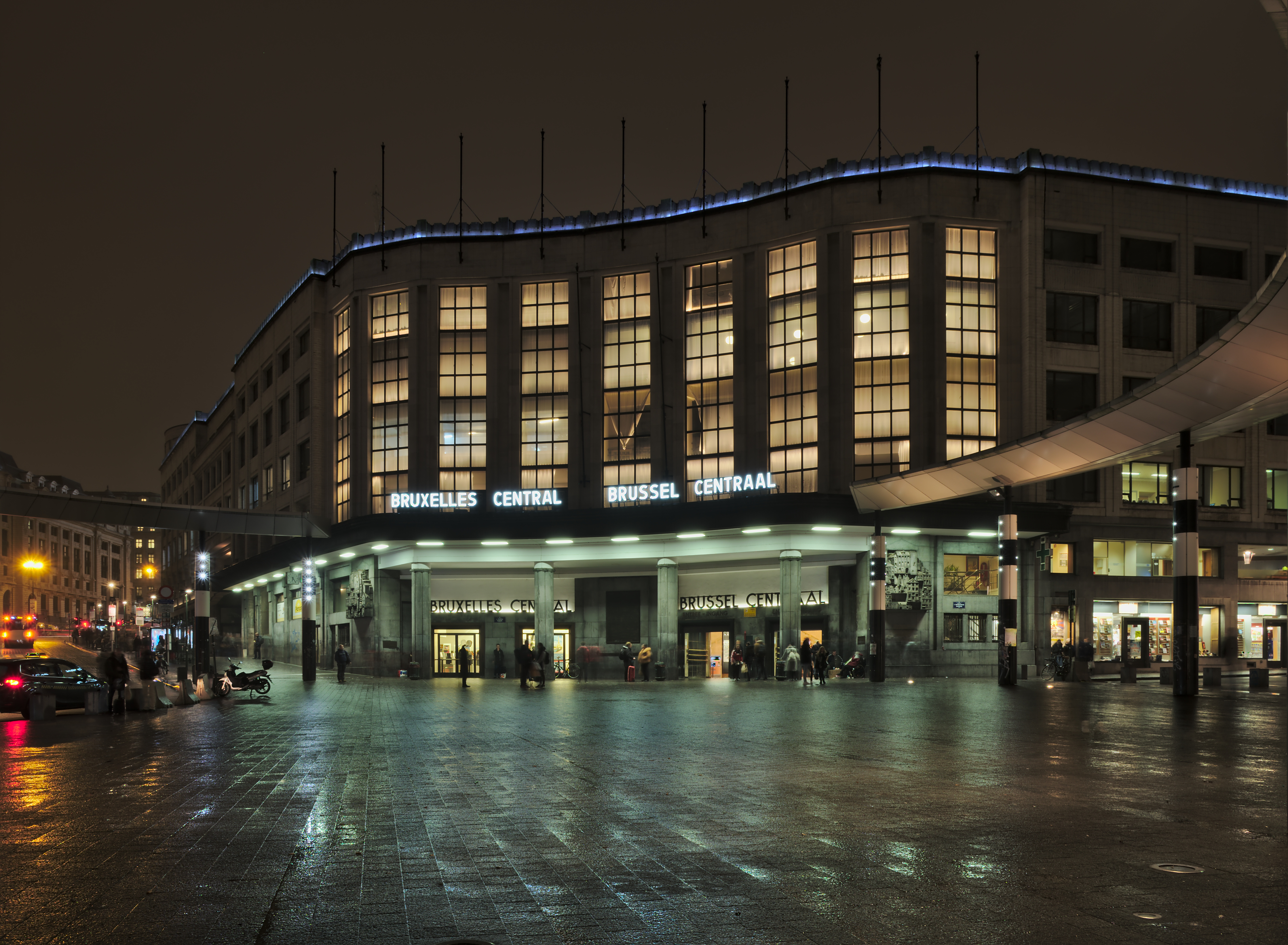
Front side of the Central Station on the Carrefour de l'Europe/Europakruispunt

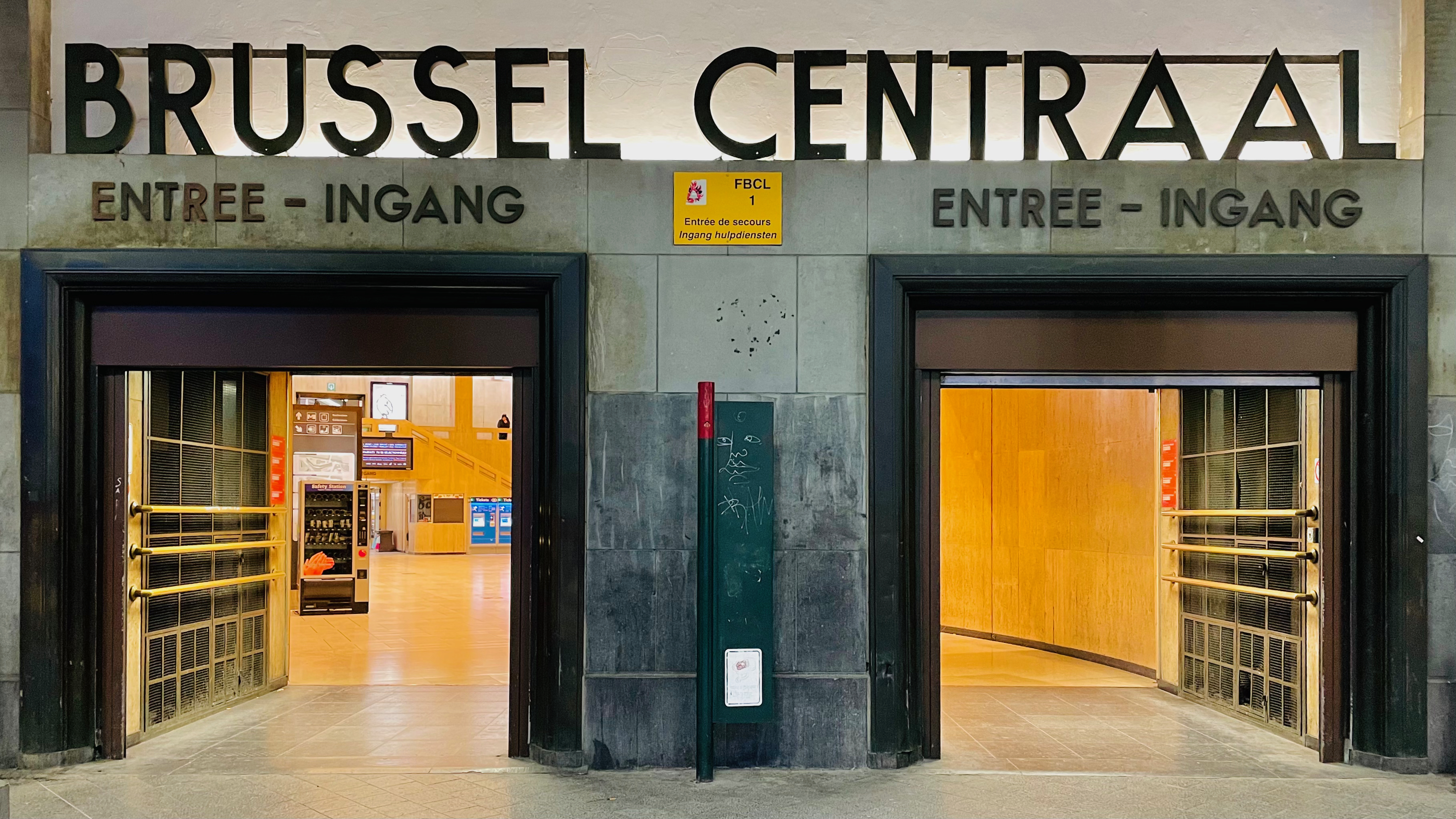
Exterior (main) entrance from the Carrefour de l'Europe

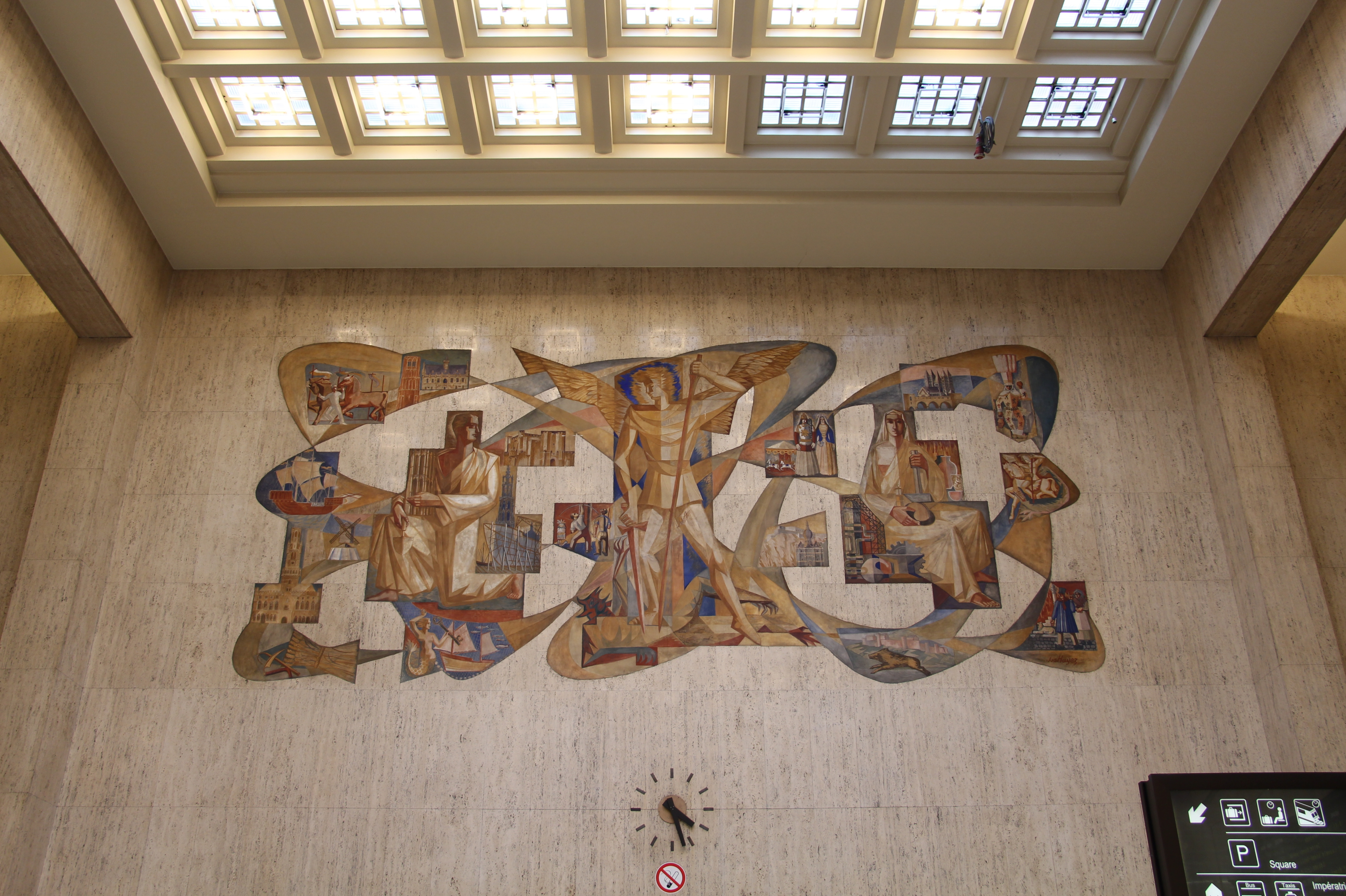
Interior mural in the station's main hall

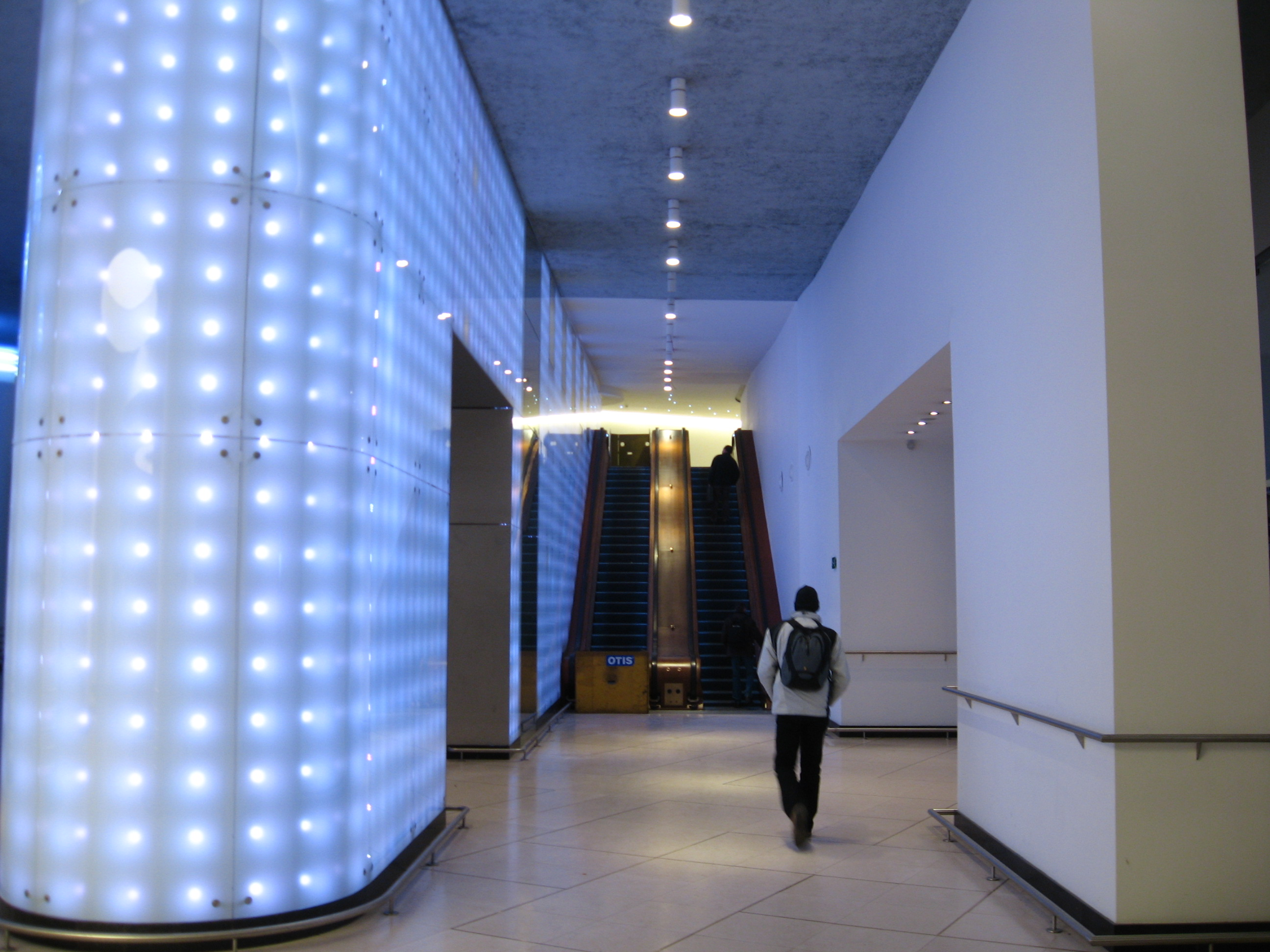
Interior entrance from the Horta Gallery

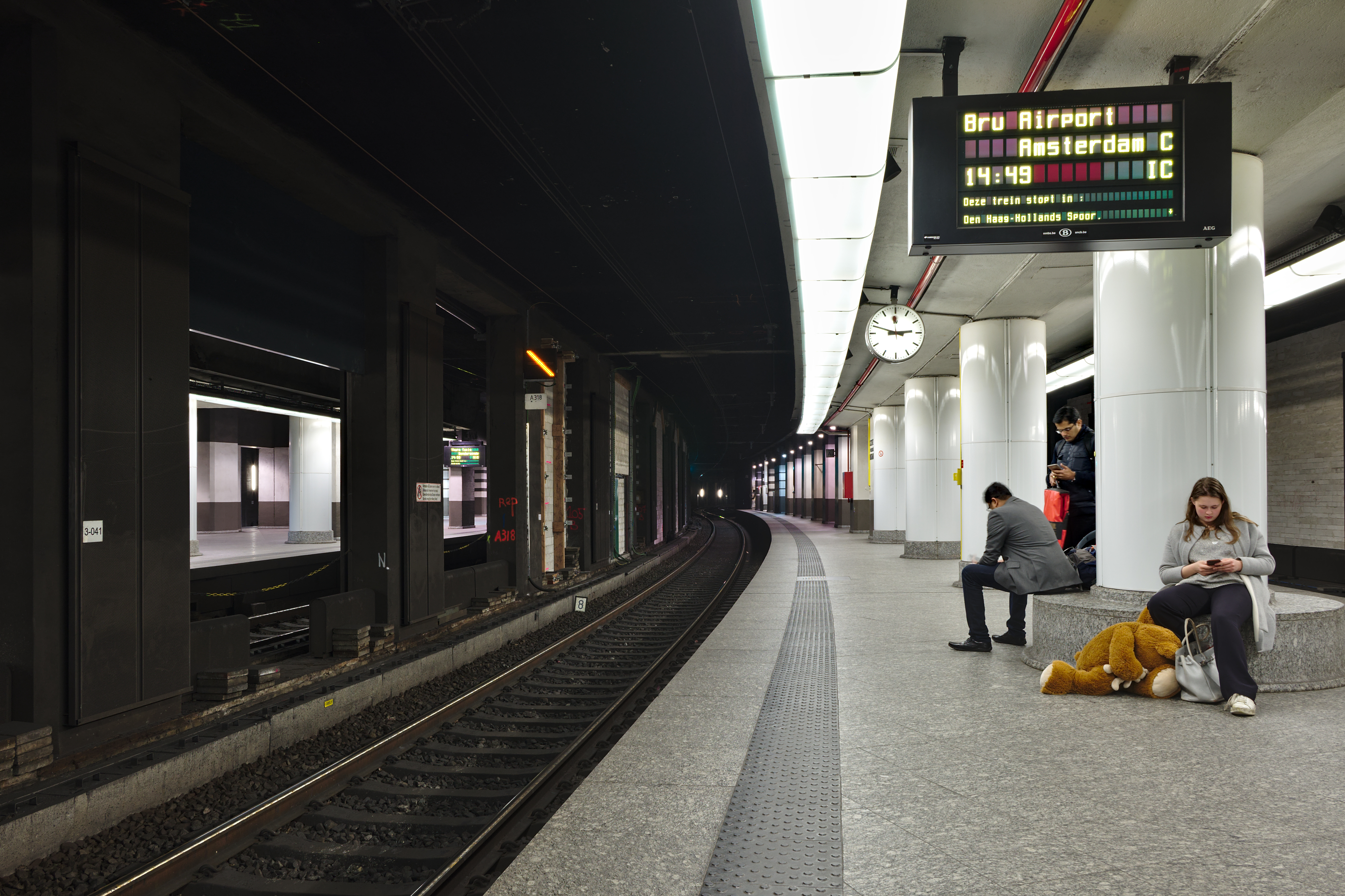
Platform 3

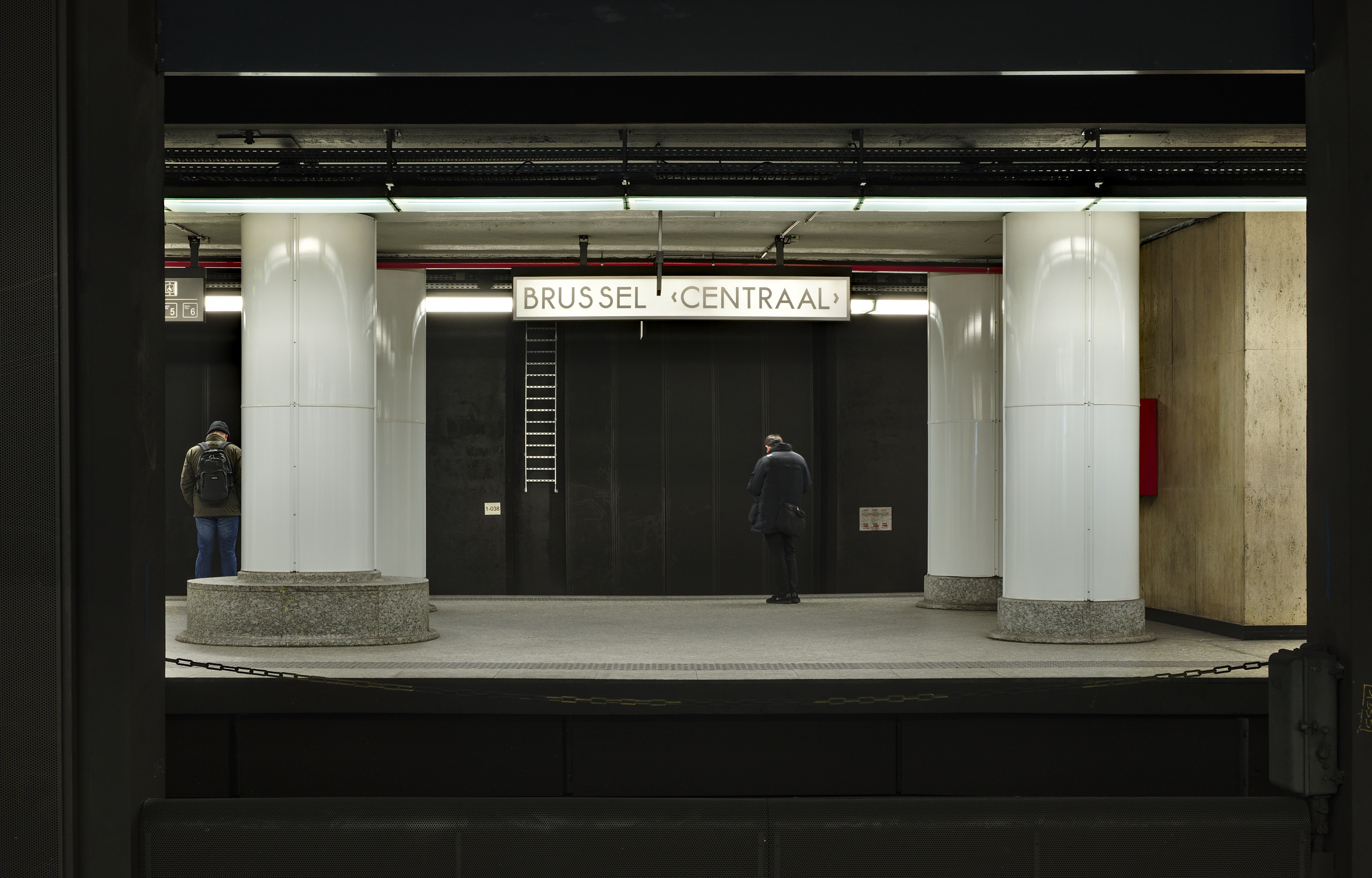
Sign seen from platform 3

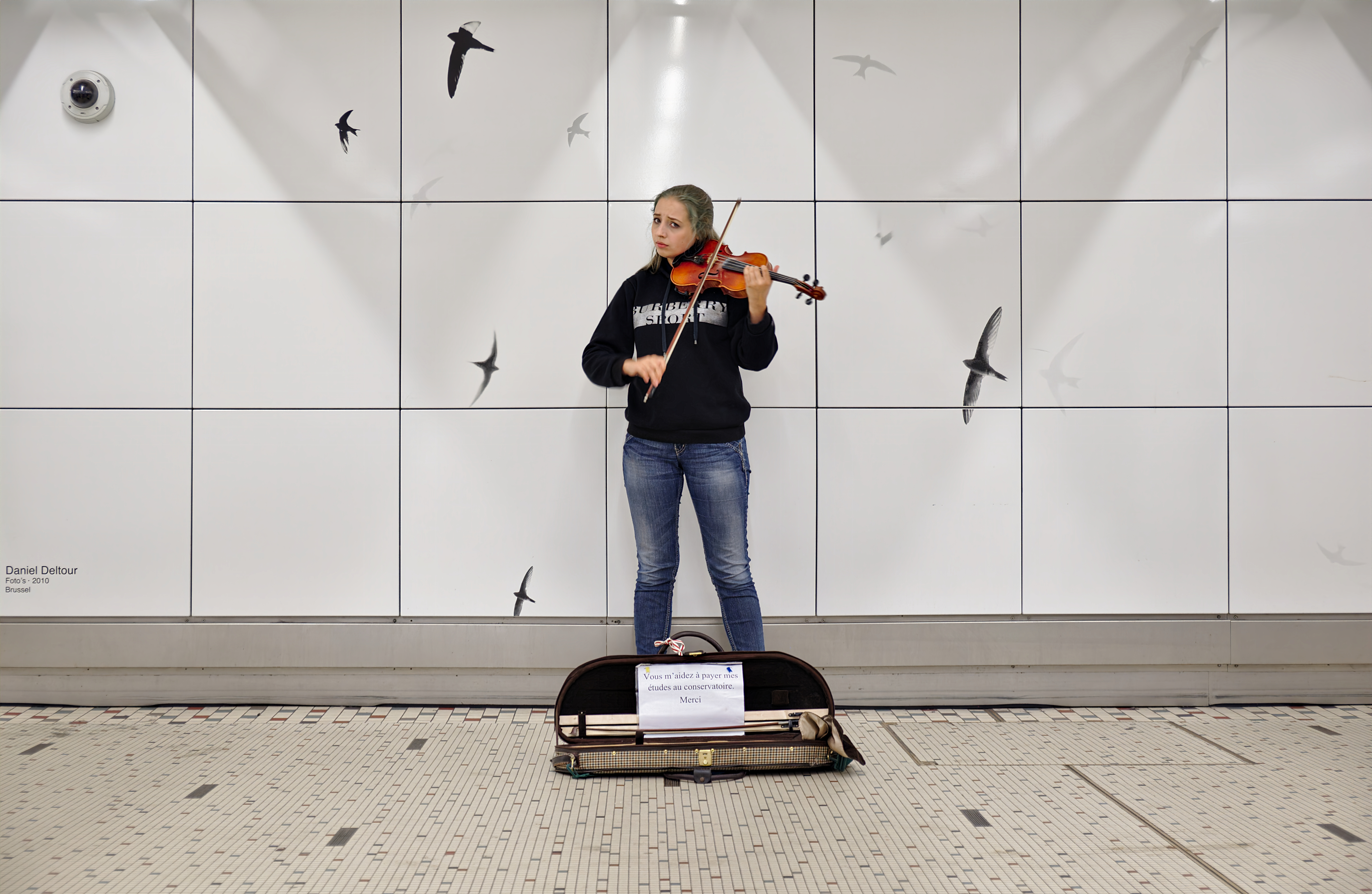
Violinist in the hallway connecting the station's train and metro portions

== Metro station ==
The metro station, called Gare Centrale/Centraal Station, is located five minutes' walk from the railway station, under the Marché au bois/Houtmarkt, and can be accessed through a pedestrian tunnel. It first opened as a premetro (underground tram) station on 17 December 1969 on the tram line between De Brouckère and Schuman. This premetro line was upgraded to full metro status on 20 September 1976. Then, following the reorganisation of the Brussels Metro on 4 April 2009, it now lies on the joint section of metro lines 1 and 5, which cross Brussels from east to west.

== See also ==
- List of railway stations in Belgium
- Rail transport in Belgium
- Transport in Brussels
- Art Deco in Brussels
- History of Brussels
- Joe Van Holsbeeck
