= North–South connection =

Railway link through central Brussels, Belgium

Coordinates: 50.8473°N 4.3589°E

Brussels North–South connection
- The North–South connection (bold black) in relation to other Brussels railway and metro lines

Overview
- Status: Operational
- Locale: Belgium
- Termini: Brussels-North railway station; Brussels-South railway station

Service
- Operator(s): SNCB/NMBS

History
- Opened: 1952

Technical
- Line length: 3.8 km (2.4 mi)
- Number of tracks: six tracks
- Track gauge: 1,435 mm (4 ft 8 1/2 in) standard gauge
- Electrification: 3 kV DC

The North–South connection (French: Jonction Nord-Midi; Dutch: Noord-Zuidverbinding) is a railway link of national and international importance through central Brussels, Belgium, that connects the major railway stations in the city. It is line 0 (zero) of the Belgian rail network. With 1200 trains a day, it is the busiest railway line in Belgium and the busiest railway tunnel in the world. It has six tracks and is used for passenger trains, or rarely for a maintenance train when work is to be done on the railway infrastructure inside the North–South connection itself, but not for freight trains. It is partially underground (around Brussels-Central railway station) and partially raised above street level.

== History ==
During the late 19th and early 20th centuries, Brussels was served by two main railway stations: Brussels-North (opened in 1846) and Brussels-South (opened in 1869, replacing a nearby station of 1840). They are located just outside opposite ends of the Pentagon—an area within the ring roads which follow the boundary of the old city walls. Shortly after opening, both stations were handling large volumes of commuter, regional and international passengers, but through journeys required disembarking and a street-level transfer through the city's old town, a distance of over 3 km (1.9 mi).

The idea of an underground railway line linking the two stations was first suggested in the 1860s, as part of a proposal for the covering of the Senne, although it was never implemented. The current version was planned before World War II, after a decision originally made in 1909, and it came into service on 5 October 1952. Both stations were demolished and reconstructed to allow through services, reopening in 1952.

Three new intermediate stations were constructed along the route to serve the city centre. Two of them, Brussels-Chapel and Brussels-Congress, were intended stops only for local commuter services and have never been heavily used. The largest of the new stations, Brussels-Central, was built to additionally serve regional and international services transiting through Brussels. The combination of a city-centre location and numerous services to diverse destinations led to Brussels-Central becoming the busiest station in Belgium. Brussels-North, Brussels-Central and Brussels-South are now the three main railways stations in the city; they are also the three busiest stations in all of Belgium.

Between 2018 and 2019, the North–South connection's tunnel was renovated to improve ventilation and smoke extraction in the event of a fire. The six-lane underground tunnel, separated by the pillars supporting the vault, was transformed into a tunnel with three openings separated by walls provided with fire doors at regular intervals (an operation carried out by walling the openings between the pillars). The ends of the platforms of Brussels-Central station were also affected.

== Stations ==
The stations on the North–South connection, from north to south, are:

- Brussels-North (French: Bruxelles-Nord (STIB: Gare du Nord); Dutch: Brussel-Noord (MIVB: Noordstation))
- Brussels-Congress (French: Bruxelles-Congrès; Dutch: Brussel-Congres)
- Brussels-Central (French: Bruxelles-Central (STIB: Gare Centrale); Dutch: Brussel-Centraal (MIVB: Centraal Station))
- Brussels-Chapel (French: Bruxelles-Chapelle; Dutch: Brussel-Kapellekerk)
- Brussels-South (French: Bruxelles-Midi (STIB: Gare du Midi); Dutch: Brussel-Zuid (MIVB: Zuidstation)); the Eurostar, TGV and ICE international terminal

The stations Brussels-North and Brussels-South are also linked by the North–South Axis of the premetro (underground tram) system, which runs through the city centre to the west of the railway line.

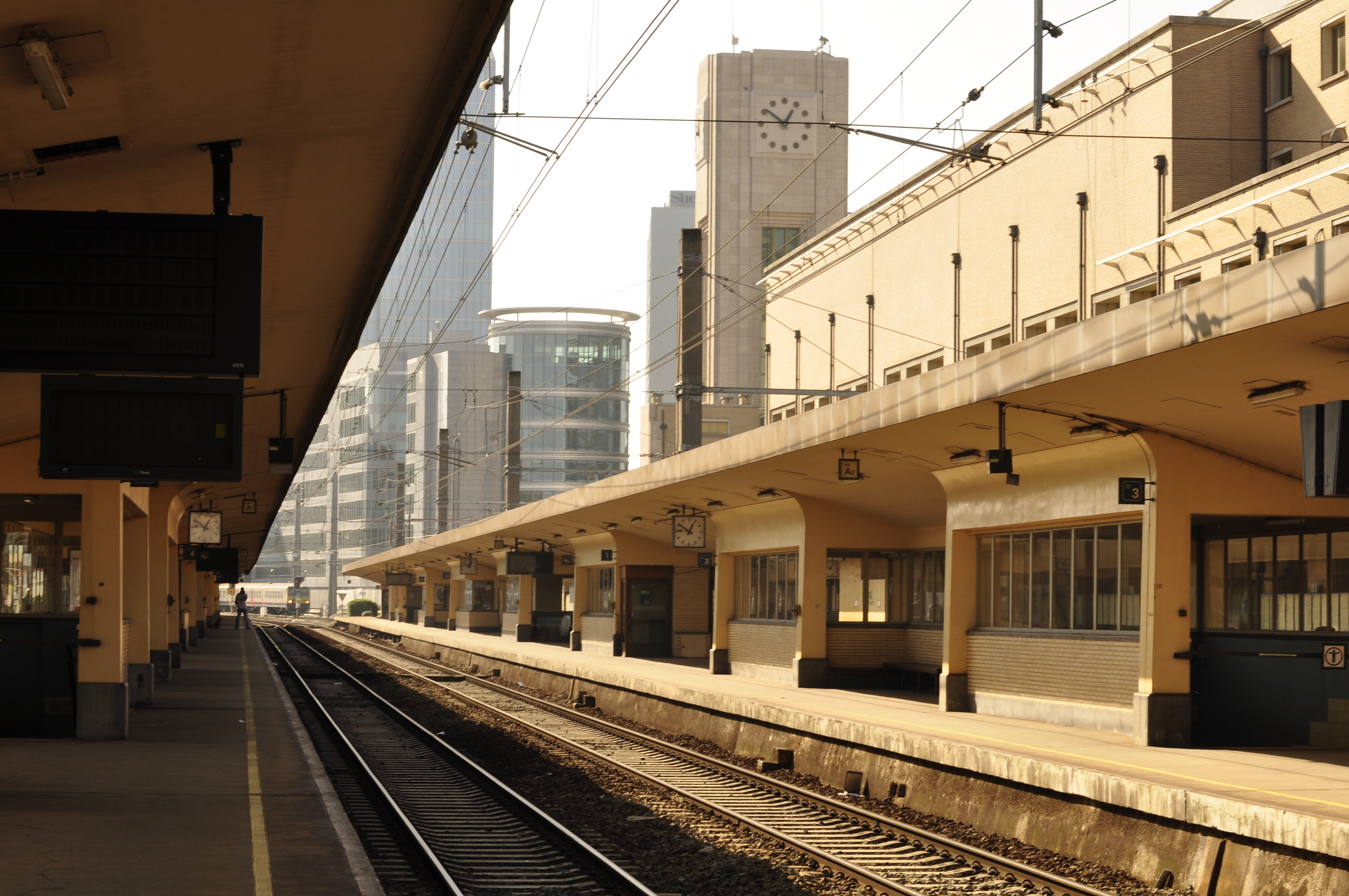
View of Brussels-North's tracks, taken from one of the platforms

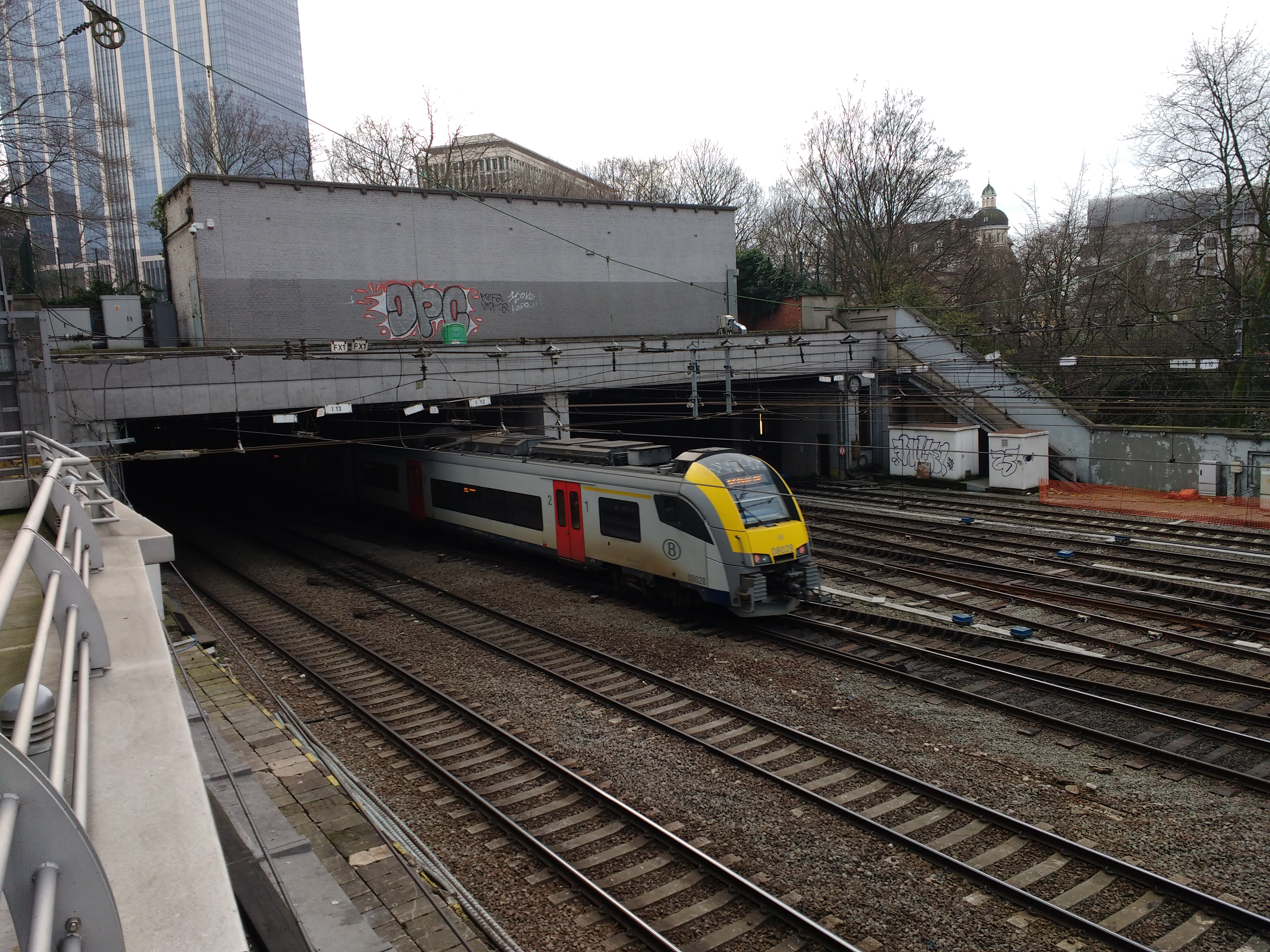
The northern end of the North–South connection's tunnel, just south of Brussels-North, near the Botanical Garden

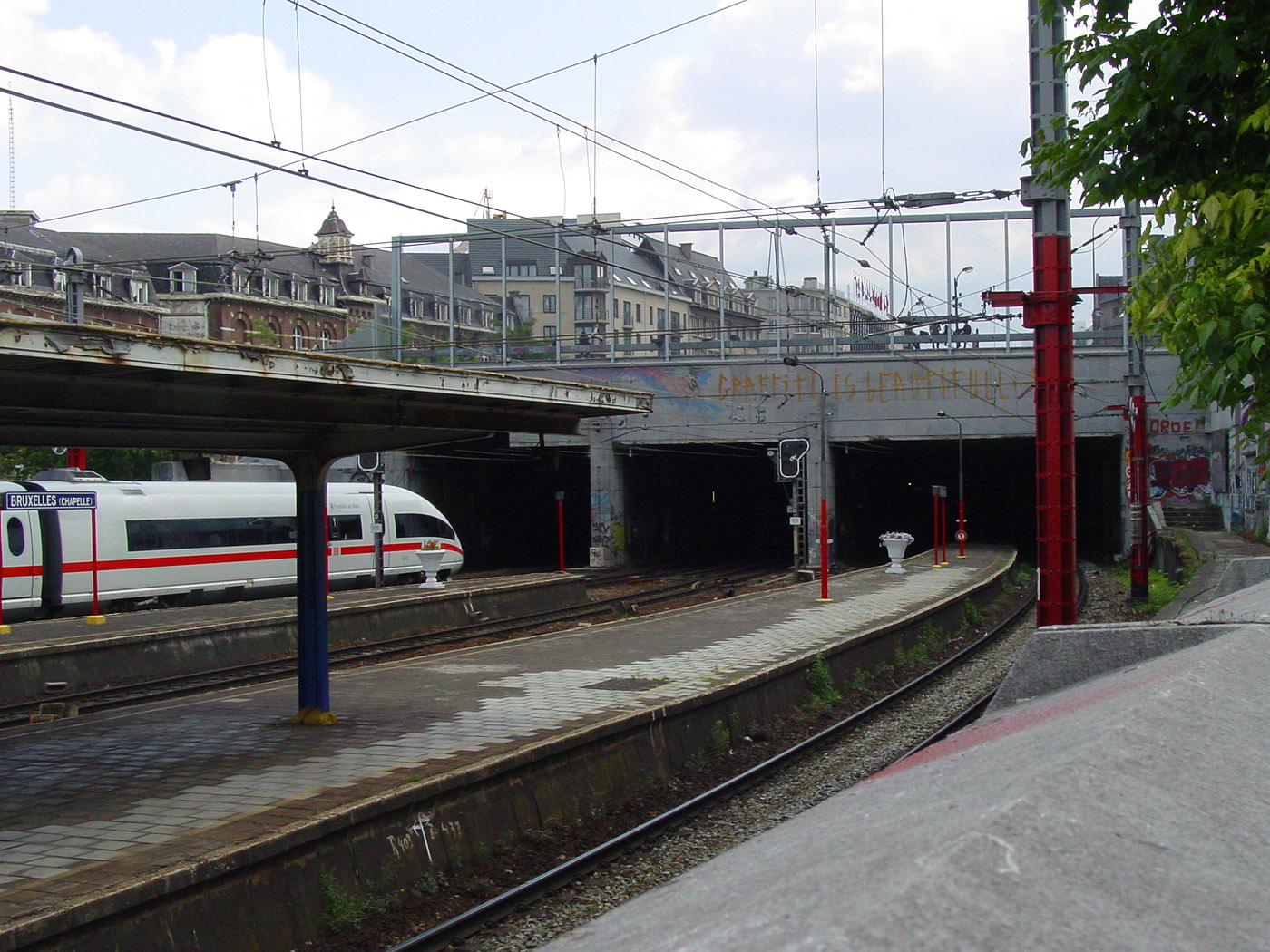
The southern end of the North–South connection's tunnel, at Brussels-Chapel

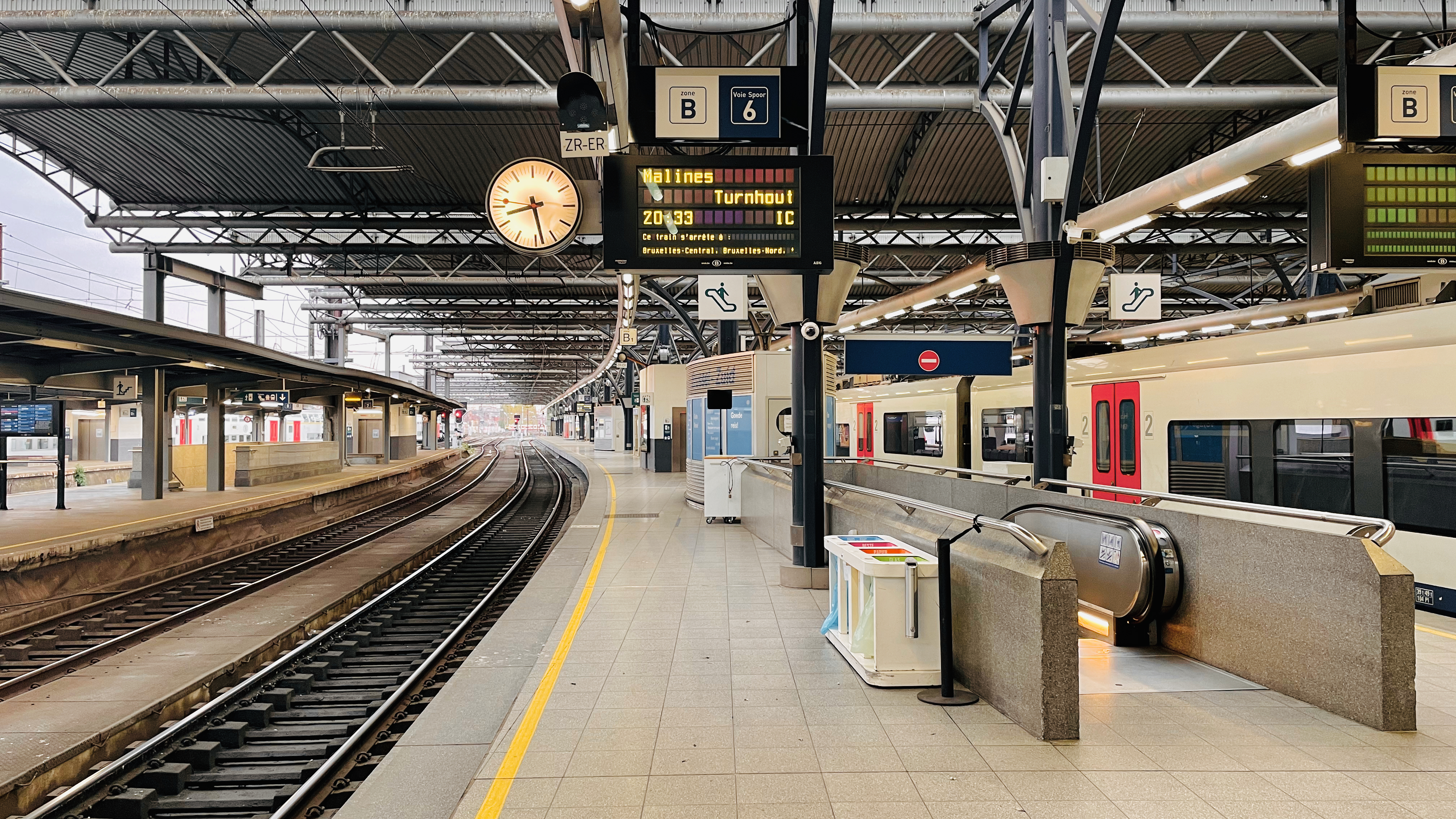
View of Brussels-South's platforms and tracks

== Operations ==
All regular national (inter-city and local) trains that use the line stop at North, Central and South stations. The international high-speed Eurostar and TGV services stop only at the international terminal of Brussels-South. ICEs have an additional stop at Brussels North. International trains, other than high-speed trains, terminating in Brussels-South, are the thrice-weekly NightJet sleepers to and from Austria (stopping at South and North stations) and the hourly Benelux trains to and from The Hague or Amsterdam (stopping at South, Central and North stations). Congress and Chapel stations are served twice an hour in each direction, on weekdays only, by a commuters' train on the Antwerp–Nivelles line.

The line is not used by freight trains; the only non-passenger trains allowed on this line are the rare trains performing infrastructure maintenance on the North–South connection itself. To avoid further congestion, all freight traffic crossing between the north and south of Brussels is routed instead along either line 26, to the east (Halle to Vilvoorde, via Merode), or along line 28, to the west (Brussels-South to Bockstael via Brussels-West and Simonis).

== Commemoration ==
The Brunfaut family was closely involved in the construction of the North–South connection. In 1947, Fernand Brunfaut became president of the National Bureau of the North–South connection. The same year, the construction of Brussels-Central was entrusted to his son, Maxime Brunfaut, following the death of the architect Victor Horta. Two memorial plaques in the Central Station's main hall commemorate the station's opening. On the left-hand side of the second plaque is a medallion bearing Fernand Brunfaut's image.

The North–South connection was also selected as the main motif of a very high value collectors' coin: the Belgian 50th Anniversary of the North–South connection commemorative coin, minted in 2002. The obverse (front side) shows a train coming out of one of the tunnels in the connection. On the coin is written the words Noord-Zuidverbinding Jonction Nord-Midi ("North–South connection" in Dutch and French, respectively) and the years 1952 (representing the opening of the connection) and 2002.

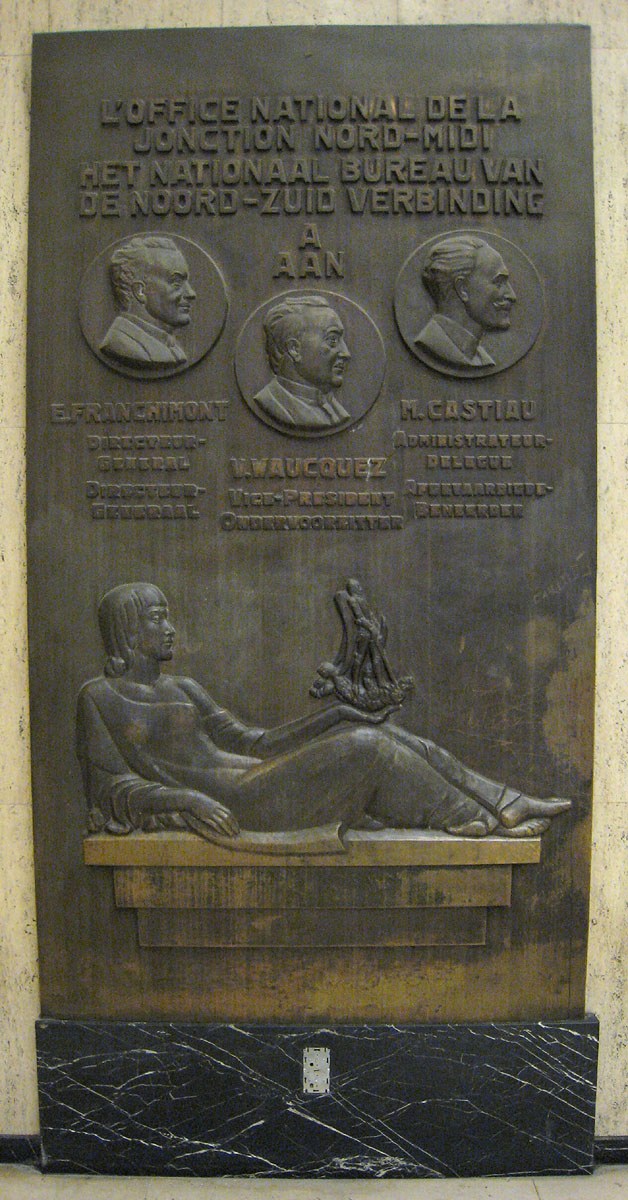
Plaque at Brussels-Central commemorating the opening (panel 1)

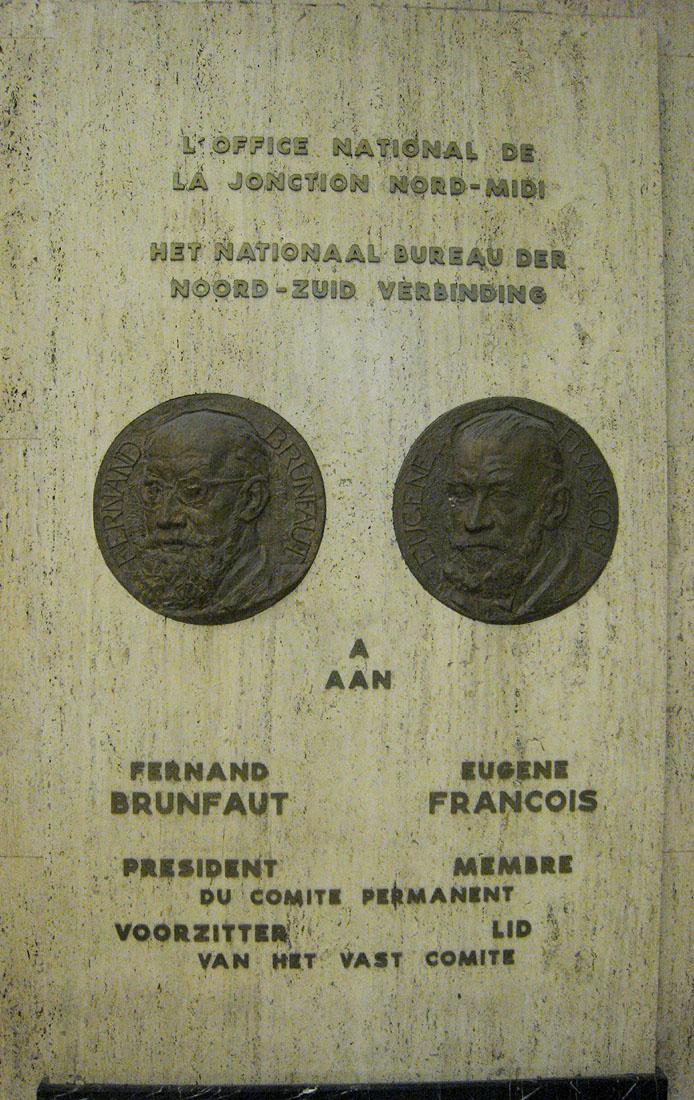
Plaque at Brussels-Central commemorating the opening (panel 2)

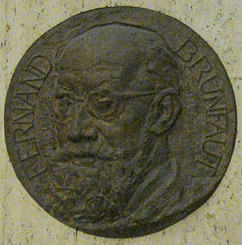
Closeup of the medallion bearing Fernand Brunfaut's image

== See also ==
- List of railway stations in Belgium
- Rail transport in Belgium
- Transport in Brussels
- History of Brussels
