= De Brouckère metro station =

Metro station in Brussels, Belgium

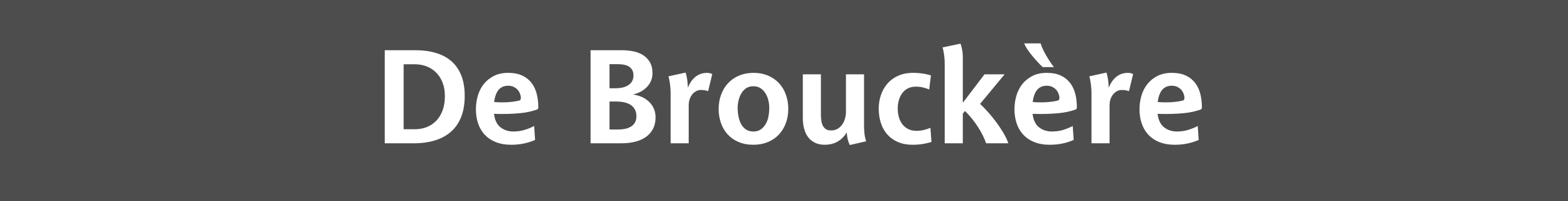

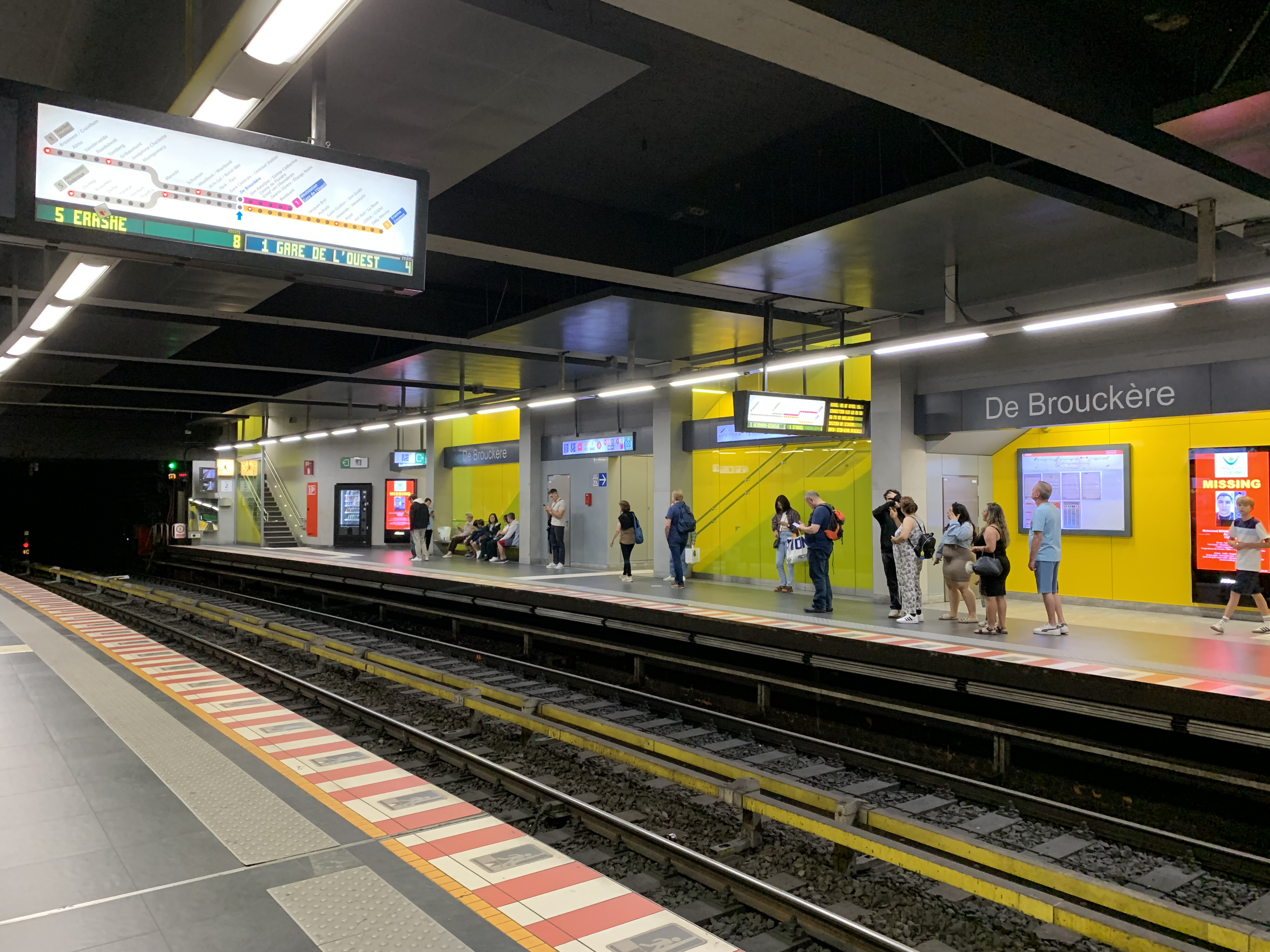
- De Brouckère metro station

General information
- Location: Place de Brouckère / De Brouckèreplein; 1000 City of Brussels, Brussels-Capital Region, Belgium
- Coordinates: 50°51′03″N 4°21′08″E
- Owner: STIB/MIVB
- Platforms: 2 (metro); 2 side platforms and 1 island platform (premetro)
- Tracks: 2 (metro); 2 (premetro)
- Connections: Line 3 Line 4

Construction
- Structure type: Underground

History
- Opened: 17 December 1969; 56 years ago (premetro); 20 September 1976; 50 years ago (metro)

Services
Preceding station	Brussels Metro	Following station
Sainte-Catherine/Sint-Katelijne towards Gare de l'Ouest/Weststation	Line 1	Gare Centrale/Centraal Station towards Stockel/Stokkel
Sainte-Catherine/Sint-Katelijne towards Erasme/Erasmus	Line 5	Gare Centrale/Centraal Station towards Herrmann-Debroux
Location

De Brouckère (French pronunciation: [də bʁukɛʁ]) is a rapid transit station located under the Place de Brouckère/De Brouckèreplein in central Brussels, Belgium. It consists of both a metro station (serving lines 1 and 5) and a premetro (underground tram) station (serving lines 4 and 10 on the North–South Axis between Brussels-North railway station and Albert premetro station). The station takes its name from that aboveground square, itself named after the former mayor of the City of Brussels, Charles de Brouckère.

The station opened on 17 December 1969 as a premetro station on the tram line between De Brouckère and Schuman. This station was upgraded to full metro status on 20 September 1976, serving former east–west line 1 (further split in 1982 into former lines 1A and 1B). Since 4 October 1976, the station has also accommodated North–South Axis premetro services at separate platforms. Then, following the reorganisation of the Brussels Metro on 4 April 2009, it is served by lines 1, 3, 4 and 5 Line 3 was disbanded in 2024 and replaced by the new line 10.

== History ==
De Brouckère station was inaugurated on 17 December 1969 as a premetro station (i.e. a station served by underground tramways), as part of the first underground public transport route in Belgium, which initially stretched from De Brouckère to Schuman. On 20 September 1976, the premetro line was converted into a heavy metro line, which was later split into two distinct lines on 6 October 1982: former lines 1A and 1B, both serving De Brouckère. On 4 April 2009, metro operation was restructured and the station is now served by metro lines 1 and 5.

Since 4 October 1976, De Brouckère has also been served by the North–South Axis, which is part of the premetro system. Lines 4 and 10 provide most service on that axis.

== Station ==
The premetro station, located under the Place de Brouckère/De Brouckèreplein, is connected to the metro station by a moving walkway. The metro station is located under the Rue de l'Évêque/Bisschopstraat and was renovated in 2005.

The metro station serving lines 1 and 5 is known to have one of the widest gaps between the metro trains and the platform, as this station is curved to follow the alignment between the neighbouring stations Gare Centrale/Centraal Station and Sainte-Catherine/Sint-Katelijne. For safety reasons, the curved platform edges are equipped with flashing lights to warn passengers of the gap.

In 2004, a mural titled The City Moves in the Palm of My Hand was installed along the station's moving walkway. The mural was created by the artist Jan Vanriet and is printed on finished edge panels from PolyVision. The mural is designed to reflect the city's vibrancy and historical background.

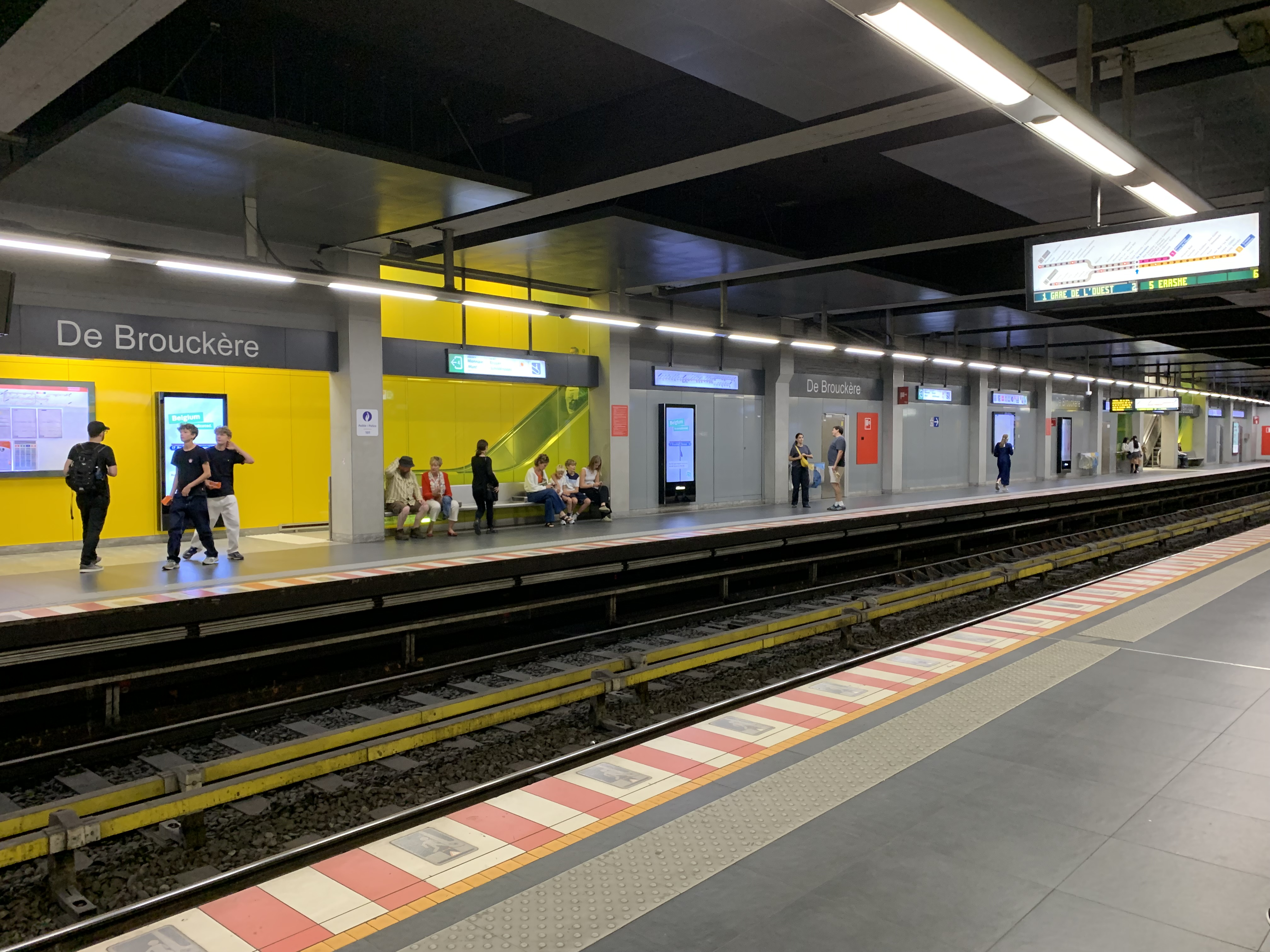
De Brouckère metro station

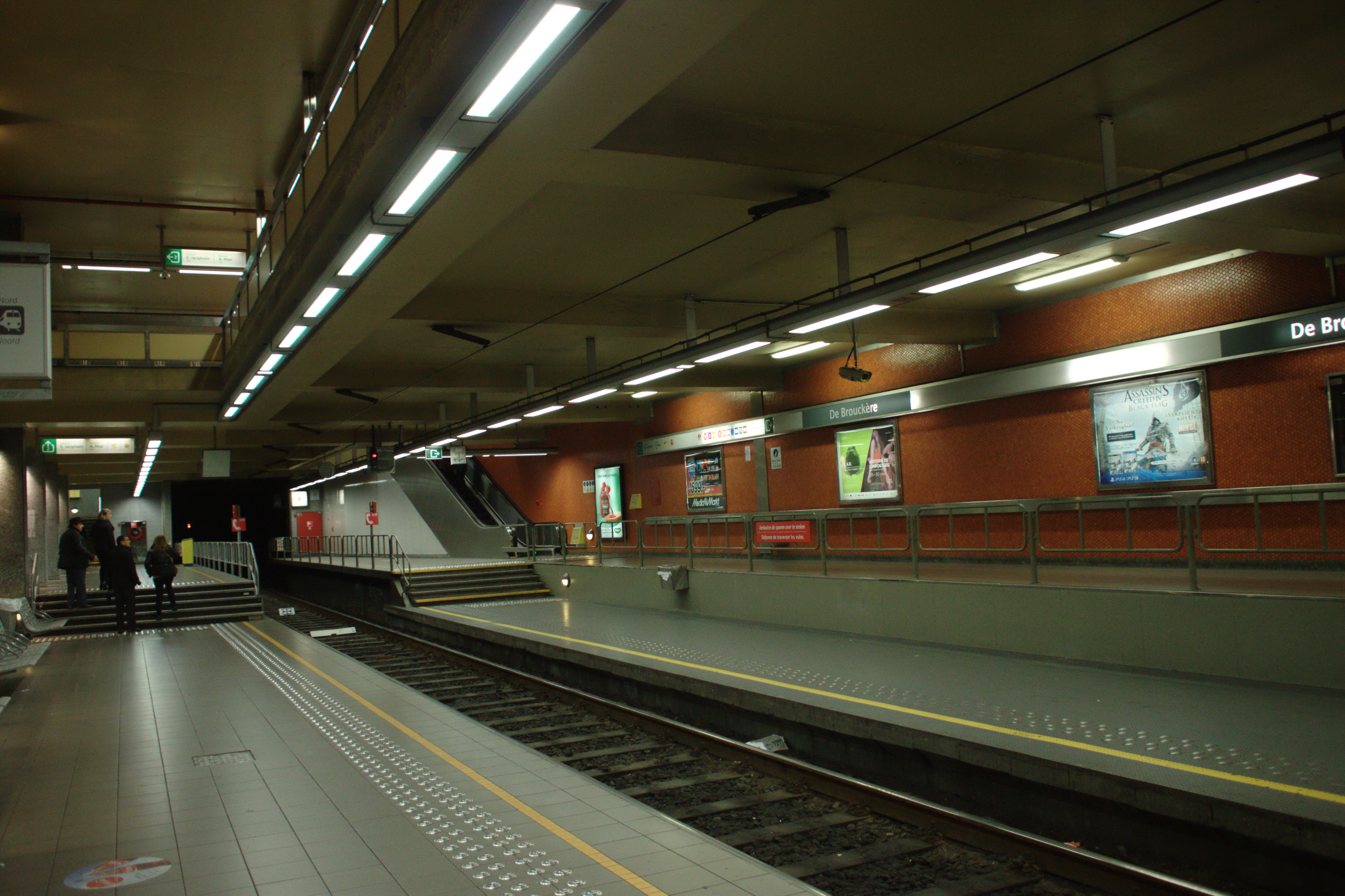
De Brouckère premetro station

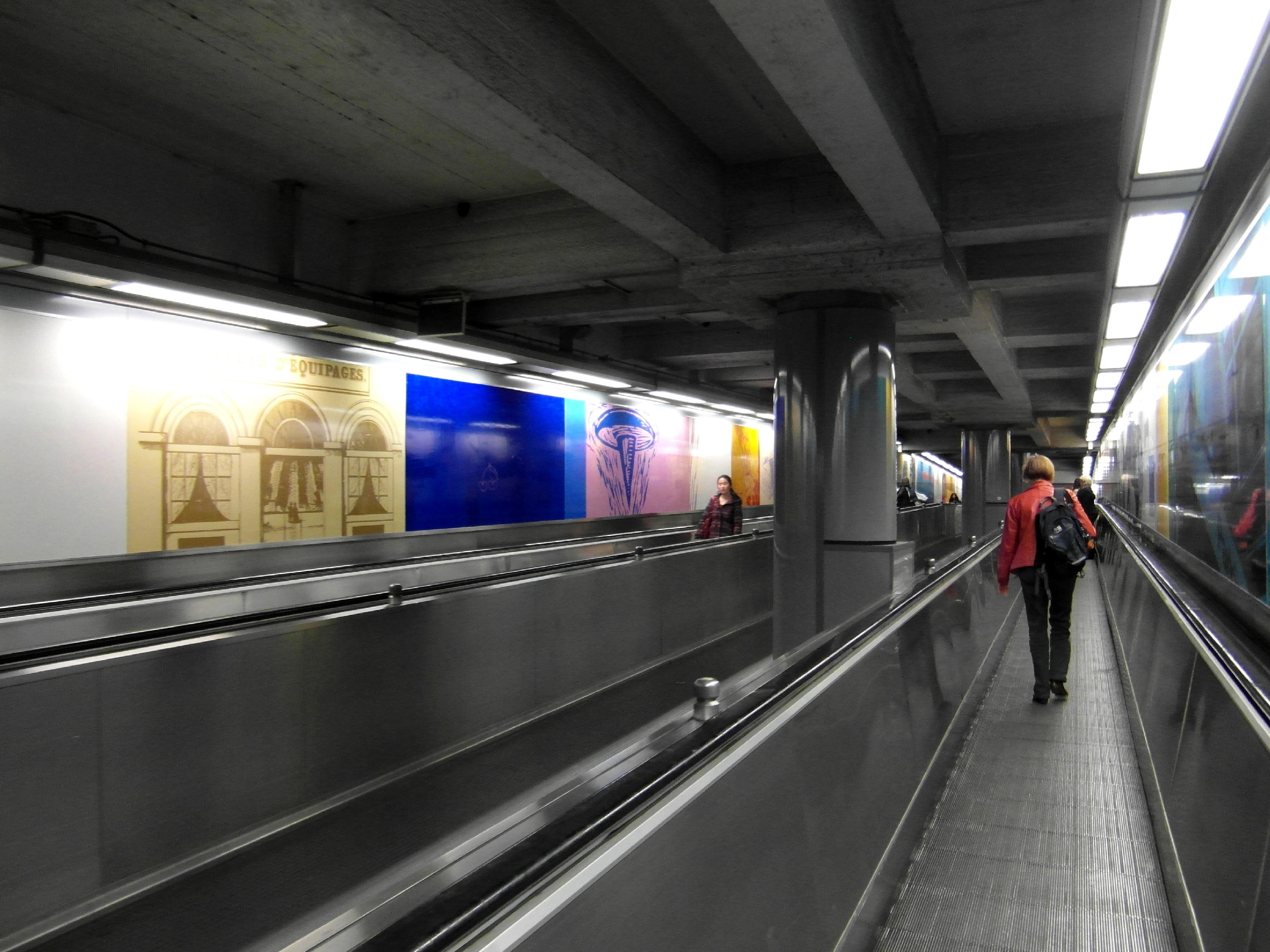
The moving walkway connecting the premetro station with the metro station

== Area ==
The station lies near the Hotel Metropole, the UGC De Brouckère cinema, the Royal Theatre of La Monnaie and one end of the Rue Neuve/Nieuwstraat, Belgium's second busiest shopping street. The whole complex is also connected to the underground shopping galleries between the Place de la Monnaie/Muntplein and the Boulevard Anspach/Anspachlaan.

== See also ==
- Transport in Brussels
- History of Brussels
