= Maxime Brunfaut =

Belgian architect

Maxime Brunfaut (1909–2003) was a Belgian architect.

Brussels Central Station was completed by Maxime Brunfaut following the death of architect Victor Horta in 1947. Brunfaut added a new train line to the national airport and several underground passageways for pedestrians to Horta's design.
