= Les Orangeries de Bierbais =

Park in Mont-Saint-Guibert, Belgium

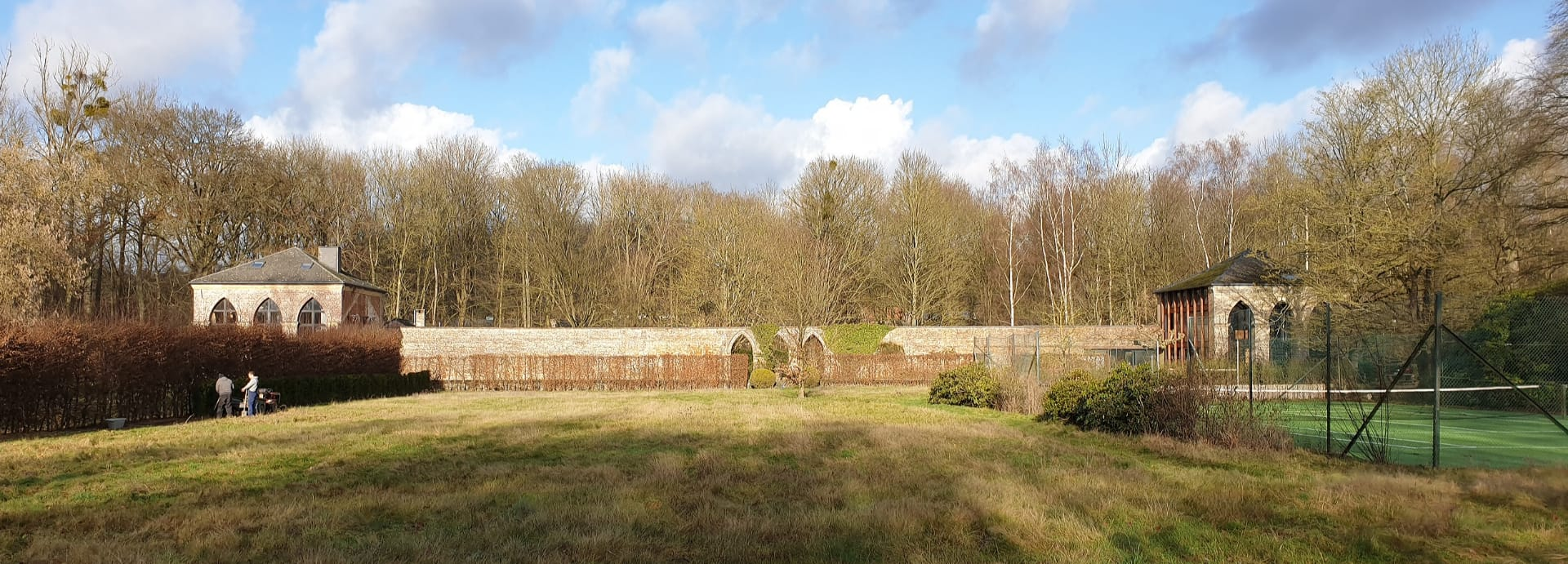

General information
- Type: Garden, greenhouses
- Architectural style: early neo-gothic
- Location: Mont-Saint-Guibert/Hévillers, Belgium
- Coordinates: 50°37′59″N 4°37′00″E
- Completed: 1828
- Client: Baron De Man de Lennick

Design and construction
- Architect: Charles-Henri Petersen

Les Orangeries of Bierbais is located in Hévillers, a section of the municipality of Mont-Saint-Guibert, located in the Wallonia in the province of Walloon Brabant in Belgium.

The Orangeries of Bierbais were part, until the end of the 1980s, of the park of the Château de Bierbais. This part of the park, covering an area of 2.5 hectares, in the 19th century housed not only a collection of remarkable fruit and ornamental trees, but also monumental heated greenhouses of international reputation, the greenhouses of Bierbais, in the style of English gardens designed by the landscape architect Charles-Henri Petersen. Petersen lived at Bierbais until his death in 1859.

Since 2019, the two remaining orangeries have been transformed into a third place hosting residences for artists and researchers as well as cultural activities, periodically open to the public.

== History ==
=== The time of gardening in the 19th century ===
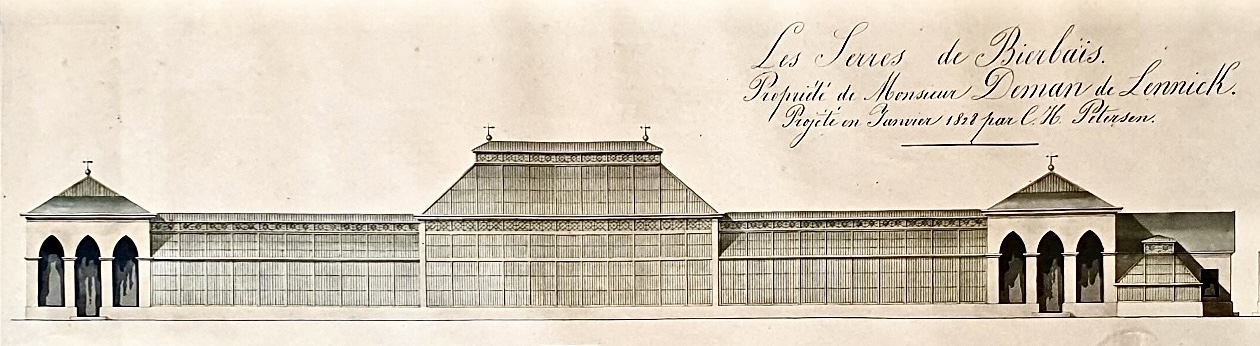
Cross-section of the monumental greenhouses designed by Charles-Henri Petersen.

About forty years after Immanuel Kant introduced "the art of gardens" among the fine arts (1790), Baron De Man de Lennick, at the very moment when a wave of effervescence around this art swept through the Europe, notably France and England, has succeeded in satisfying, according to the book Temps du paysage by the philosopher Jacques Rancière. which deals with this period in the history of gardening, "an autonomous criterion of beauty by producing a specific pleasure, that which is born from the imitation of nature": "What is the amateur, Belgian or foreign, who does not know this beautiful property of Bierbais, whose turrets can be seen near the station of Mont-Saint-Guibert; this modern castle, built on an eminence in the middle of a grandiose park with secular trees".

The park was to "imitate the features exhibited by objects and beings of nature in such a way as to make them recognizable, while beautifying them; but also to imitate, by assembling these traits of visible nature, an invisible nature defined as the perfect connection of its elements into a coherent whole", which, according to the Journal d'horticulture pratique de la Belgique (1857), seems to be precisely the case: "the most beautiful grapes, strawberries and pineapples, apricots and peaches bloom and bear fruit at will and in all seasons, alongside the most beautiful representatives of the flora of Asia, America and of Africa."

In addition to the park, the greenhouses, daring in their monumental early use of iron, inaugurated on September 29, 1828, a year before Petersen finalized those of the Botanical Garden of Brussels, became famous: "Bierbais, whose greenhouses can rival those of the dukes of England and which in fact can show one of the continent's vastest collections of palms both for the quantity of the species as for the strength and the size of the trees."

Like the park, they too should not be satisfied with "reproducing the features of recognizable things", but assemble "the features borrowed from the most beautiful models into a perfect figure which mere nature does not comprise": "no such steps, point of these wooden tablets, which remove the illusion and which are the anomaly of our greenhouses. It is a real parterre, interspersed with paths, ponds and lined with artificial rocks from which springs, here and there, a jet of water from among the greenery." The qualities that refer to the natural landscape of a visible garden, as wonderful as they are, are not enough – it takes more than that, something supernatural, Edenic. In short, what is sought after, and which the park and the greenhouses of Bierbais seem to offer, "is a real paradise".

=== Historical descriptions of the park, the greenhouses and the collections ===
At least two detailed descriptions of the park with its greenhouses remain today. The first, from 1846, was published in the journal Art de construire et gouverner les serres [Art of Building and Governing Greenhouses]:

"In Belgium, as in England, more than in France, great importance is attached to the construction of shelters which must receive plants which cannot live in the open air in temperate climates. The countless greenhouses that cover the soil of both Flanders and Brabant bear witness to this: amateur horticulturists and professional horticulturists compete in zeal on this subject. However, although the greenhouses of the latter are often erected with a certain research, they do not acquire this degree of architectural splendor or elegance that cannot be approached for merchant greenhouses, since the heads of establishments are obliged to form special greenhouses for each great family of plants which, growing in latitudes and in very varied conditions, require to be treated with care analogous to that lavished on them by nature in their homeland. But wealthy men, for whom floriculture is a relaxation and a source of lessons, not being subject to the same obligations, can raise these palaces where art is combined with the need for plants, where good taste comes in aid of the mathematical science of the builder. One of the finest models in this genre are the beautiful greenhouses of M. le Baron de Lennick, fig. 95, 96, extending over a length of nearly 430 meters.

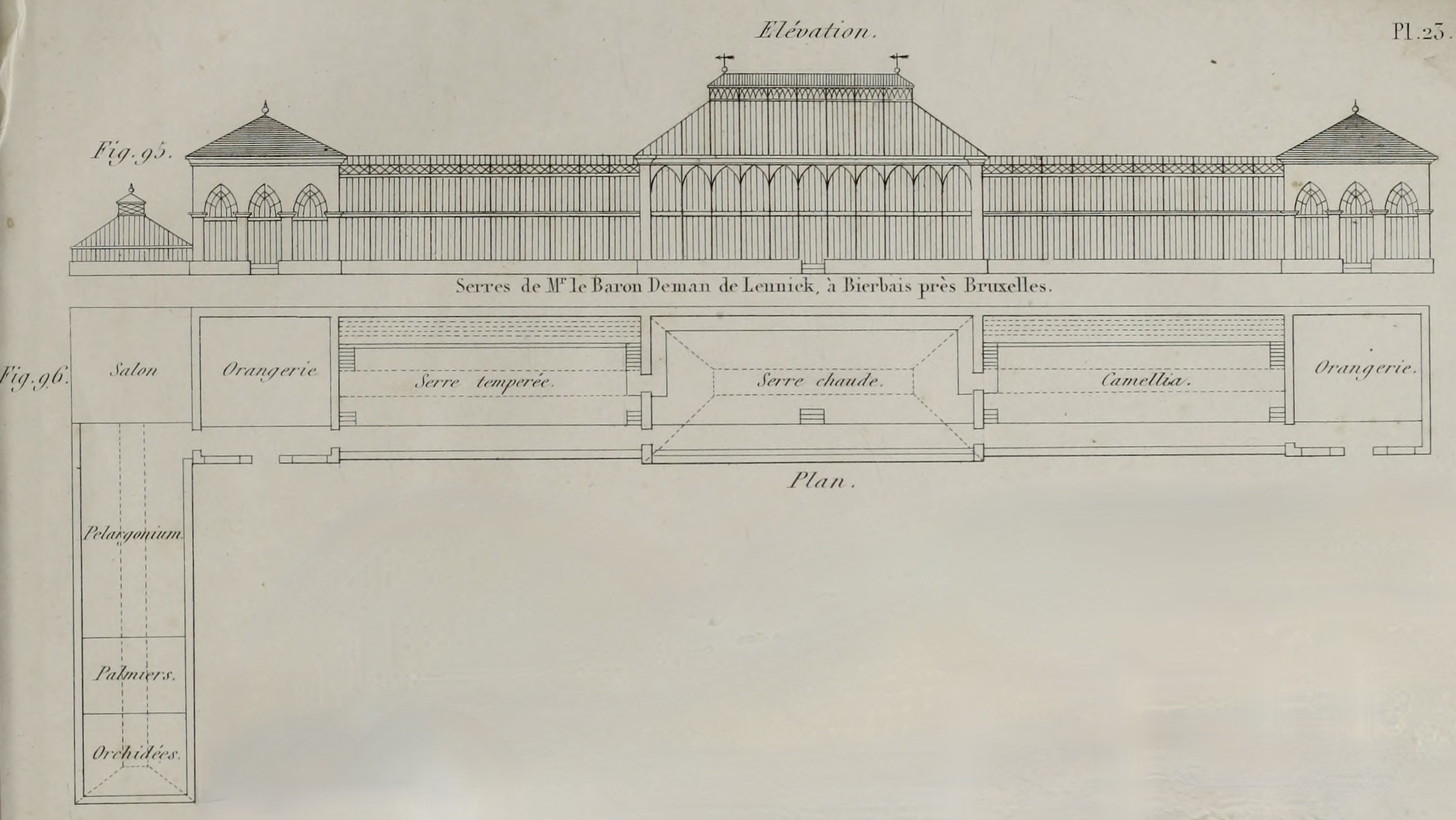
Scheme of the park of Les Orangeries de Bierbais, 1846

The middle pavilion, where are enclosed full of life and health of hothouse plants having the appearance of a forest, at 13 meters 50 centimeters in elevation over a width of 10 meters, and recalls by its structure the great pavilions of the Jardin des Plantes in Paris. The pavilions serving as an orangery and the one in the middle are linked together by two temperate greenhouses. In return, there is a lower pavilion serving as a rest room, then three greenhouses for Pelargoniums, Palms and Orchids. All these greenhouses, entirely constructed of iron and glazed on all sides, with the exception of the orangeries, were erected on the designs and under the direction of Mr. Petersen, whose talent as an architect and as a gardener has grown once unveiled on Belgian soil. The culture and the beauty, even considered individually, of the myriads of plants which shelter these greenhouses, the irreproachable behavior of these, their magnificence standing out in the middle of one of the most beautiful parks that we have seen, all this property of the most richly endowed with what nature and art have that is rarest and most splendid, make this domain one of those marvels that one dares not describe for fear of remaining below reality."

The other, more detailed with regard to what this park contained in terms of species, is bequeathed to us by both the Journal d'horticulture pratique de la Belgique and The Gardener's Chronicle and Agricultural Gazette:

"The collections of Baron de Man de Lennick have a European reputation. What amateur is there, Belgian or foreign, who does not know the beautiful estate of Bierbais, the turrets of which may be seen close to the railway station of Mont-Saint-Guibert; with its modern chateau built upon an eminence in the midst of a park full of fine old trees; its conservatories and ranges of fruit-houses, where the finest Grapes, Strawberries, Pine Apples, Apricots, and Peaches, thrive and bear spontaneously, and at all seasons side by side with specimens of Asiatic, African and American vegetation."

The principal conservatories of Baron De Man de Lennick form a continuous parallelogram of nearly 50 yards long by 10 in height and width. The body of the building has a glazed roof, with upright sashes on the south side, and is divided into three compartments, the first of which serves as a greenhouse, and contain a collection of rare Conifers and other plants belonging to this class. Among them arePodocarpus, Araucaria, A. excelsa and Cunninghamii large enough to bear cones; of Pinus, Cupressus, Taxodium, and Cryptomeria.The centre compartment contains collections of Camellias and Azaleas. Fuchsias, Ericas, and Sikkim Rhododendrons decorate the front of the conservatory along with Palms and Tree Ferns. Extremely rare species of Chamaerops, Balantium, and Marattia, in the form of gigantic specimens, extend their long fronds above the smaller plants. The third and easterly compartment is devoted to Orchids, and to plants which inhabit hot regions and love great heat and a damp atmosphere such as Tillandsias, Aechmeas, Heliconias, Caladiuns, Aroids, and Ferns. They are displayed as a flower garden rather than in stages or wooden boxes, intersected by paths and ornamented with basins, rockwork, and jets of water.

The collection of orchids are composed of various genera and species, such as Aërides crispum, odoratum majus, Cattleya crispa, purpurata and Mossiæ, with a Laelia superbiens, and Grammatophyllum speciosum. Additional orchids can be found beneath the rocks, with Tillandsias and Ferns, now with Caladiums, or species of Pothos and Philodendron; amongst them were most especially Cattleya Trianæi and elegans; Odontoglossum nebulosum, Pescatorei, and grande; Coelogyne maculata and Wallichii, Saccolabium violaceum and retusum, Schomburgkia crispa and marginata; Huntleya meleagris, Vanda Batemanni, Oncidium Lanceanum, Two Heliconias and a Rhopala Jonghii, and Tree Ferns,

Only two years before, in 1857, the flowering of specimens of Laelia elegans caught the attention of the Allgemeine Gartenzeitung: “This plant is so rare in cultivation that it has only been sent to us three times. We received the last flowers from the garden of Mr. Deman de Lennick in Bierbais in Belgium, cultivated by Mr. Keilig. According to the description, this plant must have reached an incredible perfection”.

=== Demolition of the greenhouses ===
The collection began to be sold around July 1857. Despite their "European reputation" and their outsized dimensions, the greenhouses disappeared between the 1860s and 1880s. The precise moment and reasons for the dismantling of these greenhouses remain an enigma.

=== A farm-school for orphans of the 1914-1918 War ===
Shortly after 1900, the Bierbais estate was bought by a certain de Streel, notary in Brussels, who was for a time mayor of Hévillers. "Having lost his two sons during the First World War, he donated the estate to the Orphan-Fund in 1918. This English organization worked to welcome and educate the many war orphans. The hundred children welcomed in Bierbais slept in the stables converted into three large dormitories. Many educational activities were developed in this ideal site: agriculture, horticulture, breeding, carpentry, sports, etc. These courses have been illustrated by numerous period postcards."

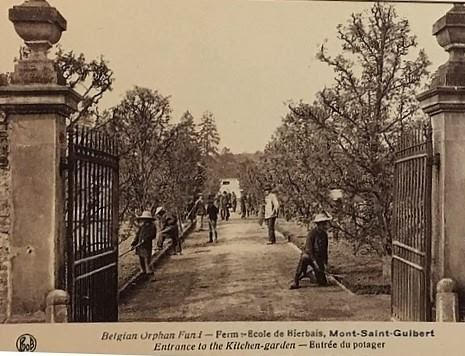
Entrance to the vegetable garden.

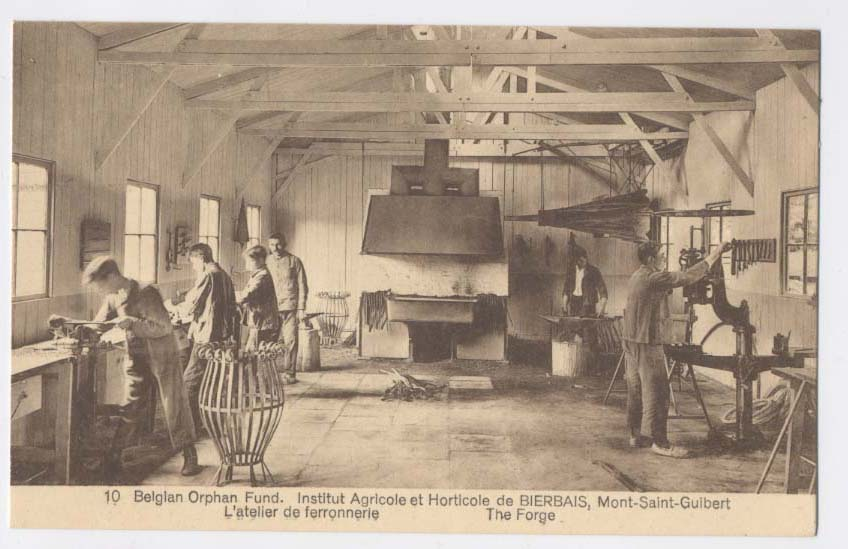
Ironwork workshop.

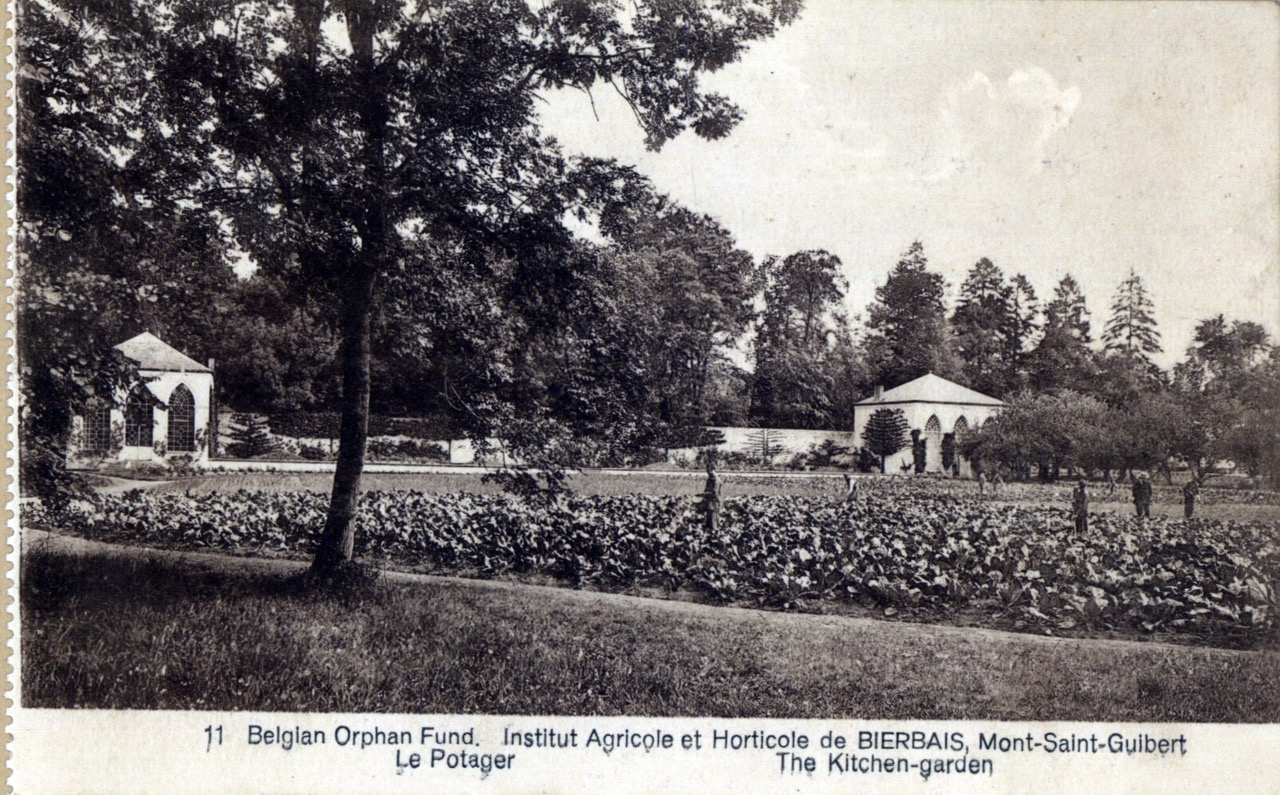
Vegetable garden of the Agricultural and Horticultural Institute of Bierbais.

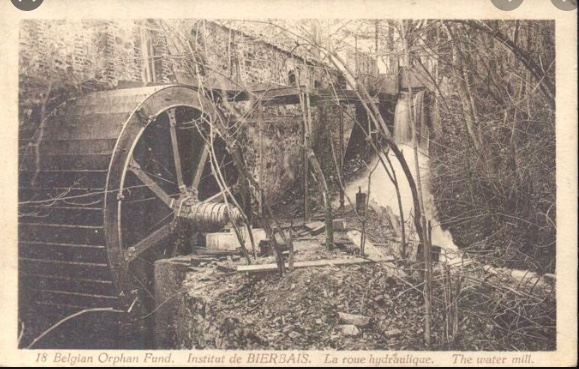
Water wheel.

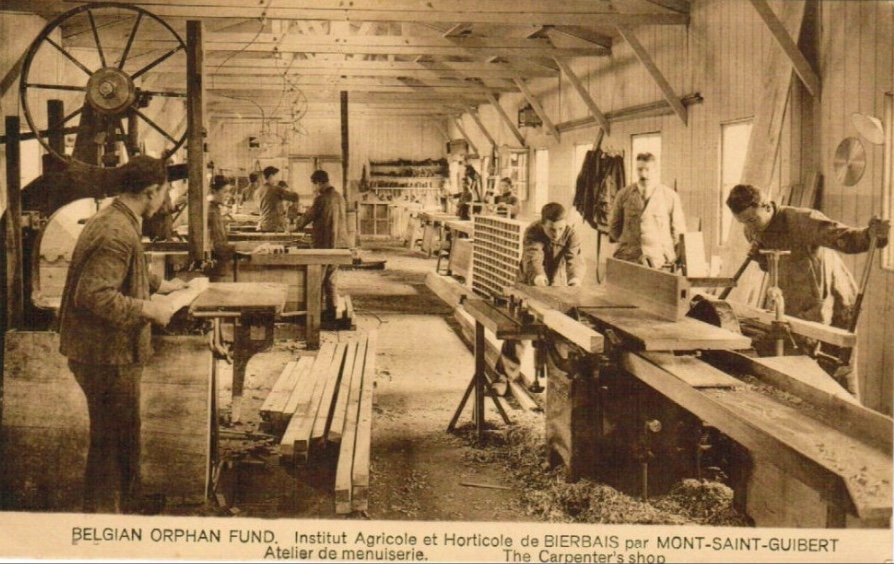
Carpentry workshop.

The photos show intense activity in the various formations, as the English gardens of yesteryear have been transformed into cultivated fields.

=== Architectural remodelling 1970-2019 ===
During the 1970s, the two orangeries, all that remains of the monumental greenhouses, were converted into dwellings by the architect Édouard Carlier. The east side was completely opened on its west facade in a modernist-brutalist style, and boldly reinforced by eight weathering steel pillars.

=== Contemporary reconfigurations ===
Since 2020, the east side of the Bierbais park, detached from the château since the late 1980s albeit still known as Les Orangeries de Bierbais, has become a third place in permaculture, welcoming artists, researchers and experimenters in residence.

The garden, as a laboratory, poses the hypothesis of a new reconfiguration of the world, of the possible and the impossible, a new relationship between man and society, as well as the relationship between man and nature. The garden becomes a free temporary zone, creating a transitional space of interruptions and re-connections between man, nature and society.

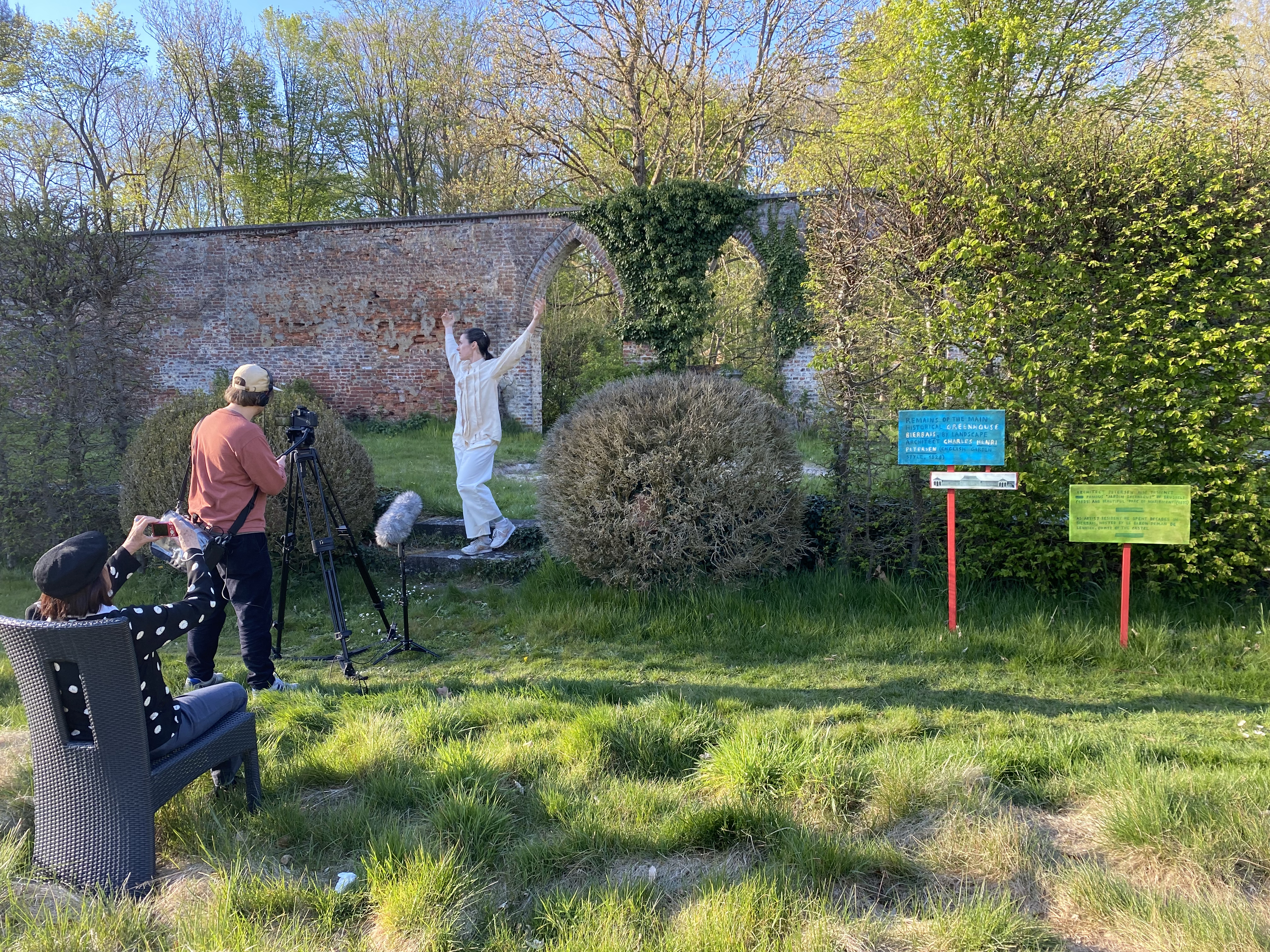
Léa Lansade, solo "For Ettie Moloh", April 2022.

Contemporary Les Orangeries de Bierbais want to examine how the rural environment (in dialectic with urbanity) can affect human emancipation and how Peace in the world can be thought of, from such a place, in connection with the omnipresent war, without escaping it. The goal is to rethink the politics of emancipation through a radically reconfigured new gaze, by proposing a series of actions, including the writing of collective text "(Hypo)theses of Sensible Intelligence", inauguration of the "Collective Garden of Knowledge" on 29. 09. 2022. in the presence of the philosopher Jacques Rancière, during the memorial day of the inauguration of the historic botanical garden of Bierbais, on 29. 9. 1828. by the landscape architect Charles-Henri Petersen (author of Le Botanique, Brussels, 1829; the gardens of Mariemont, 1832). "The Laboratory for Radical Peace" consists of a new redistribution of the sensible aiming at a permanent self-taught aesthetic and emancipatory education.

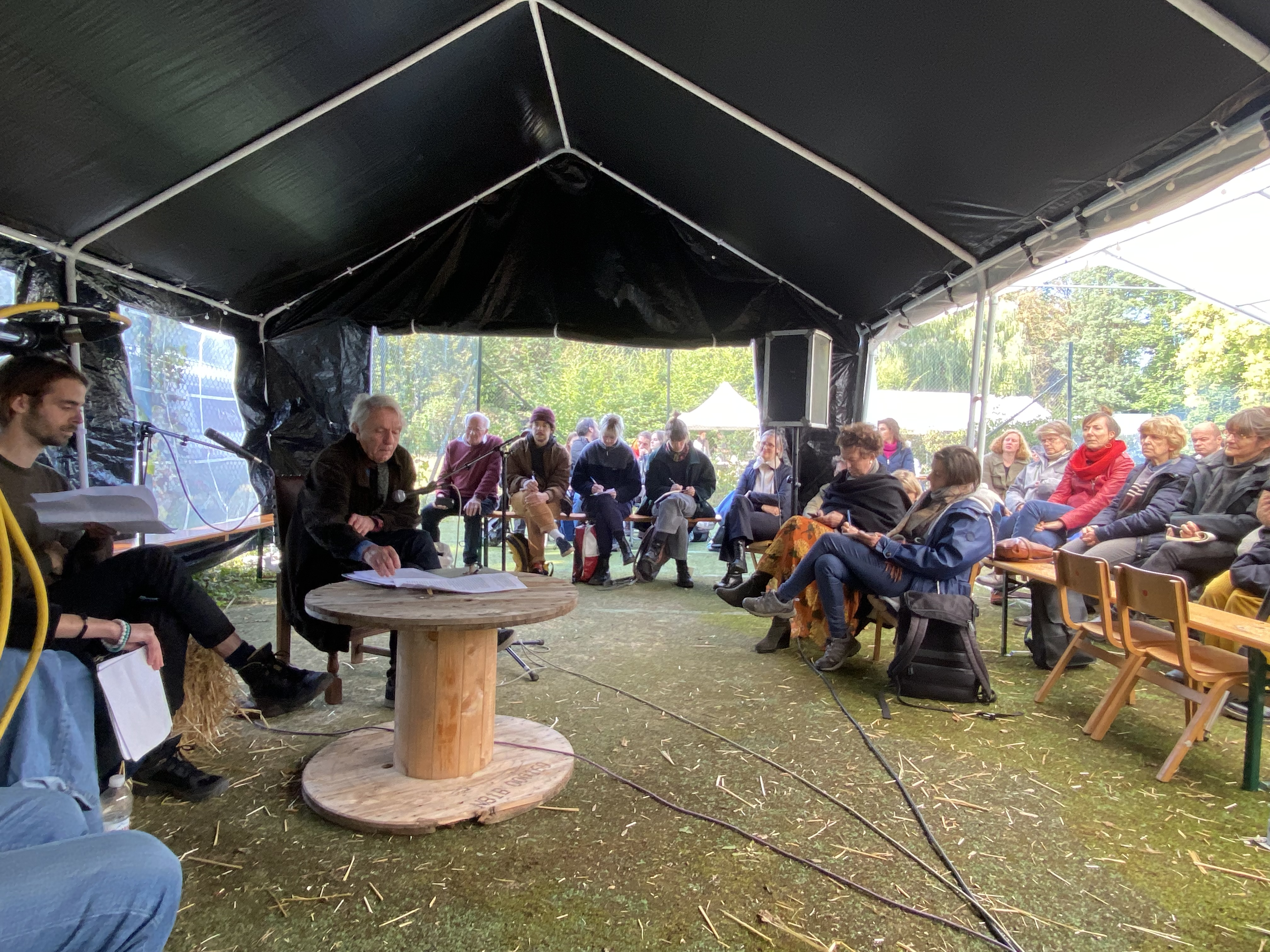
Guerrilla University, meeting with Jacques Rancière, Les Orangeries de Bierbais, 29. 9. 2022.

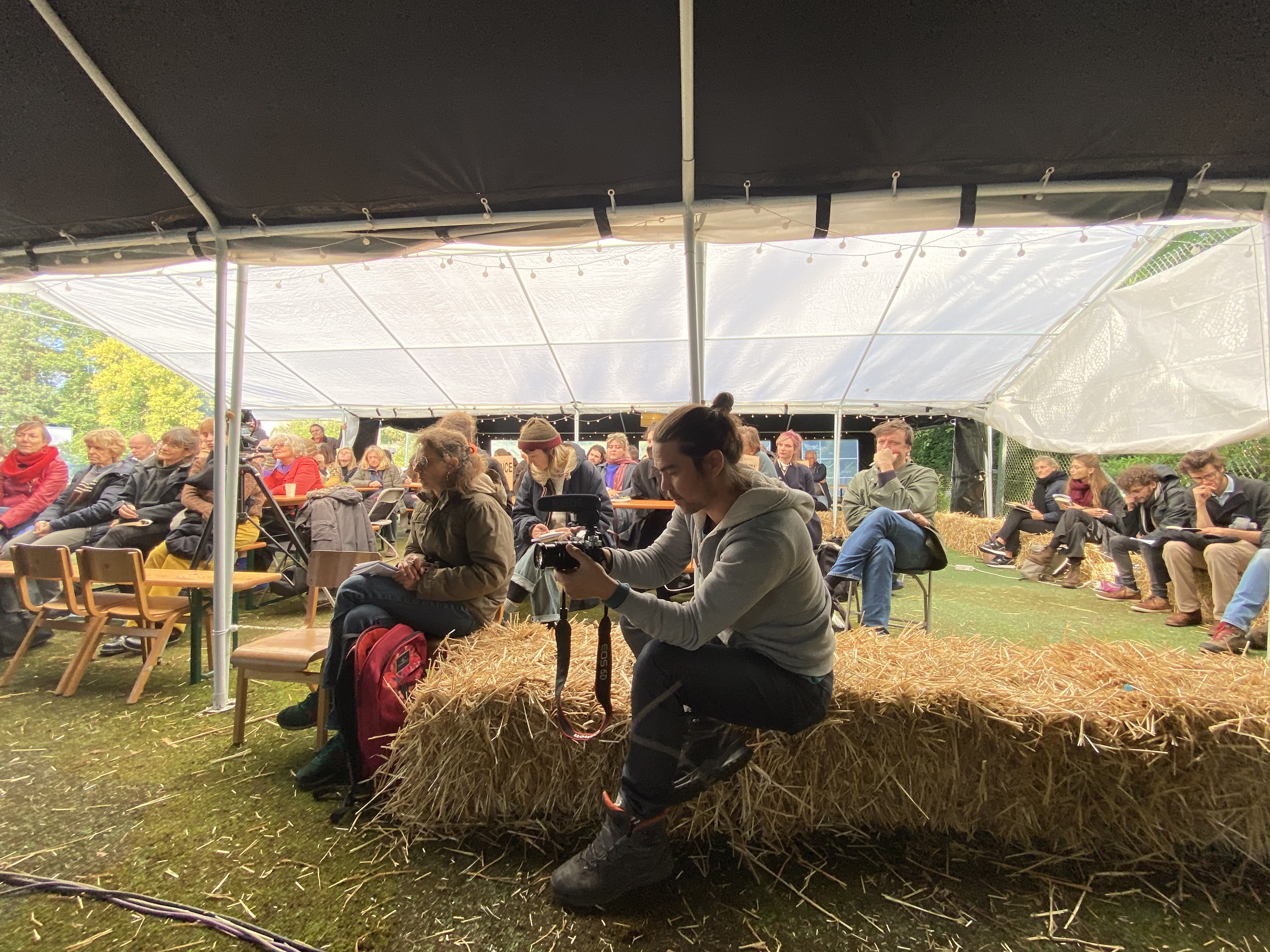
Guerrilla University, meeting with Jacques Rancière, Les Orangeries de Bierbais, 29. 9. 2022.

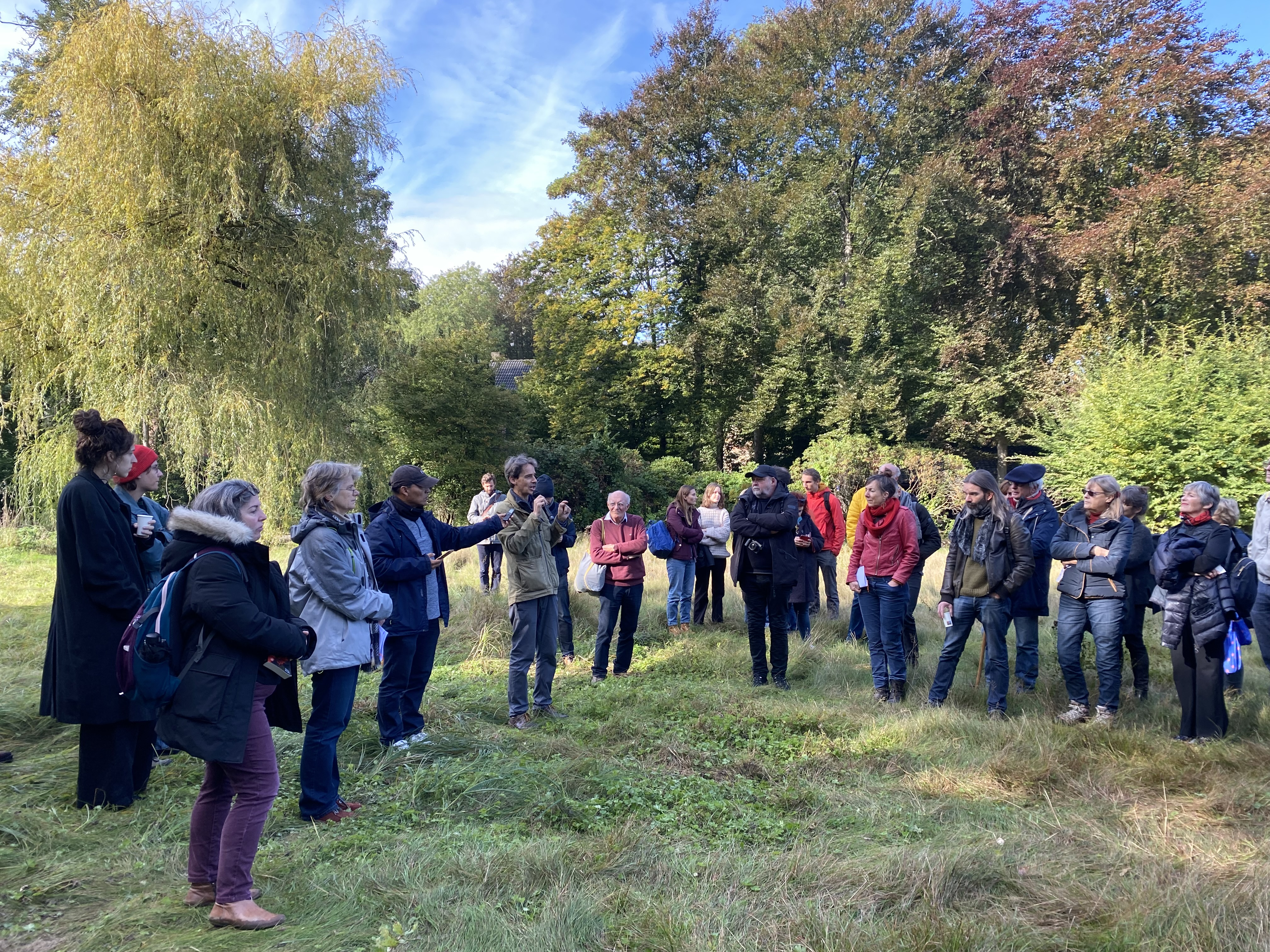
Guerrilla University, meeting with Jacques Rancière, Les Orangeries de Bierbais, 29. 9. 2022.

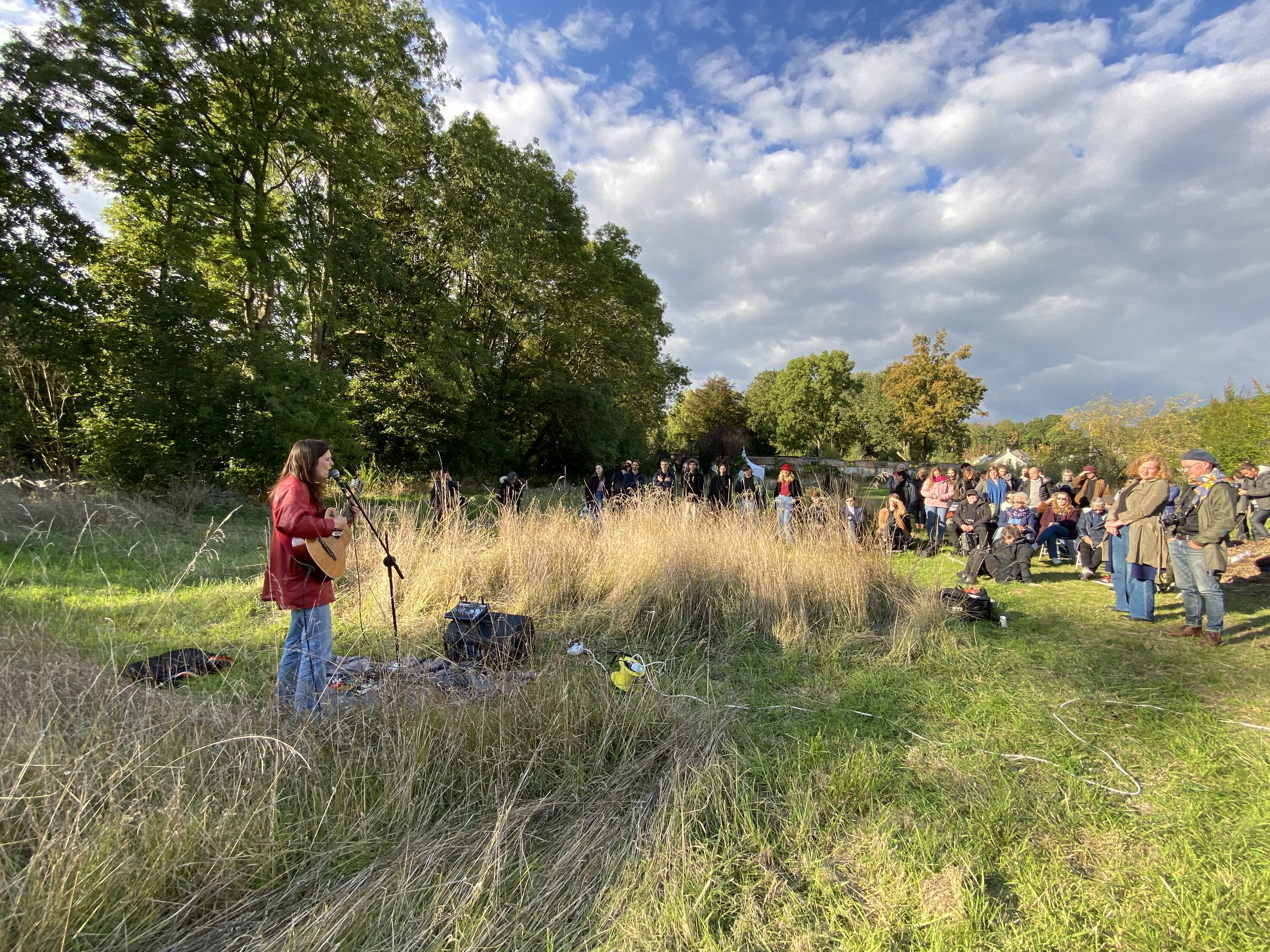
Guerrilla University, meeting with Jacques Rancière, Les Orangeries de Bierbais, 29. 9. 2022.

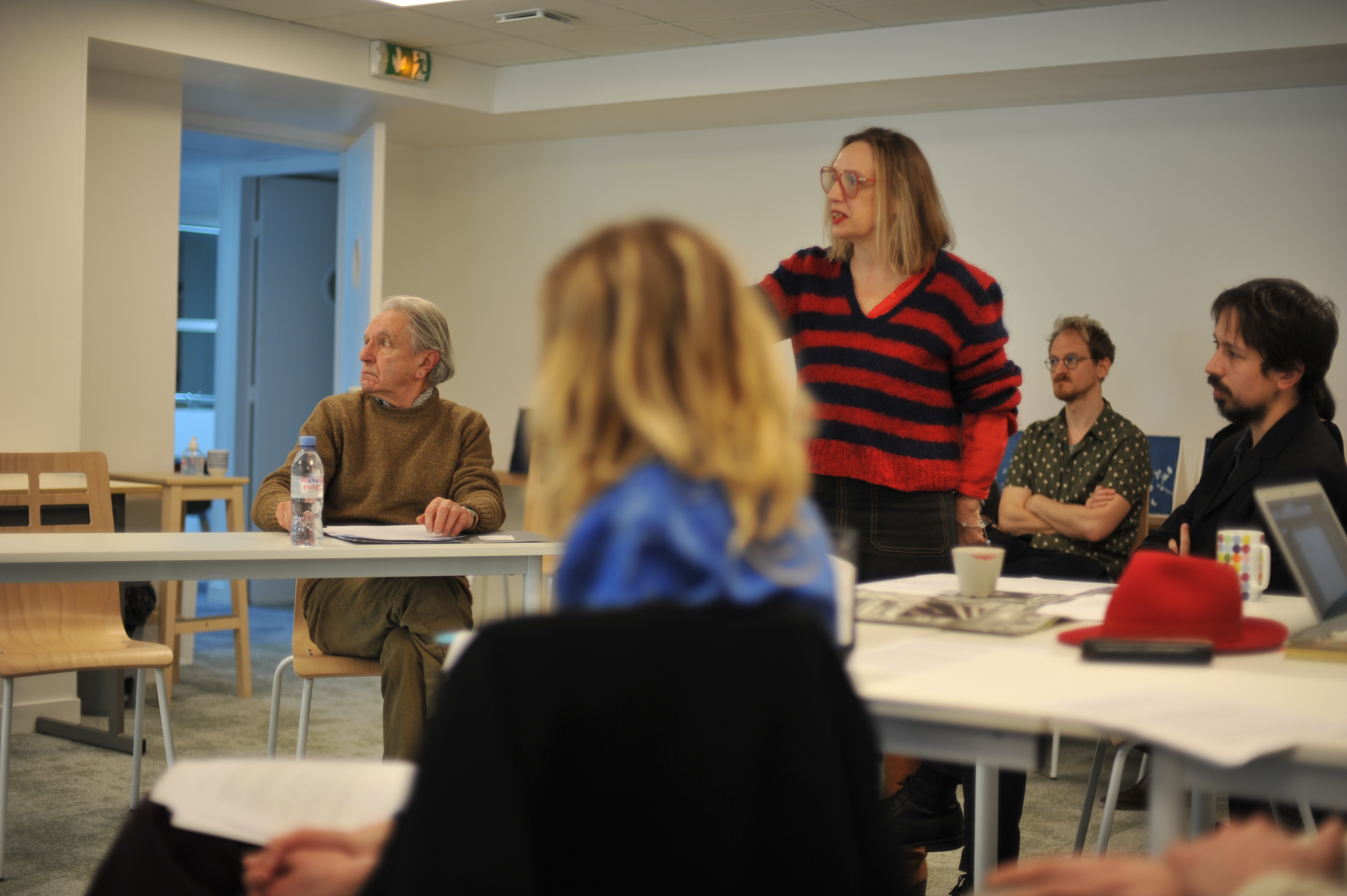
(Hypo)theses of Sensible Intelligence: Meeting and Discussion with Jacques Rancière, and the Theses Working Group, Paris, Kulturakademiet, 18. 3. 2023.

=== Photo gallery ===
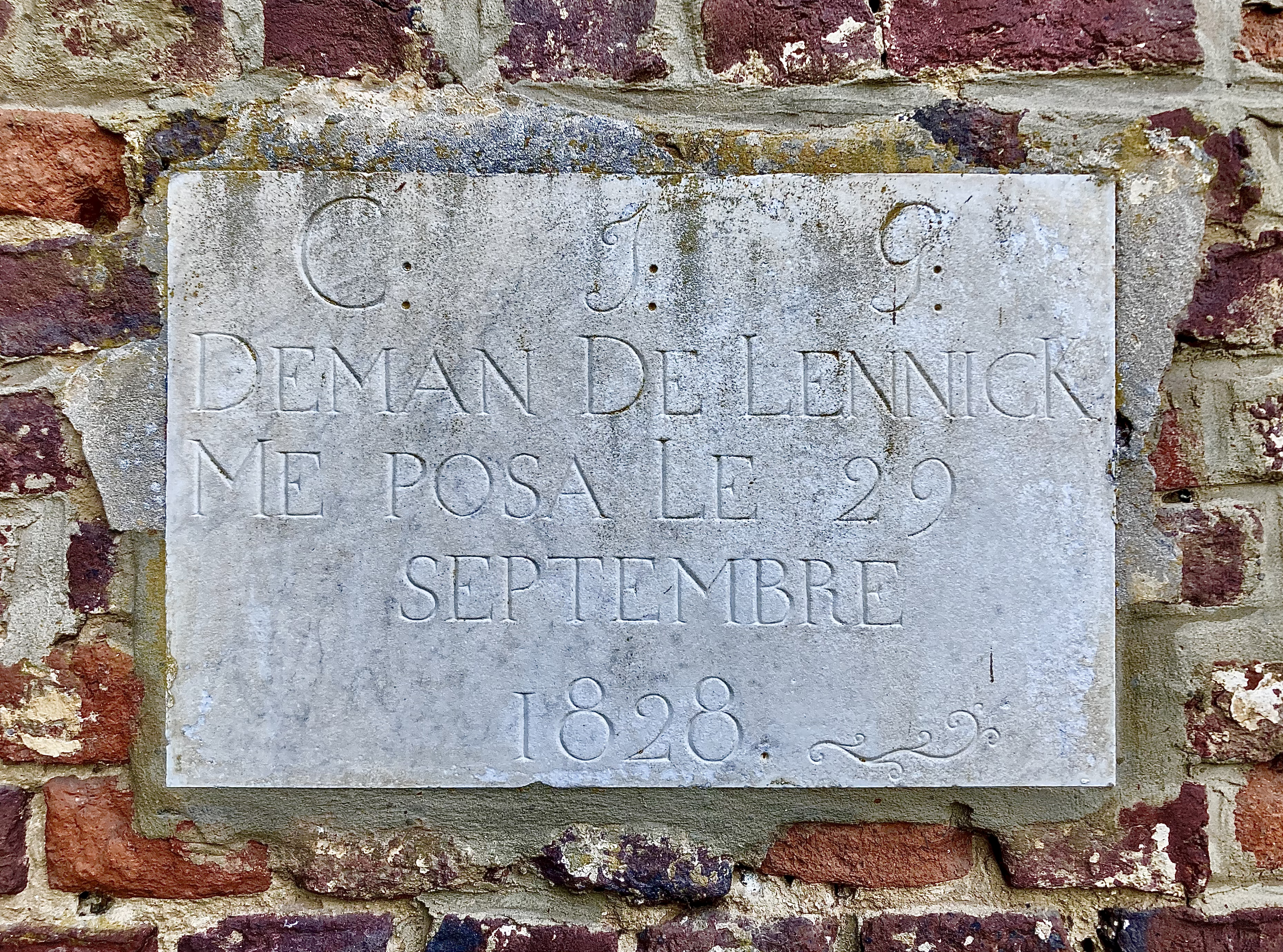
Found stone, set on 29 September 1828.

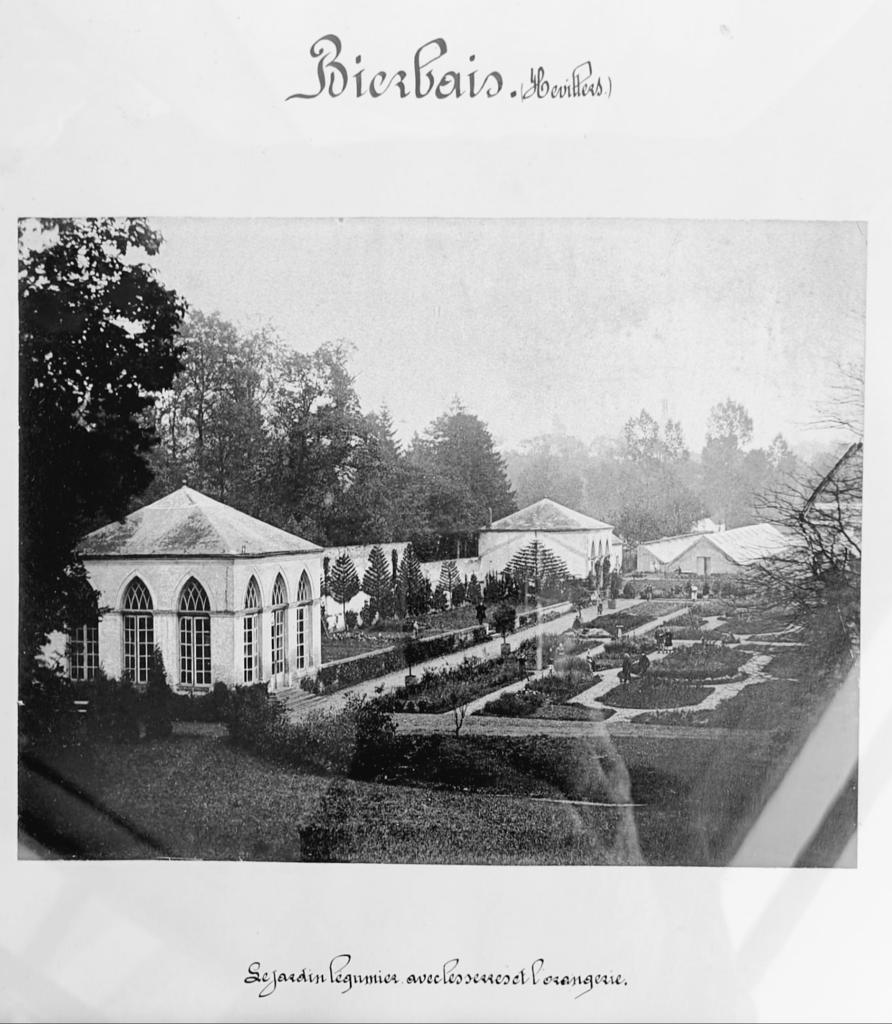
The park without the greenhouses, around 1880.

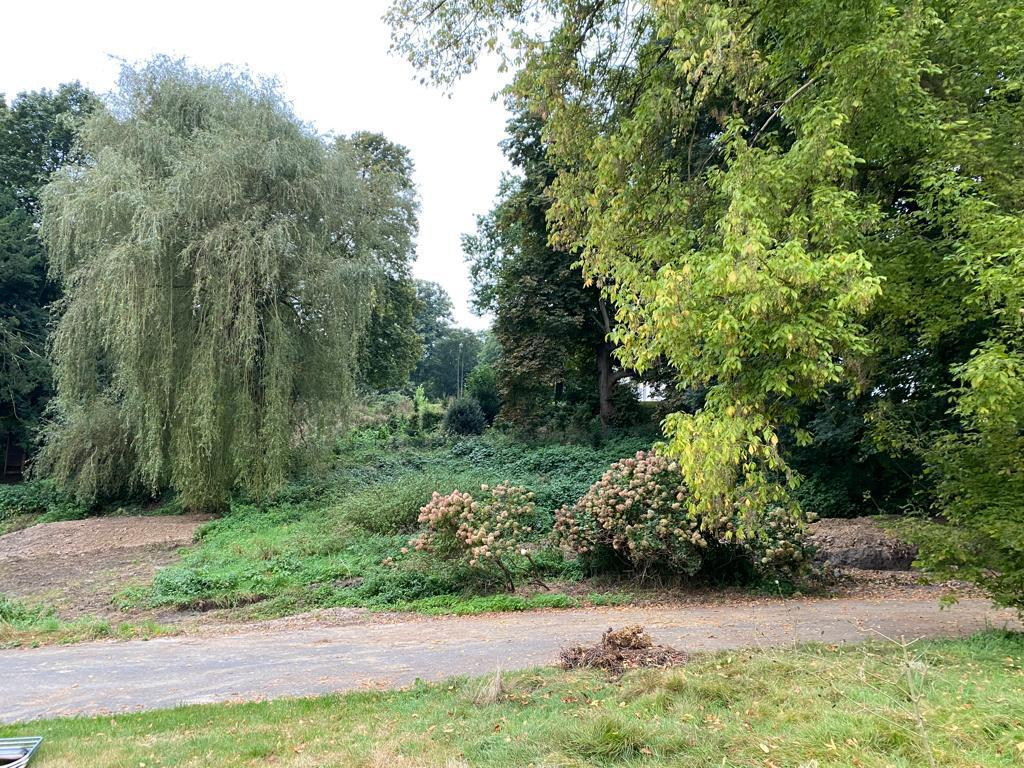
Park of Les Orangeries de Bierbais, 2022.

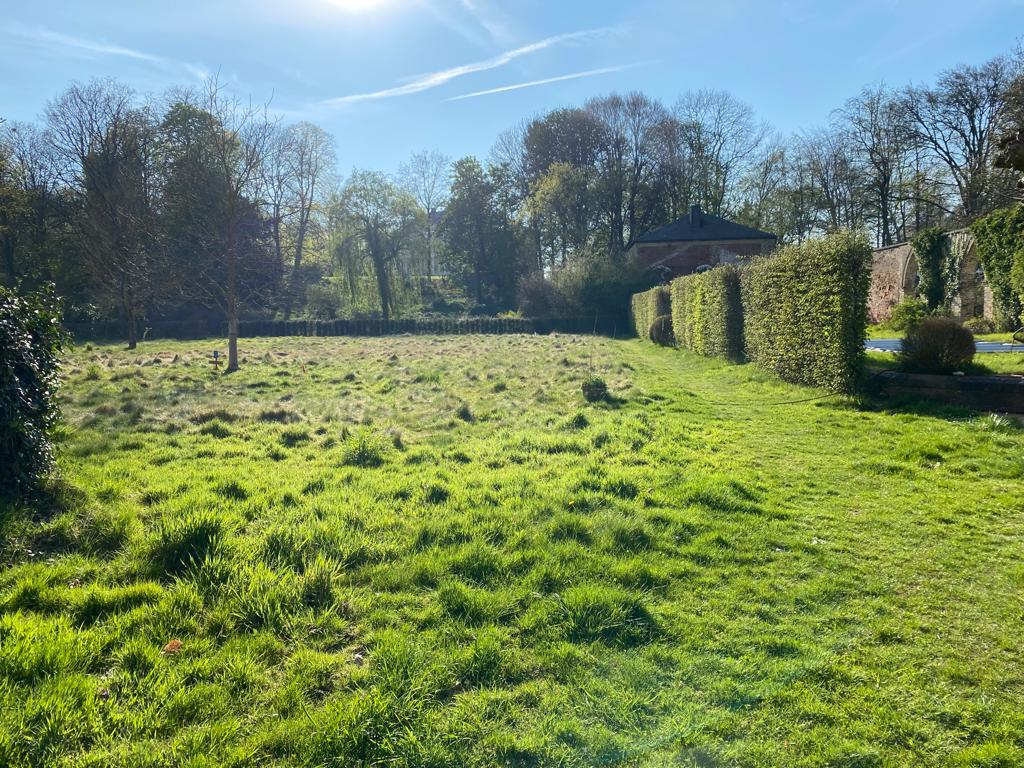
Another view of the park of Les Orangeries de Bierbais, 2022.

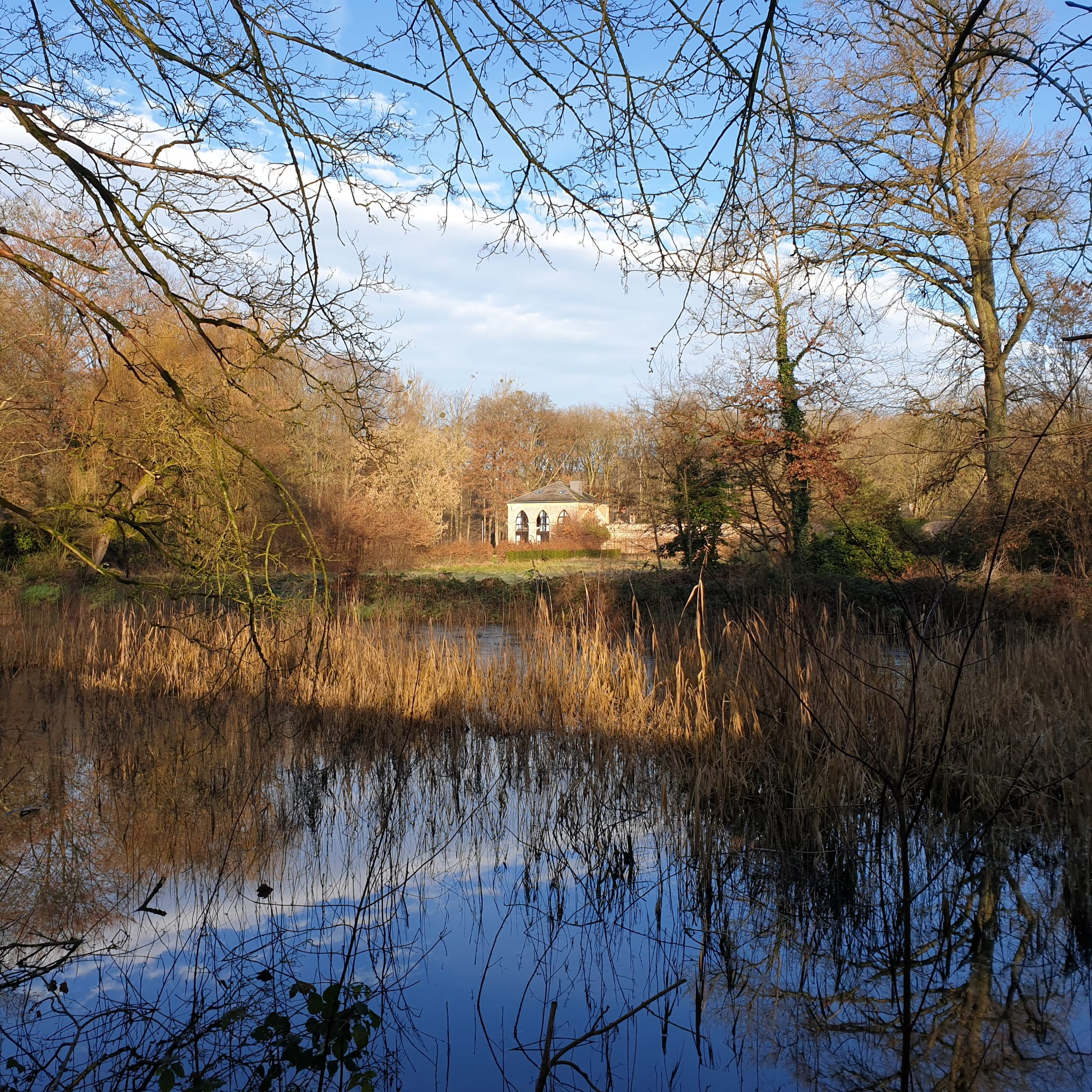
Small lake and west orangeries.

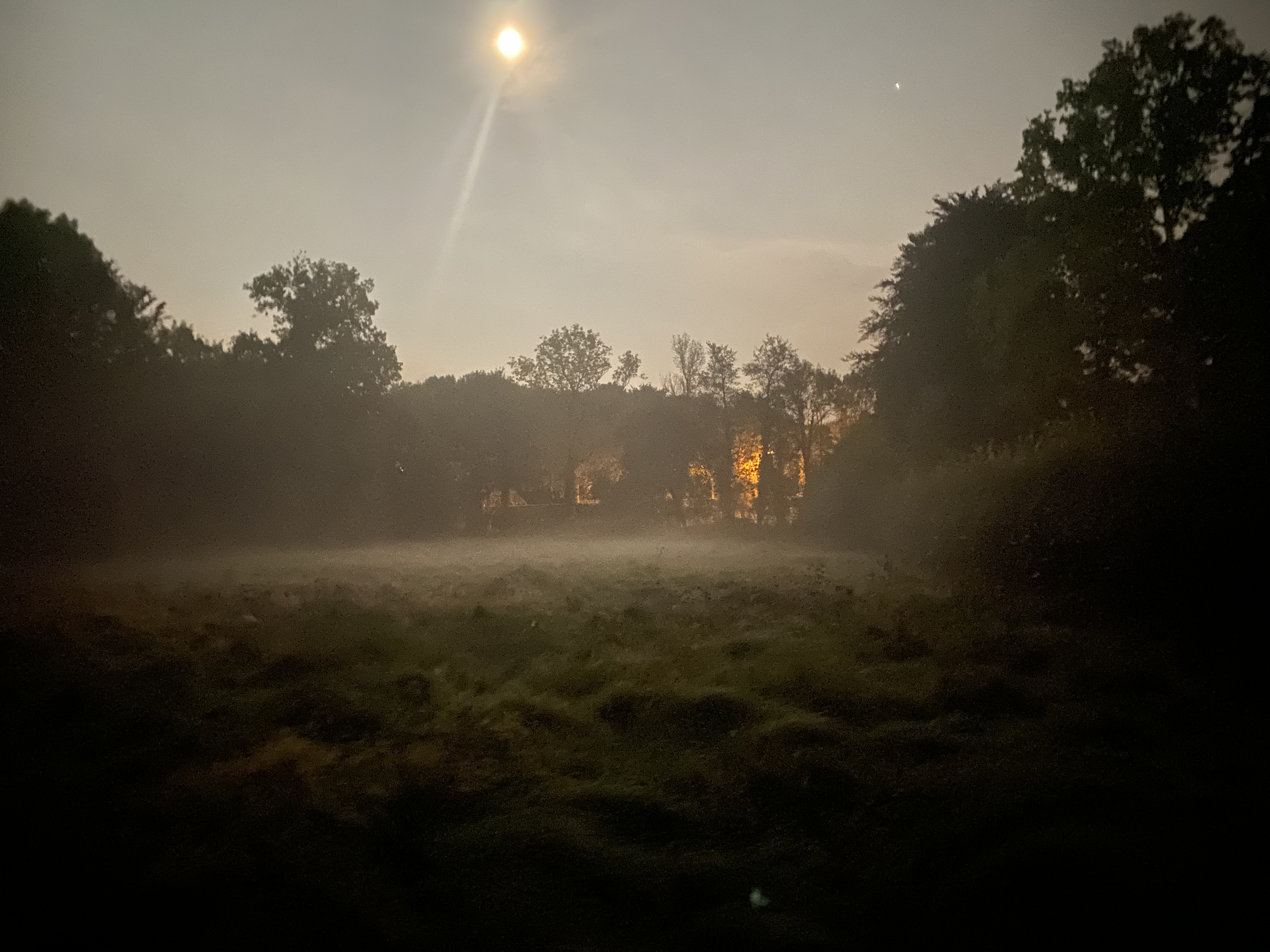
Sunset at Les Orangeries de Bierbais, 2022.

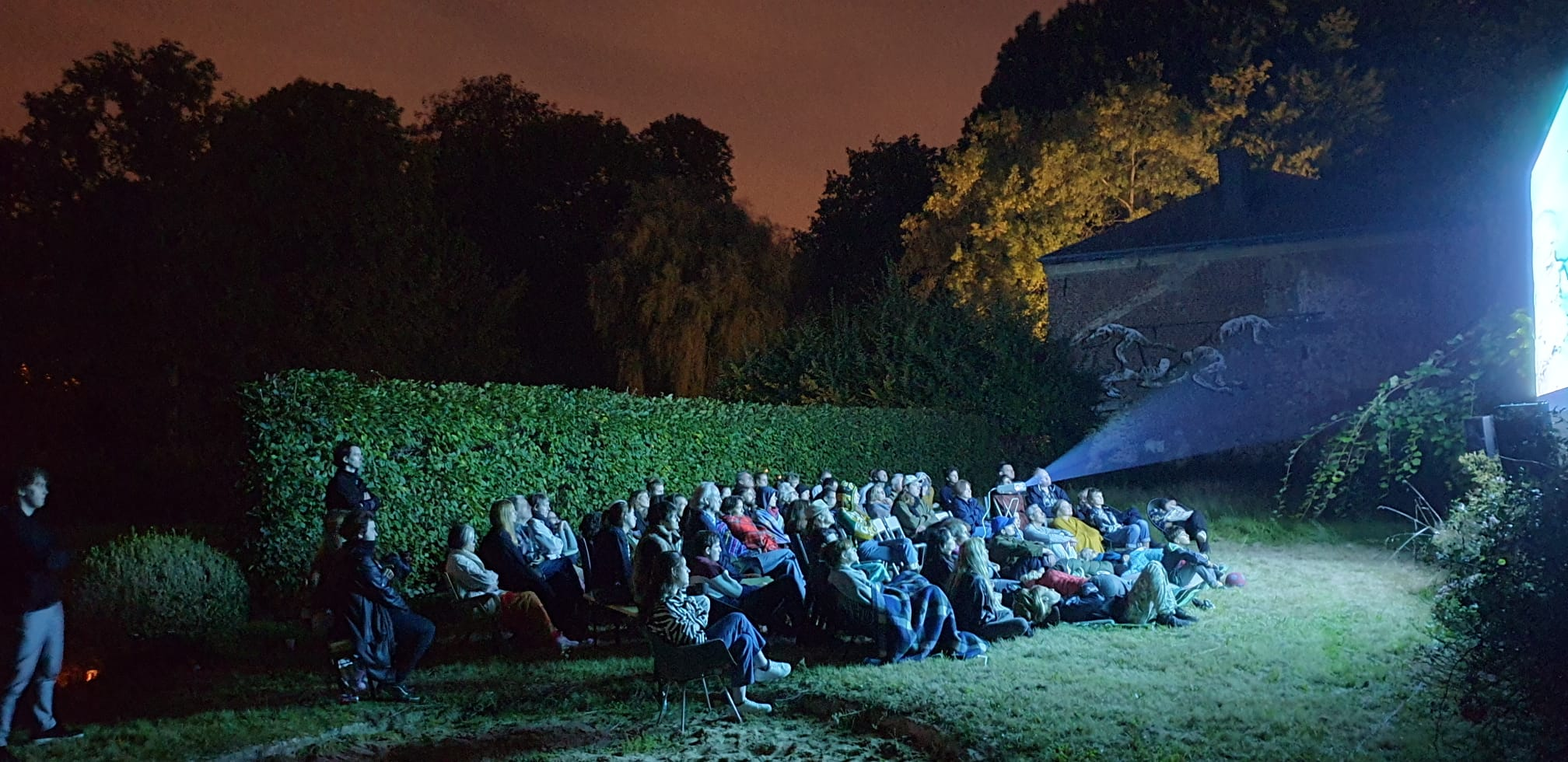
Cinema screening at Les Orangeries de Bierbais.

== Bibliography ==
- Joseph Decaisne (1850). "Construction et chauffage des serres". Figures pour l'almanach du bon jardinier. Paris: Dusacq. p. 127.
- Joseph Henri François Neumann (1846). Art de construire et de gouverner les serres. Audot. pp. 106–107. Joseph Henri François Neumann
- Philippe-Victoire Lévêque de Vilmorin; Joseph Decaisne; et al. (1845). Revue horticole : journal d'horticulture practique. Librairie Agricole de la Maison Rustique. p. 77.

== See also ==
- Charles-Henri Petersen
- Botanical Garden of Brussels
- Mariemont, Belgium
