= Charles-Henri Petersen =

German/Dutch architect (1792–1859)

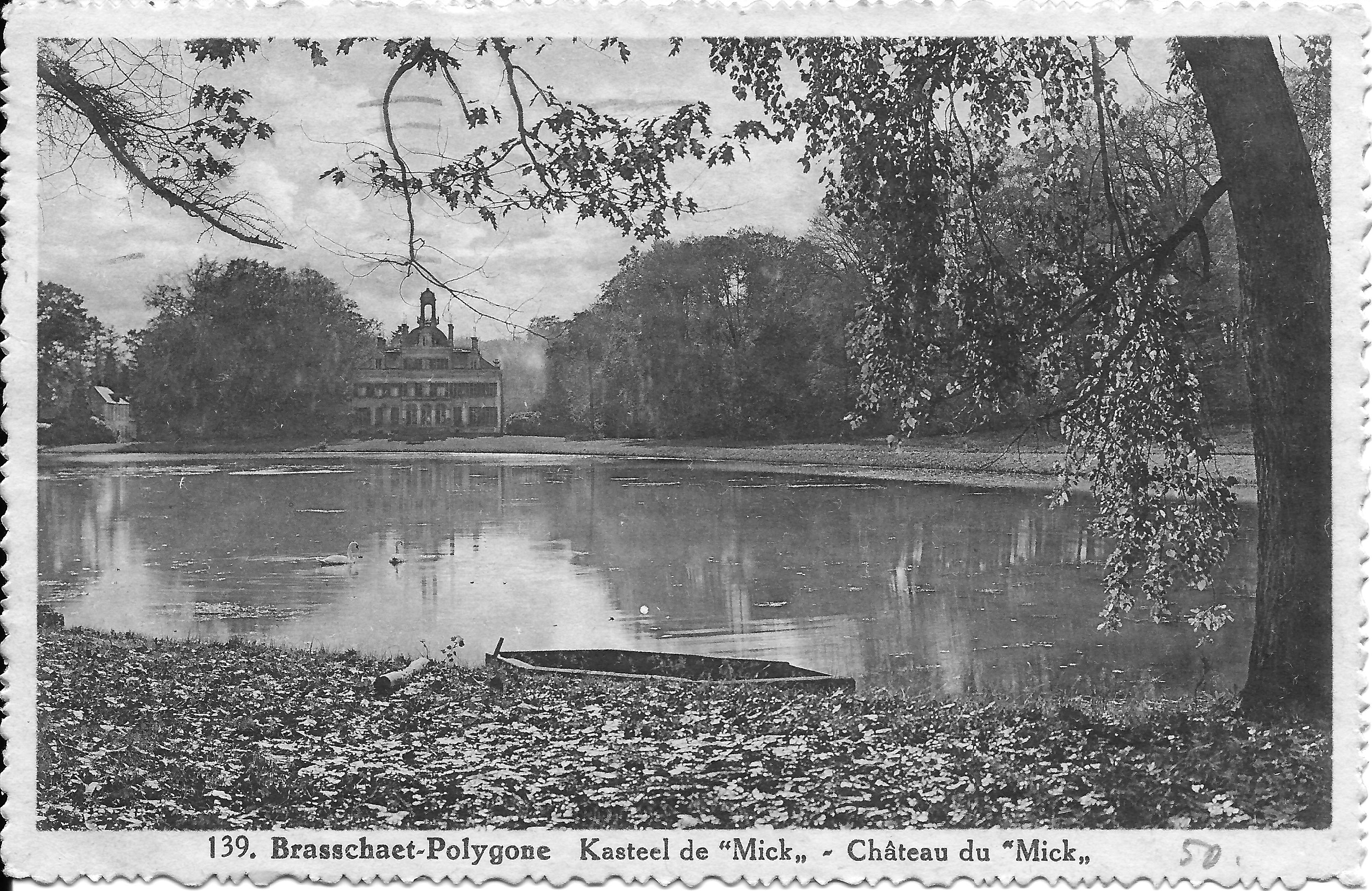
view of lake at Hof ter Mik

Charles-Henri Petersen, born Carl Heinrich Petersen (1792-1859), was a German paysagist architect from Altenburg, Saxe. Around 1820, he moved to Belgium, where many of his works still exist. The importance of his interventions in parks and gardens, at the time of the nascent Belgium, made him a defender of "English-style" gardens and a pioneer in the design of monumental greenhouses with a European reputation, starting with the one built in the Parc de Bierbais (1828), where Petersen lived until his death on December 2, 1859.

== Works ==
- The park around the château de Bierbais, including the ancient monumental greenhouses, nowadays known as Les Orangeries de Bierbais, 1828 (pour C.J.G. de Man de Lennick)
- Botanical Garden of Brussels, opened in 1829 (reworked bur Jean-Baptiste Meeus-Wouters)
- Hof ter Mick at Brasschaat, 1830
- The park around the château de Leut, 1830 (in English style, only partially done)
- Park of the Domaine de Mariemont, 1832
- The park around the château de Merode in Westerlo, 1834 (plans executed in 1870)

=== See also ===
- Mariemont, Belgium
- Orangeries de Bierbais
