= Le Botanique =

Cultural complex and music venue in Brussels, Belgium

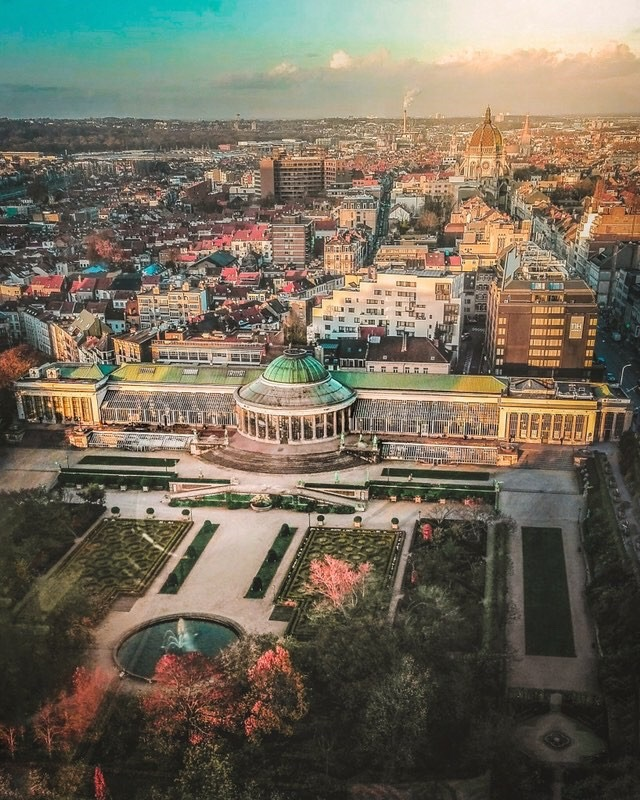
- Aerial view of Le Botanique
- Interactive map of Le Botanique
- Address: Rue Royale / Koningsstraat 236; 1210 Saint-Josse-ten-Noode, Brussels-Capital Region; Belgium
- Coordinates: 50°51′17″N 4°21′55″E
- Type: Performing arts centre

Construction
- Opened: 1984

Le Botanique (French pronunciation: [lə bɔtanik]) is a cultural complex and music venue in Saint-Josse-ten-Noode, Brussels, Belgium. The building was previously the main orangery of the National Botanic Garden of Belgium and even as part of the garden had hosted cultural events. In 1958, the National Botanic Garden moved to Meise, Flemish Brabant. Le Botanique opened in 1984, and the gardens in front are now the Botanical Garden of Brussels.

== Cultural centre ==
Since 1984, Le Botanique has been the cultural centre for the French Community of Belgium. Until 2017, it managed the concert agenda for the nearby Cirque Royal, an entertainment venue able to hold seated audiences of 2,000, and more standing.

Nowadays, Le Botanique features a busy schedule of concerts, most taking place in either the 650-capacity orangery, the tall, circular rotunda with space for 300, or the vaulted Witloof Bar with 200 standing places. Other rooms in the building are typically used for art exhibitions or film screenings.

The annual Les Nuits Botanique ("The Botanical Nights") festival, held during the spring, sees a large number of musicians performing. In addition to the regular rooms, a marquee is frequently erected in the garden.

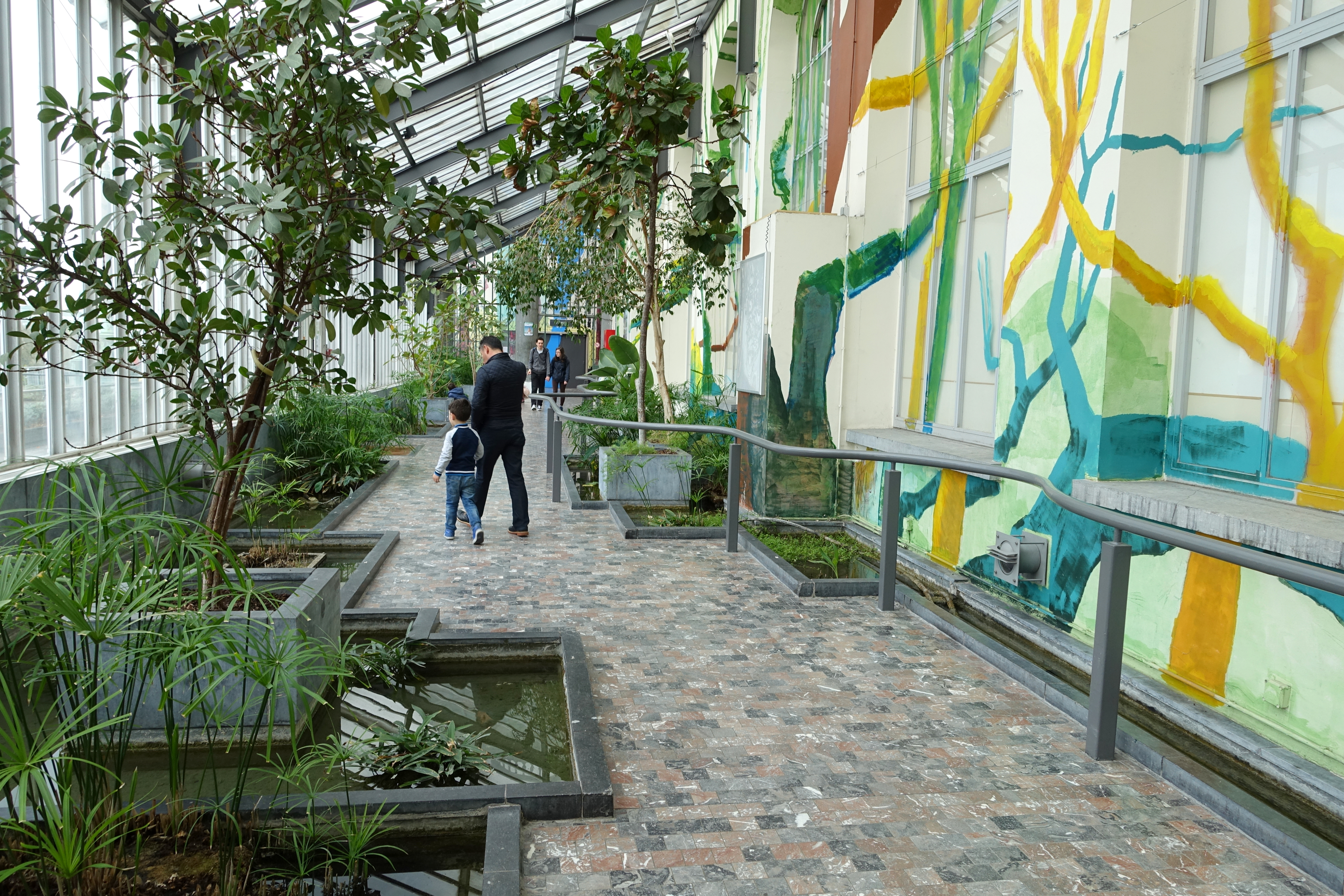
Inside the rotunda

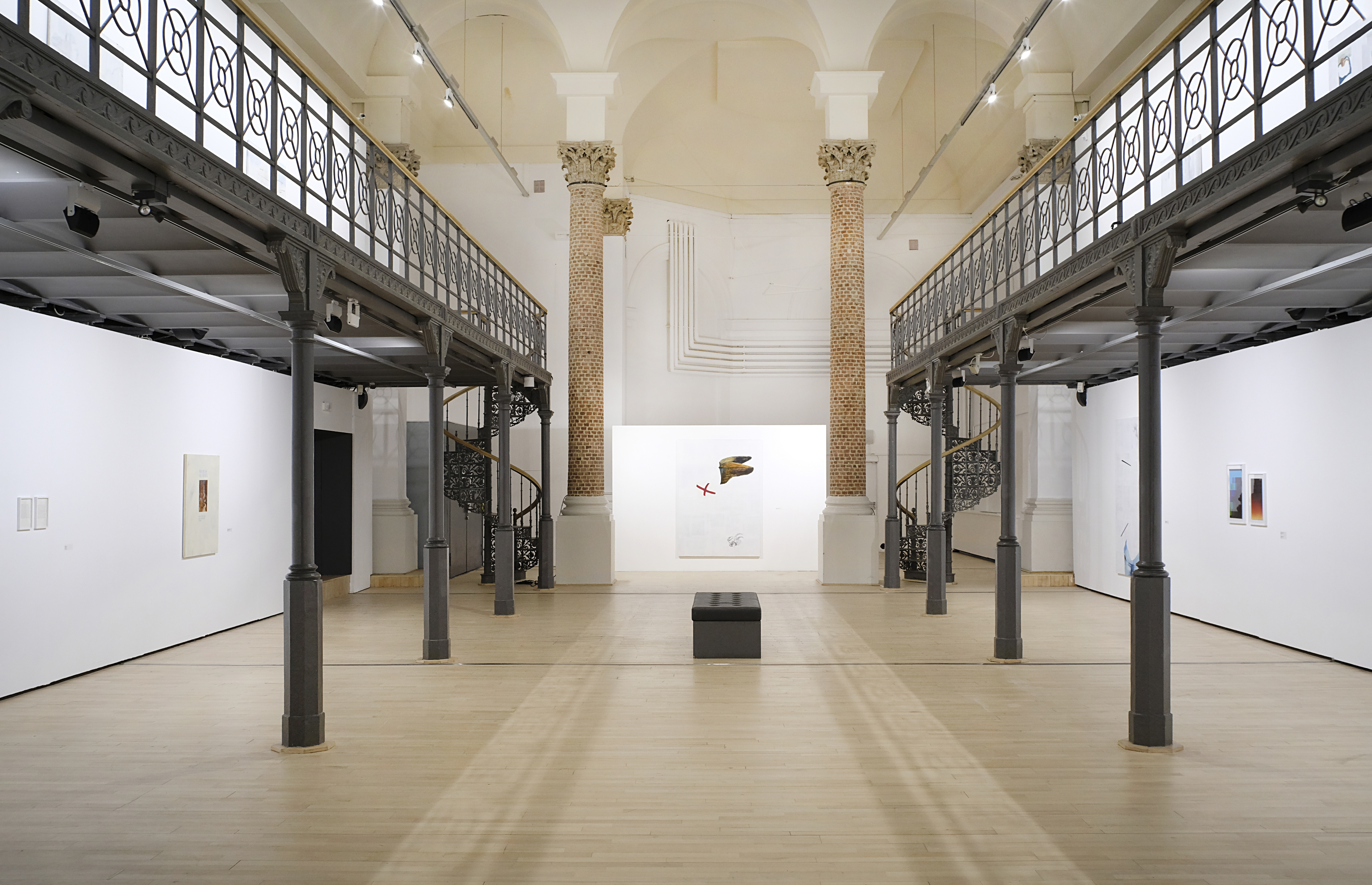
Museum

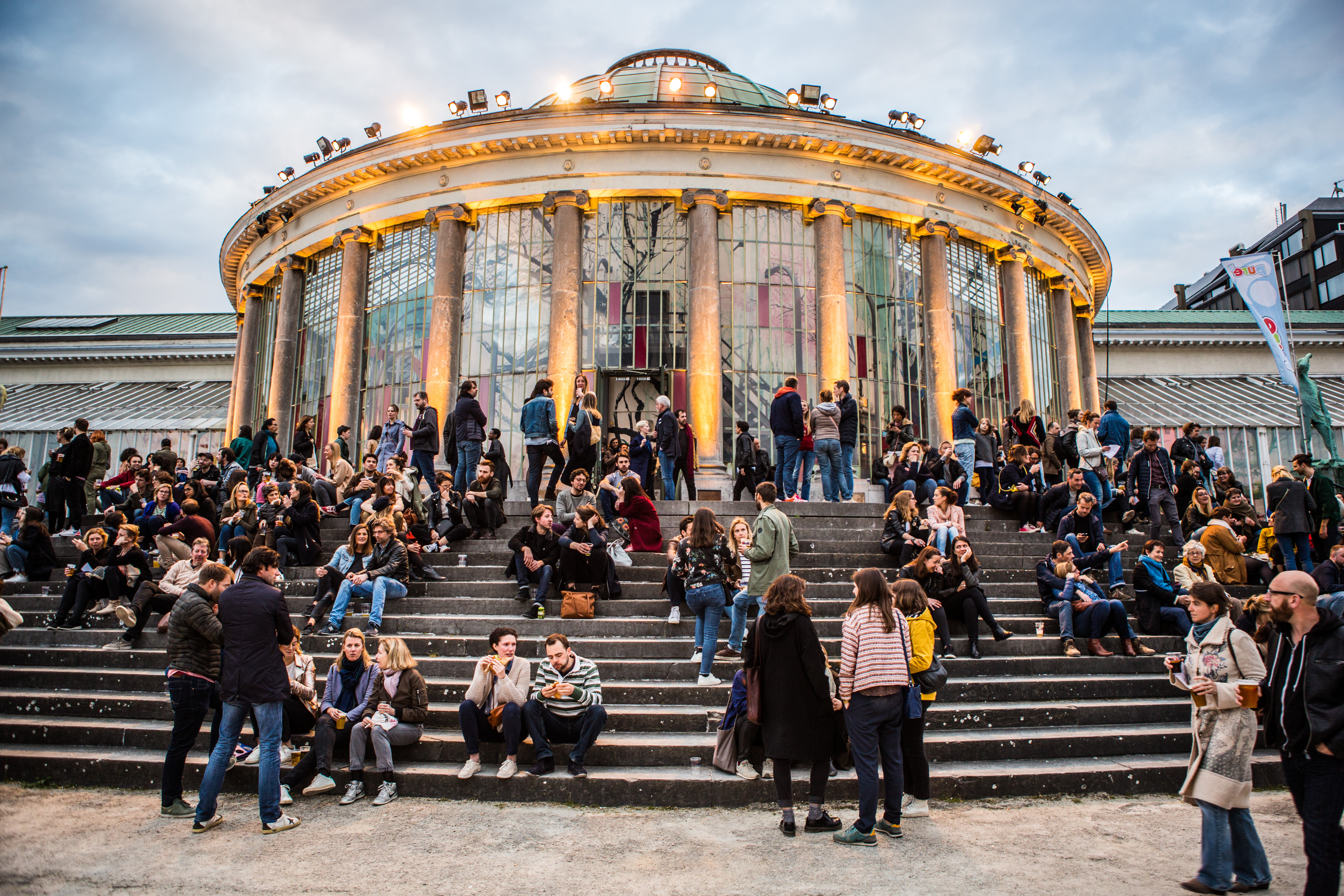
Les Nuits Botanique

== See also ==
- List of concert halls
- History of Brussels
- Culture of Belgium
- Belgium in the long nineteenth century
