= Botanical Garden of Brussels =

Former botanical garden in Saint-Josse-ten-Noode, Belgium

- Jardin botanique de Bruxelles (French); Kruidtuin van Brussel (Dutch)
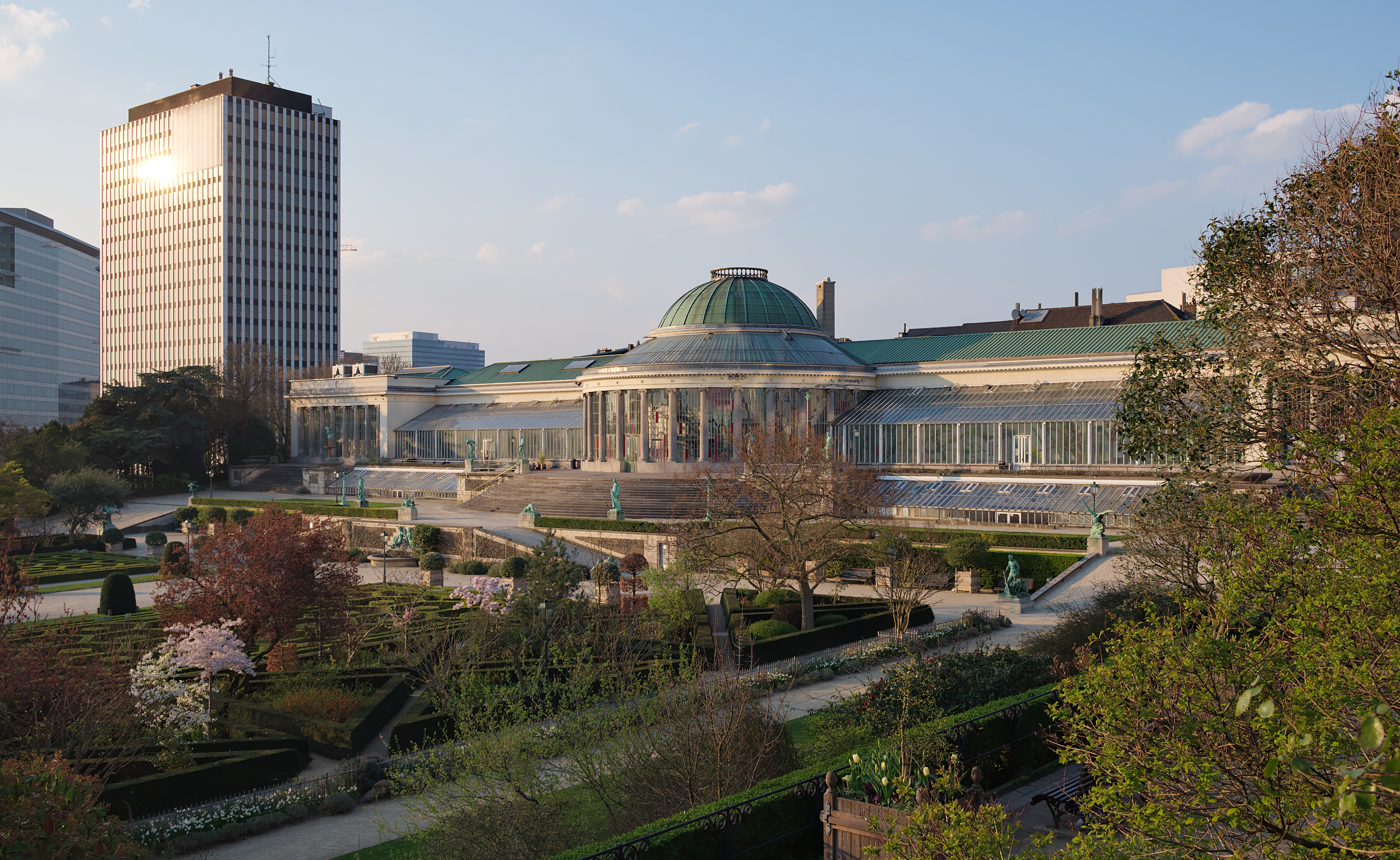
- Botanical Garden of Brussels' main building, Le Botanique
- Interactive map of Botanical Garden of Brussels
- Type: Public park
- Location: Saint-Josse-ten-Noode, Brussels-Capital Region, Belgium
- Coordinates: 50°51′18″N 4°21′55″E
- Created: 1826
- Status: Open year-round
- Public transit: Brussels-North; 2 6 Botanique/Kruidtuin

The Botanical Garden of Brussels (French: Jardin botanique de Bruxelles, pronounced [ʒaʁdɛ̃ bɔtanik də bʁysɛl]; Dutch: Kruidtuin van Brussel, pronounced [ˈkrœytœyn vɑm ˈbrʏsəl]) is a former botanical garden in Brussels, Belgium. It was created in 1826 and stood on the Rue Royale/Koningsstraat in Saint-Josse-ten-Noode, near Brussels' Northern Quarter financial district, until its relocation in 1938 to the National Botanic Garden of Belgium in Meise, Flemish Brabant.

Since 1984, the main orangery building has been a cultural complex and music venue of the French Community of Belgium known as Le Botanique.

== History ==
=== Origins (c. 1797–1830) ===
A first plant garden (French: Jardin des plantes, Dutch: Plantentuin) had existed since the French rule of Belgium in 1797, at a different location, along Brussels' first wall, in the Hôtel de Nassau—a building belonging to the former Palace of Coudenberg where the École Centrale of the department of the Dyle was established—and in its garden. The collection of native and exotic species quickly attracted interest, but due to the growth of the city and the threat of destruction of the city walls, this garden had to be relocated to its current area near the Northern Quarter.

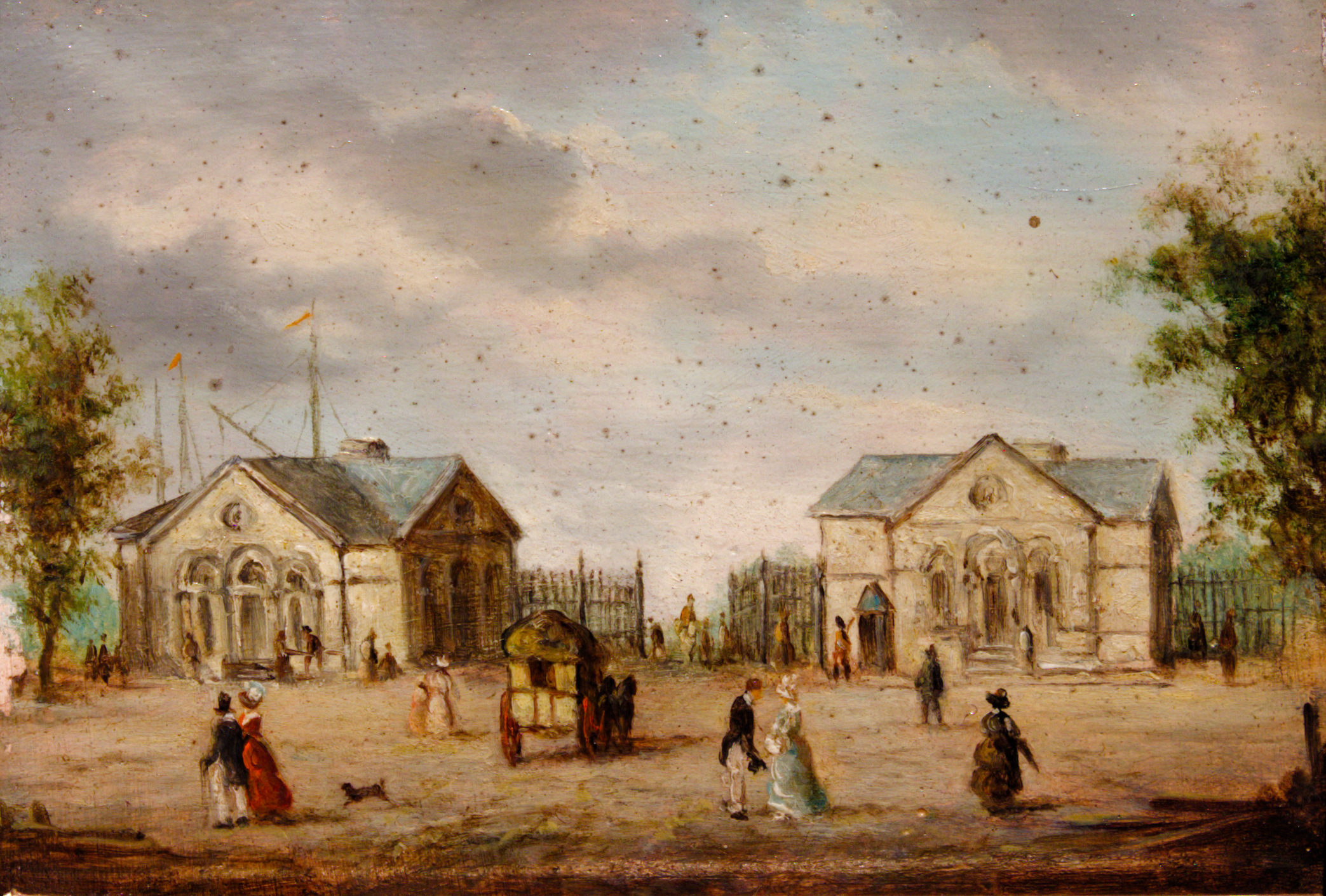
The Botanical Garden, Paul Vitzthumb, 1828

In 1815, Belgium became part of the United Kingdom of the Netherlands. In 1826, five notable botany enthusiasts acquired a suitable wooded lot of 6 hectares (15 acres), in what was then a suburban town north of the city, to create an ensemble housing the already existing collections of plants. The Royal Horticultural Society of the Netherlands (French: Société royale d'Horticulture des Pays-Bas, Dutch: Koninklijke Maatschappij van Kruid, Bloom, en Boom Kweekerij, der Nederlanden) was born. Although it was rooted on a private enterprise, it was also intended to be a national institution dedicated to science and botanical studies.

The botanical building was partly designed by the architect Tilman-François Suys and the construction works, carried out between 1826 and 1829, were directed by the decorative artist Pierre-François Gineste. The original gardens were the work of the German landscape gardener Charles-Henri Petersen, later reorganised on the instructions of one of the founders of the Horticultural Society, Jean-Baptiste Meeus-Wouters. The orangery with greenhouses, aquarium, and gardens, was officially inaugurated with fireworks, celebrations and a banquet, from 1 to 3 September 1829, for the first exhibition of horticultural products organised by the Royal Horticultural Society of the Netherlands.

=== Post-independence (1830–1930) ===
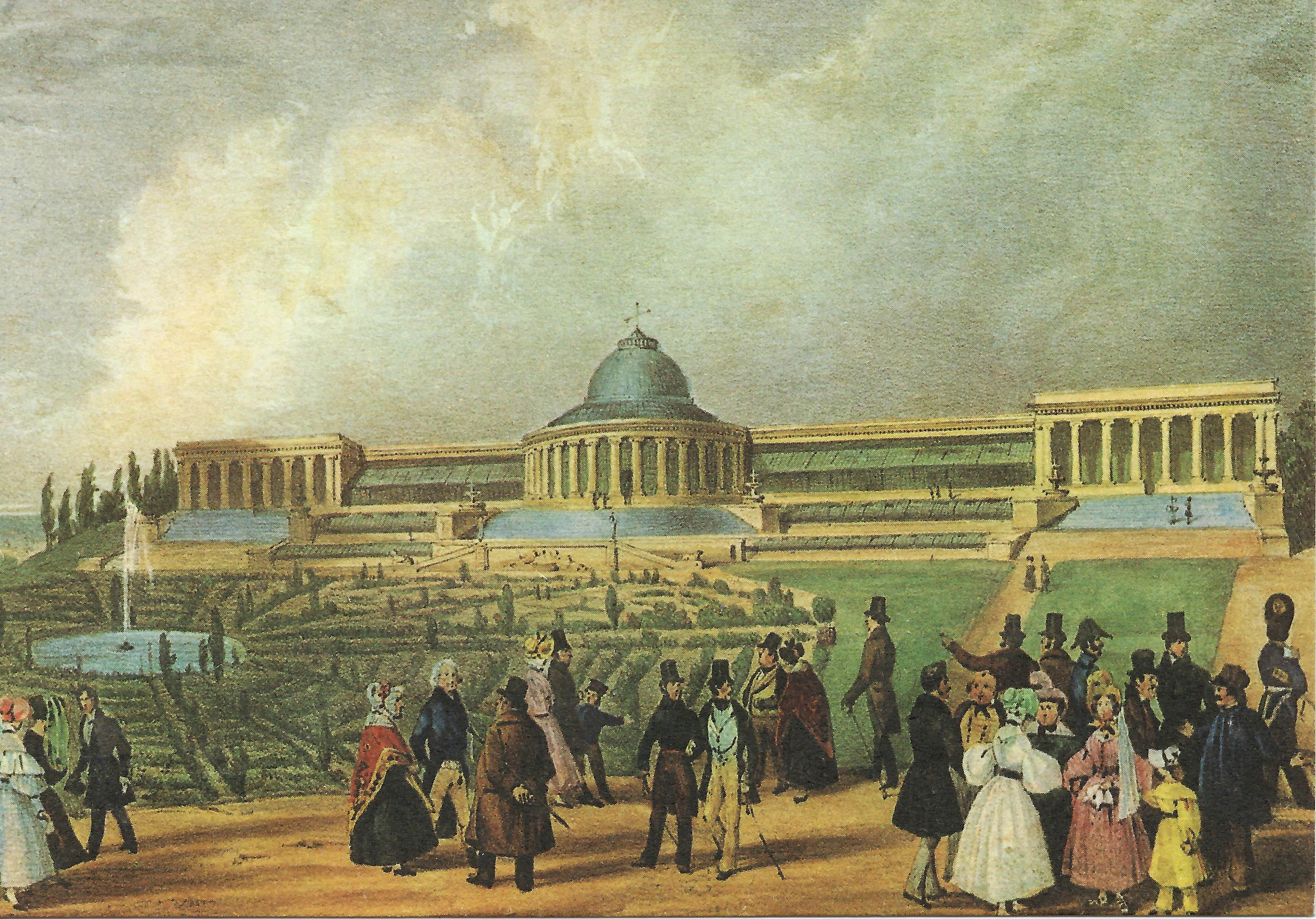
The Botanical Garden in the mid-19th century

At the country's independence in 1830, the institution became the Royal Horticultural Society of Belgium (French: Société royale d'Horticulture de Belgique, Dutch: Koninklijke Maatschappij van Kruid, Bloom, en Boom Kweekerij, der België). The Botanical Garden was in dire need of funds, and a plant trade was thus established at the orangery in 1835, with various vegetables and mushrooms being cultivated in the basement. This would accidentally lead to the birth of the Belgian endive by the head gardener Frans Bresiers. Between 1842 and 1854, the orangery and garden were enlarged in several phases, including the construction of a portal on the Rue Royale. Thoughts also soon turned to the possibility of hosting parties in the building, and a hall was developed for this purpose between the eastern orangery and the rotunda. However, this space became the herbarium from 1870 onwards.

After decades of financial uncertainty, the Belgian state finally bought the garden in 1870, in order to protect the panorama and to safeguard both the scientific objective of the Botanical Garden and its status as a public pedestrian park. Between 1894 and 1898, the authorities commissioned various fountains, electrical lighting, and the addition of numerous sculptures, in order to both beautify the park and stimulate public art and artists in the country. The decorations, rock formations, and conservatory, for example, date from that period. Exotic plants were an attraction at that time because many inhabitants hardly travelled. All through the 19th century, the park was a popular recreational area for the bourgeoisie. Victor Hugo, during his first stay in Brussels in 1852, wrote:

Brussels has two unique wonders in the world: the Grand Place and the panorama of the Botanical Garden.

=== Contemporary (1930–present) ===
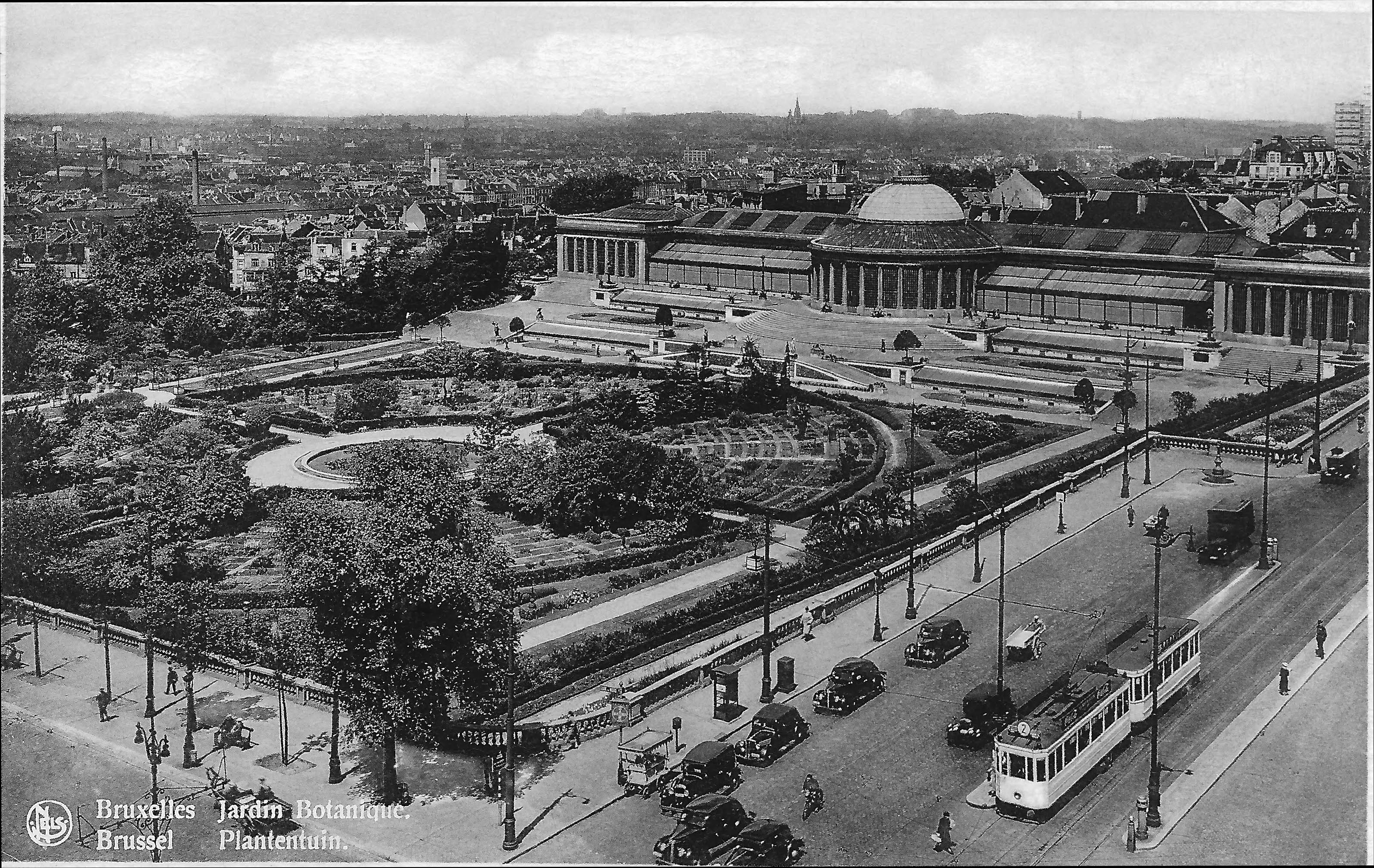
The Botanical Garden in the 1930s

During the 1930s, the works of the North–South connection did not spare the Botanical Garden, and it was decided to entirely move the botany institution to a larger site. In 1938, most of the botanical resources were relocated to the new National Botanic Garden of Belgium in Meise, on the outskirts of today's Brussels-Capital Region. From April 1940, the plants from the outdoor collection were moved, followed by the trees and shrubs, and finally the large greenhouse, which was reassembled in Meise. The old garden was reduced in size and made into a park after part of its western premises were used to facilitate the reconfiguration of the Boulevard Saint-Lazare/Sint-Lazaruslaan, a north–south road-viaduct that cuts the garden in two, as well as the widening of the Rue Gineste/Ginestestraat.

For the 1958 Brussels World's Fair (Expo 58), the landscape architect René Pechère redesigned the garden, dividing it into three separate terraces with a mixture of styles (French, English and Italian). His intention was to preserve the broad outline of the former structure and the remarkable trees and to blend them harmoniously with the new architecture of the buildings in the area. He also laid the foundation for the new function as a public city garden. Despite this, the urbanisation of the district, the arrival of the metro, and the nearby construction of the State Administrative Centre (an administrative complex in the International Style) gradually led to the park's decline.

The whole site was designated on 15 April 1964. Since its reallocation in 1984, the original botanical building now stands as a cultural centre for the French Community of Belgium called Le Botanique, while its historical statues, and its remarkable collection of species of large trees, remains intact. Since 1991, when the management of the Botanical Garden was transferred to the Brussels-Capital Region, the gradual restoration of the garden has continued.

== Building ==
The main orangery building (Le Botanique) is one-story high and its south-facing neoclassical façade is preceded by two terraces. It consists of a central rotunda with a dome, and is flanked by two wings lined with windows, each ending in a slightly offset pavilion with Ionic columns. Access to the first terrace is done from the garden via four ramps: two facing the side pavilions and two others, converging, facing the rotunda. In addition, two straight lateral staircases and a central convex staircase lead to the second terrace. Greenhouses are attached to the two side wings. Others are located below the level of the second terrace, between the stairs giving access to it.

Though it has been transformed to meet its new function as a cultural centre (including concert halls and showrooms), the interior of the building retains most of its original appearance. The former herbarium room in the west wing was transformed into a cafeteria, and the two pavilions into the entrance hall and a multipurpose room. The transit between the different rooms is done through the former greenhouses attached to the side wings and the rotunda.

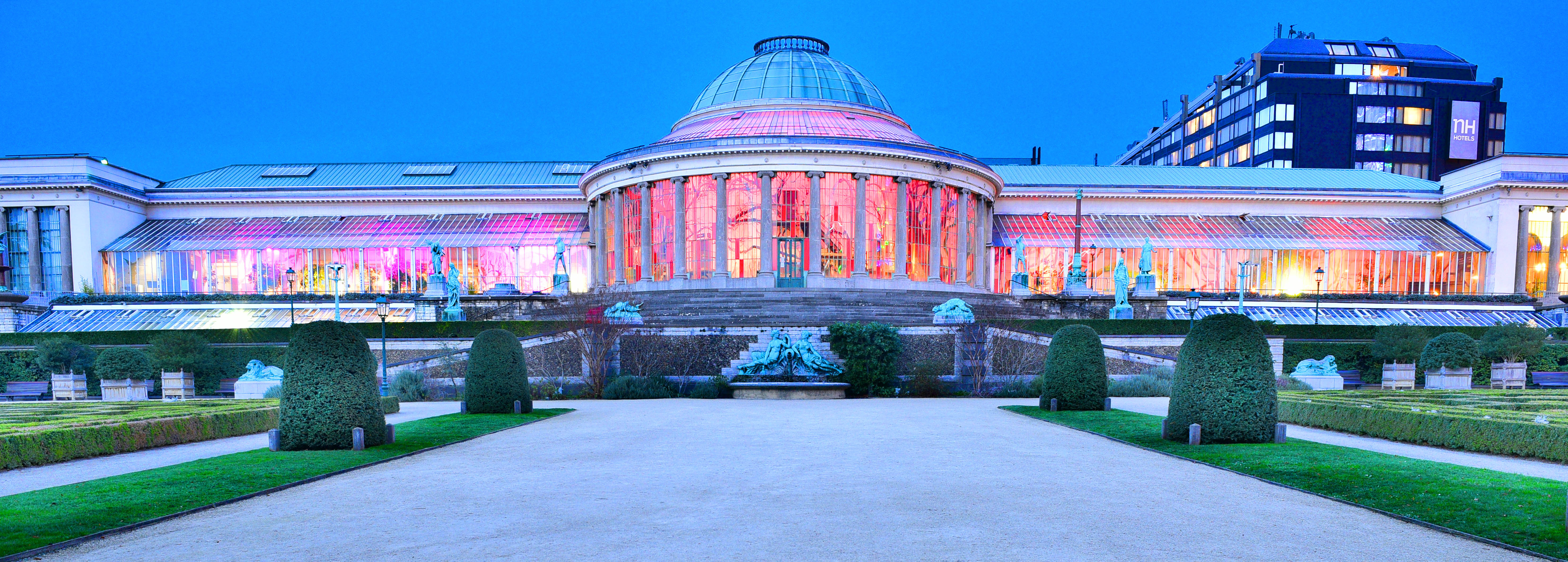
The main orangery building, with sculptures in the foreground

== Gardens ==
Heavily damaged by work on the North–South connection, the gardens, as they appear today, are the work of the landscape architect René Pechère. The French-style formal garden, planted with flowering shrubs, is laid out in front of the cultural centre's greenhouses and orangery. The middle section, inspired by Italian designs, features a star-shaped rose garden and a flowerbed containing forty different species of iris. The third, lower section of the park is designed in the style of an English landscape garden, with winding pathways, ornamental lakes and shrub-lined lawns.

== Sculptures ==
Fifty-two sculptures were executed between 1894 and 1898, a project overseen by two well-known sculptors: Constantin Meunier and Charles van der Stappen. The sculptures portray allegorical figures of plants, animals, and seasons. Some of the 43 sculptors involved include Albert Desenfans, Julien Dillens, Paul Du Bois, Jules Lagae, Léon Mignon, Victor Rousseau, François Rude, and Charles Samuel.

Botanical Garden's sculptures

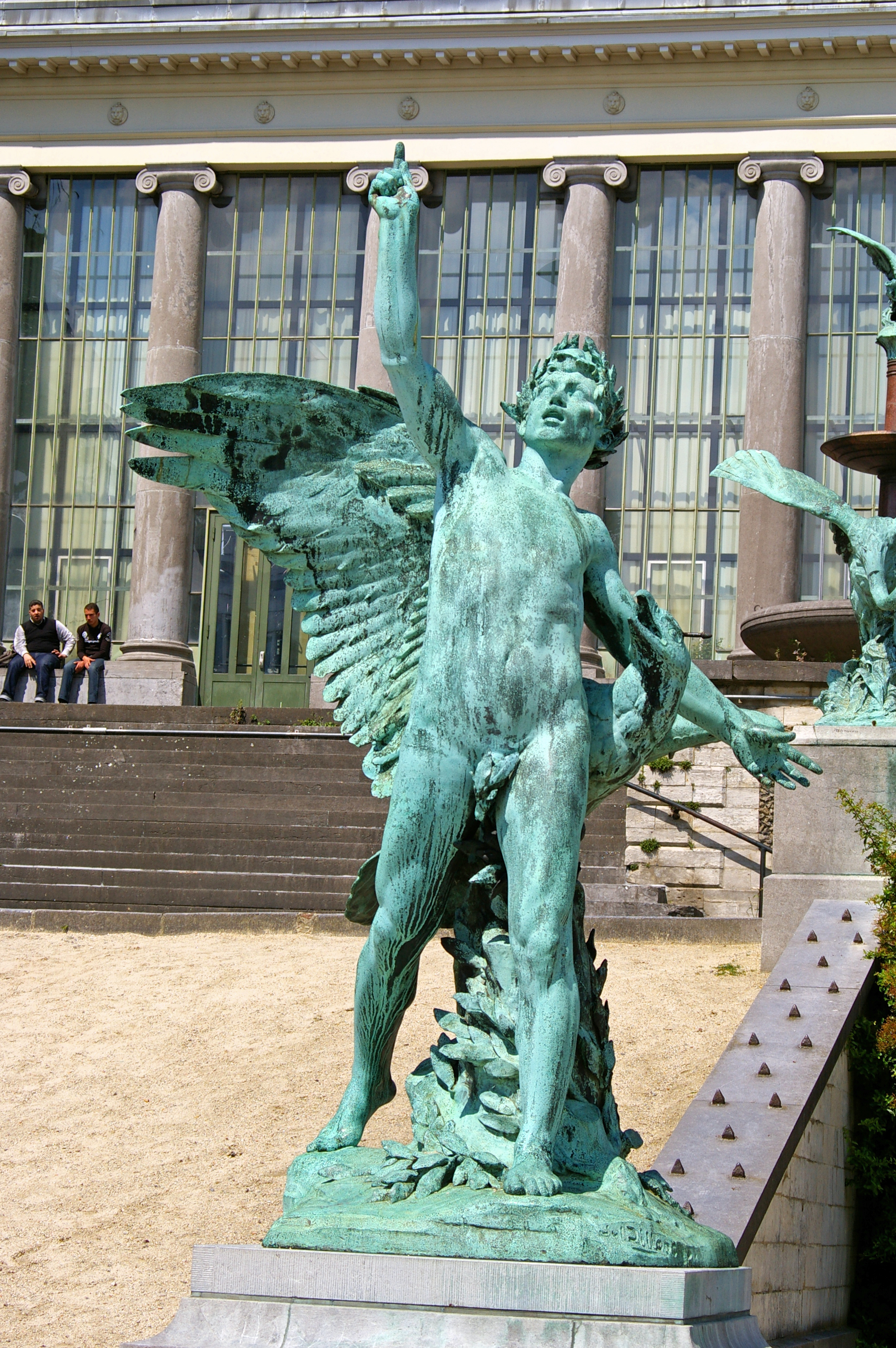
The Laurel (or Fame) by Julien Dillens

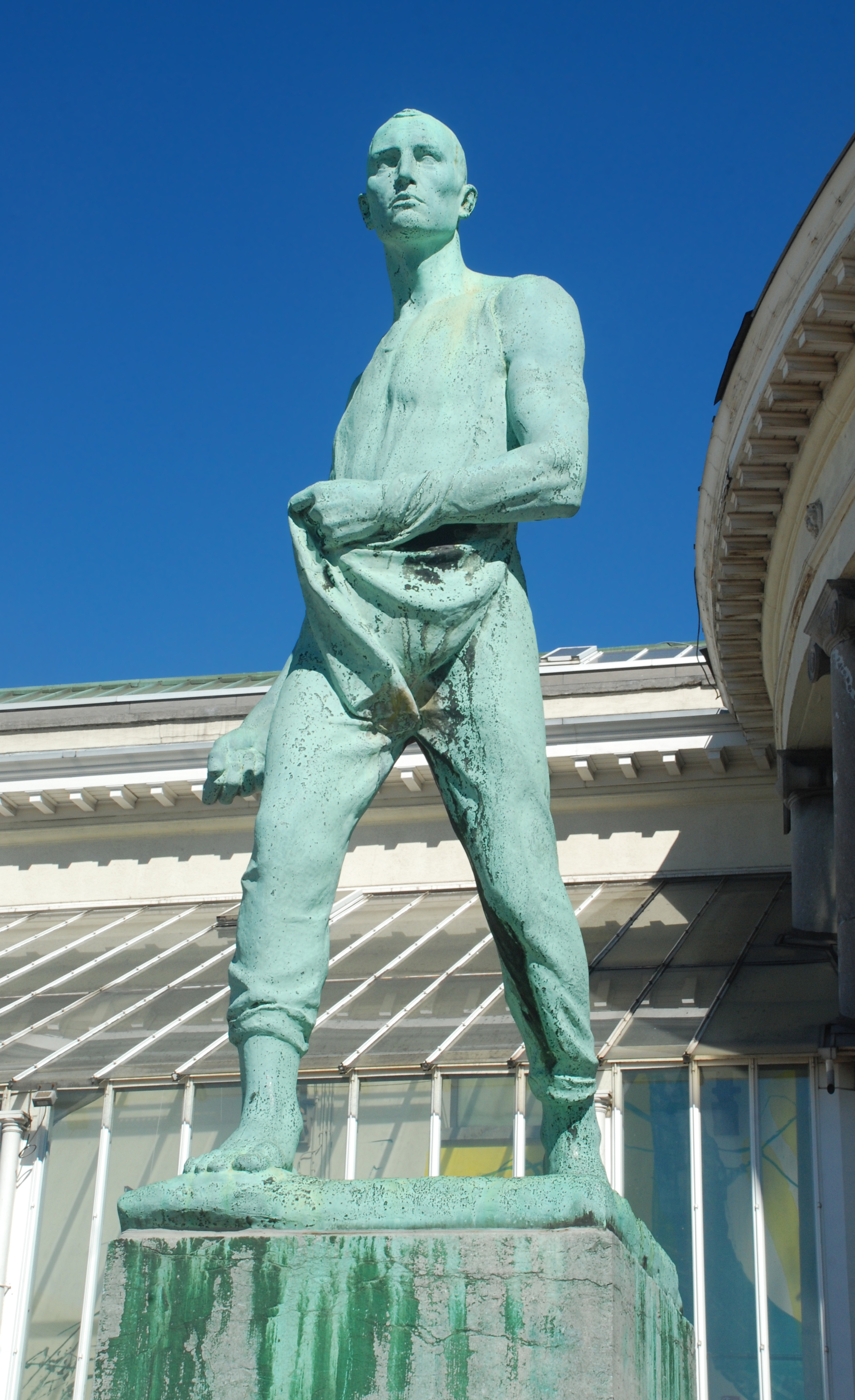
Autumn (or The Sower) by Constantin Meunier

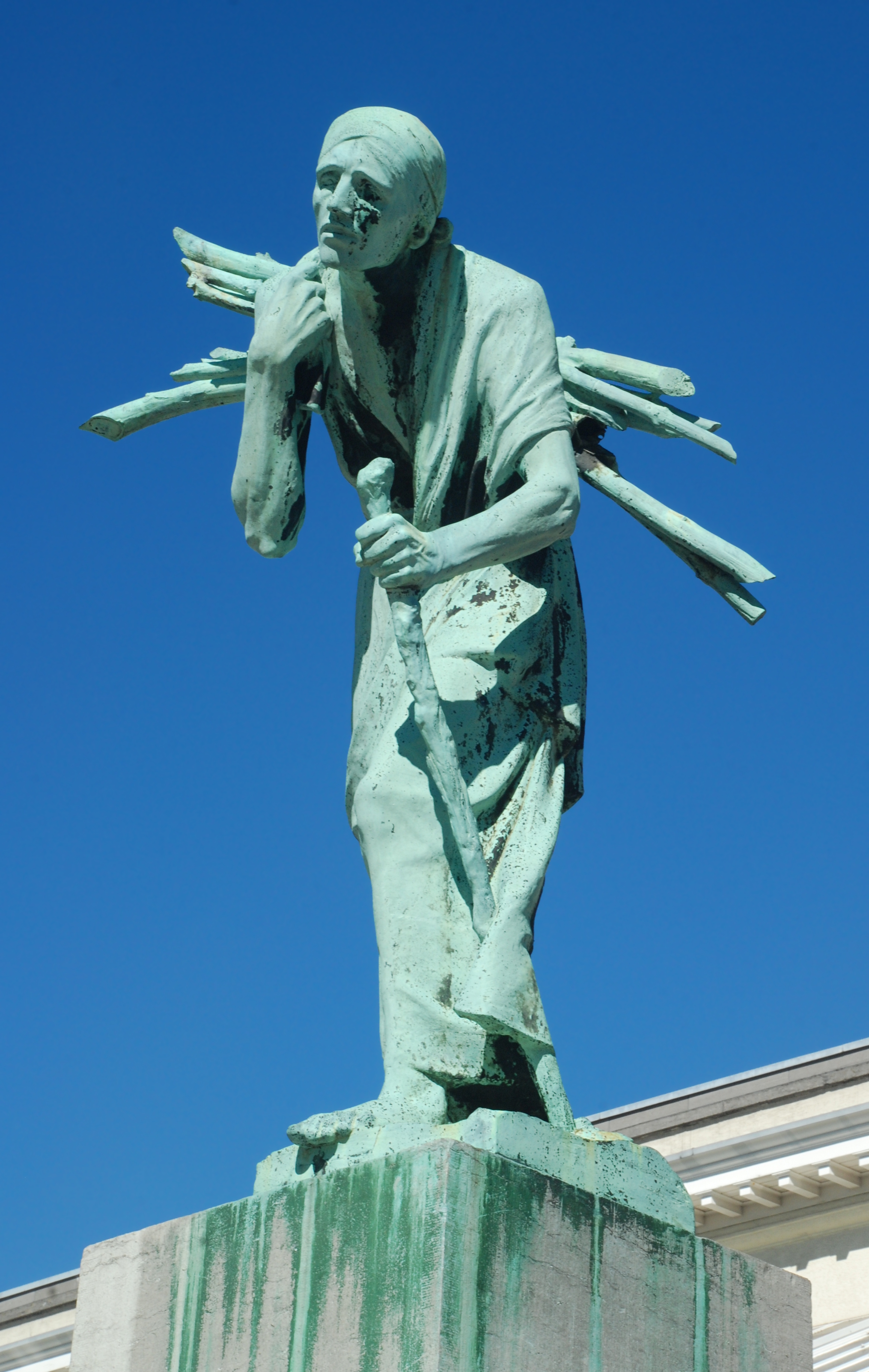
Winter (or The Old Lumberjill) by Pierre-Jean Braecke

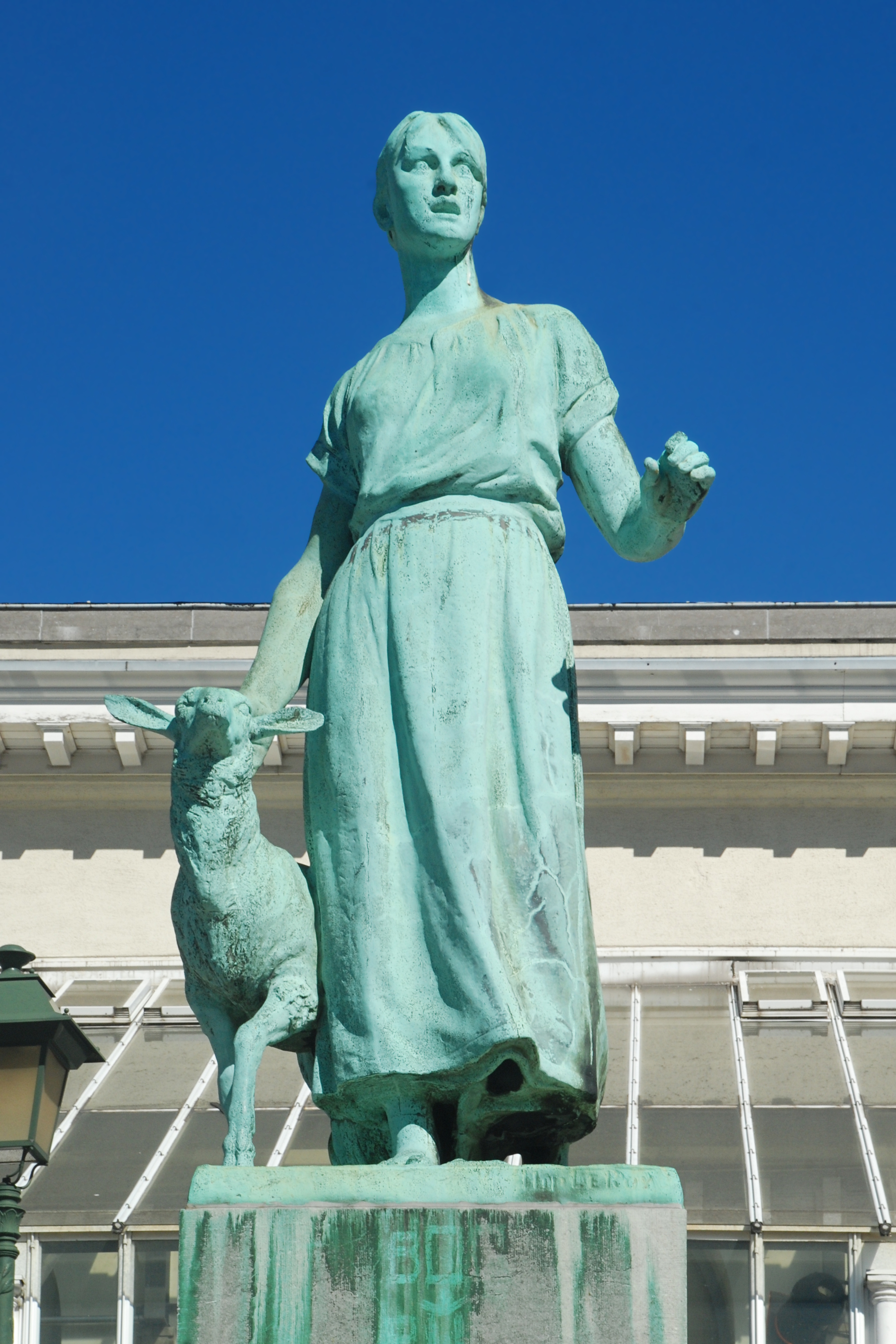
Spring (or The Shepherdess) by Hippolyte Leroy

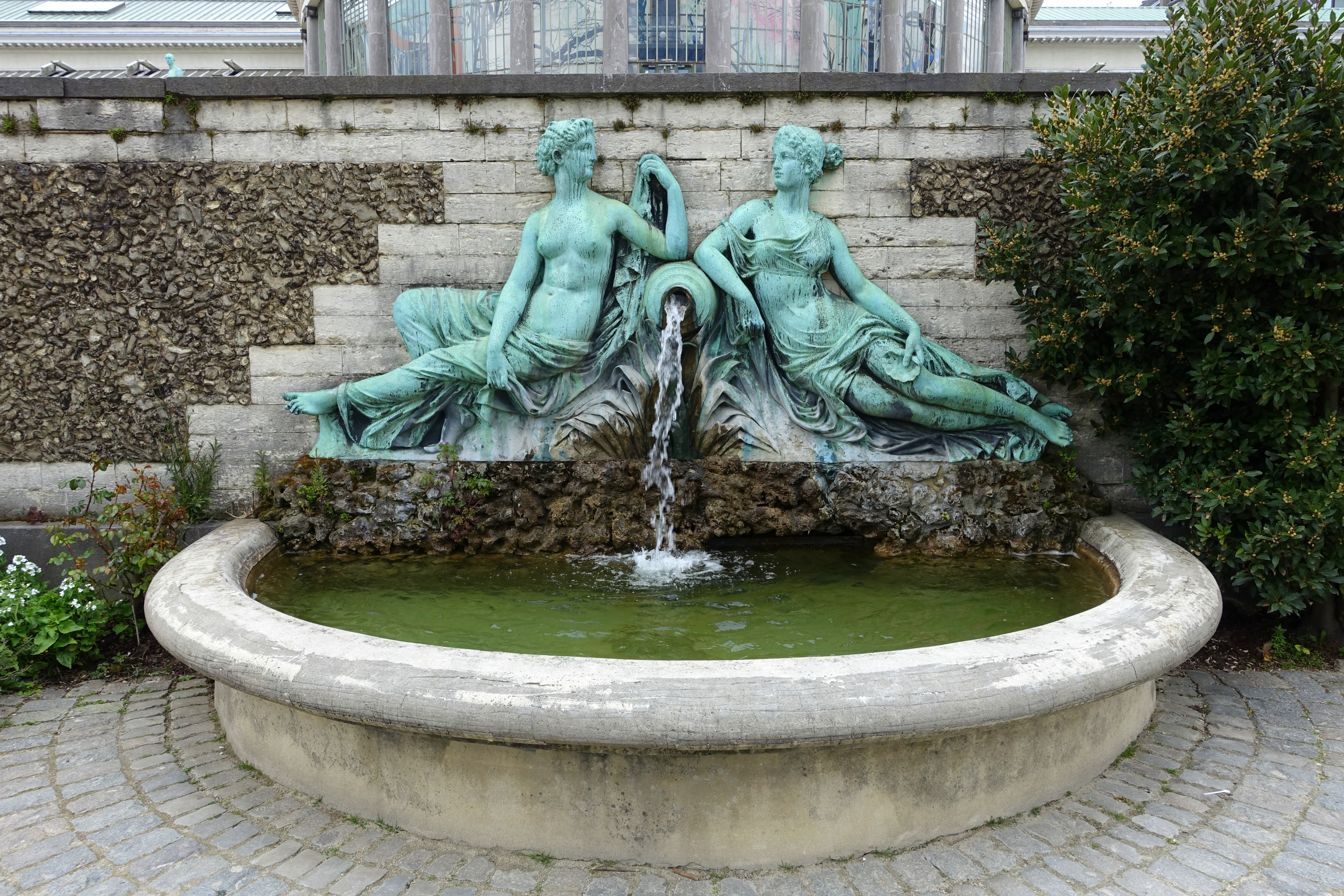
Two nymphs surrounding a source by Albert Hambresin (1890), original by François Rude (1826)

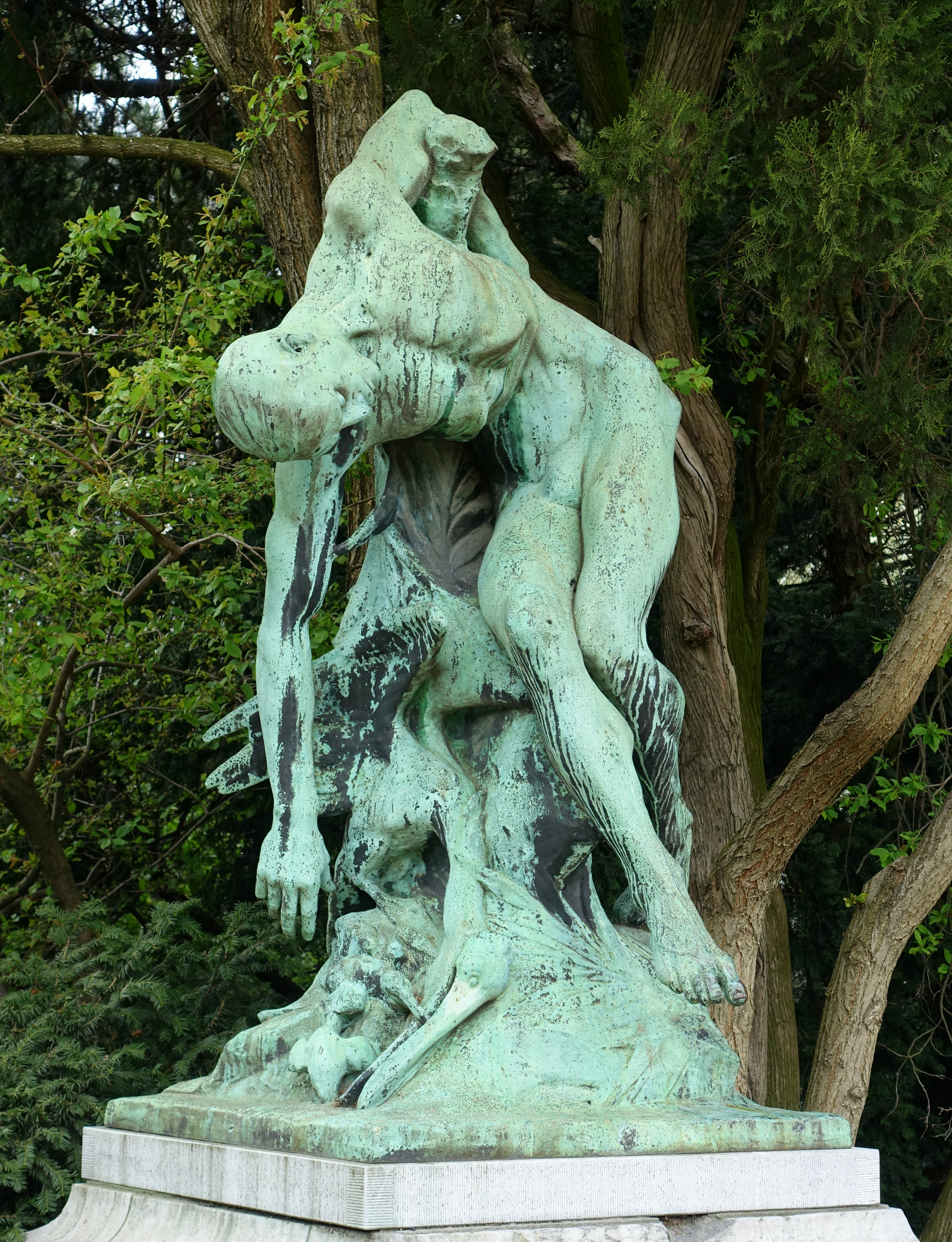
The Palm Tree by Victor De Haen

== Remarkable trees ==
Below are some of the Botanical Garden's remarkable trees listed by the Monuments and Sites Commission:

English name	Latin name	cir. in cm
Oriental plane	Platanus orientalis	450
London plane	Platanus × hispanica	447
Horse-chestnut	Aesculus hippocastanum	330
Eastern black walnut	Juglans nigra	281
Honey locust	Gleditsia triacanthos var. inermis	248
Maidenhair tree	Ginkgo biloba	241
Red horse-chestnut	Aesculus × carnea	241
Narrow-leafed ash	Fraxinus angustifolia	227

== See also ==
- Les Orangeries de Bierbais
- List of parks and gardens in Brussels
- History of Brussels
- Belgium in the long nineteenth century
