= Saccolabium =

Scientific classification
- Kingdom: Plantae
- Clade: Tracheophytes
- Clade: Angiosperms
- Clade: Monocots
- Order: Asparagales
- Family: Orchidaceae
- Subfamily: Epidendroideae
- Tribe: Vandeae
- Subtribe: Aeridinae
- Genus: Saccolabium; Blume

Type species
- Saccolabium pusillum Blume

Genus of orchids

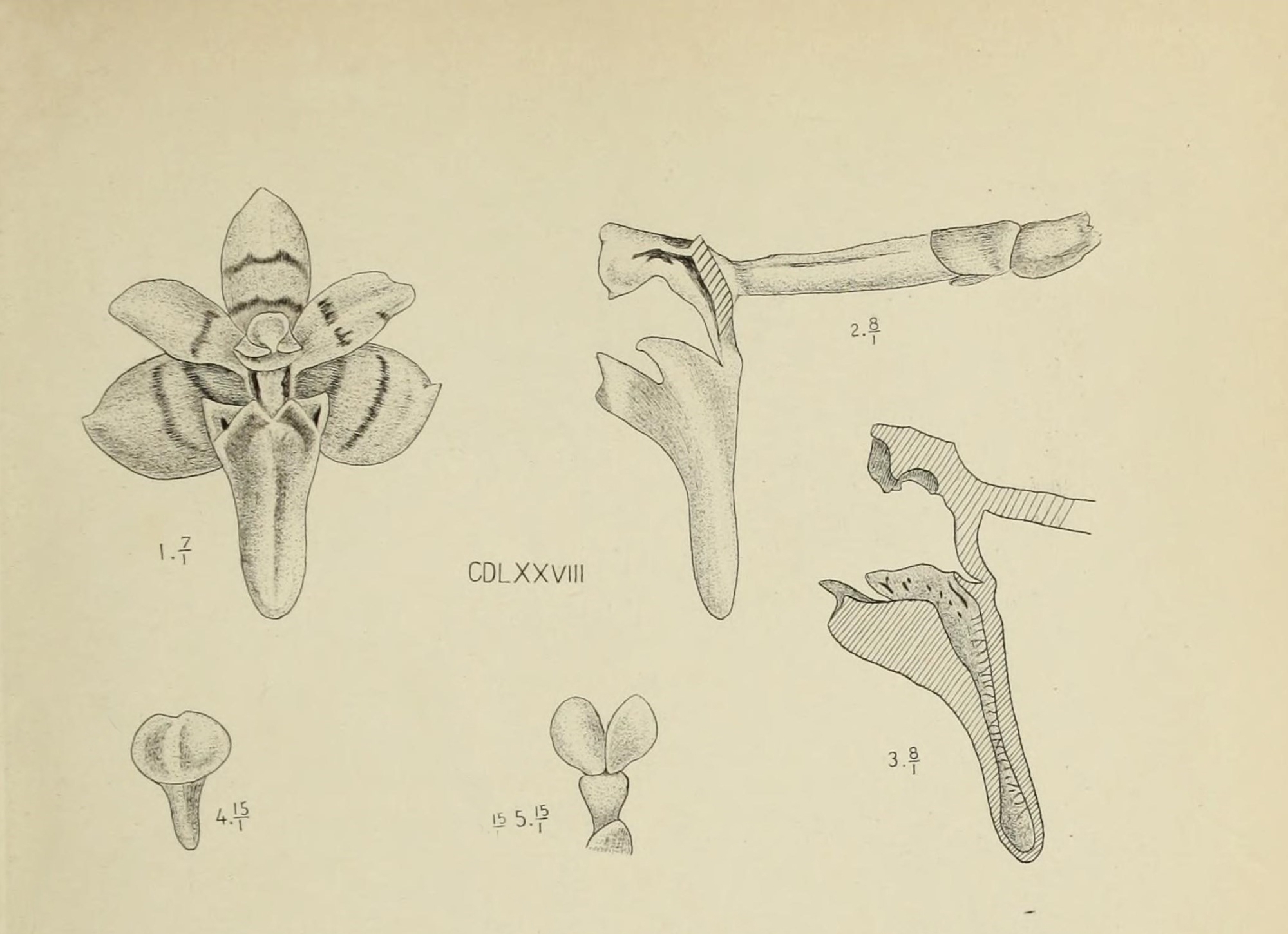

Saccolabium is a genus of flowering plants from the orchid family, Orchidaceae. It is native to India and Indonesia. In the past, over 350 names have been published for species, subspecies and varieties within the genus, but the vast majority of the taxa have been moved to other genera. At present (June 2014), the following are accepted in Saccolabium:

- Saccolabium congestum (Lindl.) Hook.f. - India
- Saccolabium longicaule J.J.Sm. - Java
- Saccolabium pusillum Blume - Java, Sumatra
- Saccolabium rantii J.J.Sm. - Java
- Saccolabium sigmoideum J.J.Sm. - Java

== See also ==
- List of Orchidaceae genera
