= Brussels Metro =

Rapid transit system in Brussels, Belgium

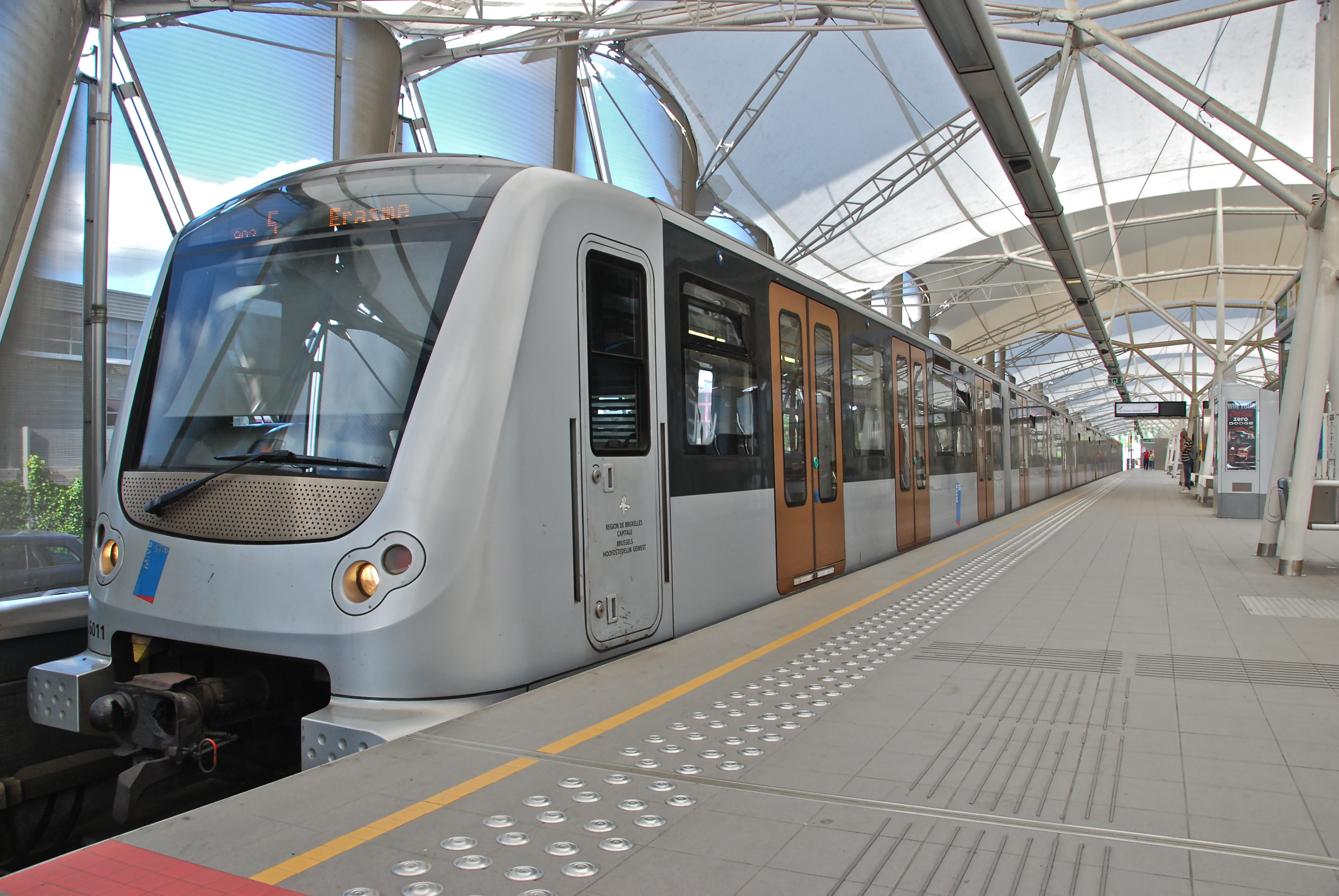
- Brussels Metro train (M6 "Boa" series) at Erasme/Erasmus metro station

Overview
- Native name: Métro de Bruxelles (French); Brusselse metro (Dutch)
- Locale: Brussels-Capital Region
- Transit type: Rapid transit
- Number of lines: 4 metro lines (M1, M2, M5, M6); 3 premetro lines (T4, T7, T10)
- Number of stations: 59 (metro only); 69 (with premetro)
- Annual ridership: 129.2 million (2022)
- Website: www.stib-mivb.be/home

Operation
- Began operation: 20 September 1976; 50 years ago
- Operator: STIB/MIVB
- Number of vehicles: 66

Technical
- System length: 39.9 km (24.8 mi) (metro only); 55.7 km (34.6 mi) (with premetro)
- Track gauge: 1,435 mm (4 ft 8 1/2 in) standard gauge
- Electrification: 900 V DC third rail
System map
Key
Line 1	Line 2	Line 5	Line 6	multiple lines	premetro

The Brussels Metro (French: Métro de Bruxelles [metʁo də bʁysɛl]; Dutch: Brusselse metro [ˈbrʏsəlsə ˈmeːtroː]) is a rapid transit system serving a large part of the Brussels-Capital Region of Belgium. It consists of four conventional metro lines and three premetro lines. The metro-grade lines are M1, M2, M5, and M6 with some shared sections, covering a total of 39.9 kilometres (24.8 mi), with 59 metro-only stations. The premetro network consists of three tram lines (T4, T7, and T10) that partly travel over underground sections that were intended to be eventually converted into metro lines. Underground stations in the premetro network use the same design as metro stations. A few short underground tramway sections exist, so there is a total of 52.0 kilometres (32.3 mi) of underground metro and tram network. There are a total of 69 metro and premetro stations as of 2011.

The Brussels Metro was planned at the beginning of the 1960s to become a fully underground network. The original network, running between De Brouckère and Schuman, was inaugurated on 17 December 1969 as premetro tramways, which were later, in 1976, converted into the common section of the first two metro lines. These lines were then considered a single line with two branches, between De Brouckère and Tomberg and De Brouckère and Beaulieu. On 4 April 2009, with the completion of the "loop" of line 2 connecting Delacroix and Gare de l'Ouest/Weststation, the Brussels Metro was significantly reorganised.

The Brussels Metro is administered by the Brussels Intercommunal Transport Company (STIB/MIVB). In 2011, it was used for 125.8 million journeys, and it was used for 138.3 million journeys in 2012. It is also an important means of transport, connecting with six railway stations of the National Railway Company of Belgium (NMBS/SNCB), and many tram and bus stops operated by STIB/MIVB, as well as with Flemish De Lijn and Walloon TEC bus stops. Additionally, some metro stations offer suburban railway links as part of the Brussels Regional Express Network (RER/GEN) system.

On 22 March 2016, Maelbeek/Maalbeek metro station was bombed, killing about 20 people and injuring 106. The Islamic State of Iraq and the Levant (ISIL) claimed responsibility.

== History ==
Development of the Brussels Metro up to 2006

=== Early history ===
The Brussels Intercommunal Transport Company (French: Société des Transports Intercommunaux de Bruxelles or STIB, Dutch: Maatschappij voor het Intercommunaal Vervoer te Brussel or MIVB) was created in 1954. The first underground tramway (or premetro) line was built between 1965 and 1969, from Schuman to De Brouckère. In 1970, a second line was opened, between Madou and Porte de Namur/Naamsepoort. An underground station at Diamant was opened in 1972 and the Greater Ring line was extended from Diamant to Boileau in 1975. This underground tramway section has not been developed further, and it is used by tramway lines 7 and 25. Rogier station was inaugurated in 1974.

=== Opening and extensions ===
On 20 September 1976, the first metro line opened. One branch went from De Brouckère to Beaulieu (in Auderghem), and the other one linked De Brouckère with Tomberg (in Woluwe-Saint-Lambert). The same year, the North–South Axis (premetro) was opened between Gare du Nord/Noordstation (Brussels-North Station) and Lemonnier. In 1977, two new stations were built; Sainte-Catherine/Sint-Katelijne, which replaced De Brouckère as the last western stop in the City of Brussels, and Demey, which replaced Beaulieu as the last stop of the southern branch.

The next extension was the opening of stations in Molenbeek-Saint-Jean (Beekkant, the new terminus, Etangs Noirs/Zwarte Vijvers and Comte de Flandre/Graaf van Vlaanderen). In 1982, line 1 was split into line 1A from Bockstael (in Laeken, a former municipality now merged with the City of Brussels) to Demey (Auderghem) and line 1B from Saint-Guidon/Sint-Guido (in Anderlecht) to Alma (at the Université catholique de Louvain (UCLouvain) campus in Woluwe-Saint-Lambert). Three years later, line 1A was extended to Heysel/Heizel (near the site of the 1958 World's Fair and the Heysel Stadium) at one end and to Herrmann-Debroux at the other. That year also saw the opening of Veeweyde/Veeweide on line 1B, and Louise/Louiza on the premetro line under the Small Ring (from Louise/Louiza to Rogier).

This line was extended to Simonis the next year and opened as metro line 2 in 1988, from Simonis to Gare du Midi/Zuidstation (Brussels-South Station). Crainhem/Kraainem and Stockel/Stokkel also opened that year on line 1B. At the other end of this line, Bizet opened in 1992. It was then the turn of line 2 to reach Clemenceau in 1993. The premetro section known as the North–South Axis, sometimes referred to as line 3, was extended to Albert that year with five new premetro stations (Brussels-South, Porte de Hal/Hallepoort, Parvis de Saint-Gilles/Sint-Gillis Voorplein, Horta and Albert).

In 1998, Roi Baudouin/Koning Boudewijn opened on line 1A. Four stations opened in 2003 on line 1B; La Roue/Het Rad, CERIA/COOVI, Eddy Merckx, and Erasme/Erasmus. With the opening of Delacroix in September 2006, line 2 was extended beyond Clemenceau. A further extension to Gare de l'Ouest/Weststation (Brussels-West Station) in April 2009 closed the "loop" of line 2 and led to a major restructuring of metro service.

The Brussels Metro system is complemented by an S-train network serving the broader metropolitan region and opened in late 2015.

=== 2016 Brussels bombings ===
On 22 March 2016, the Islamic State bombed Maelbeek/Maalbeek metro station in a terrorist attack that coincided with another bomb attack at Brussels Airport. The bombing at Maelbeek station killed twenty people. The incident prompted the temporary closure of the entire system, and a major reduction in service for several weeks. A fundamental review of security procedures on the metro was underway as of 2016.

== Network map ==
Brussels Metro map

== Lines and stations ==
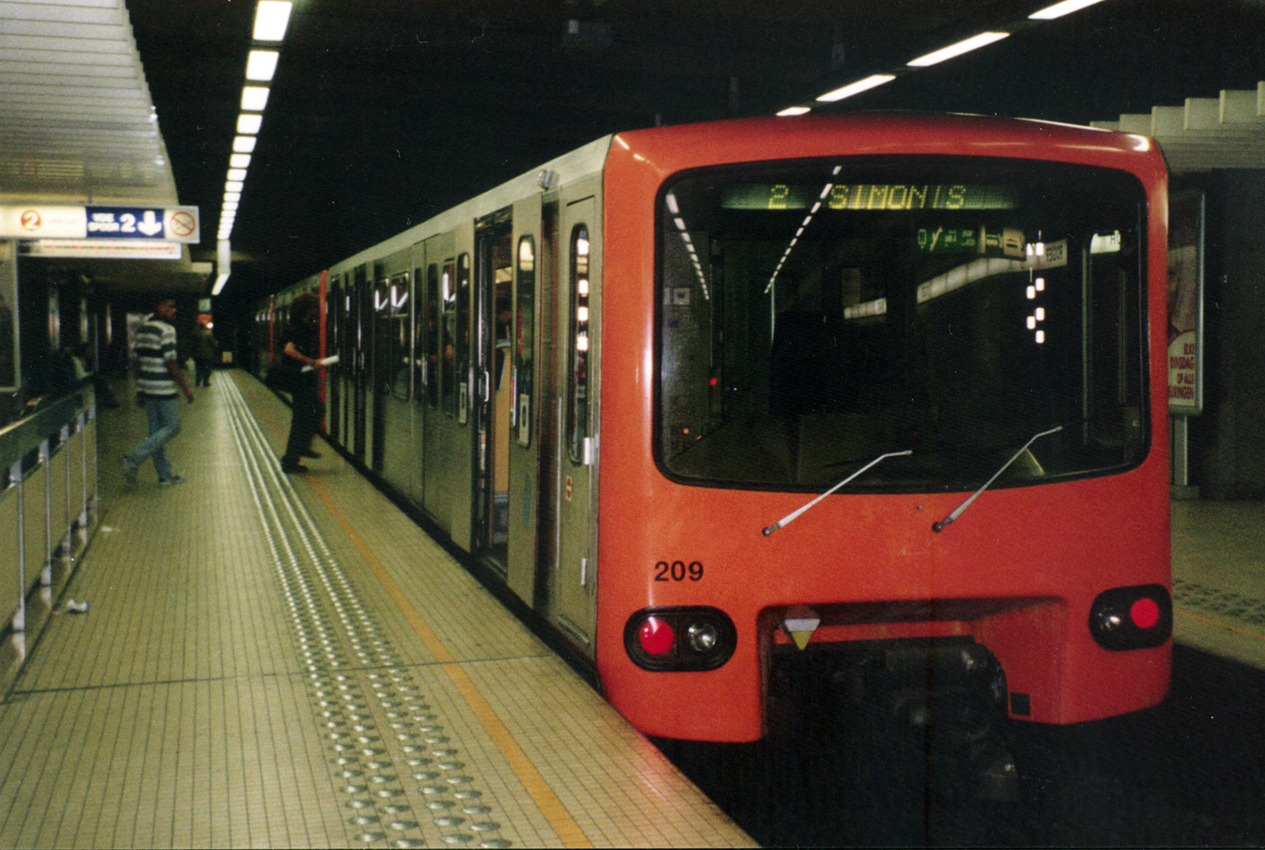
Brussels Metro train at Rogier station

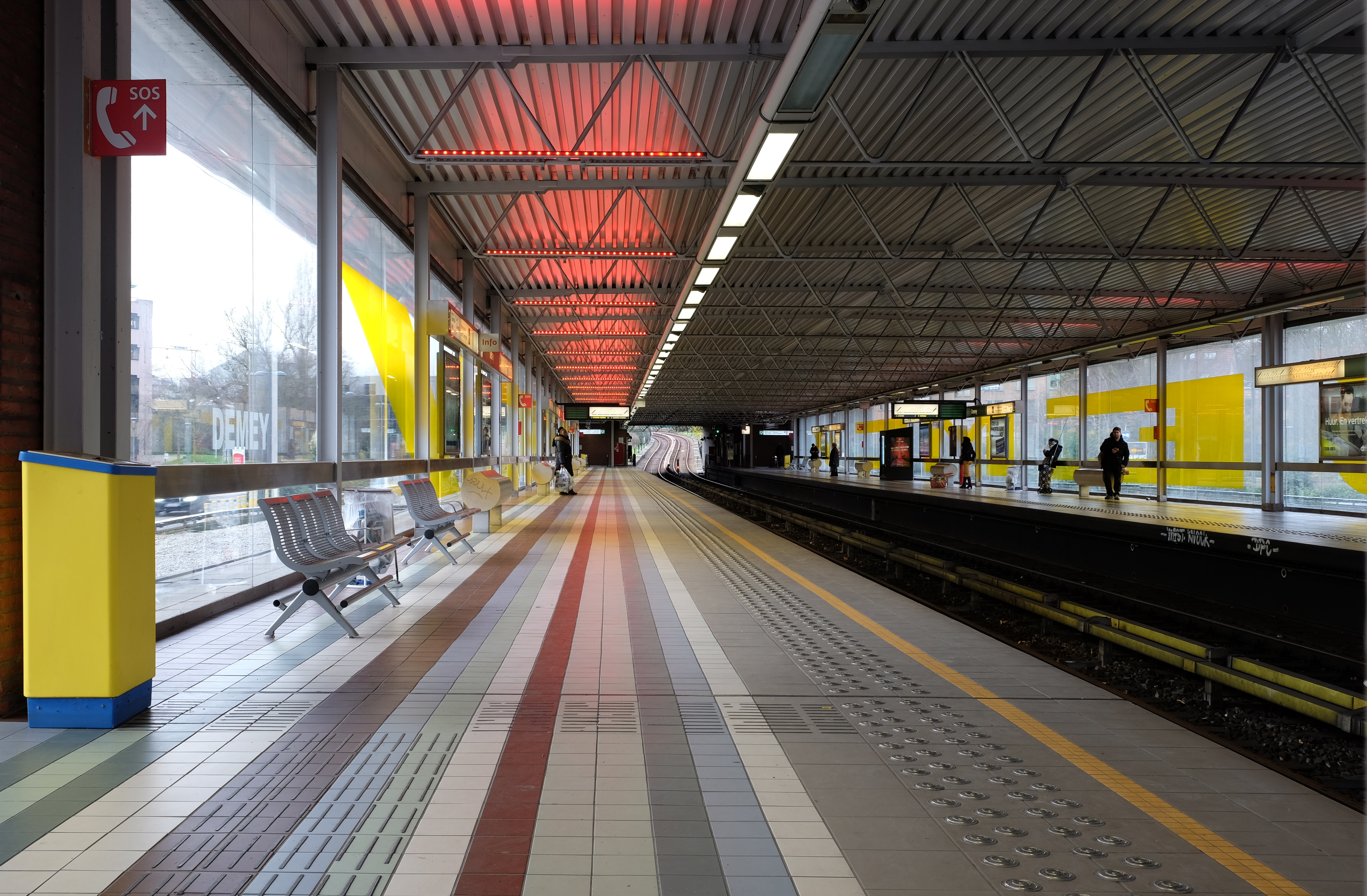
Demey metro station. The elevated third rails for both tracks are visible halfway between the platforms.

The premetro lines are powered (like the ground-level tram lines) by overhead lines at 600 V DC; the conventional metro lines use instead an elevated third rail at 900 V DC. They all use standard gauge. Conventional metro platforms are "high platforms", built flush with the floor of the metro compartments; premetro platforms are the same height, but with a lowered section at least as long as the longest tram, for compatibility with tramways which must be able to take passengers from the sidewalk of a street, or even from the street floor itself. Upgrading a line from premetro to metro service includes, among others, raising the whole platform to metro height and replacing the overhead line by a third rail power supply.

=== Metro ===
There are four conventional metro lines and, as of 2008, 59 stations (not including premetro stations). Most stations are underground, although some on lines 5 and 6 are at ground level. On 4 April 2009, the connection at Gare de l'Ouest/Weststation that enables line 2 to form a circular line was put into service. As a consequence, the metro network was significantly reorganised. The development plan for this change and related tram and bus network changes was approved by the Brussels-Capital Region in July 2005.

As of 4 April 2009, the four lines are as follows:

- Line 1 from Gare de l'Ouest/Weststation to the west to Stockel/Stokkel at the east end (formerly part of line 1B);
- Line 2 is a loop starting and ending in Simonis via the eastern side of the Small Ring (an extension of former line 2 from Delacroix north-bound to Simonis);
- Line 5 from Erasme/Erasmus to the south-west to Herrmann-Debroux to the south-east (combines parts of former lines 1A and 1B);
- Line 6 from Roi Baudouin/Koning Boudewijn to the north-west to Simonis (including the loop of the newly extended line 2; combines the former line 2, the new connection, and a branch of the former line 1A).

Line 1 (M)	Line 2 (M)	Line 5 (M)	Line 6 (M)
Gare de l'Ouest / Weststation; Stockel / Stokkel	Simonis; Elisabeth	Erasme / Erasmus; Herrmann-Debroux	Roi Baudouin / Koning Boudewijn; Elisabeth

=== Premetro ===
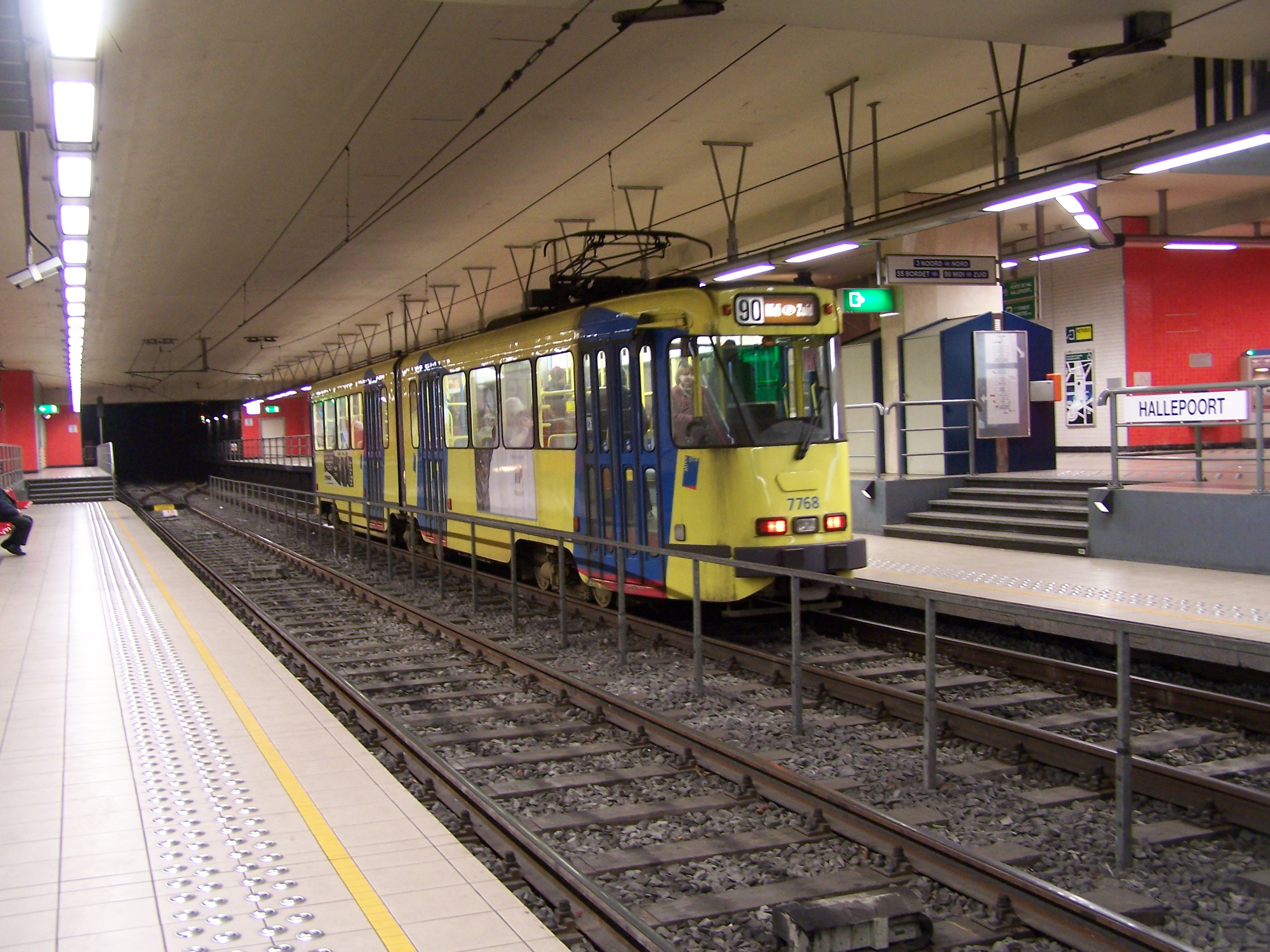
Porte de Hal/Hallepoort station in 2006, showing overhead lines and "tramway" vs. "metro" platforms. Tramway line 90 does not exist anymore.

Line 4 and Line 10 are tram lines using the North–South Axis tunnel which crosses the city centre from Brussels-North via Brussels-South to Albert. Line 4 runs from Brussels-North to Stalle Parking in the south. Line 10 runs from Hôpital Militaire/Militair Hospitaal in the north to Churchill in the south. This North–South Axis is being upgraded to metro service; works have begun in 2019, including north-eastward prolongation of the metro tunnel, and the transition to conventional metro is foreseen for 2030.

Line 7 is the main line of the Greater Ring, replacing Tram 23 and Tram 24 as of 14 March 2011. It services the Heysel/Heizel, runs under Laeken Park and then via the Greater Ring to the terminus of Line 10 to terminate one stop later at Vanderkindere for connections to tram lines 4, 10 and 92. The somewhat shorter Line 25 also runs the Greater Ring premetro, but with different termini at both ends, and the southern terminus connecting to Boondael/Boondaal railway station.

Line 4 (T)	Line 7 (T)	Line 10 (T)	Line 25 (T)
Gare du Nord / Noordstation; Stalle Parking	Heysel / Heizel; Vanderkindere	Hôpital Militaire / Militair Hospitaal; Churchill	Rogier; Gare de Boondael / Boondaal station

== Ticketing ==
MoBIB is the STIB/MIVB electronic smart card, introduced in 2007, replacing the discontinued paper tickets. It uses contactless technology based on the Calypso system originally developed for Paris and is in some ways similar e.g. to the London's Oyster card. All metro stations, buses and trams have MoBIB readers.

There is a very wide range of ticket shares to meet different needs. The cost of travel with STIB/MIVB means of transport (metro, tram and bus) is calculated per hour. As long as the journey does not exceed one hour after the first validation of the ticket, it is possible, for example, to switch from a bus to a metro train within the STIB/MIVB network without paying a second time (i.e. a new validation is required but will not be charged). Each trip has a different cost depending on the type of support purchased. Passengers can purchase monthly passes, yearly passes, 1 and 10-trip tickets and daily and 3-day passes. These can be bought over the Internet, but require customers to have a smart card reader. GO vending machines accept coins, local and international chip and PIN credit and debit cards.

Moreover, a complimentary interticketing system means that a combined STIB/MIVB ticket holder can also use the train network operated by NMBS/SNCB and/or long-distance buses and commuter services operated by De Lijn or TEC, depending on the option. With this ticket, a single journey can include multiple stages across the different modes of transport and networks.

Following a successful trial in 2019, and expedited by the COVID-19 pandemic, it is now possible to pay for STIB/MIVB journeys using a contactless bank card.

== Rolling stock ==
The Brussels Metro is served by 217 carriages of M1-M5 series, manufactured by La Brugeoise et Nivelles, ACEC, Bombardier Transportation, Alstom and CAF and delivered between 1976 and 1999, as well as 21 six-car trainsets of the new M6 series (also known as "Boa"), manufactured by CAF and delivered between 2007 and 2012. A new train type known as M7 series was commissioned on lines 1 and 5 in 2021 and will support full automation.

== Future ==
A new metro line 3 is being created from Brussels-North through Schaerbeek towards Bordet. The plan was approved in 2013. Construction started in September 2020. The present Lemonnier station will be used alongside a new station named after Toots Thielemans under the Avenue de Stalingrad/Stalingradlaan. The line is projected to begin operation by 2035.

== See also ==
- Brusseline (typeface)
- Brussels Regional Express Network
- List of Brussels Metro stations
- List of metro systems
- Métro Léger de Charleroi
- Trams in Brussels
- Transport in Brussels
