= Brussels premetro =

Belgian light rail network

Development of the Brussels Premetro (in blue) and Metro up to 2006

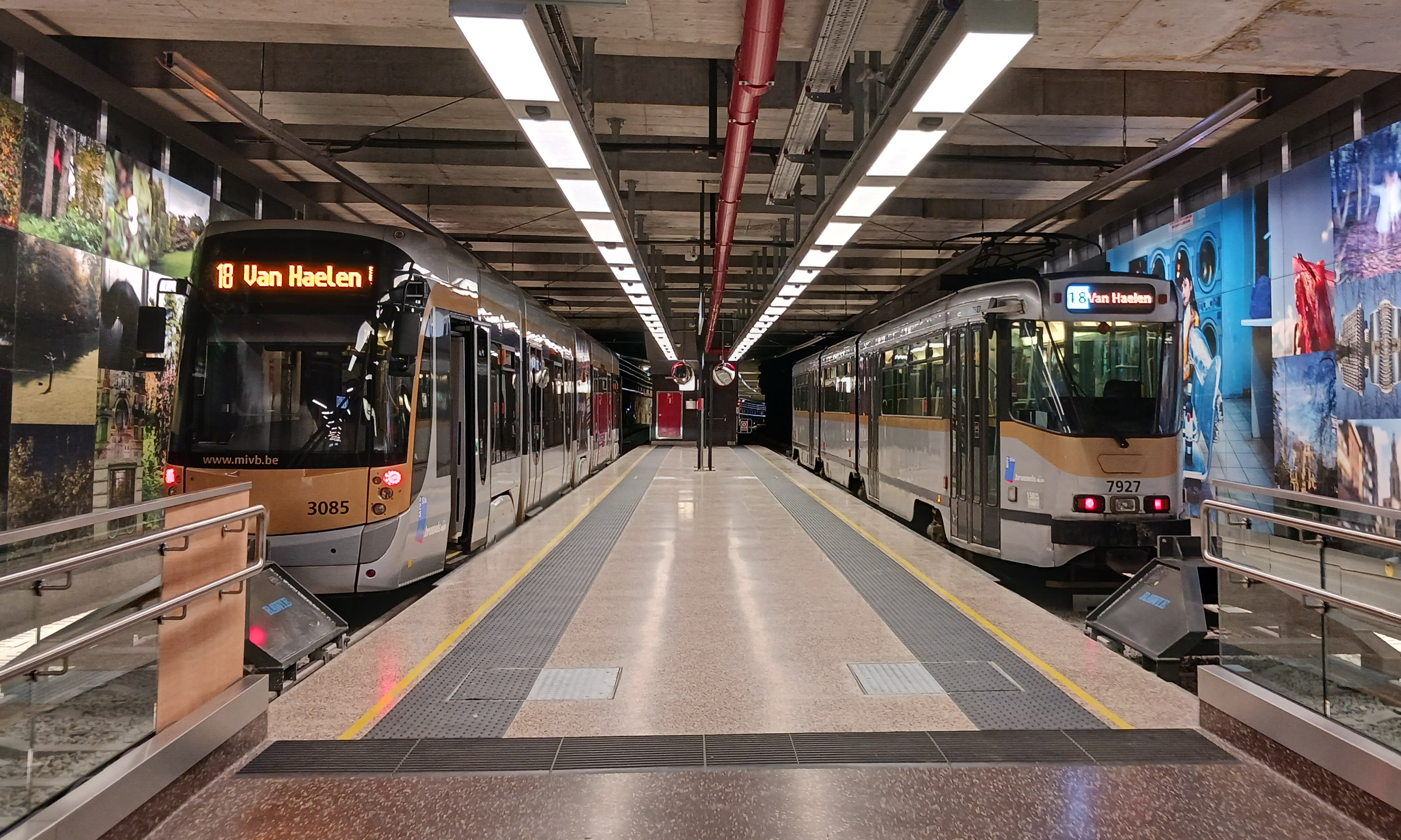
Trams at Albert premetro station

The Brussels Premetro (French: Prémétro de Bruxelles; Dutch: Brusselse premetro) is a network consisting of lines 4, 10, 7 and 25 of the Brussels tramway system. It is a standard-gauge system which runs in underground sections in the city centre and further out on surface lines. The network is operated by STIB/MIVB, the local public transport company.

The premetro tunnels have been built to allow for eventual upgrade to heavy metro, so most of the platform is high, and is connected to the street (at least in the upward direction) by escalator. At some stations, lifts have been installed, but there is a cutout section taking the level down to one foot above ground to board the trams. The three steps this entails make life difficult for passengers with baby buggies or suitcases, even though the new low-floor trams are accessible to wheelchair users.

== History ==
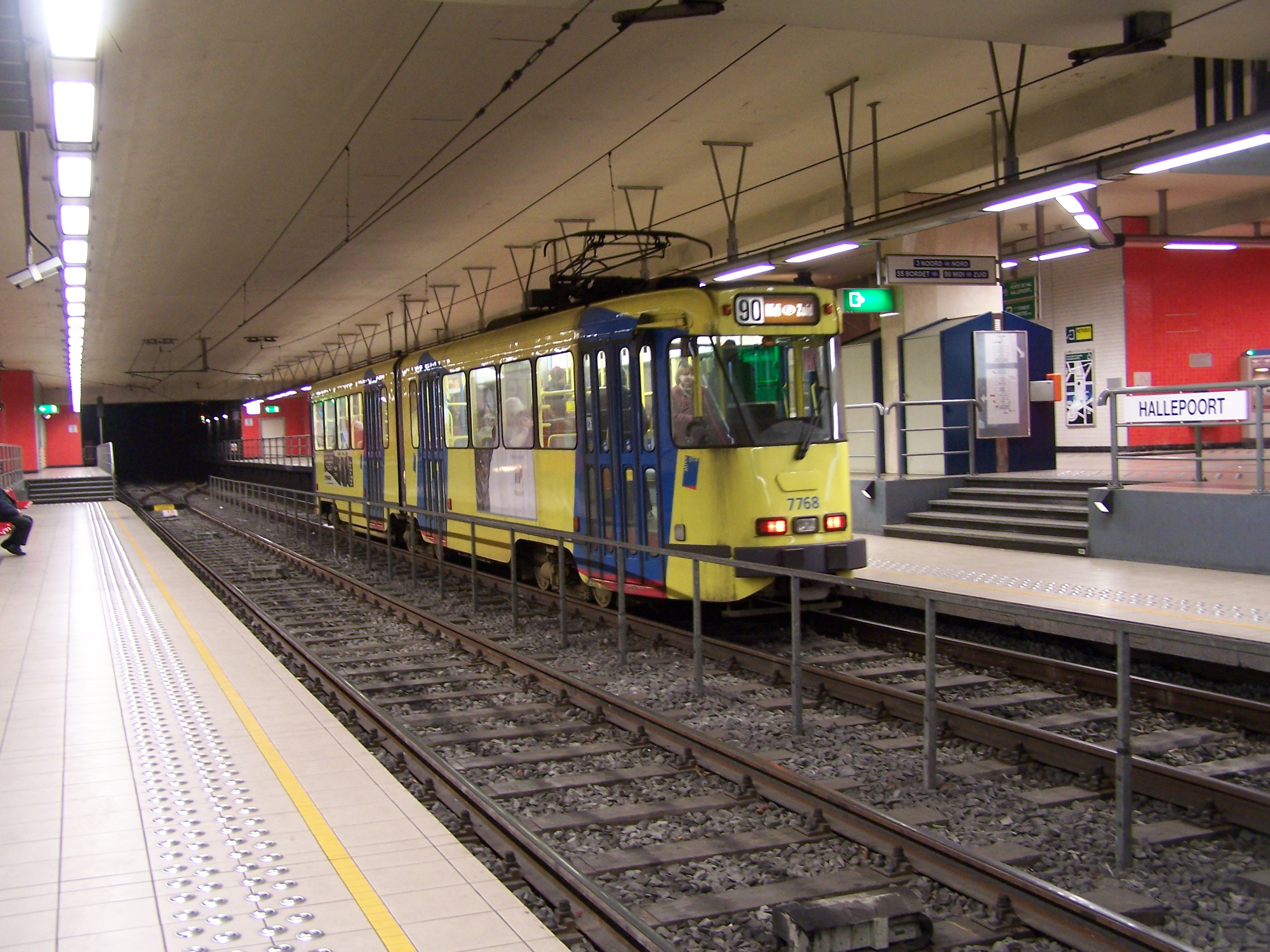
Porte de Hal/Hallepoort station in 2006, showing overhead lines and "tramway" vs. "metro" platforms.

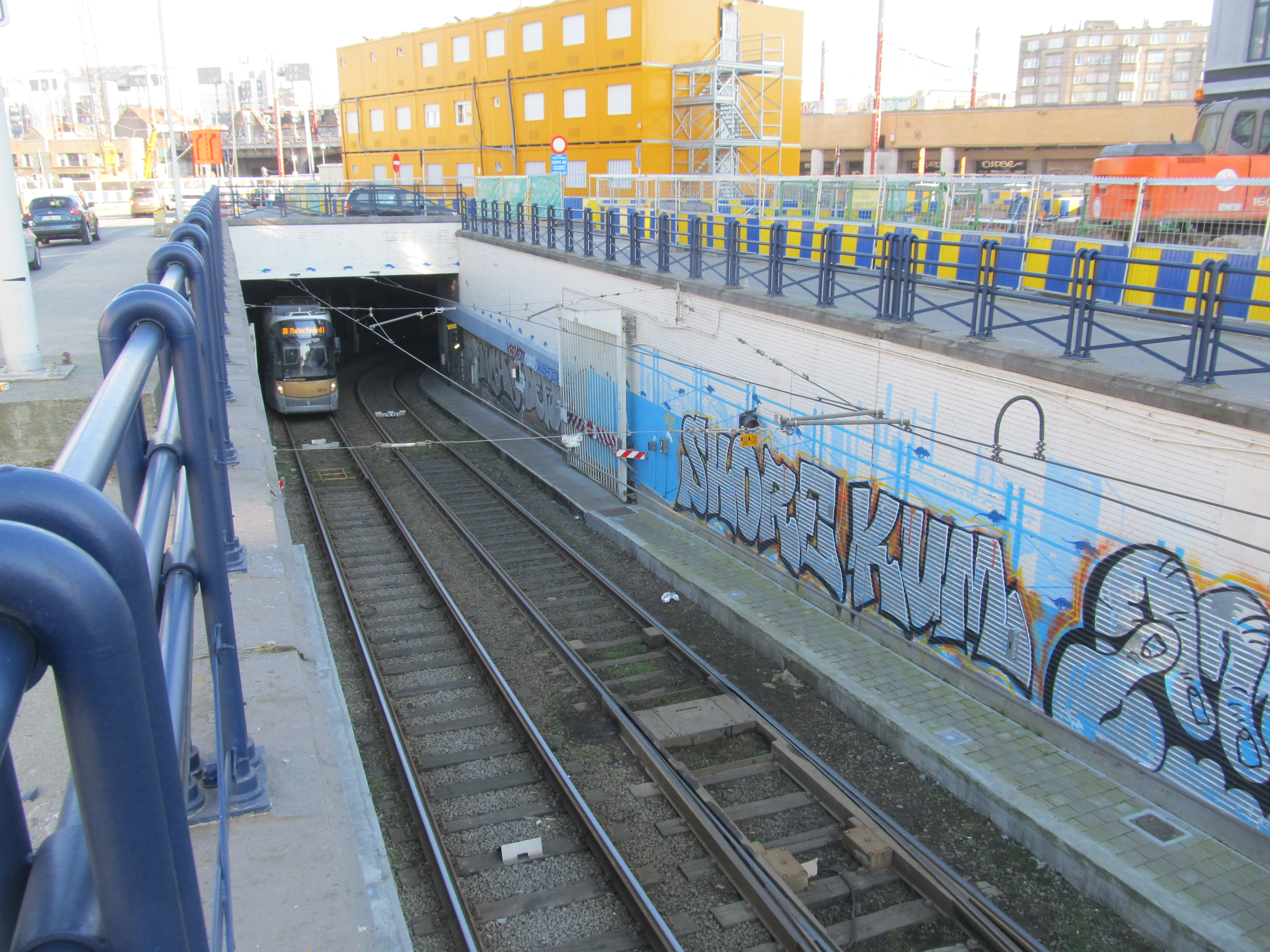
Place Bara/Baraplein portal

Growing traffic congestion led to plans to build reserved tracks for trams, and in the city centre to put them in tunnel. In 1957, the first tunnel was opened near the congested Place de la Constitution/Grondwetplein, between Brussels-South railway station and Lemonnier.

The network was planned in the 1960s to become a fully underground network, yet first plans only mention regular underground tram tunnels. At its inauguration on 17 December 1969, the premetro tramways ran on the line between De Brouckère and Schuman, which was later, in 1976, converted into the common section of the first two metro lines. These lines were then considered a single line with two branches, between De Brouckère and Tomberg and De Brouckère and Beaulieu. In 2008 the premetro lines 3 and 4 became "Chrono lines", with a near metro service.

== Infrastructure ==
- West–East Axis: first section 1969, conversion to metro 1976
- Small Ring: first section 1970, conversion to metro 1988
- North–South Axis: first section 1976, conversion to metro being prepared
- Greater Ring: first section 1972, no concrete conversion planned

== Lines ==
Line 4 and Line 10 are tram lines using the North–South Axis tunnel which crosses the city centre from Brussels-North via Brussels-South to Albert. Line 4 runs from Brussels-North to Stalle Parking in the south. Line 10 runs from Hôpital Militaire/Militair Hospitaal in the north to Churchill in the south. This North–South Axis is being upgraded to metro service; works have begun in 2019, including north-eastward prolongation of the metro tunnel, and the transition to conventional metro is foreseen for 2030.

Line 7 is the main line of the Greater Ring, replacing Tram 23 and Tram 24 as of 14 March 2011. It services the Heysel/Heizel, runs under Laeken Park and then via the Greater Ring to the terminus of Line 10 to terminate one stop later at Vanderkindere for connections to tram lines 4, 10 and 92. The somewhat shorter Line 25 also runs the Greater Ring premetro, but with different termini at both ends, and the southern terminus connecting to Boondael/Boondaal railway station.

== See also ==
- Trams in Brussels
- List of premetro systems
- Lists of rapid transit systems
