= Brussels tram route 23 =

Tram route in Brussels, Belgium

The tram route 23 in Brussels, Belgium, was operated by STIB/MIVB. It ran between the Vanderkindere stop in the southern municipality of Uccle, which was also the terminus for tram route 24 and where passengers could commute with tram routes 3, 4 and 92, and Heysel/Heizel metro station in Laeken in the City of Brussels, which offers transit with the Metro line 6, tram route 51 and bus routes 84 and 88.

== Route ==
The tram route formed a half-circle from the south of Brussels to its north via the eastern part of the city. It used to start at Brussels-South railway station, where Eurostar and Thalys trains from the United Kingdom and France arrive, but the route was later shortened to start at the Vanderkindere stop. Tram route 24 followed the same rails as tram 23 between the Vanderkindere and Princesse Elisabeth/Prinses Elisabeth stops, where route 24 deviated towards Schaerbeek railway station, one stop further. Tram route 25 also followed the same rails as routes 23 and 24 for long, between the Buyl and Meiser stops.

Starting from the Vanderkindere crossroad on the Greater Ring (Brussels' second ring road), the tram ran in the middle of this road up to the Bois de la Cambre/Ter Kamerenbos, that the tram route avoided via the Chaussée de Waterloo/Waterloosesteenweg, the Avenue Legrand/Legrandlaan and the Boulevard de la Cambre/Terkamerenlaan, crossing the municipalities of Ixelles, City of Brussels and Ixelles again. At this point, the tram route followed the Greater Ring up to Gros Tilleul/Dikke Linde, crossing the municipalities of Etterbeek past Etterbeek railway station, Woluwe-Saint-Pierre at Montgomery metro station, Woluwe-Saint-Lambert at Georges Henri premetro station, Schaerbeek up to the Teichman bridge, and the City of Brussels again. Past the Gros Tilleul crossroad, the tram route ran under Laeken Park up to the Centenaire stop, and then joined Heysel/Heizel metro station via another tunnel.

From 14 March 2011, the newly formed tram 7 follows the same route as tram 23, but with a much higher frequency. Because of the frequency being brought up to 'metro' level, its line number was altered to the lower regions, for those are the metro and so-called 'chrono' tramlines. Tram 24 was also taken over completely by the newly formed tram 7.

== See also ==
- List of Brussels tram routes
