= Stuyvenbergh metro station =

Metro station in Brussels, Belgium

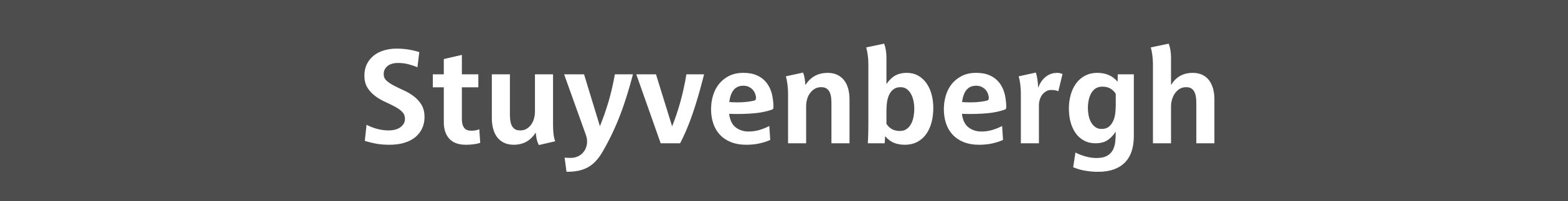

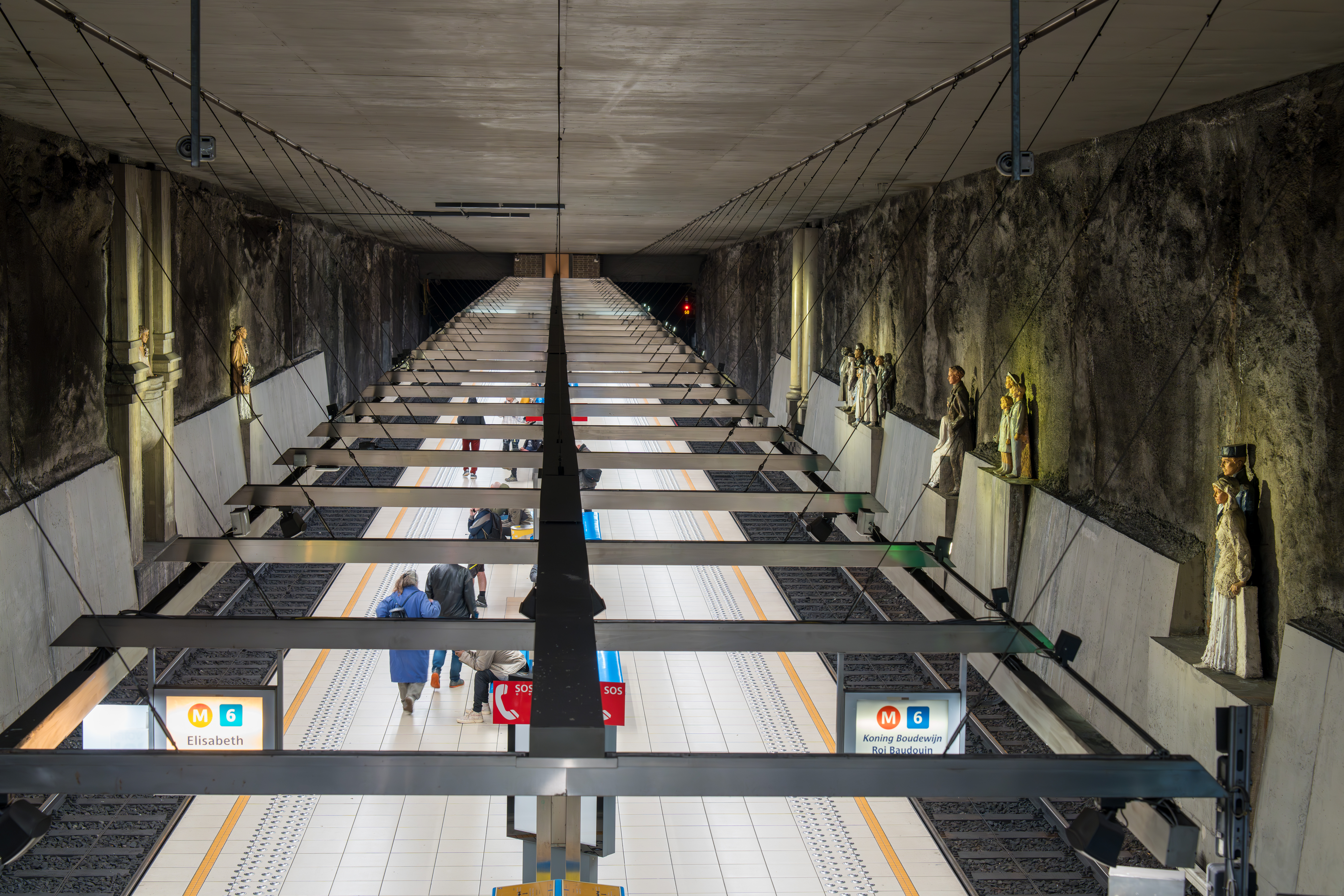
- Stuyvenbergh metro station

General information
- Location: Avenue Houba De Strooper / Houba De Strooperlaan; 1020 Laeken, City of Brussels, Brussels-Capital Region, Belgium
- Coordinates: 50°53′10″N 4°20′30″E
- Owner: STIB/MIVB
- Platforms: 1 island platform
- Tracks: 2

Construction
- Structure type: Underground

History
- Opened: 5 July 1985; 41 years ago

Services
Preceding station	Brussels Metro	Following station
Bockstael towards Elisabeth	Line 6	Houba-Brugmann towards King Baudouin
Location

Stuyvenbergh is a Brussels Metro station on the northern branch of line 6. It is located under the intersection of the Avenue Houba De Strooper/Houba De Strooperlaan, the Avenue Émile Bockstael/Émile Bockstaellaan and the Avenue De Smet De Naeyer/De Smet De Naeyerlaan, in Laeken, in the north-west of the City of Brussels, Belgium. The station takes its name from the Château of Stuyvenberg, which is just to the east, in Laeken Park.

The metro station opened on 5 July 1985 as part of the Bockstael–Heysel/Heizel extension of former line 1A, including the stations Houba-Brugmann and Heysel/Heizel. Then, following the reorganisation of the Brussels Metro on 4 April 2009, it is served by line 6.

== See also ==
- Transport in Brussels
- History of Brussels
