= Brussels tram route 24 =

Tram route in Brussels, Belgium

The tram route 24 in Brussels, Belgium, was operated by STIB/MIVB, and connected Schaerbeek railway station to the Vanderkindere stop in the southern municipality of Uccle. The route ran only on weekdays until 8 p.m.

== Route ==
Starting from Schaerbeek railway station, the route ran on the Avenue Princesse Elisabeth/Prinses Elisabethlaan and then turned left on the Greater Ring (Brussels' second ring road), where it joined tram route 23. The route then ran along that road up to the Vanderkindere crossroad. After the Meiser stop where tram route 25 joined routes 23 and 24, the route entered a tunnel known as the Greater Ring Axis, which crosses the municipalities of Woluwe-Saint-Lambert, Woluwe-Saint-Pierre at Montgomery metro station and Etterbeek. The tunnel ends after Boileau premetro station, then connects with the Belgian rail at Etterbeek railway station, then crosses the municipalities of Ixelles, City of Brussels and Uccle.

From 14 March 2011, tram routes 23 and 24 were replaced by tram route 7, which serves the same route as tram 23, as well as tram 24 apart from the Schaerbeek Gare/Schaarbeek Station stop.

== See also ==
- List of Brussels tram routes
