= Heysel =

Heysel (French: [ɛzɛl]) or Heizel (Dutch: [ˈɦɛizəl]) is an area in Brussels and may in particular refer to:

- Heysel Plateau, a part of Brussels
- Heysel/Heizel metro station, one of the metro stations on line 6 (formerly 1A) of the Brussels Metro
- Heysel Stadium, see King Baudouin Stadium
- Heysel Stadium disaster of May 29, 1985
