= Houba-Brugmann metro station =

Metro station in Brussels, Belgium

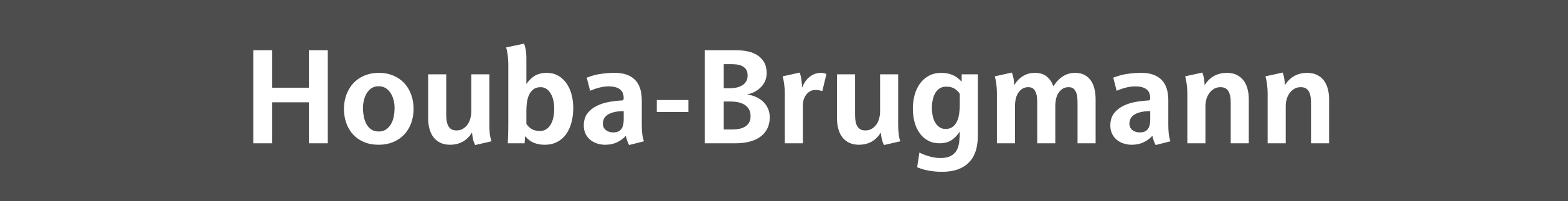

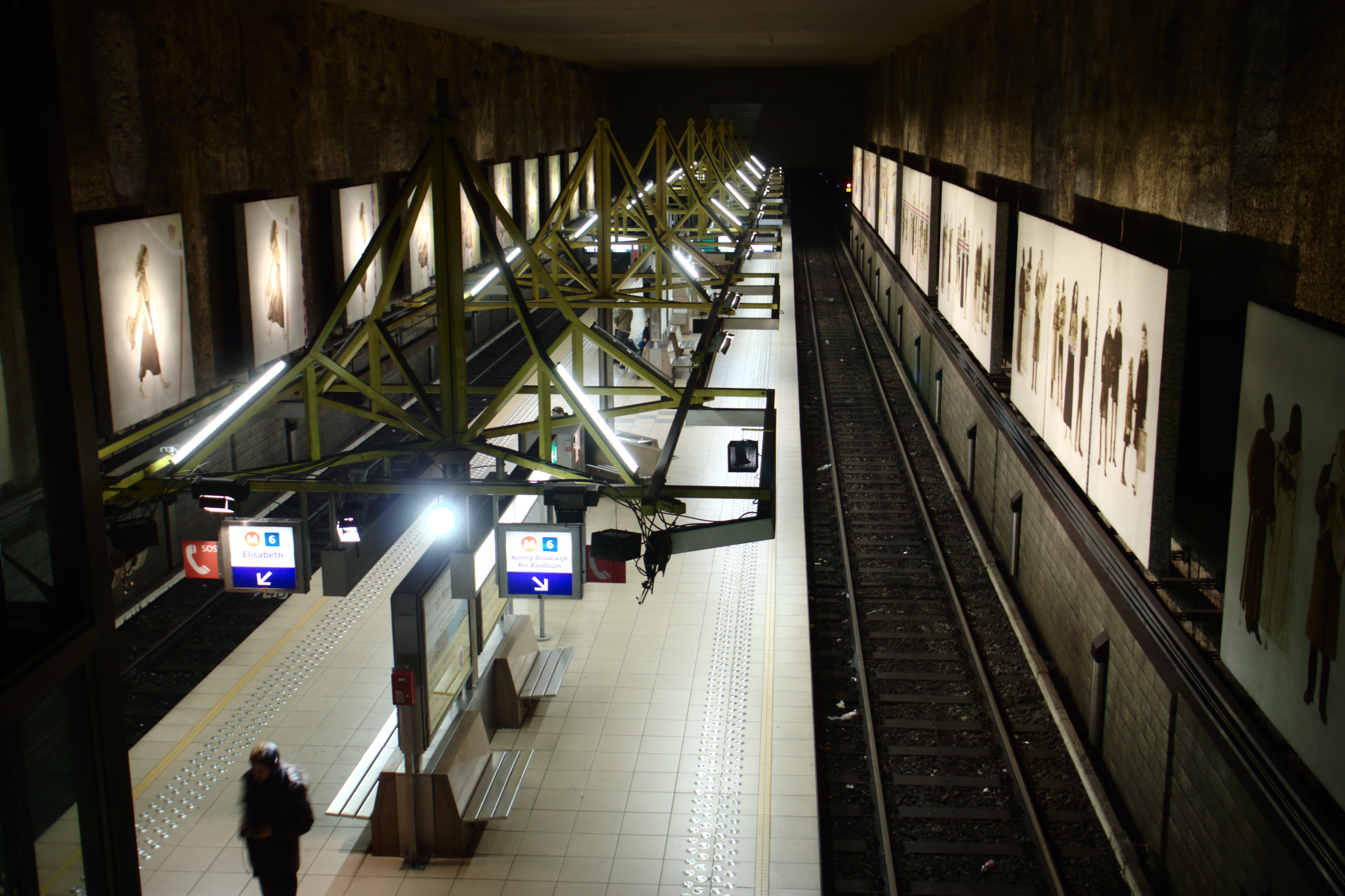
- Houba-Brugmann metro station

General information
- Location: Avenue Houba De Strooper / Houba De Strooperlaan; 1020 Laeken, City of Brussels, Brussels-Capital Region, Belgium
- Coordinates: 50°53′25″N 4°20′13″E
- Owner: STIB/MIVB
- Platforms: 1 island platform
- Tracks: 2

Construction
- Structure type: Underground

History
- Opened: 5 July 1985; 41 years ago

Services
Preceding station	Brussels Metro	Following station
Stuyvenbergh towards Elisabeth	Line 6	Heysel/Heizel towards King Baudouin
Location

Houba-Brugmann is a Brussels Metro station on the northern branch of line 6. It is located under the Avenue Houba De Strooper/Houba De Strooperlaan, near Brugmann University Hospital, in Laeken, in the north-west of the City of Brussels, Belgium. The station is jointly named after the city official Louis Houba and the 19th-century philanthropist Georges Brugmann.

The metro station opened on 5 July 1985 as part of the Bockstael–Heysel/Heizel extension of former line 1A, including the stations Stuyvenbergh and Heysel/Heizel. Then, following the reorganisation of the Brussels Metro on 4 April 2009, it is served by line 6.

== See also ==
- Transport in Brussels
- History of Brussels
