= Porte de Namur metro station =

Metro station in Brussels, Belgium

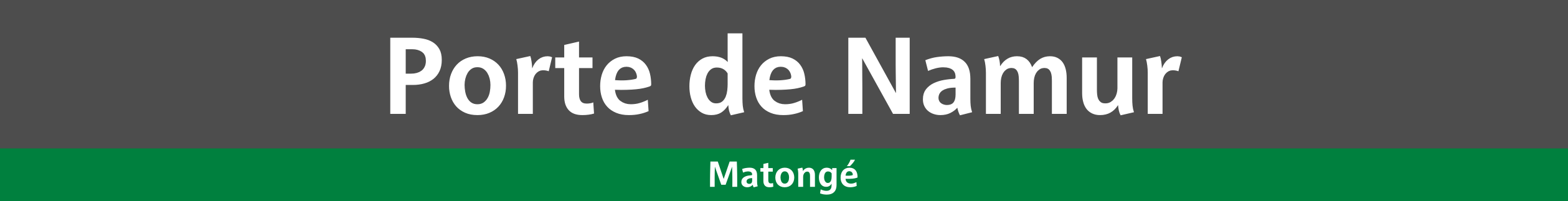
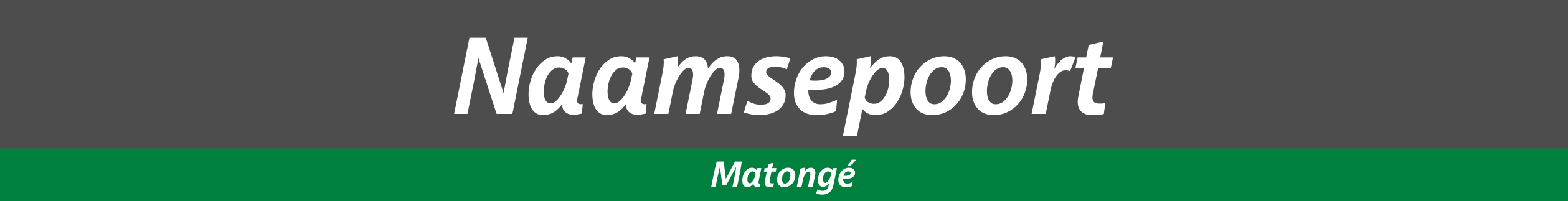

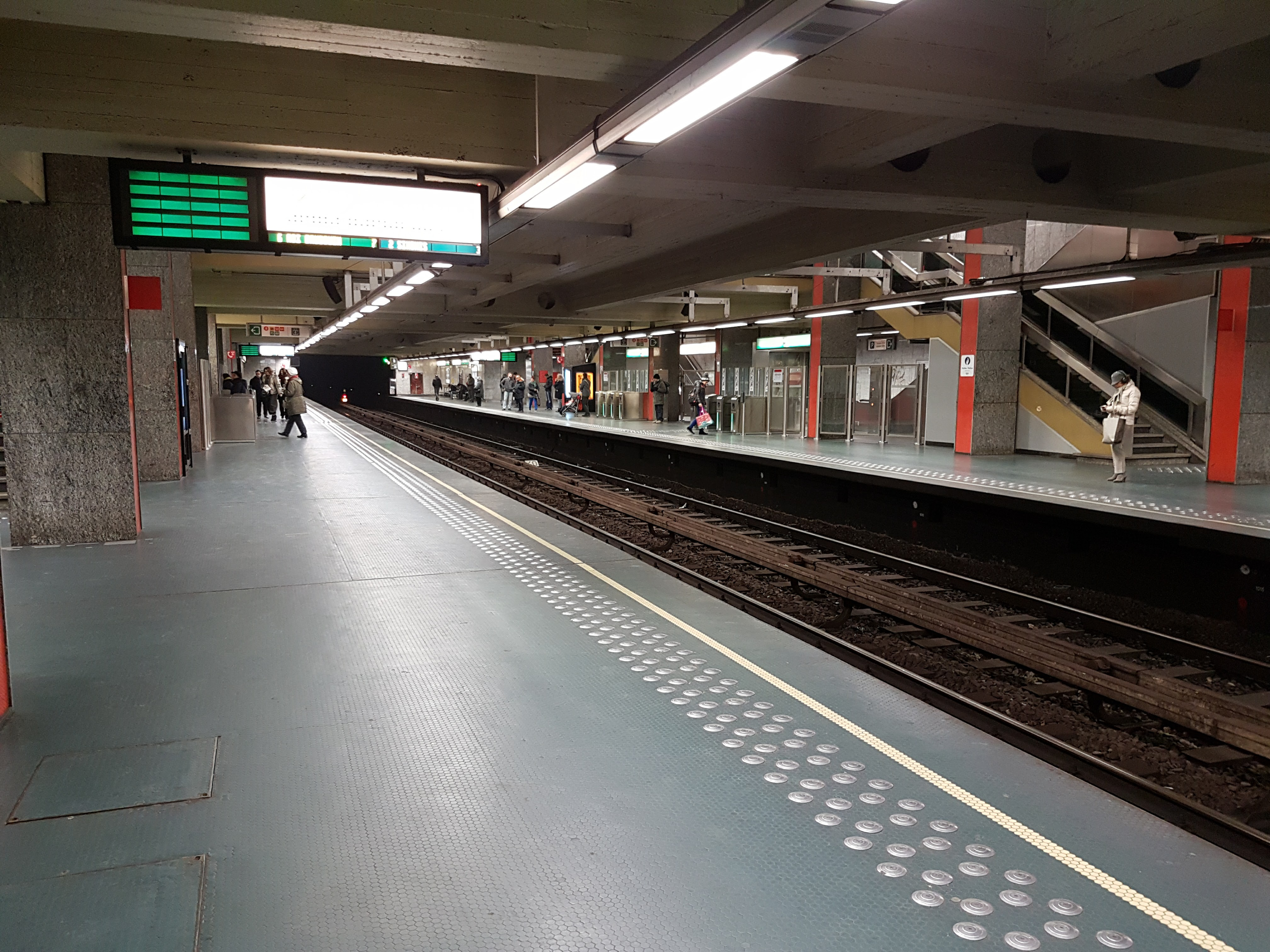
- Porte de Namur/Naamsepoort metro station

General information
- Location: Square du Bastion / Bolwerksquare; 1050 Ixelles, Brussels-Capital Region, Belgium
- Coordinates: 50°50′18″N 4°21′44″E
- Owner: STIB/MIVB
- Platforms: 2
- Tracks: 2

Construction
- Structure type: Underground

History
- Opened: 20 December 1970; 55 years ago (premetro); 2 October 1988; 37 years ago (metro)

Services
Preceding station	Brussels Metro	Following station
Trône/Troon towards Elisabeth	Line 2	Louise/Louiza towards Simonis
Trône/Troon towards Elisabeth	Line 6	Louise/Louiza towards King Baudouin
Location

Porte de Namur (French, pronounced [pɔʁt də namyʁ]) or Naamsepoort (Dutch, pronounced [ˈnaːmsəˌpoːrt]) is a Brussels Metro station on the southern segment of lines 2 and 6. It is located under the Small Ring (Brussels' inner ring road) at the Square du Bastion/Bolwerksquare, next to the Chaussée d'Ixelles/Elsense Steenweg, in the municipality of Ixelles, south of the City of Brussels, Belgium. The station takes its name from the Namur Gate area, itself named after the Namur Gate in Brussels' old city walls.

The station opened on 20 December 1970 as a premetro (underground tram) station on the tram line between Madou and Porte de Namur/Naamsepoort. It became a heavy metro station, serving line 2, when this line was converted on 2 October 1988. Then, following the reorganisation of the Brussels Metro on 4 April 2009, it now lies on the joint section of lines 2 and 6.

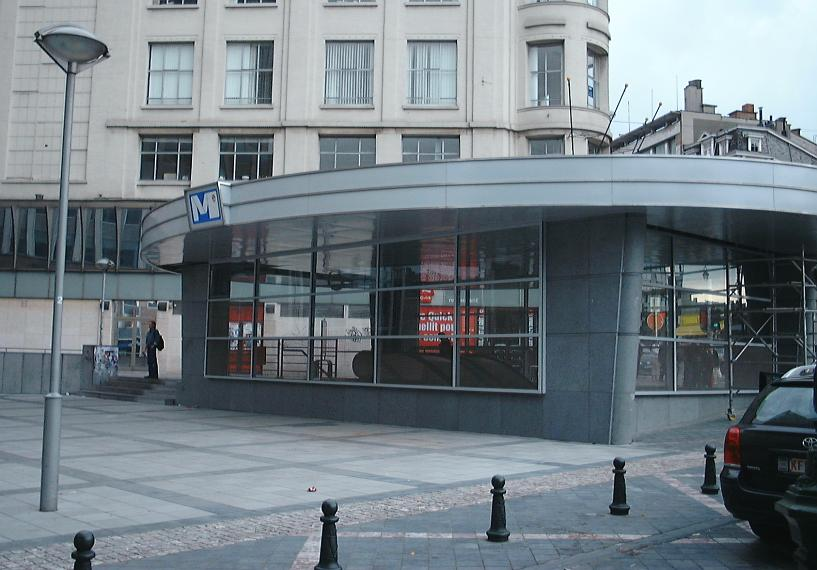
Entrance to the station

== See also ==
- Transport in Brussels
- History of Brussels
