= Demey metro station =

Metro station in Brussels, Belgium

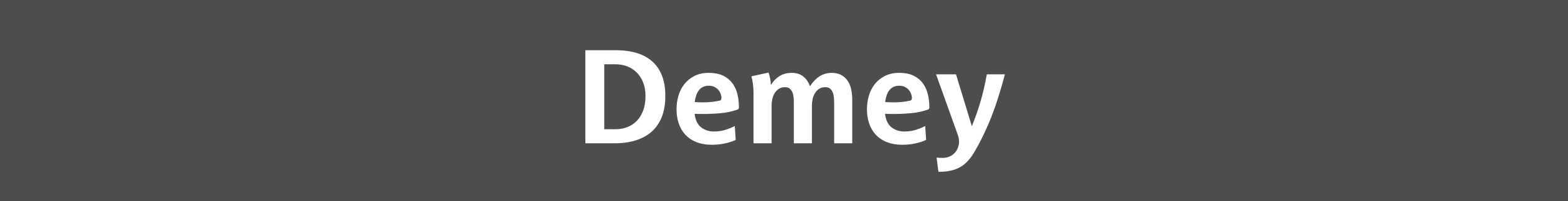

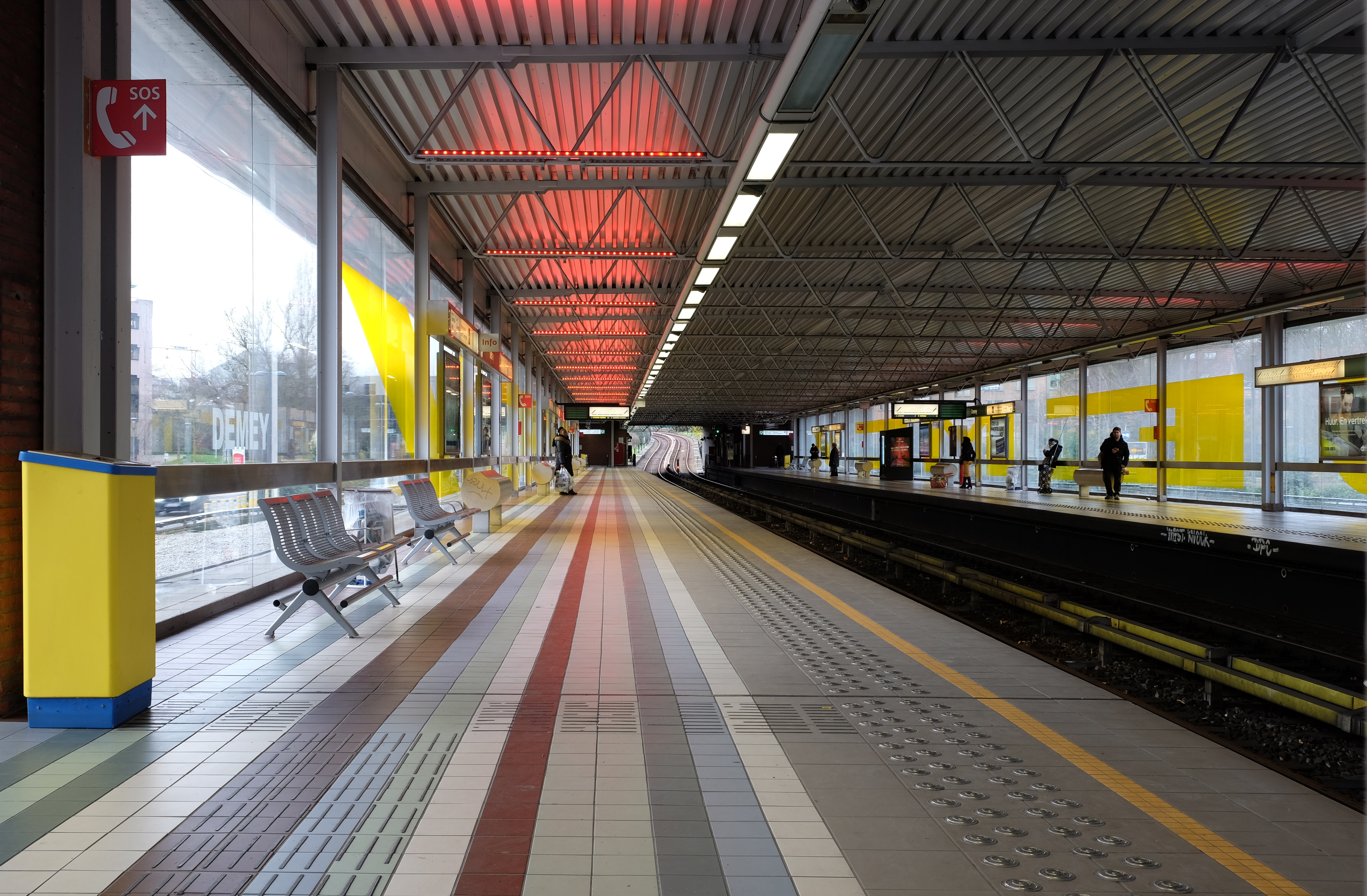
- Demey metro station

General information
- Location: Avenue Louis Dehoux / Louis Dehouxlaan; 1160 Auderghem, Brussels-Capital Region, Belgium
- Coordinates: 50°48′48″N 4°25′17″E
- Owner: STIB/MIVB
- Platforms: 2
- Tracks: 2

Construction
- Structure type: At grade

History
- Opened: 17 June 1977; 49 years ago

Services
Preceding station	Brussels Metro	Following station
Beaulieu towards Erasme/Erasmus	Line 5	Herrmann-Debroux Terminus
Location

Demey (French pronunciation: [dəmɛ]) is a Brussels Metro station on the eastern branch of line 5. It is located in the municipality of Auderghem, in the south-eastern part of Brussels, Belgium. It is named after a former Mayor of Auderghem, Gustave Demey.

The metro station opened on 17 June 1977. Until the opening of the extension to Herrmann-Debroux in 1985, Demey station was the eastern terminus of line 1A. Then, following the reorganisation of the Brussels Metro on 4 April 2009, it is served by the extended east–west line 5.

== See also ==
- Transport in Brussels
- History of Brussels
