= Georges Henri premetro station =

Premetro station in Brussels, Belgium

Coordinates: 50.84277°N 4.4061°E

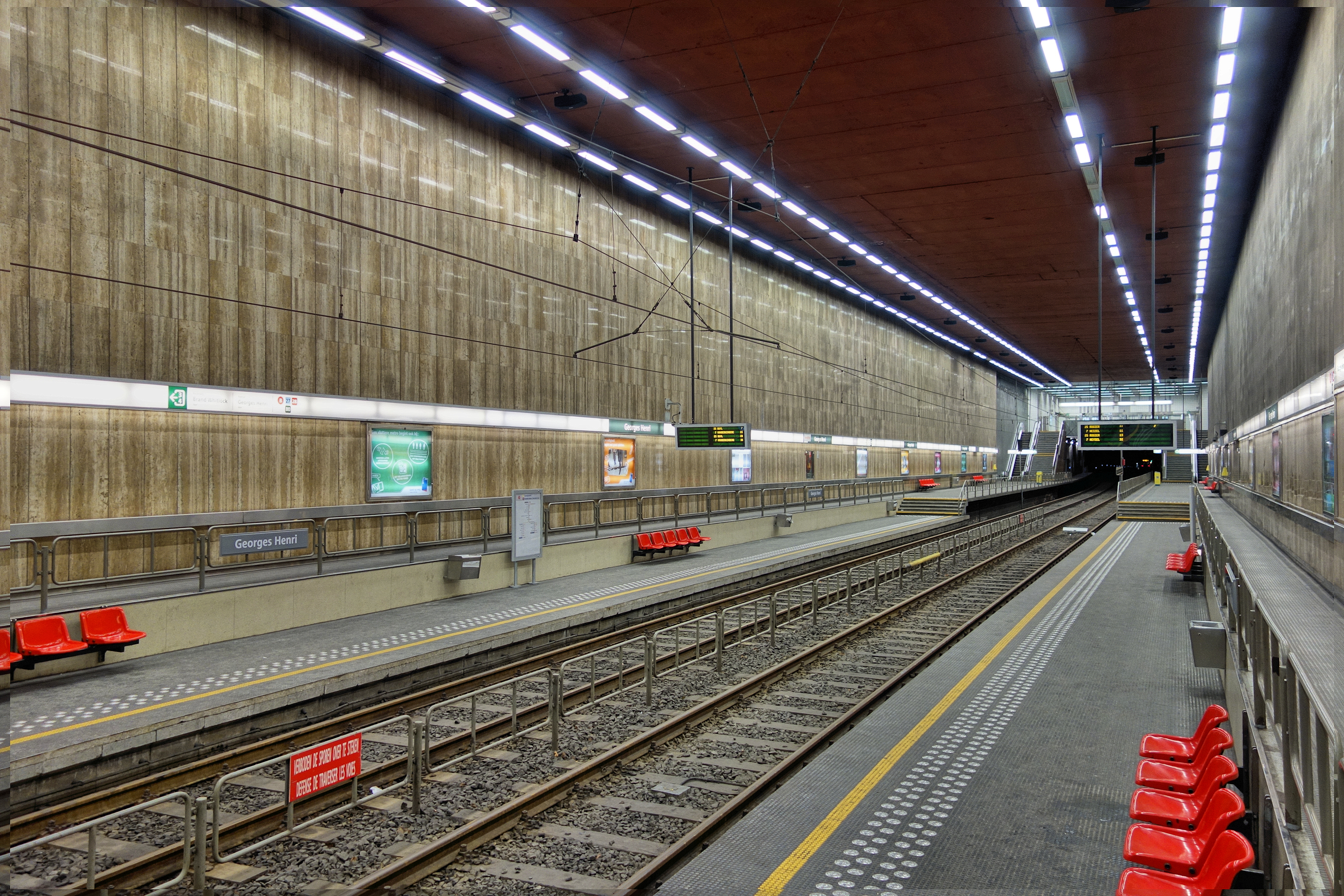
Georges Henri premetro station

Georges Henri (French pronunciation: [ʒɔʁʒ ɑ̃ʁi]) is a premetro (underground tram) station located in the municipality of Woluwe-Saint-Lambert in Brussels, Belgium. The station opened on 30 January 1975. Named for the Avenue Georges Henri/Georges Henrilaan, which runs perpendicular to the Greater Ring at the south end of the station, it is located on the Boulevard Brand Whitlock/Brand Whitlocklaan section of the Greater Ring. It is the second of four stations on the Greater Ring premetro, connected by Diamant premetro station to the north and Montgomery metro station to the south. The station is served by the 7 and 25 trams and the 27, 28 and 80 buses.

As with the majority of Brussels metro stations an artwork is displayed in the station, a work entitled t Is de wind created by Flemish ceramicist Pieter Stockmans.

== See also ==
- Transport in Brussels
- History of Brussels
