= Beaulieu metro station =

Metro station in Brussels, Belgium

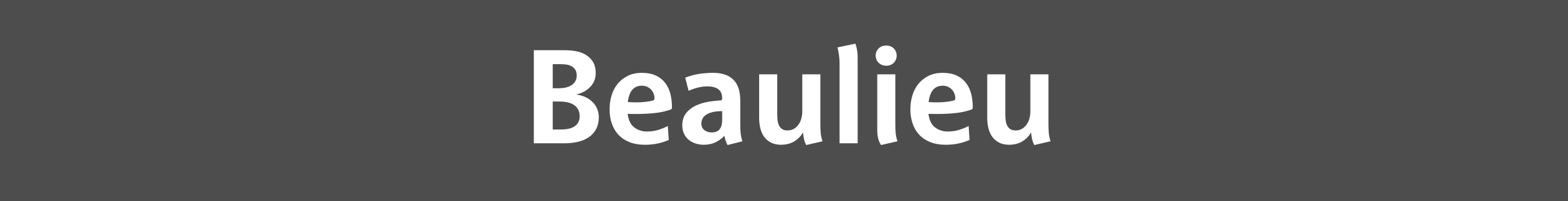

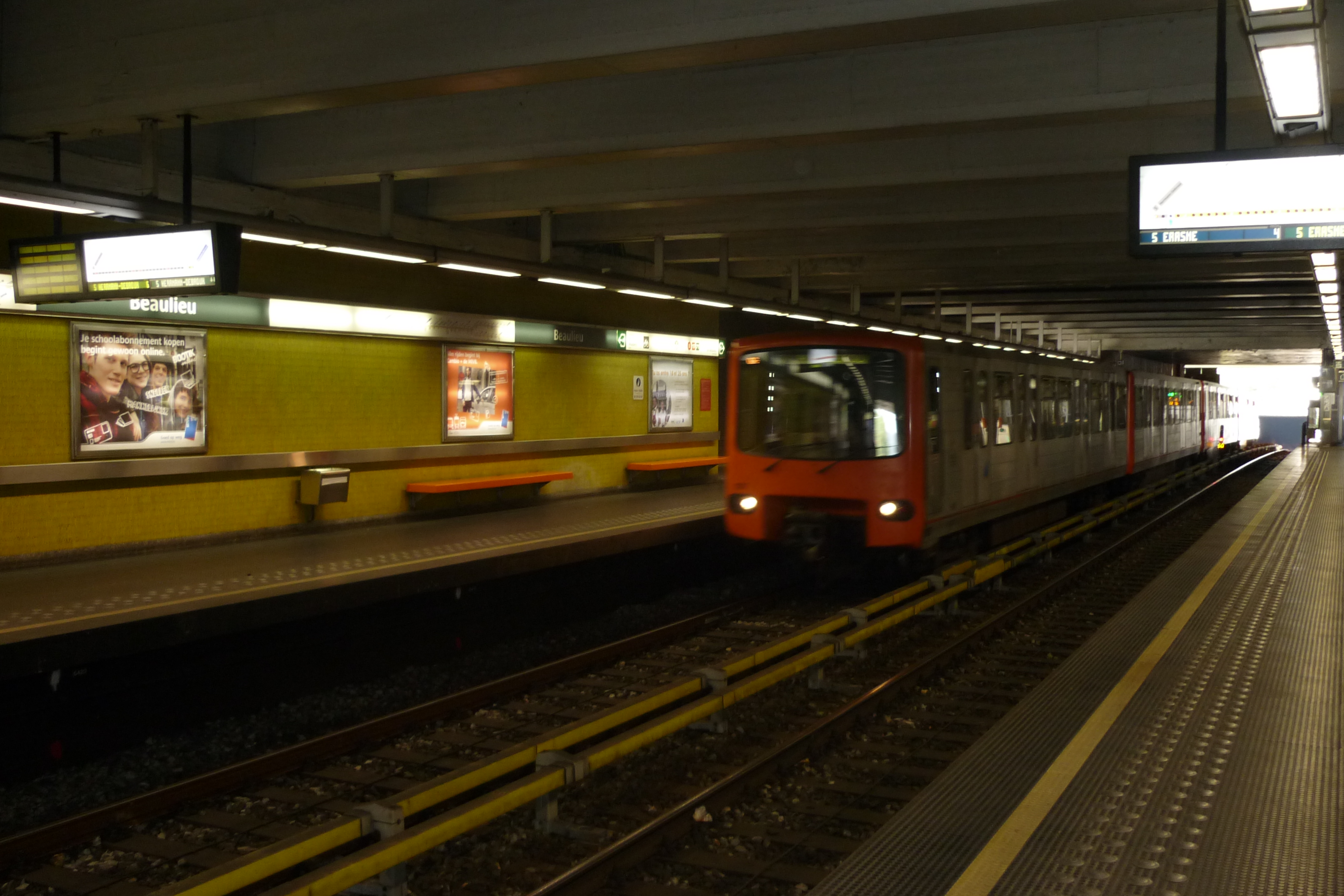
- Beaulieu metro station

General information
- Location: Avenue Charles Michiels / Charles Michielslaan; 1160 Auderghem, Brussels-Capital Region, Belgium
- Coordinates: 50°48′54″N 4°24′34″E
- Owner: STIB/MIVB
- Platforms: 2
- Tracks: 2

Construction
- Structure type: Surface level

History
- Opened: 20 September 1976; 50 years ago

Services
Preceding station	Brussels Metro	Following station
Delta towards Erasme/Erasmus	Line 5	Demey towards Herrmann-Debroux
Location

Beaulieu (French pronunciation: [boljø]) is a Brussels Metro station on the eastern branch of line 5. It is located in the municipality of Auderghem, in the south-eastern part of Brussels, Belgium. The station takes its name from the nearby Avenue de Beaulieu/Beaulieulaan.

The metro station opened on 20 September 1976. Until 1977, it was the eastern terminus of what was line 1A, when the extension to Demey station was opened. In 1985, the line was further extended to Herrmann-Debroux. Then, following the reorganisation of the Brussels Metro on 4 April 2009, it is served by the extended east–west line 5.

== See also ==
- Transport in Brussels
- History of Brussels
