= Georges Brugmann =

Belgian financier and philanthropist

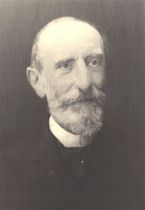
Georges Brugmann

Georges Edmond Brugmann (1829–1900) was a Belgian financier and philanthropist.

== Life ==
Brugmann was born in Verviers on 18 October 1829, the son of the industrialist and financier Frédéric Brugmann. He studied at the Ecole Centrale de Commerce et d'Industrie in Brussels, before working at the family bank. After his father's death in 1852 and his elder brother's in 1853, he and his younger brother Ernest headed the family firm. He also became a deacon in the Protestant Church of Brussels, and contributed to the building of several Protestant churches in Belgium.

Brugmann invested heavily in railways and tramways. In 1857 he became chief financial officer of the newly founded Compagnie Générale du Matériel de Chemins de Fer, which supplied railway equipment to companies in Spain, Turkey and Italy, and in 1874 helped found the Société Générale de Tramways. In the 1880s he was an early investor in projects for the colonisation of the Congo Free State, and he was one of the founders of the Compagnie du Congo pour le Commerce et l'Industrie (1886). In 1888 the family bank, Brugmann et Fils, was bought by Banque Baiser, which in 1910 itself became part of Deutsche Bank.

Brugmann was an active philanthropist in the Association pour secourir les pauvres honteux (now Secours et Conseils), and served as honorary consul (consul general in 1891) in Brussels for Sweden and Norway from 1858 until his death in 1900. He never married, and died in Brussels on 23 November 1900, leaving ten million francs for the founding of what is now Brugmann University Hospital.

Houba-Brugmann metro station in Brussels is partly named after him, as are the Avenue Brugmann and Parc Brugmann in Uccle, and the Brugmann Mountains in Antarctica.
