= Brussels tram route 7 =

Tram route in Brussels, Belgium

STIB/MIVB Route 7
- Heysel/Heizel – Vanderkindere
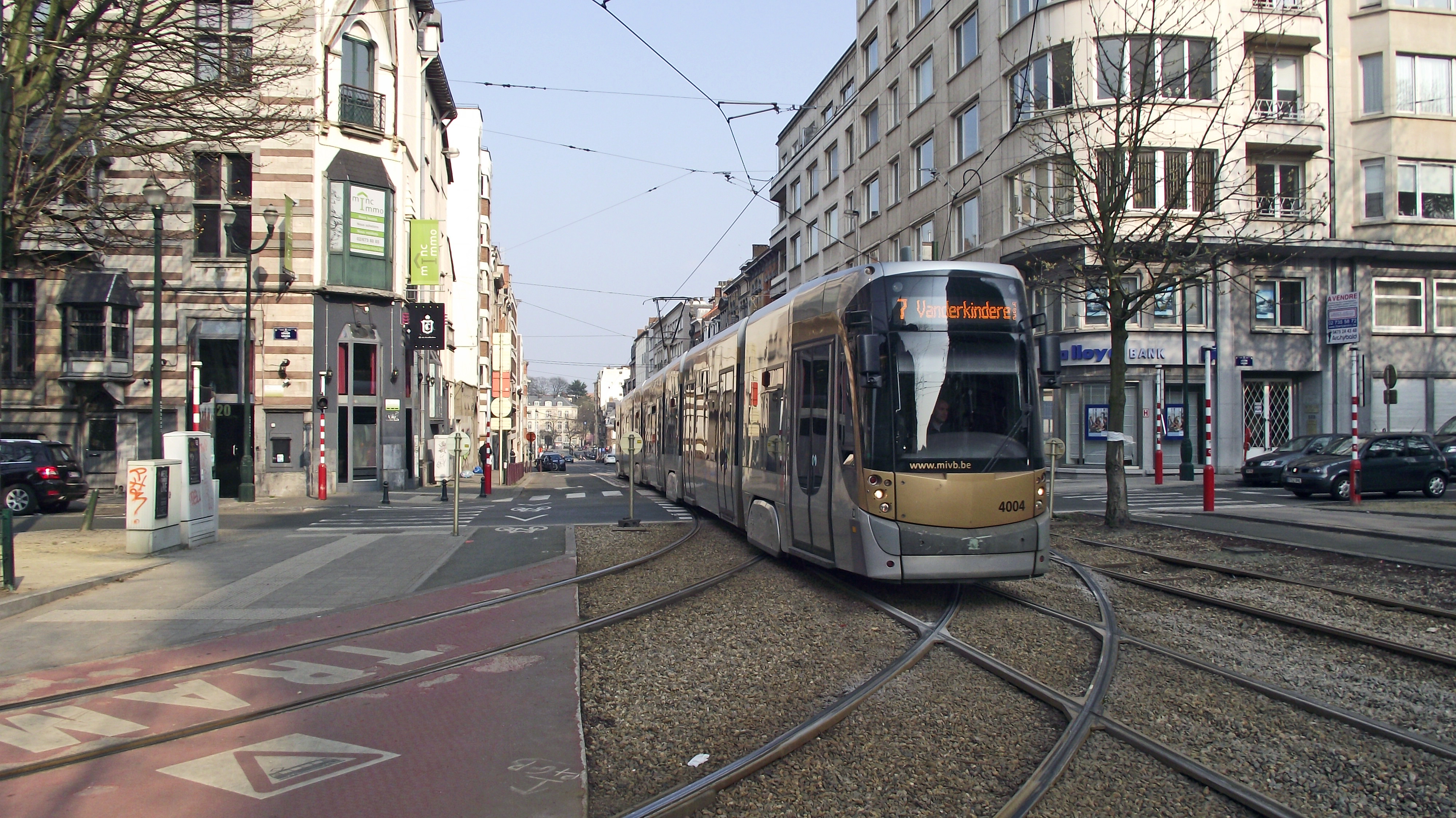
- T4004 at Legrand

Overview
- System: Brussels tramway network
- Operator: STIB/MIVB
- Depot: Ixelles
- Vehicle: T3000, T4000
- Status: Operational
- Began service: 14 March 2011

Route
- Locale: Brussels, Belgium
- Communities served: Schaerbeek; Woluwe-Saint-Lambert; Woluwe-Saint-Pierre; Etterbeek; City of Brussels; Ixelles; Uccle
- Start: Heysel/Heizel
- End: Vanderkindere
- Length: 16.0 km (9.9 mi)

Service
- Journey time: 50 minutes
Route map


The premetro and tram route 7 in Brussels, Belgium, is operated by STIB/MIVB, and connects the Vanderkindere stop in the southern municipality of Uccle to the Heysel/Heizel stop in Laeken in the City of Brussels, where connecting services of tram route 51, Metro line 6, as well as bus routes 84 and 88 depart. The colour of the signage for this line is bright yellow.

== History ==
This line was created on 14 March 2011, replacing tram routes 23 and 24. Routes 23 and 24 followed the same trajectory between the Vanderkindere and Princesse Elisabeth/Prinses Elisabeth stops, where route 23 deviated towards Schaerbeek railway station, one stop further. Together with tram routes 4, 8, 9, and 10, it is one of five 'chrono' lines, which means that it is served by low-floor high-capacity trams with a high frequency. The low line number chosen for the new line shows that it is either a metro line or a 'chrono' line.

== Route ==
Heysel/Heizel - Centenaire/Eeuwfeest - De wand - Araucaria - Buissonets/Braambosjes - Heembeek - van Praet - Docks Bruxsel - Princesse Elisabeth/Prinses Elizabeth - Demolder - Hôpital Paul Brien/Paul Brien-ziekenhuis - Louis Bertrand - Héliotropes/Heliotropen - Chazal - Léopold III/Leopold III - Meiser - Diamant - Georges Henri - Montgomery - Boileau - Pétillon - Arsenal/Arsenaal - VUB - Etterbeek Gare/Etterbeek Station - Roffiaen - Buyl - Cambre-Étoile/Ter Kameren-Ster - Legrand - Longchamp - Gossart - Cavell - Churchill - Vanderkindere.

== Frequency ==
During the daytime, a tram passes every 7½ minutes, rising to every 6 minutes during peak hours.

== Rolling stock ==
The line is fully served by the Brussels low-floor trams (the T3000 and T4000).

== See also ==
- List of Brussels tram routes
