= Théo Verbeeck =

Belgian football chairman (1889–1951)

- Théo Verbeeck

Personal information
- Full name: Theophilus Verbeeck
- Date of birth: 17 July 1889
- Place of birth: Berchem, Belgium
- Date of death: 2 August 1951 (aged 62)
- Place of death: Antwerp, Belgium
- Position: Defender

Youth career
- 1924–1933: Anderlecht

Senior career*
Years	Team	Apps	(Gls)
1907–1910	Daring Brussels		
1910–1924	Anderlecht		

Managerial career
- 1911–1951: Anderlecht (President)
- * Club domestic league appearances and goals

Theophilus Verbeeck (17 July 1889, in Berchem – 2 August 1951, in Antwerp) was a former football player and chairman, best known as chairman of Belgian club R.S.C. Anderlecht (1911–1951).

Théo Verbeeck first played for Daring Club de Bruxelles since there was no club in Anderlecht at the time, and then moved to SC Anderlechtois in 1908, when the club was founded. In 1911, he became also the chairman of the club at 23 years. Six years later Théo Verbeeck decided that his club would move to Astrid Park in Anderlecht where they still play now. In 1922 the club first reached the top level of Belgian football.

In 1942, Théo Verbeeck signed Jef Mermans, a striker with whom SC Anderlechtois would win their first Belgian title, in 1951. Days after the first title of his club, Théo Verbeeck died. He was replaced by Albert Roosens at the head of the club. The street where the Constant Vanden Stock Stadium is located was renamed after Théo Verbeeck on 2 August 1951.
