= Herrmann-Debroux metro station =

Metro station in Brussels, Belgium

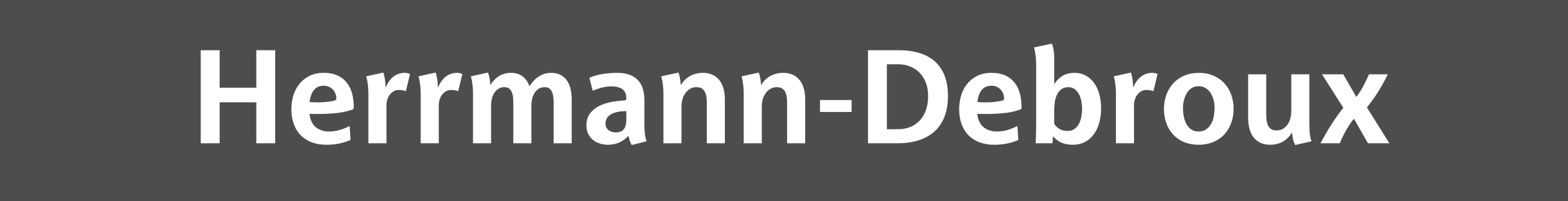

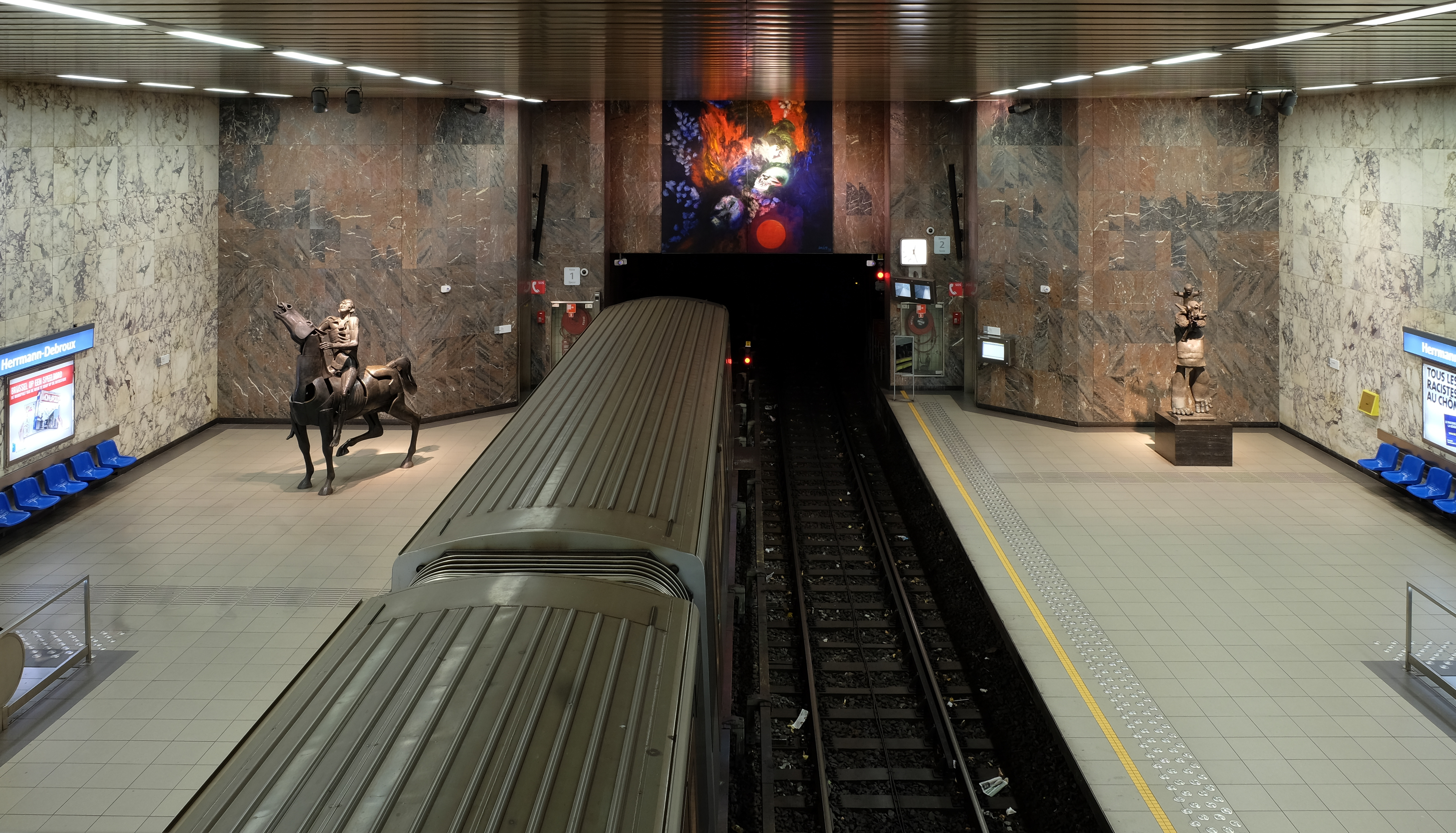
- View of the platforms from above

General information
- Location: Avenue Herrmann-Debroux / Herrmann-Debrouxlaan; 1160 Auderghem, Brussels-Capital Region, Belgium
- Coordinates: 50°48′45″N 4°25′41″E
- Owner: STIB/MIVB
- Platforms: 2
- Tracks: 2

Construction
- Structure type: Underground

History
- Opened: 23 May 1985; 41 years ago

Services
Preceding station	Brussels Metro	Following station
Demey towards Erasme/Erasmus	Line 5	Terminus
Location

Herrmann-Debroux is a Brussels Metro station serving as the eastern terminus of line 5. It is located in the municipality of Auderghem, in the south-eastern part of Brussels, Belgium. It is named after the Belgian politician and former Mayor of Auderghem, Carl Herrmann-Debroux.

The metro station opened on 23 May 1985. Then, following the reorganisation of the Brussels Metro on 4 April 2009, it is served by the extended east–west line 5.

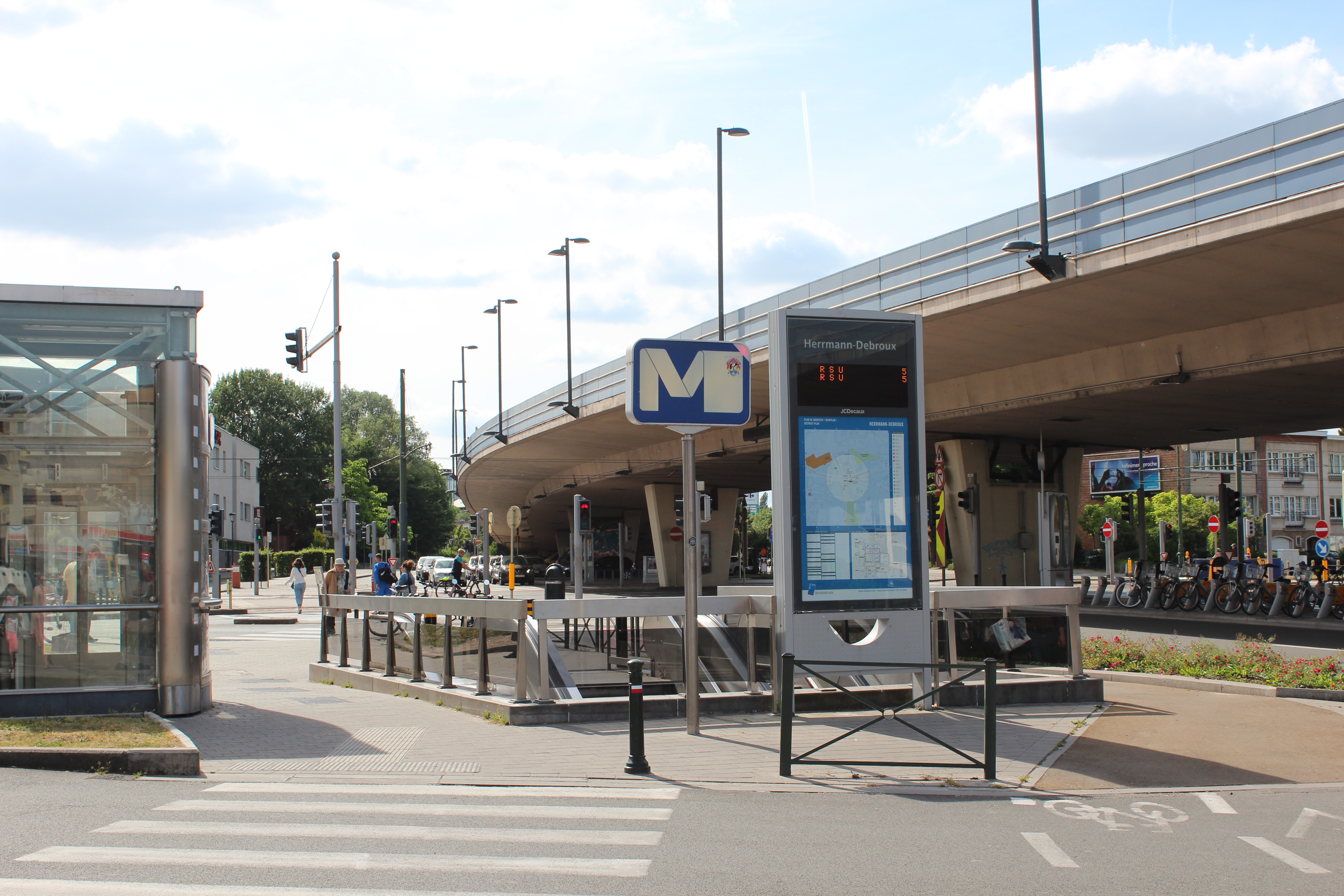
Entrance by escalator or lift

== Artworks ==
Herrmann-Debroux currently hosts three artworks from 1985: a painting named The Fall of Troy by Jan Cox themed after the Iliad, a sculpture named L'Aviateur by Roel D’Haese on the arrival side, and a sculpture named Ode aan een bergrivier by Rik Poot on the departure side.

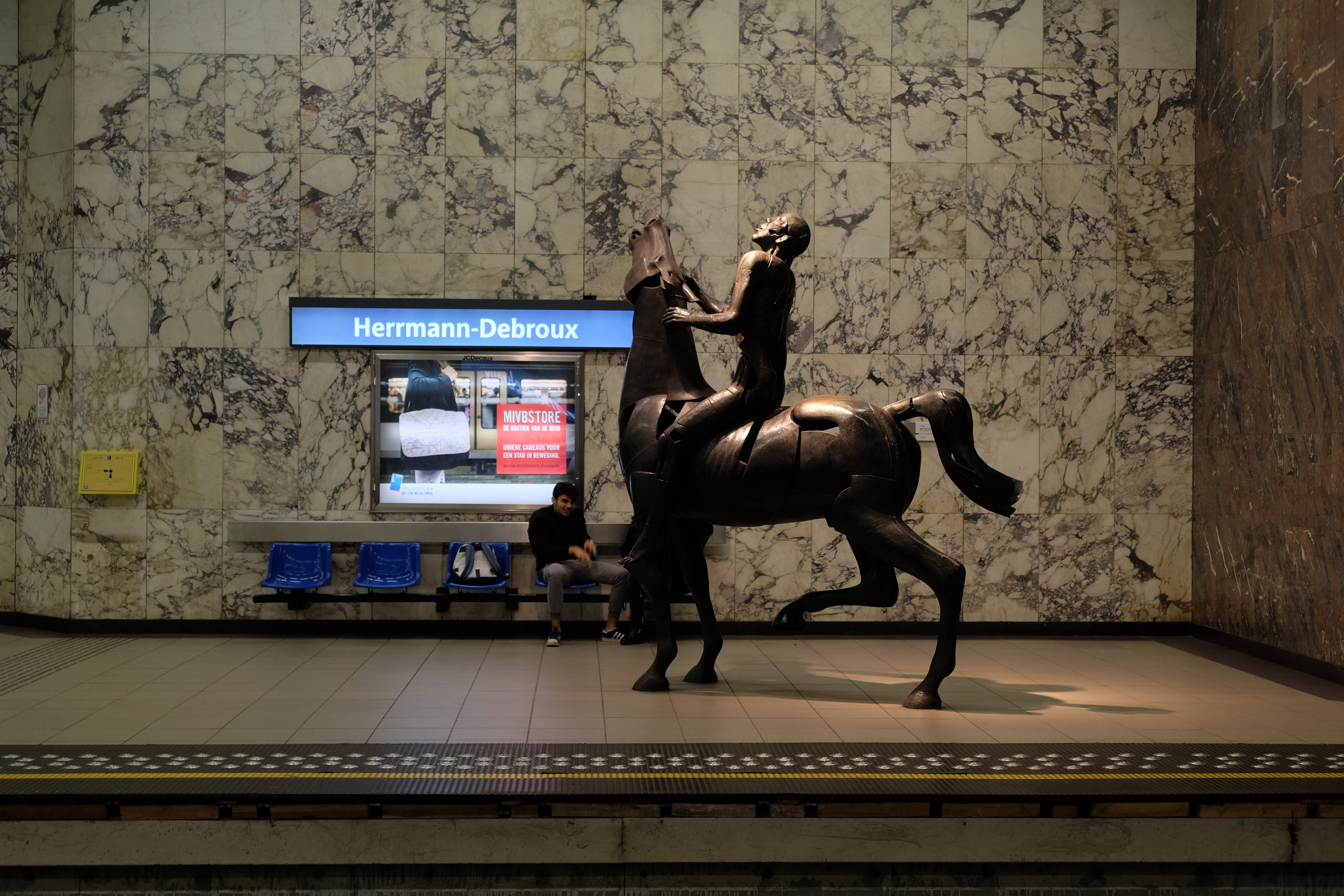
Ode aan een bergrivier by Rik Poot (1985)

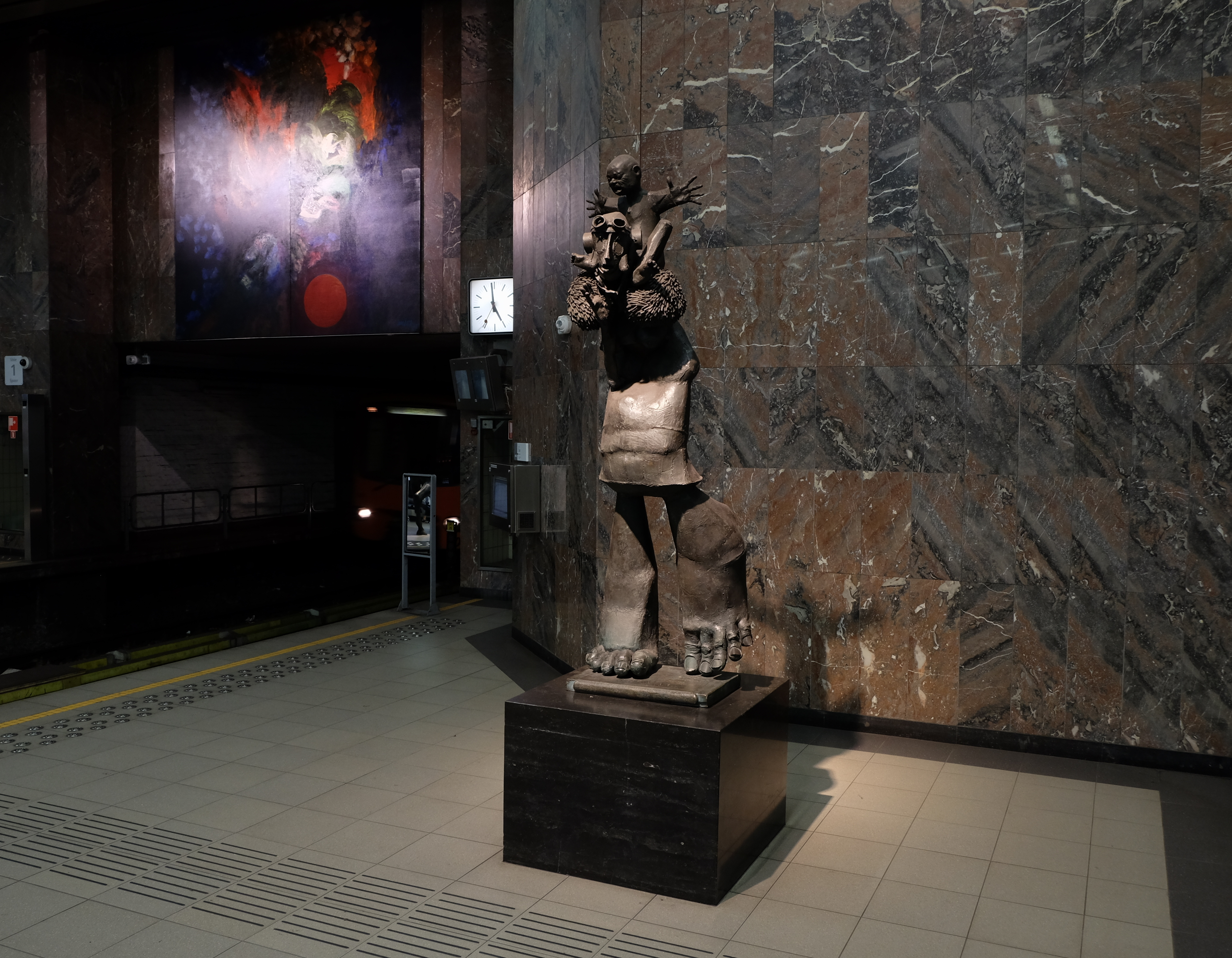
L'Aviateur by Roel D'Haese (1985)

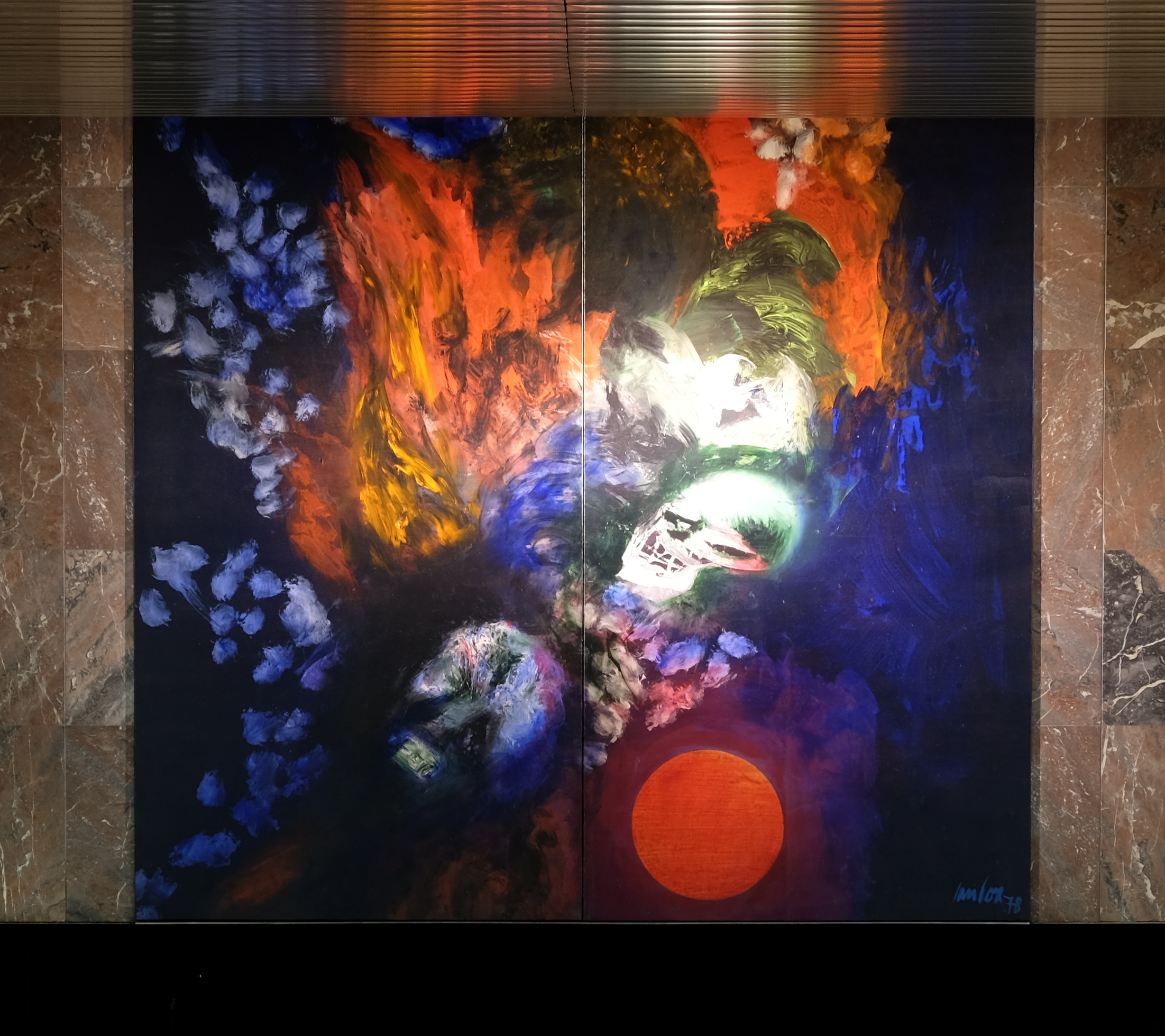
The Fall of Troy by Jan Cox

== See also ==
- Transport in Brussels
- History of Brussels
