= Brussels tram route 25 =

Tram route in Brussels, Belgium

STIB/MIVB Route 25
- Gare du Nord/Noordstation – Stalle Parking

Overview
- System: Brussels tramway network
- Operator: STIB/MIVB
- Depot: Haren, Ixelles, Schaerbeek
- Vehicle: T3000
- Status: Operational
- Began service: 16 April 2007

Route
- Locale: Brussels, Belgium
- Communities served: Ixelles; Etterbeek; Woluwe-Saint-Lambert; Woluwe-Saint-Pierre; Schaerbeek; Saint-Josse-ten-Noode
- Start: Rogier
- Via: Greater Ring
- End: Boondael Station
- Length: 11.6 km (7.2 mi)

Service
- Journey time: 50 minutes
Route map


The tram route 25 in Brussels, Belgium, is operated by STIB/MIVB, and connects Rogier metro station in the municipality of Saint-Josse-ten-Noode to Boondael railway station in the municipality of Ixelles.

== History ==
The line was created in April 2007 during the reorganisation of public transport in Brussels, replacing tram routes 90 and 93.

In 2022, STIB/MIVB announced it would redirect tram 25 towards Alma via the Brussels Mediapark. In 2023, STIB/MIVB announced further plans to split the line into two different lines, which was protested by affected citizens. The plans were changed so line 25 will not change, but it will sometimes be redirected to Esplanade, while line 11 will take over the part from Rogier to Meiser railway station and continue to Haren Bourget.

== Route ==
Stops
Stop Name	Correspondences
Rogier	
Gare du Nord/Noordstation	
Thomas	
Lefranq	
Robiano	
Coteaux/Wijnheuvelen	
Bienfaiteurs/Welldoeners
Patrie/Vaderland
Meiser
Meiser	
Diamant
Georges Henri
Montgomery	
Boileau	
Pétillon	
Arsenal/Arsenaal	
VUB
Etterbeek Gare/Etterbeek Station
Roffiaen
Buyl	
Jeanne	
ULB
Solbosch/Solbos
Marie-José
Brésil/Brazilië
Boondael Gare/Boondaal Station

== See also ==
- List of Brussels tram routes
