= Besme =

Bohemian noble, murderer of admiral Coligny

Besme, also called Behmef, real name apparently Charles Dianovitz (Czech: Karel z Janovic), was a Bohemian in the pay of the Duke of Guise, who is recorded as the assassin of Protestant leader Gaspard de Coligny in 1572, using either a dagger or a "big sword". The assassin group called itself Picards de Bohème.

Later subsequently was made prisoner while warring against the Protestants of Saintonge, who put him to death.

He is mentioned once in The Three Musketeers.
