= Diamant premetro station =

Premetro station in Brussels, Belgium

Coordinates: 50.84933°N 4.40175°E

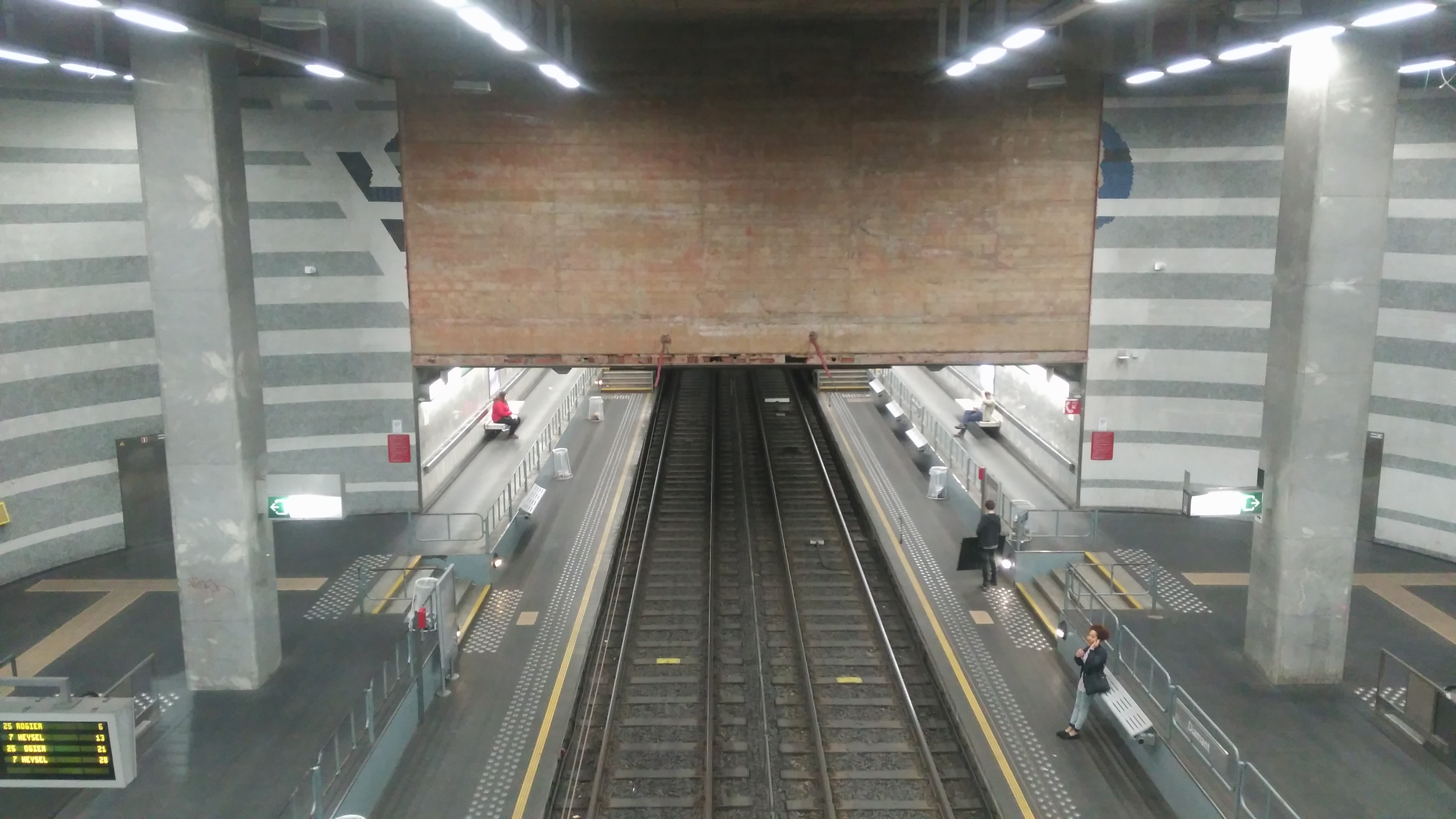
Diamant premetro station

Diamant is a premetro (underground tram) station located in the municipality of Schaerbeek in Brussels, Belgium. The station opened on 2 May 1972. It is one of four stations of the so-called Greater Ring premetro axis built in the 1970s, which runs under the Greater Ring (Brussels' second ring road). This underground station is currently served by tram routes 7 and 25. It offers a connection with bus routes 12, 21, 28, 29 and 79 at ground level.

The station gets its name from the Avenue Diamant/Diamantlaan. It is located at the crossroad between this avenue, the Greater Ring, the Avenue des Cerisiers/Kerselarenlaan and the Avenue de Roodebeek/Roodebeeklaan, next to the buildings of the public broadcasters, the Dutch-language VRT and the French-language RTBF. It was built at the same time as the E40 motorway, which ends there and splits into several tunnels and off-ramps.

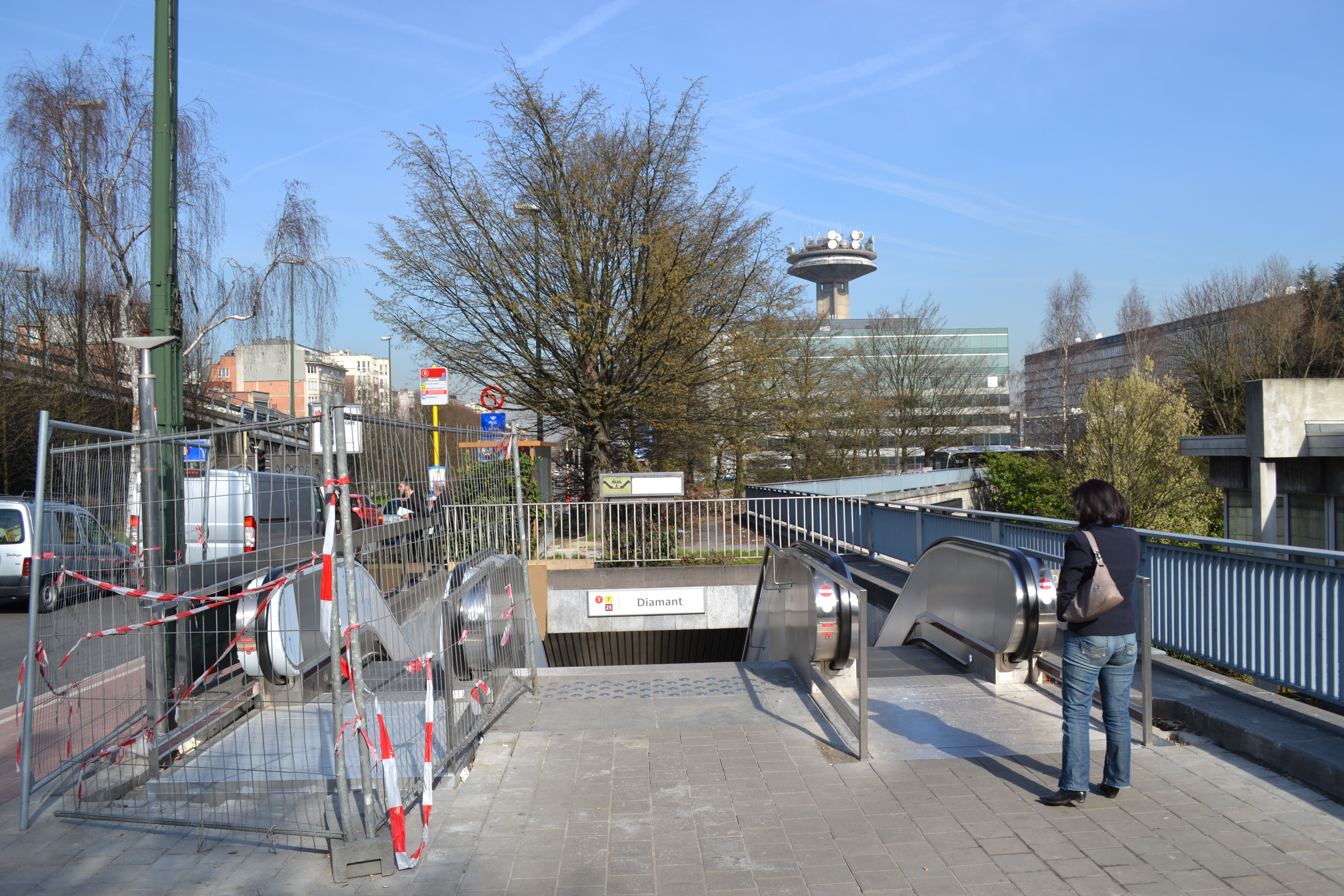
Entrance with the Reyers Tower in the background

== See also ==
- Transport in Brussels
- History of Brussels
