= Boileau premetro station =

Premetro station in Brussels, Belgium

Coordinates: 50.83222°N 4.405°E

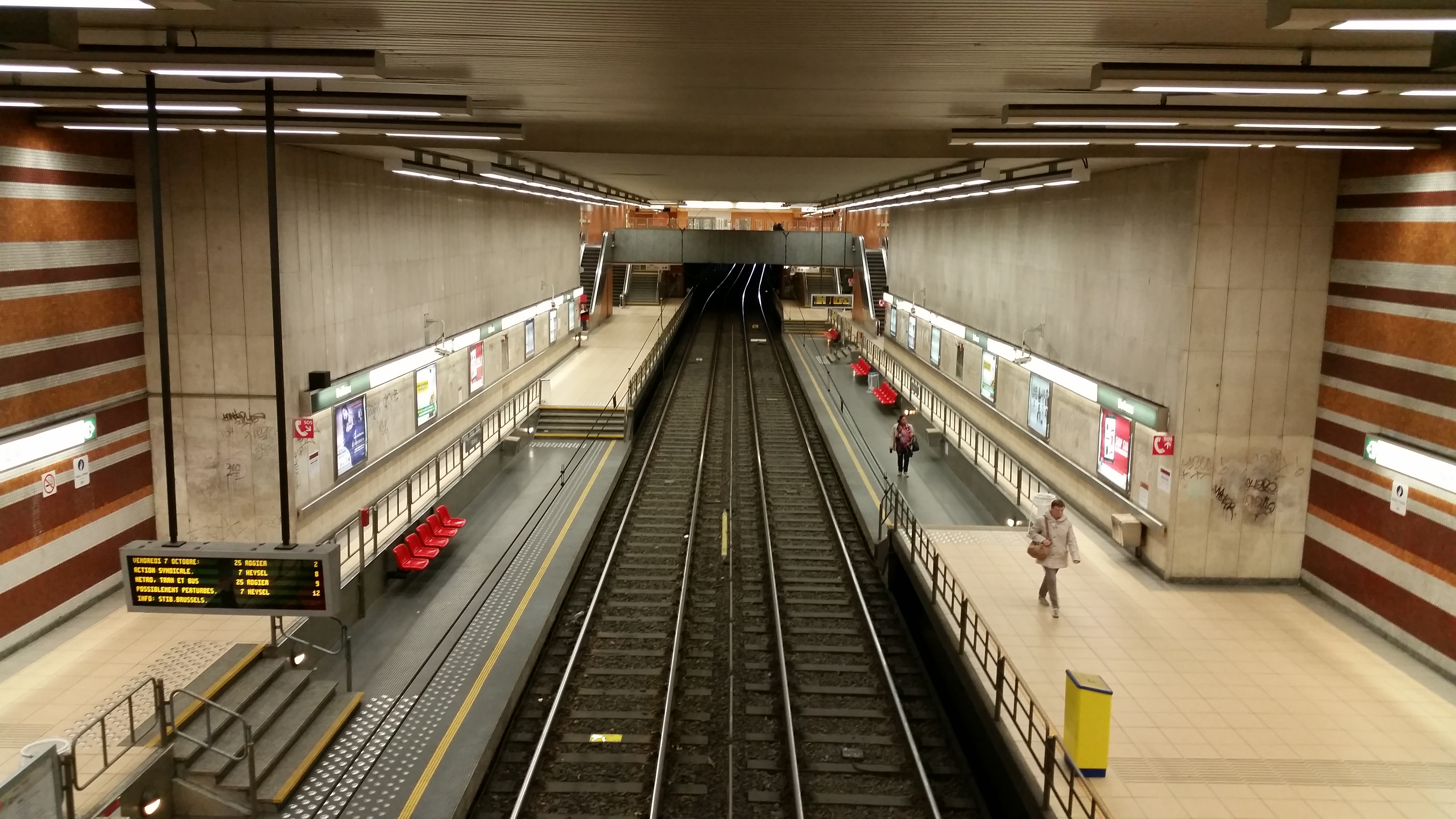
Boileau premetro station

Boileau (French pronunciation: [bwalo]) is a premetro (underground tram) station located in the municipality of Etterbeek in Brussels, Belgium. The station opened on 30 January 1975. Named for the nearby Rue Boileau/Boileaustraat, it is situated on the Boulevard Saint-Michel/Sint-Michielslaan section of the Greater Ring, adjacent to the Boileau tunnel. It is the southernmost and last of the four stations on the Greater Ring premetro, connected by Montgomery metro station to the north and the street-level tram halts at Pétillon metro station to the south. The station is served by the 7 and 25 trams and the 36 bus. Thieffry metro station is situated close by to the west.

== See also ==
- Transport in Brussels
- History of Brussels
