= Greater Ring, Brussels =

Intermediate ring road of Brussels, Belgium

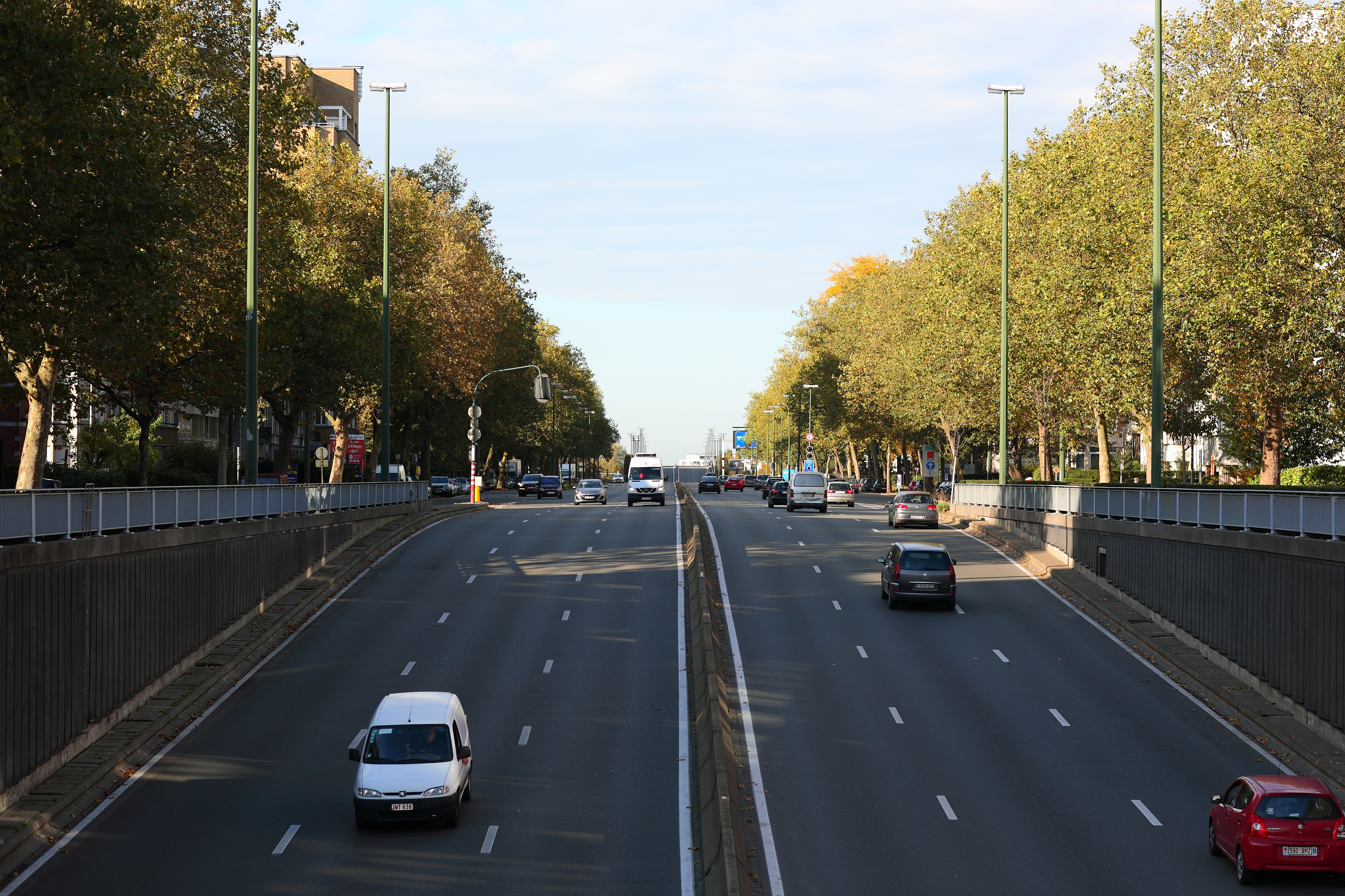
Entrance to the Georges Henri tunnel at the R21 road in Brussels

The Greater Ring or Intermediate Ring (French: Moyenne Ceinture, pronounced [mwajɛn sɛ̃tyʁ]; Dutch: Middenring, pronounced [ˈmɪdə(n)ˌrɪŋ]) is a series of roadways in Brussels, Belgium, intermediate between the Small Ring and the main Brussels Ring motorway. Most of this set of roads is numbered R21 and is about 30 km (19 mi) long, compared to 8 km (5.0 mi) for the Small Ring and 80 km (50 mi) for the main Ring.

This road crosses two motorways (A12 and E40-east) and offers a connection to the A10/E40-west at Basilique/Basiliek via the Avenue Charles Quint/Keizer Karellaan, to the A12 at Gros Tilleul/Dikke Linde, to the E19-north and N22/A201 at Leopold III via the Boulevard Léopold III/Leopold III-laan, to the A3/E40-east at Reyers, to the E411 at Arsena(a)l via the Boulevard du Triomphe/Triomflaan and to the E19-south at Paepsem via the Boulevard Industriel/Industrielaan.

The road passes through tunnels (Boileau tunnel, Montgomery tunnel, Georges Henri tunnel), on bridges and viaducts (e.g. Diamant viaduct, Teichmann bridge and Van Praet bridge) and under bridges and viaducts (e.g. Luttre bridge). Among those bridges, seven cross railroads and two cross the Brussels–Scheldt Maritime Canal. Tunnels and the Diamant viaduct are used to avoid crossroads. The Greater Ring runs along many parks: the Royal Domain, Josaphat Park, Forest Park, Astrid Park, Scheutbos Park, Elisabeth Park, and Laeken Park. It also crosses the Bois de la Cambre/Ter Kamerenbos.

The road goes through 14 municipalities out of the 19 that make up the Brussels-Capital Region: the City of Brussels, Schaerbeek, Woluwe-Saint-Lambert, Woluwe-Saint-Pierre, Etterbeek, Ixelles, Uccle, Forest, Saint-Gilles (clockwise only), Anderlecht, Molenbeek-Saint-Jean, Koekelberg, Ganshoren, and Jette.

== Crossroads ==
The Greater Ring counts 15 main crossroads with other main roads in Brussels. Starting from the north and going clockwise, those crossroads are:

- Gros Tilleul/Dikke Linde: where motorway A12 starts, leading to Antwerp via Willebroek
- Van Praet: crossroad with the Quai des Usines/Werkhuizenkaai (the road along the Brussels–Scheldt Maritime Canal) and the Avenue de Vilvorde/Vilvoordselaan (N1 road leading to Antwerp via Mechelen)
- Josaphat: crossroad with Avenue Chazal/Chazallaan located at the eastern end of Josaphat Park
- Meiser: crossroad with the Chaussée de Louvain/Leuvensesteenweg (N2 road) as well as the Avenue Rogier/Rogierlaan and the Avenue Eugène Plasky/Eugène Plaskylaan
- Reyers: where motorway A3, leading to E40, starts; connecting to Germany via Leuven and Liège, this is also the crossroad with the Avenue de Roodebeek/Roodebeeklaan, the Avenue des cerisiers/Kerselarenlaan and the Avenue du Diamant/Diamantlaan; the Belgian national radios and televisions (RTBF and VRT) are also located next to this intersection
- Montgomery: crossroad with the Avenue de Tervueren/Tervurenlaan (N3 road) and the Avenue de Broqueville/De Broquevillelaan
- Arsenal/Arsenaal: crossroad with the Chaussée de Wavre (N4 road) and the Boulevard du Triomphe/Triomflaan
- Couronne/Kroon: crossroad with the Avenue de la Couronne/Kroonlaan
- La Cambre/Ter Kameren: crossroad with the Avenue Louise/Louizalaan, where the Greater Ring enters the Bois de La Cambre/Ter Kameren Bos
- Vanderkindere: crossroad with the Avenue Brugmann/Brugmannlaan and the Rue Vanderkindere/Vanderkinderelaan
- Albert: crossroad with the Chaussée d'Alsemberg/Alsembergse Steenweg
- Paepsem: crossroad with the Boulevard Industriel/Industrielaan
- Dupuis: crossroad with the Boulevard Sylvain Dupuis/Sylvain Dupuislaan
- Prince de Liège/Prins van Luik: crossroad with the Chaussée de Ninove/Ninoofsesteenweg (N8 road) and the Boulevard Prince de Liège/Prins van Luiklaan
- Basilique/Basiliek: crossroad with the Boulevard Léopold II/Leopold II-laan next to the Basilica

== Road names ==
The roads that form the Greater Ring are the following, starting from the Gros Tilleul/Dikke Linde crossroad and going clockwise:

- Avenue Van Praet/Van Praetlaan (going southeast) and Avenue des Croix du Feu/Vuurkruisenlaan (going northwest)
- Boulevard Lambermont/Lambermontlaan
- Boulevard Général Wahis/Generaal Wahislaan
- Boulevard Auguste Reyers/Auguste Reyerslaan
- Boulevard Brand Whitlock/Brand Whitlocklaan
- Boulevard Saint-Michel/Sint-Michielslaan
- Boulevard Louis Schmidt/Louis Schmidtlaan
- Boulevard Général Jacques/Generaal Jacqueslaan
- Avenue du Congo/Congolaan
- Avenue Lloyd George/Lloyd Georgelaan
- Avenue de Flore/Floralaan
- Avenue de Diane/Dianalaan
- Avenue de la Lisière
- Avenue Winston Churchill/Winston Churchilllaan
- Avenue Albert/Albertlaan
- Avenue Besme/Besmelaan and then Avenue Reine Marie-Henriette/Koningin Maria-Hendrikalaan (going northwest) or Avenue des Villas and then Avenue du Mont Kemmel (going southeast)
- Avenue Wielemans Ceuppens/Wielemans Ceuppenslaan
- Avenue du Pont de Luttre/Luttrebruglaan
- Rue du Charroi/Gerijstraat
- Boulevard Paepsem/Paepsemlaan
- Avenue Frans Van Kalken/Frans Van Kalkenlaan

At this point the Greater Ring is discontinued but can be joined via the Boulevard Briand Aristide/Briand Aristidelaan, the Avenue Eugène Ysaÿe/Eugène Ysayelaan and the Avenue Théo Verbeeck/Théo Verbeecklaan. Then the Greater Ring resumes:

- Rue René Henry/René Henrystraat
- Rue de la Compétition
- Boulevard Maria Groeninckx De May/Maria Groeninckx De Maylaan
- Boulevard de la Grande Ceinture/Grote Ringlaan
- Boulevard Louis Mettewie/Louis Mettewielaan
- Avenue Emile Bossaert/Emile Bossaertlaan
- Avenue Jacques Sermon/Jacques Sermonlaan
- Avenue de Laeken/Lakenselaan
- Boulevard de Smet de Naeyer/De Smet de Naeyerlaan
- Avenue des Robiniers/Witte Acacialaan
- Avenue du Parc Royal/Koninklijk Parklaan

== Public transport ==
The Greater Ring is extensively used by public transport. Between Boileau and Diamant, four underground tram stations (Boileau, Montgomery, Georges Henry and Diamant) are connected by a tunnel for trams, which lies under the Greater Ring. This tunnel is used by tram routes 7 and 25. Albert underground tram station is also located under the Greater Ring at the Albert crossroad, where the tram routes 3 and 4 join the Greater Ring, route 3 stopping three stops later at Churchill whereas route 4 leaves the Ring two stops later at Vanderkindere.

Tram route 7 (previously 23/24) actually starts at the Vanderkindere crossing and follows the Greater Ring up to Gros Tilleul (De Wand stop), only to leave the Greater Ring after having crossed the Royal Domain to end at Heysel. This makes it the route which drives the most along the Ring. Former route 24 also started at Vanderkindere and ran up to Princesse Elisabeth stop only to terminate at the next stop at Schaerbeek railway station. Route 25 joins the Ring at Buyl stop coming from Boondael railway station, follows it up to Meiser stop and terminates at Rogier metro station.

Bus route 49 follows the Ring on two occasions, first as it joins the Rue du Pont de Luttre at stop Wiels, coming from Brussels-South railway station. It then leaves the Ring at Veeweyde metro station, to come back at stop Peterbos up to stop Leopold I.

== See also ==
- List of streets in Brussels
- History of Brussels
- Belgium in the long nineteenth century
