= Heysel metro station =

Metro station in Brussels, Belgium

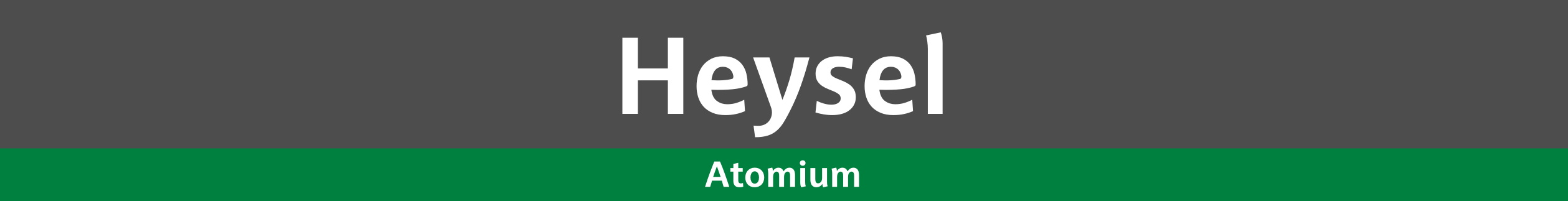
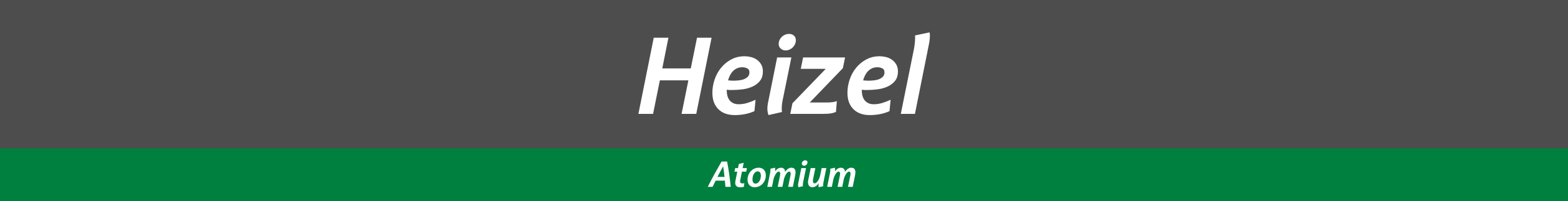

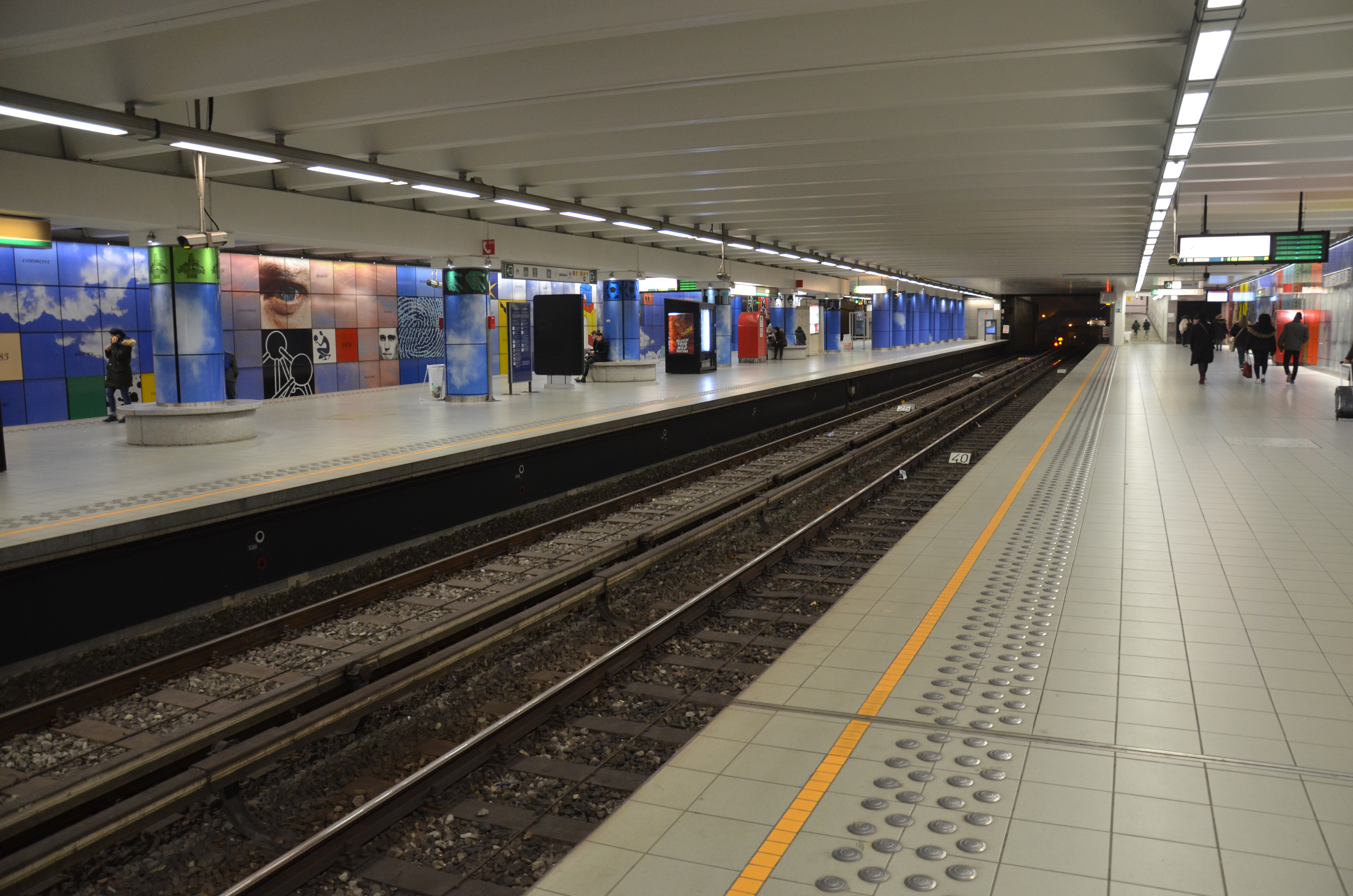
- Heysel/Heizel metro station

General information
- Location: Avenue des Athlètes / Atletenlaan; 1020 Laeken, City of Brussels, Brussels-Capital Region, Belgium
- Coordinates: 50°53′48″N 4°20′11″E
- Owner: STIB/MIVB
- Platforms: 2
- Tracks: 3

Construction
- Structure type: Underground

History
- Opened: 5 July 1985; 41 years ago

Services
Preceding station	Brussels Metro	Following station
Houba-Brugmann towards Elisabeth	Line 6	King Baudouin Terminus
Location

Heysel (French, pronounced [ɛzɛl]) or Heizel (Dutch, pronounced [ˈɦɛizəl]) is a Brussels Metro station on the northern branch of line 6. It is located in Laeken, in the north-west of the City of Brussels, Belgium, and serves the Heysel/Heizel Plateau, the site of the world's fairs of 1935 and 1958, the King Baudouin Stadium (formerly known as the Heysel Stadium) and the Atomium. The Bruparck entertainment park (with among others Mini-Europe miniature park and Kinepolis cinema) and the Centenary Palace, home to the Brussels Exhibition Centre (Brussels Expo), are also located nearby.

The metro station opened on 5 July 1985 as part of the Bockstael–Heysel/Heizel extension of former line 1A, and until 1998, it was the northern terminus of the metro. On 25 August 1998, the line was further extended to Roi Baudouin/Koning Boudewijn for the 2000 UEFA European Football Championship. Then, following the reorganisation of the Brussels Metro on 4 April 2009, it is served by line 6. It offers a connection with tram route 7, as well as bus routes 84 and 88.

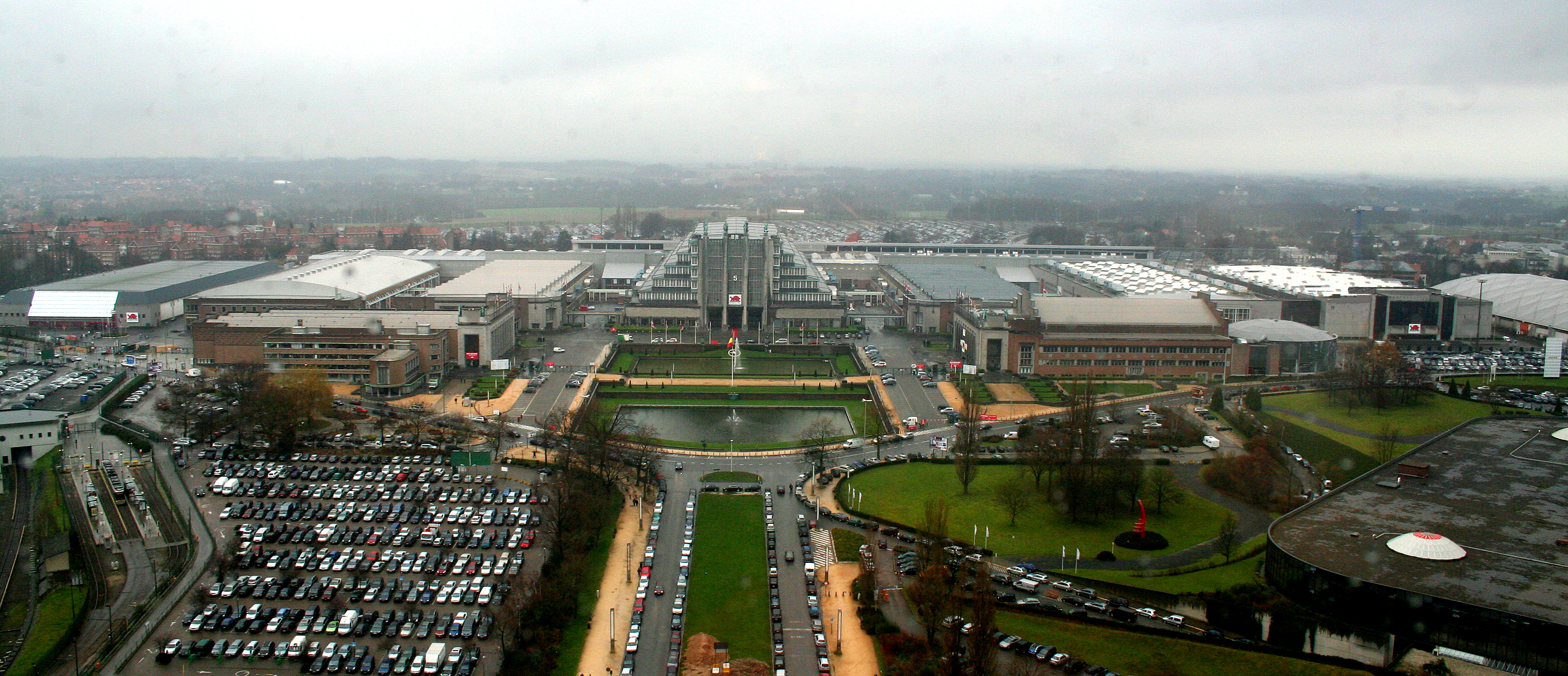
The Heysel/Heizel Plateau viewed from the top of the Atomium

== See also ==
- Transport in Brussels
- History of Brussels
