= Brussels Stock Exchange =

Stock exchange in Brussels, Belgium

Coordinates: 50°50′50″N 4°21′32″E

Euronext Brussels

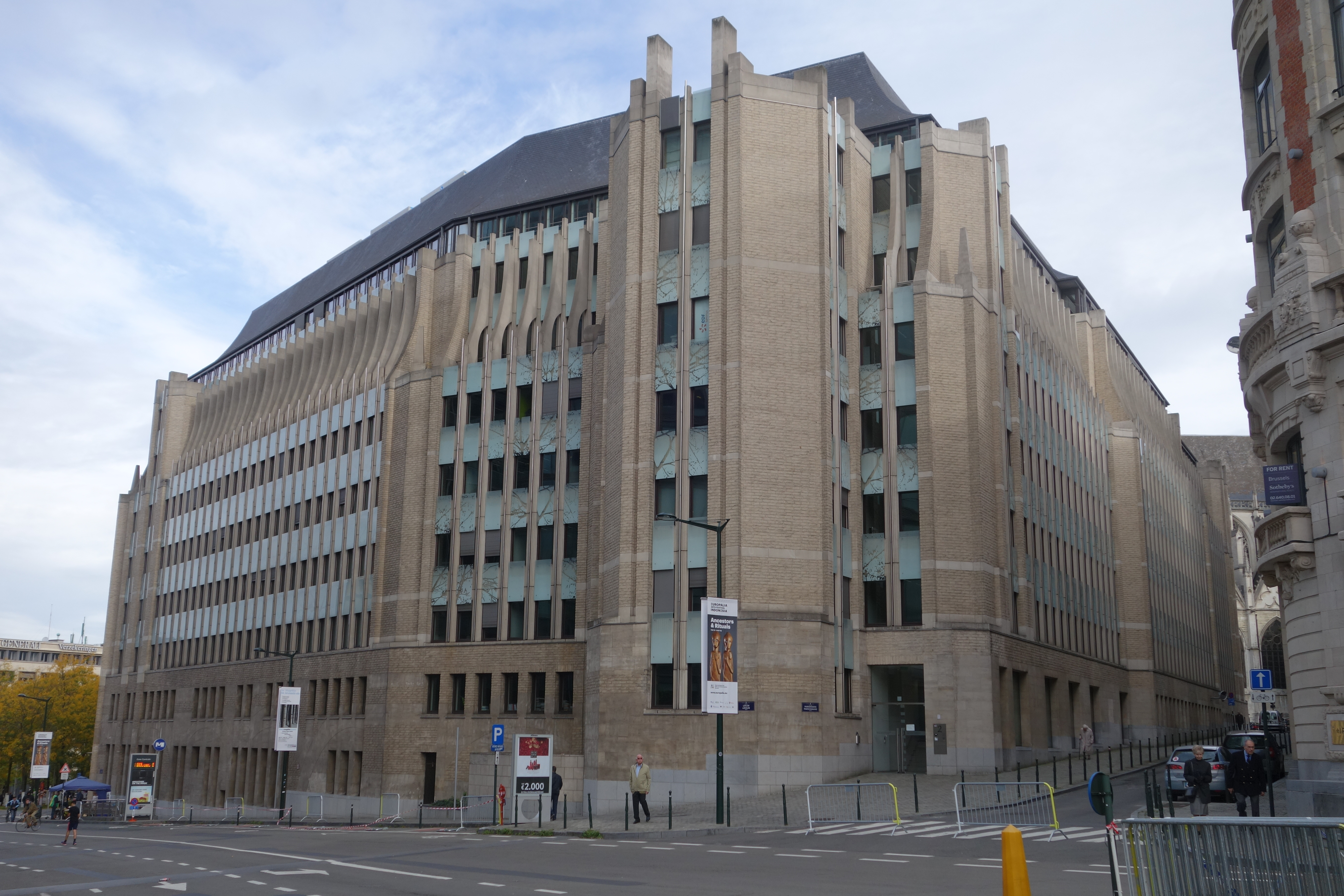
- The Marquis building, housing the Brussels Stock Exchange (BSE)
- Type: Stock exchange
- Location: Brussels, Belgium
- Founded: 8 July 1801; 225 years ago
- Owner: Euronext
- Key people: Vincent Van Dessel (CEO)
- Currency: EUR
- No. of listings: 142
- Indices: BEL 20
- Website: live.euronext.com/en/markets/brussels

The Brussels Stock Exchange (French: Bourse de Bruxelles [buʁs də bʁysɛl]; Dutch: Beurs van Brussel [ˈbøːrs fɑm ˈbrʏsəl]), abbreviated to BSE, is a stock exchange founded in Brussels, Belgium, by decree of Napoleon in 1801. In 2000, the BSE merged with the Amsterdam, Lisbon and Paris stock exchanges into Euronext, renaming the BSE Euronext Brussels. The benchmark stock market index on the BSE is the BEL 20.

The former Brussels Stock Exchange building, known as the Bourse Palace (French: Palais de la Bourse; Dutch: Beurspaleis) and usually shortened to la Bourse (in French) or de Beurs (in Dutch), is located on the Place de la Bourse/Beursplein along the Boulevard Anspach/Anspachlaan. The BSE is now headquartered in the Marquis building.

== History ==
=== Inception and early history ===
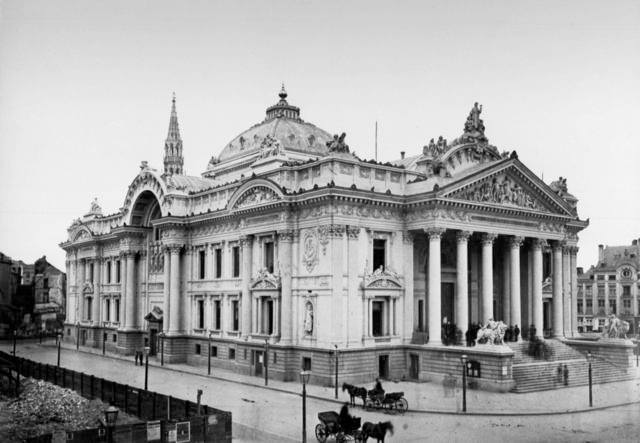
The former Brussels Stock Exchange building in 1873, shortly after completion

The Brussels Stock Exchange (French: Bourse de Commerce de Bruxelles) was created in 1801 by decree of Napoleon. The French government at the time designated the former Augustinian monastery on the Rue Fossé aux Loups/Wolvengracht as the venue for this exchange. After the monastery buildings were sold, meetings were allowed to be held in the Theatre of La Monnaie, but when the theatre was reopened for performing arts in 1820, the stockbrokers rented a house on the Rue Guillaume/Willemstraat (today's Rue Léopold/Leopoldstraat). From 1858, a time when it experienced considerable development following the country's economic and industrial growth, the cramped and unsanitary conditions of the various premises led the business community to demand, from the municipal authorities, the erection of a new stock exchange (see below).

=== Challenges, mergers and relocation ===
On the night of 29 November 1990, a fire broke out in one of the stockbrokers' cabins on the ground floor of the Stock Exchange building, causing a lot of damage. As a result, the BSE risked losing its financial activities and its reason for existence. Though the building was neatly restored, automation and acquisitions were already bringing an end to old market practices. In July 1996, all market floor activities disappeared. That year, the cash market was fully digitalised and the daily meeting of stockbrokers and traders therefore became redundant.

In 1999, a first merger took place with CIK and BELFOX (BELgian Futures and Options Exchange). On 22 September 2000, the BSE merged again with Paris Bourse and the Amsterdam Stock Exchange to form Euronext, the first pan-European exchange for equities and derivatives, with common trading and clearing of all products, and was renamed Euronext Brussels. In 2015, this company moved away from the Stock Exchange building, which had become too large, after the lease was broken by the City of Brussels in 2012. It now has its headquarters in the Marquis building.

== Structure and indices ==
Euronext Brussels calculates a family of indices. The BEL 20 is the exchange's benchmark, disseminated in real time. Other indices include the BEL Mid, Bel-Small, and BAS indexes.

== Former building ==
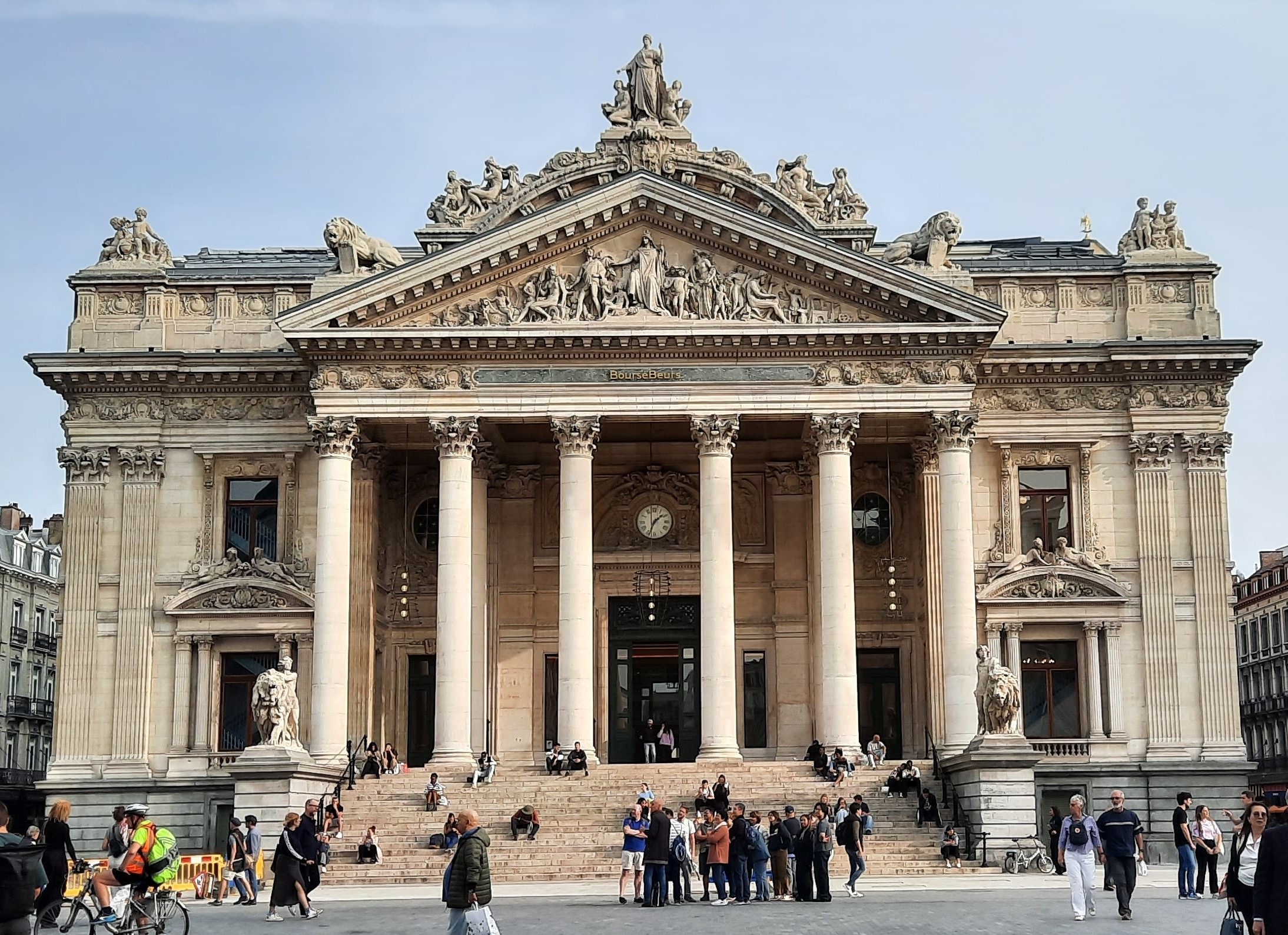
Front view of the former building on the Place de la Bourse/Beursplein

The former Brussels Stock Exchange building is officially called the Palais de la Bourse in French or the Beurspaleis in Dutch (or simply la Bourse/de Beurs, respectively), meaning "Stock Exchange Palace". In English, the building does not have a distinct name, though it is usually called the Bourse Palace, or simply the Bourse. It is located on the Boulevard Anspach/Anspachlaan, and is the namesake of the Place de la Bourse/Beursplein.

Designed by the architect Léon-Pierre Suys, in an eclectic style mixing borrowings from neo-Renaissance and Second Empire architecture, the building was erected from 1868 to 1873 on the site of the former Butter Market, itself built over the remains of the 13th-century Recollets Franciscan convent. It has an abundance of ornaments and sculptures, created by famous artists, including the brothers Jacques and Joseph Jacquet, Guillaume de Groot, the French sculptor Albert-Ernest Carrier-Belleuse and his then-assistant Auguste Rodin.

== See also ==
- Euro.nm
- Euronext 100
- History of Brussels
- Belgium in the long nineteenth century
