= Belgian Beer World =

Beer museum in Brussels, Belgium

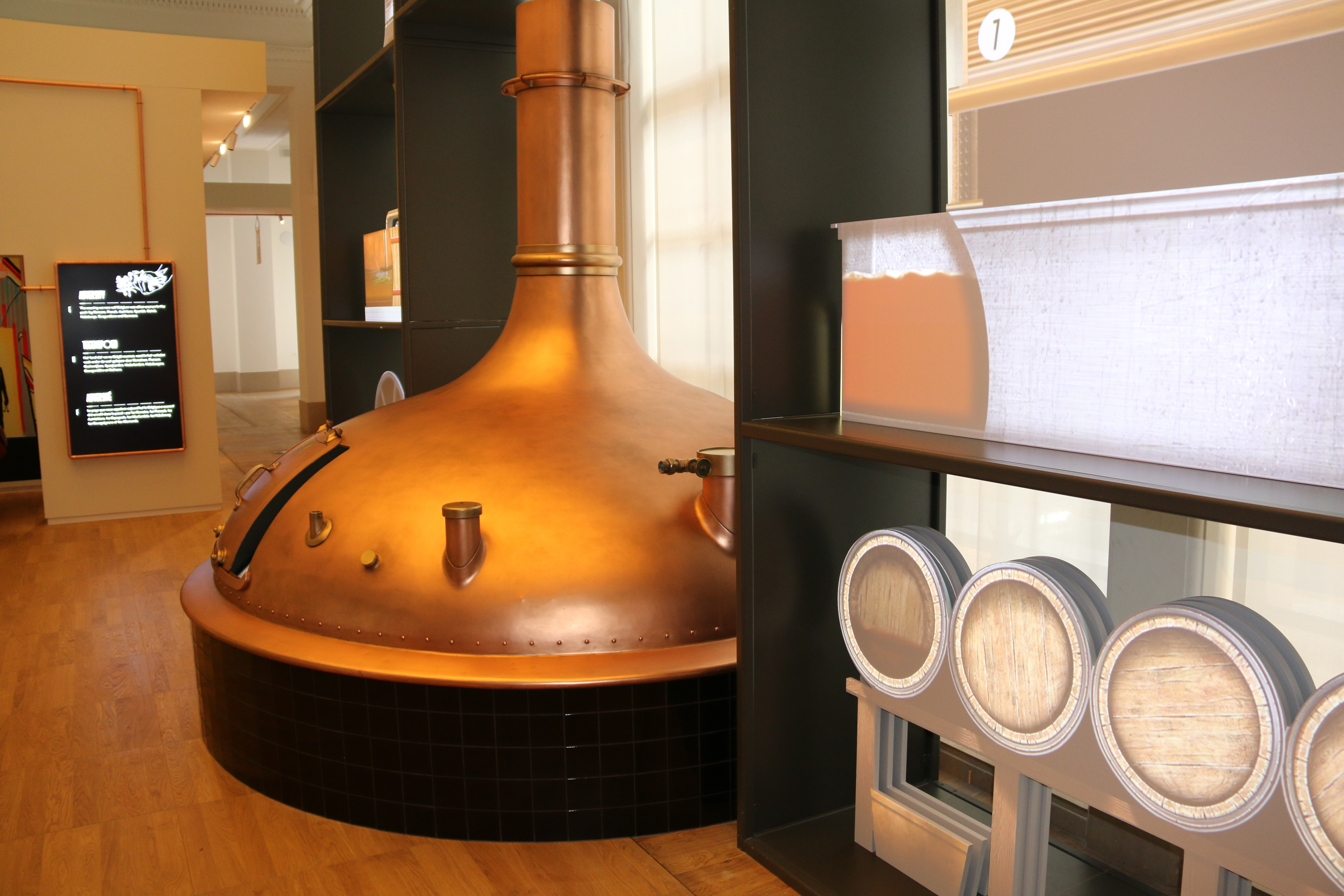
- Interior of the museum
- Interactive fullscreen map
- Coordinates: 50°50′53″N 4°21′01″E
- Type: Beer museum
- Website: www.belgianbeerworld.be/en

Belgian Beer World is a museum and visitor experience centre in Brussels, Belgium, devoted to Belgian beer culture. It is housed in the upper floors of the Bourse Palace (former Brussels Stock Exchange building). The museum was opened in September 2023.

== Background ==
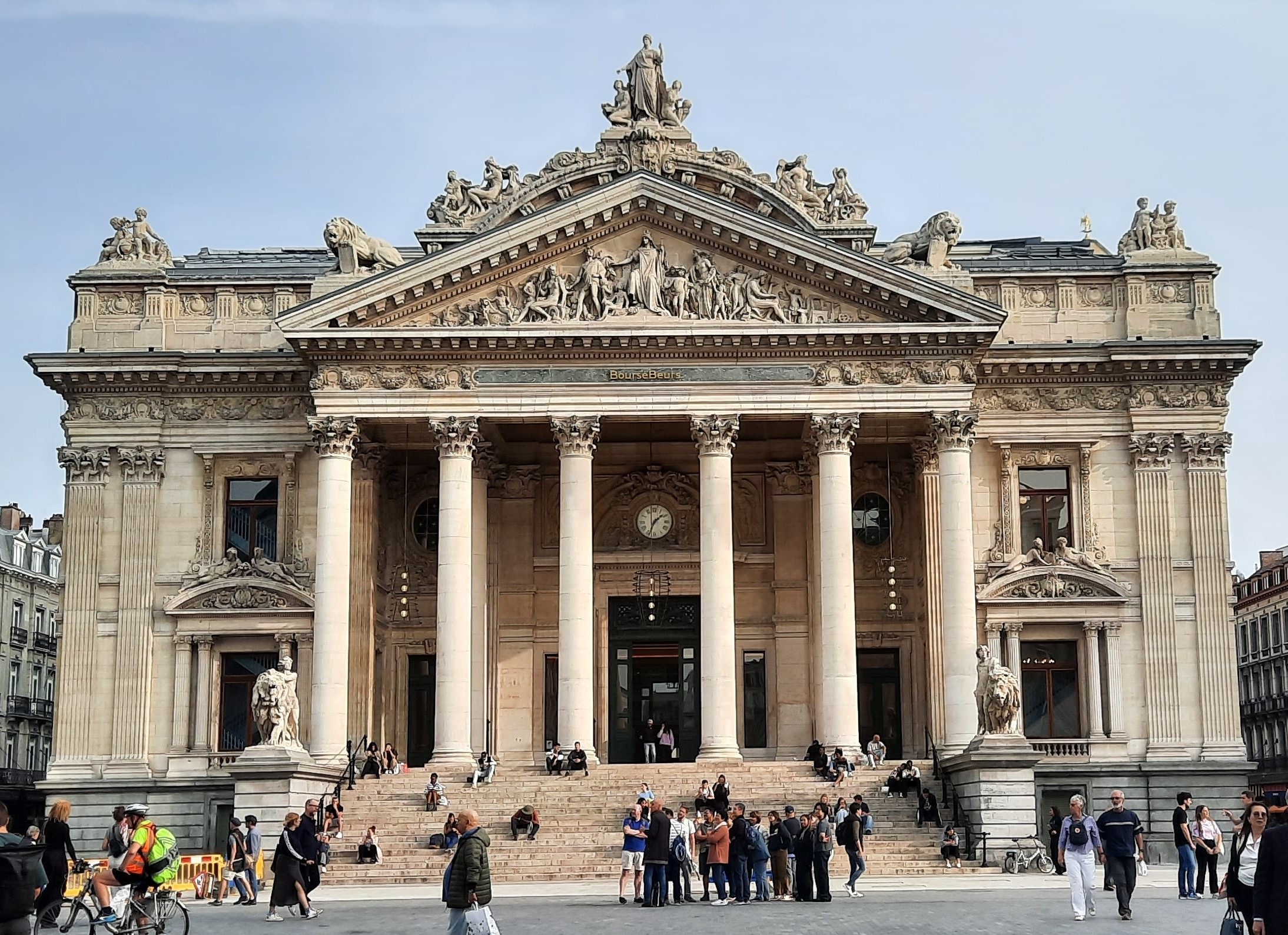
The Bourse Palace, housing Belgian Beer World

The Bourse Palace stands on the Place de la Bourse/Beursplein in central Brussels and has been owned by the City of Brussels since 2011. The historic Beaux-Arts building was used for exchange activities until 2015, after which it hosted only temporary exhibitions. On the initiative of local politicians and the Belgian Brewers association, a project was launched to partly repurpose the building as an experience centre focused on the heritage of Belgian beer culture, which UNESCO recognises as intangible cultural heritage.

The museum project was initially called "Belgian Beer Temple", then "Belgian Beer Palace" three years later, before "Belgian Beer World" was settled on.

== Development ==
An architectural competition was held in 2015 for proposals to fully renovate and repurpose the building. The Brussels Bouwmeester and other jury members selected the joint proposal by the Ghent practice Robbrecht en Daem and the Brussels practice Baneton-Garrino. Under their scheme, the top two floors were given over to the beer museum, and the roof was converted into a 350-square-metre (3,800 sq ft) tasting area with 49 taps, sheltered by a gold-coloured canopy. The distinctive canopy was nicknamed "the waffle" for its resemblance to one.

Other elements of the plan that were carried out included a public pedestrian space at ground level, a restaurant, exhibition and meeting rooms, and the archaeological site Bruxella 1238. The Bourse remained the property of the City of Brussels, which set up the autonomous municipal company Bourse-Beurs to manage the building.

Construction ran from 2020 to 2023. The renovation cost €80 million, of which €11 million was budgeted for the museum conversion — €5 million from public bodies ranging from local to international level, and €6 million from Belgian breweries. Around a hundred breweries contributed to the project, and local artists helped design the interior. Belgian Beer World opened officially on 9 September 2023.

== Experience centre ==
The interactive beer trail is divided into six multimedia zones, each with its own theme. These cover the story of Belgian beer culture and the influence of Belgian beer abroad, and explain the brewing process in detail. Digital projections invite visitors to interact, while "multi-sensory workshops" let them experience the aromas and flavours found in beer. The "beer wall" is a wall of glass display cases holding 1,100 Belgian beers. At the end of the unguided route, visitors arrive at the rooftop Sky Bar, which is open to the public after the museum closes.

== See also ==
- List of museums in Brussels
- Culture of Belgium
