= Place de la Bourse, Brussels =

Square in Brussels, Belgium

Place de la Bourse (French); Beursplein (Dutch)
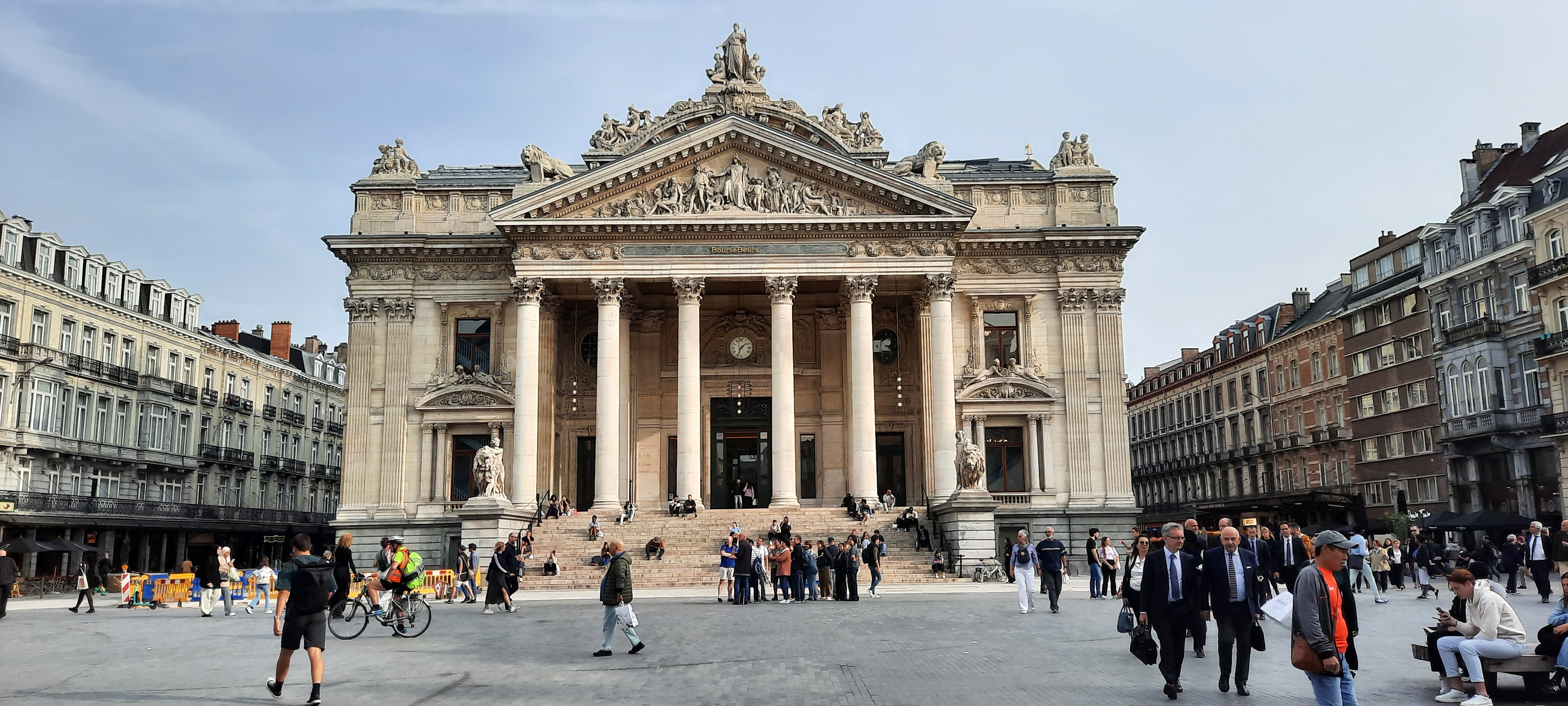
- The Bourse Palace on the Place de la Bourse/Beursplein

- Location within Brussels Location within Belgium
- Namesake: Bourse Palace
- Type: Square
- Location: City of Brussels, Brussels-Capital Region, Belgium
- Quarter: Central Quarter
- Postal code: 1000
- Coordinates: 50°50′54″N 04°20′59″E

Construction
- Completion: c. 1870

Other
- Designer: Léon Suys

The Place de la Bourse (French, pronounced [plas də la buʁs]) or Beursplein (Dutch, pronounced [ˈbøːrsˌplɛin]), meaning "Stock Exchange Square", is a major square in central Brussels, Belgium. It was created following the covering of the river Senne (1867–1871). Nowadays, it is, after the Grand-Place/Grote Markt, the second most important square in the city. The Bourse Palace, of which it takes its name, is located on this square. It is served by the premetro (underground tram) station Bourse - Grand-Place/Beurs - Grote Markt on lines 4 and 10.

== History ==
The Place de la Bourse was laid out following the covering of the river Senne (1867–1871), as part of the major urban works by the architect Léon Suys under the tenure of the then-mayor of the City of Brussels, Jules Anspach. Centrally located halfway down the Boulevard Anspach/Anspachlaan (then called the Boulevard Central/Centraallaan), it served as the focal point of Suys' sanitation and beautification programme for the city. The development work on the entire district began in 1868 and the Bourse Palace was inaugurated in 1873.

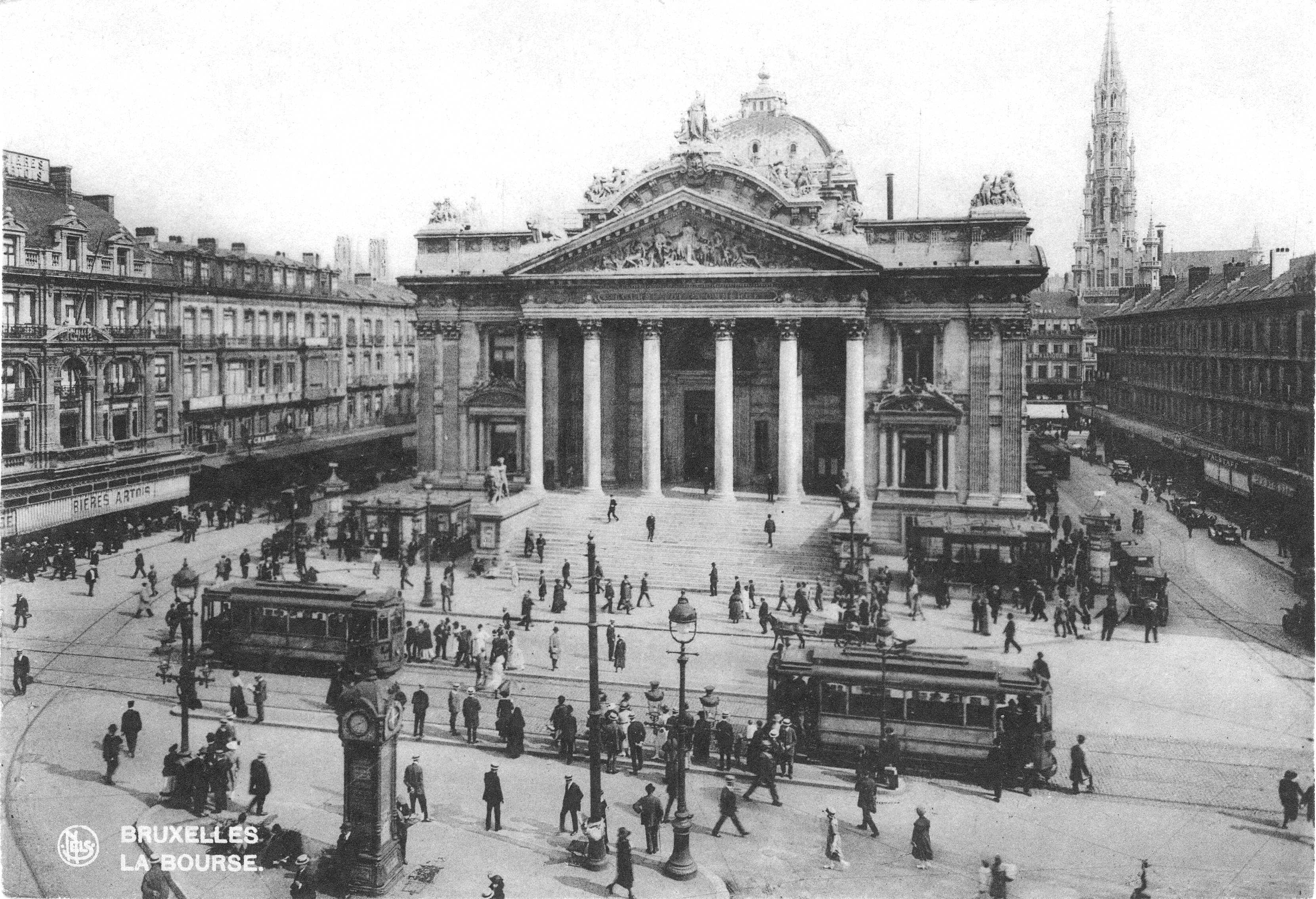
The Place de la Bourse/Beursplein in the 1920s

Nowadays, the square is used as a gathering place and many important events are organised there. Since 29 June 2015, it has been pedestrianised, as part of a large pedestrian zone in central Brussels (French: Le Piétonnier). On that occasion, it was partially restored to its original appearance and was repaved. In the aftermath of the 2016 Brussels bombings, it was used as an impromptu memorial. On 11 November 2017, a major riot broke out from the square.

== Buildings around the square ==
=== Bourse Palace ===
On the south-eastern side of the Place de la Bourse, the Bourse Palace occupies the site of the former Butter Market (French: Marché au Beurre, Dutch: Botermarkt), itself built over the remains of the 13th-century Recollets Franciscan convent. This eclectic building, also designed by Suys, was erected from 1868 to 1873, and mixes borrowings from the neo-Renaissance and Second Empire styles in a profusion of ornaments and sculptures by renowned artists including Auguste Rodin. After three years of renovations, the building reopened in 2023 as a museum of Belgian beer, with the main hall accessible to the public for the first time.

=== Other buildings ===
On the opposite side of the square, between the arteries forming angles with the Boulevard Anspach, stand two eclectic apartment buildings, built in a similar style in 1884–85, ensuring the homogeneity of the square. On the northern side, at the corner with the Rue Paul Devaux/Paul Devauxstraat, the square has been distorted since the replacement of the Grands Magasins de la Bourse, following their destruction by fire in 1948, with an imposing building of shops and offices. This building, designed according to the plans of the architect E. De Heu and dated 1949, with a corner tower topped with a dome, was partially modelled after the old one, by recovering elements of the original building, especially balconies.

== Location and accessibility ==
The Place de la Bourse lies at the conjunction of the Boulevard Anspach to the north and south with several smaller streets on its north-western side: the Rue Paul Devaux/Paul Devauxstraat, the Rue Auguste Orts/Auguste Ortsstraat, and the Rue Jules Van Praet/Jules Van Praetstraat. Additionally, two sides streets, running along each side of the stock exchange building, lead into it from the south-east: the Rue Henri Maus/Henri Mausstraat and the Rue de la Bourse/Beursstraat.

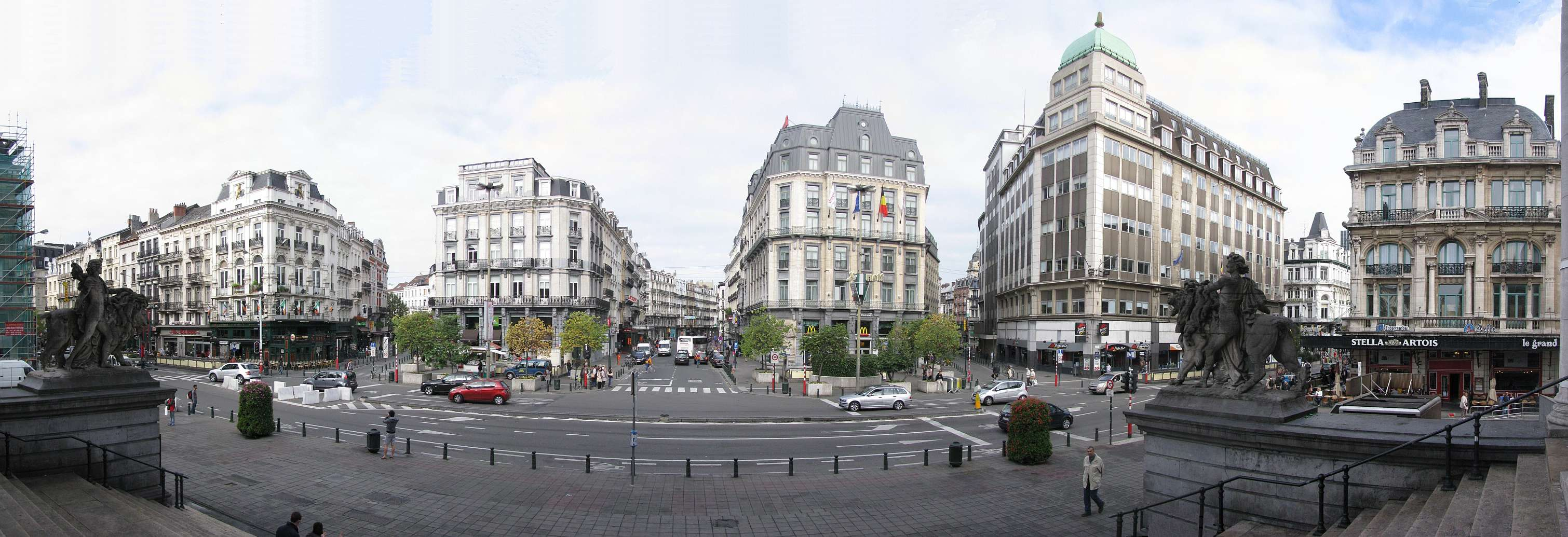
The Place de la Bourse in 2012, before pedestrianisation

== See also ==
- Neoclassical architecture in Belgium
- Art Deco in Brussels
- History of Brussels
- Belgium in the long nineteenth century
