= Bruxella 1238 =

Zrchaeological site in Brussels, Belgium

- Couvent des Frères Mineurs (French); Minderbroederklooster (Dutch)
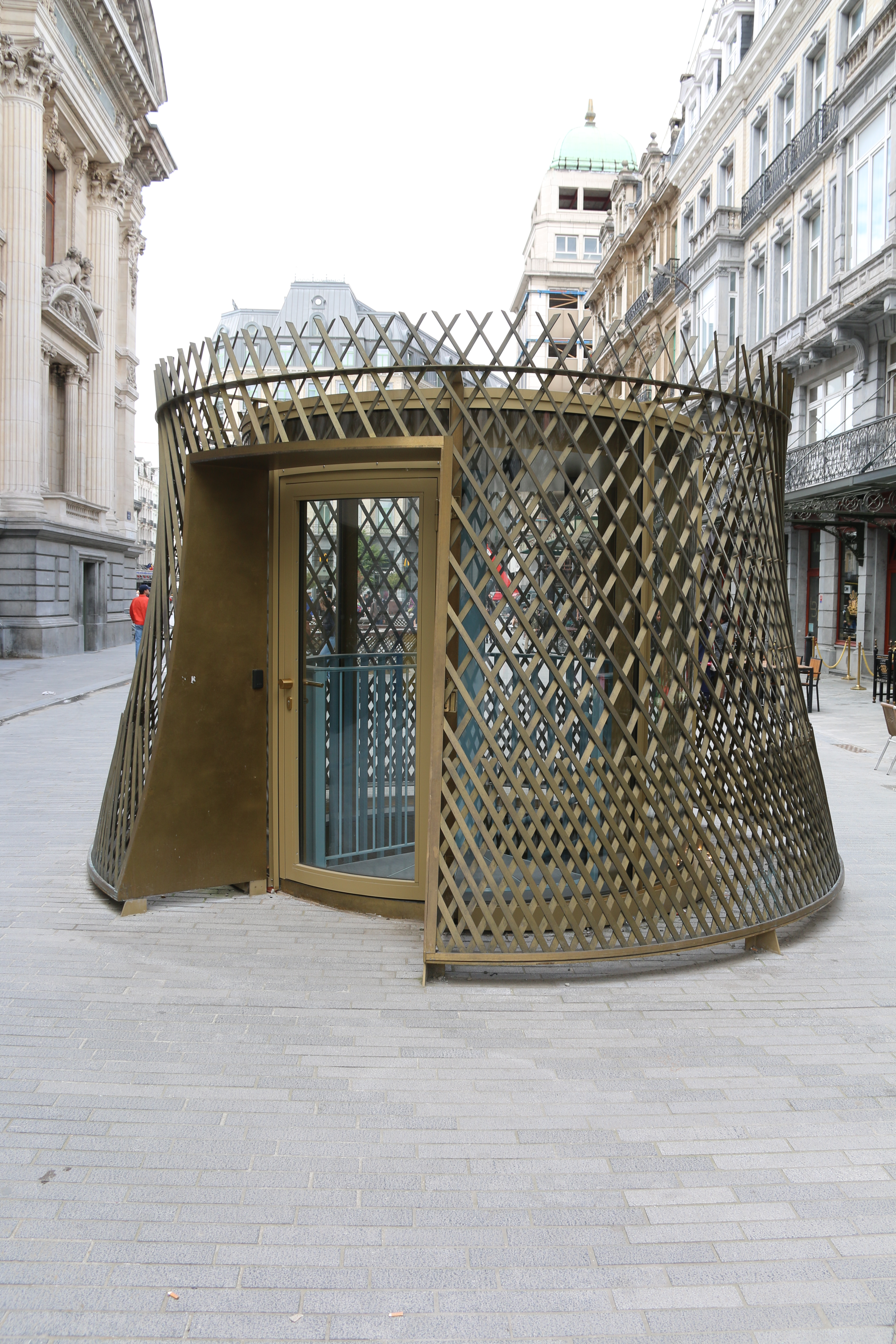
- Exit of Bruxella 1238
- Interactive map of Bruxella 1238
- 50°50′54″N 4°21′2″E
- Type: Convent
- Periods: Middle Ages–French period
- Associated with: Recollects
- Location: City of Brussels, Brussels-Capital Region, Belgium

History
- Abandoned: 15 May 1799
- Event: Bombardment of Brussels

Site notes
- Material: Stone
- Excavation dates: 1988
- Archaeologists: Pierre-Paul Bonenfant
- Discovered: 1988
- Condition: Ruined
- Owner: City of Brussels
- Public access: Yes
- Website: Official website

Bruxella 1238 is an archaeological site located beneath the Bourse Palace in Brussels, Belgium. The site presents the remains of a Recollect convent established in the early 13th century and offers visitors an insight into nearly a millennium of Brussels’ history. Excavations conducted between 1988 and 2022 uncovered building foundations, burial grounds, and various artefacts, which are now presented through an immersive scenography.

The convent endured significant events, including the European religious wars and the 1695 bombardment of Brussels by the troops of Louis XIV. Declared national property at the end of the 18th century, the convent was eventually demolished to make way for the construction of the Stock Exchange building. Among the preserved remains is the supposed tomb of Duke John I of Brabant, a figure later linked to the beer legend of Gambrinus.

== History ==
The Recollects, arrived in Brussels between 1227 and 1231. Around 1238 they established their first convent in the city and began building a church along the banks of the Senne, in the commercial Saint Nicholas district.

Outside the choir, successive walls of different periods were built, forming an archaeological and historical sequence spanning more than 500 years. The earliest were the 13th-century church walls, constructed of white stone and supported by buttresses. Monks were buried in simple graves aligned with the north–south axis of the church. In the 15th century, a building with buttressed walls was added along the choir, followed in the early 16th century by a partition wall founded on arches. Fragments of Gothic architecture were also recovered, including a sculpted canopy in black stone.

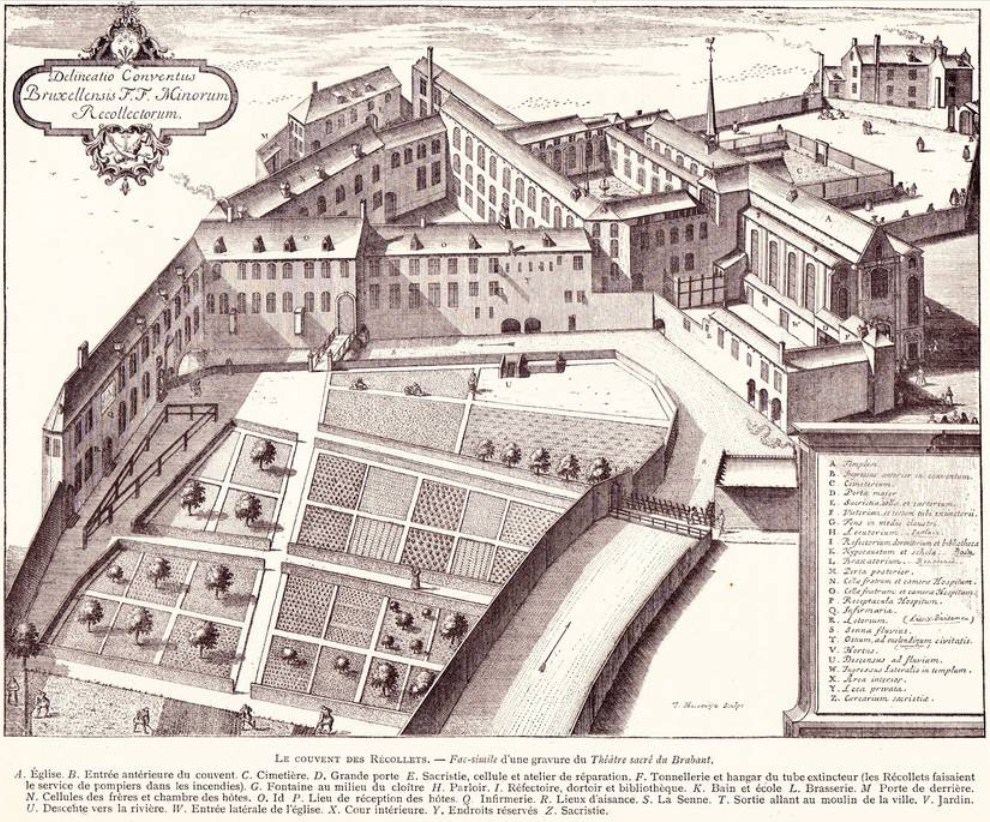
The 17th-century convent depicted by Jacobus Harrewijn.

In the 1560s, the wars of religion spread into the Low Countries. In 1579, the convent was looted by Protestant forces, the friars present were killed, and the convent was suppressed. In 1583, the church choir was demolished down to ground level, before being rebuilt after the Catholic reconquest of 1585. By 1588, reconstruction began under Archdukes Albert and Isabella, using thinner walls built with mixed and reused materials atop the original medieval foundations.

In 1695, Brussels was heavily bombarded by French artillery under the command of the Duke of Villeroy. The convent was badly damaged, and its archives were destroyed. The choir, however, survived relatively intact and the church was restored to use between 1697 and 1699 with the support of the Brussels administration and the Governor-General of the Spanish Netherlands, Maximilian II Emanuel of Bavaria. Surviving fragments of Baroque architecture from this post-medieval phase include stuccoed archivolt sections painted with imitation marble.

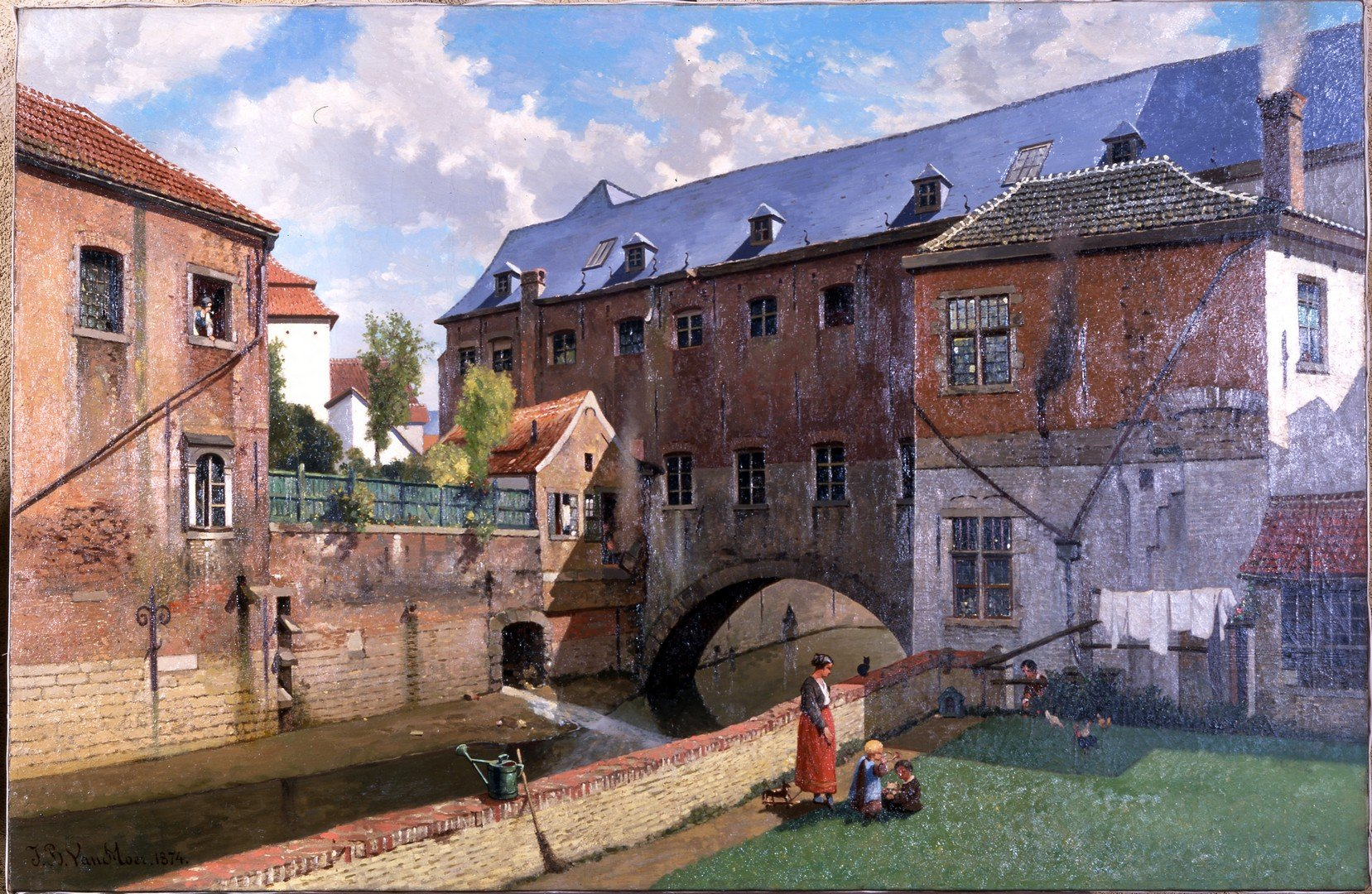
Former Recollets brewery along the Vaelbeek, 1874

Despite this revival, the community was expelled in 1796 under the French regime, when the convent became national property. The church was demolished on 15 May 1799, making way for the Marché au Beurre/Botermarkt. This modest market survived until 1871, when work began on the Bourse Palace, inaugurated in 1873.

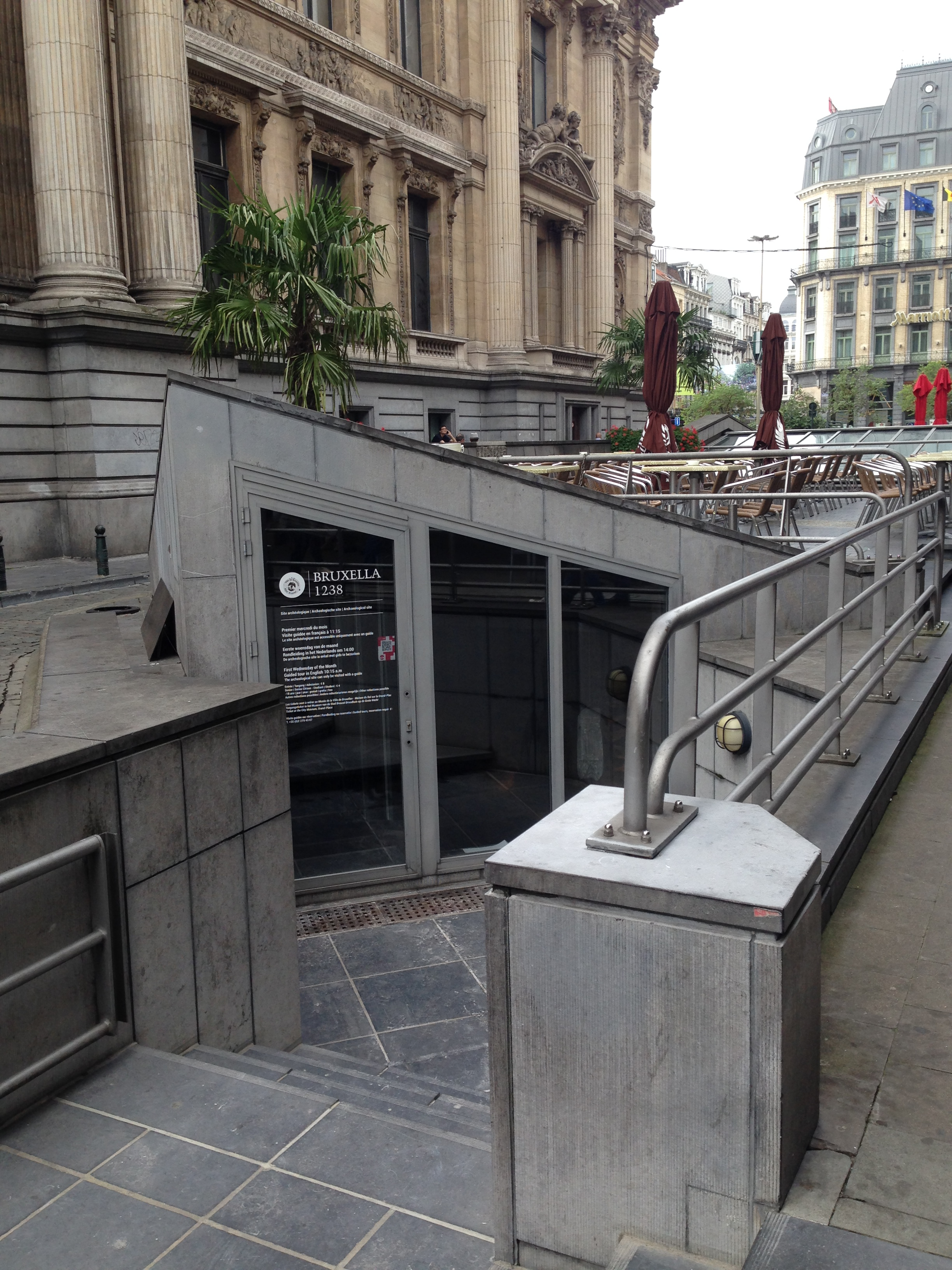
Former entrance of Bruxella 1238, removed during the museum’s remodeling.

In the summer of 1988, roadworks in Rue de la Bourse/Beursstraat led to archaeological excavations carried out by the Societe Royale d'Archeologie de Bruxelles in collaboration with the Excavation Department of the Université libre de Bruxelles. Under the direction of Pierre-Paul Bonenfant, the campaign uncovered significant remains of the Recollets convent, including parts of the church choir, cloister galleries, and burial vaults such as the supposed tomb of Duke John I of Brabant.

To preserve these discoveries, the City of Brussels decided to create an in situ museum. Designed by architect Jean-Paul Jourdain with engineering support from B Group, Bruxella 1238 was inaugurated on 27 May 1993. The design marked the medieval walls in the pavement above, while a glass roof allowed views of the excavated choir.

In 2020, ahead of the Stock Exchange’s transformation into Belgian Beer World, the Société Royale d’Archéologie de Bruxelles carried out a new preventive archaeological campaign on behalf of urban.brussels. These excavations confirmed that the site had been inhabited since at least the late 10th century and uncovered additional burials dating between the 13th and 18th centuries. A tunnel was also dug through the foundations of the Stock Exchange to link the archaeological site with the new complex.

The glass roof and concrete slabs of the 1993 museum were later dismantled, restoring Rue de la Bourse to its early 20th-century appearance. On 17 July 2024, the renovated Bruxella 1238 museum was officially inaugurated at the foot of the Bourse Palace and reopened to the public the following day. The redesign introduced a new entrance via the Stock Exchange building.

== See also ==
- List of museums in Brussels
- History of Brussels
