= Euro.nm =

Euro.nm is a pan-European network of regulated markets dedicated to growth companies. Formed on March 1, 1996 by the European Association of European Emerging Exchanges, members of this market network include Euronext Amsterdam, Euronext Paris, Euronext Brussels, Deutsche Börse AG, and Borsa Italiana. These growth markets share harmonious admission, trading and disclosure rules, access to all Euro.nm markets through cross-membership of financial intermediaries, a common infrastructure for the dissemination of market information, trading, and delivery, and joint marketing agreements to promote companies internationally. The Nasdaq Stock Market is the model for Euro.nm.
