= Boulevard Anspach =

Thoroughfare in Brussels, Belgium

Boulevard Anspach (French); Anspachlaan (Dutch)
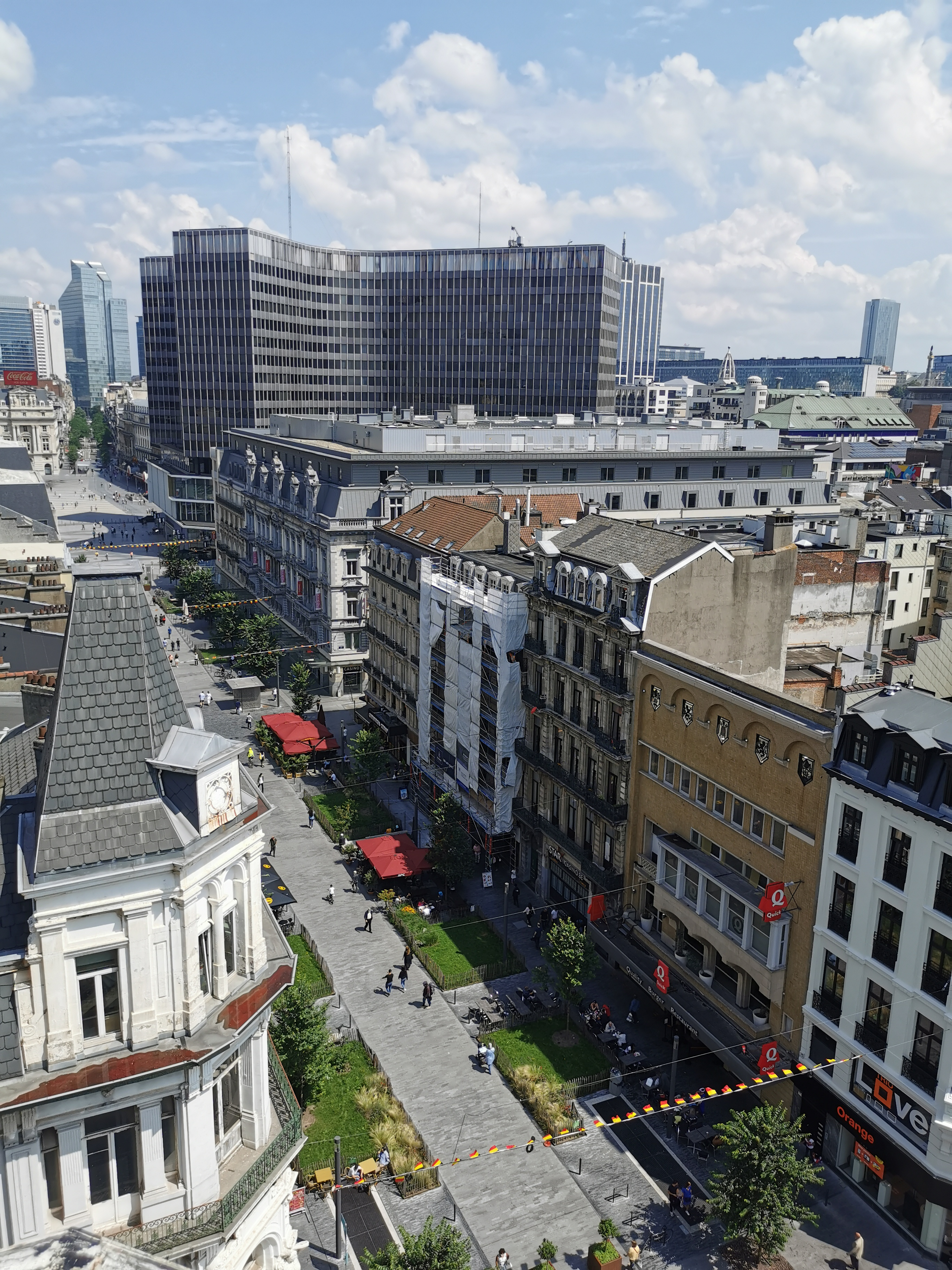
- View on the Boulevard Anspach/Anspachlaan from the former Actiris building

- Location within Brussels Location within Belgium
- Former names: Boulevard Central (French); Centraallaan (Dutch)
- Part of: Central Boulevards of Brussels
- Namesake: Jules Anspach
- Type: Boulevard
- Location: City of Brussels, Brussels-Capital Region, Belgium
- Quarter: Central Quarter
- Postal code: 1000
- Coordinates: 50°50′52″N 4°20′57″E

Construction
- Completed: 1868–1871

Other
- Designer: Léon Suys

The Boulevard Anspach (French) or Anspachlaan (Dutch) is a central boulevard in Brussels, Belgium, connecting the Place de Brouckère/De Brouckèreplein to the Place Fontainas/Fontainasplein. It was created following the covering of the river Senne (1867–1871), and bears the name of Jules Anspach, a former mayor of the City of Brussels.

The Boulevard Anspach is continued to the north by both the Boulevard Émile Jacqmain/Émile Jacqmainlaan and the Boulevard Adolphe Max/Adolphe Maxlaan, forming a "Y" crossroad at the Place de Brouckère. To the south, it crosses the Place de la Bourse/Beursplein about halfway through, and continues towards the Place Fontainas where it becomes the Boulevard Maurice Lemonnier/Maurice Lemonnierlaan.

Many places of interest lie along the Boulevard Anspach, for instance the Bourse Palace, the Ancienne Belgique concert hall, the Pathé Palace cinema (officially named the Cinéma Palace since 2018), as well as numerous shops and restaurants. De Brouckère metro station on lines 1 and 5 of the Brussels Metro is accessible from the Boulevard Anspach, as well as Bourse/Beurs premetro (underground tram) station.

== History ==
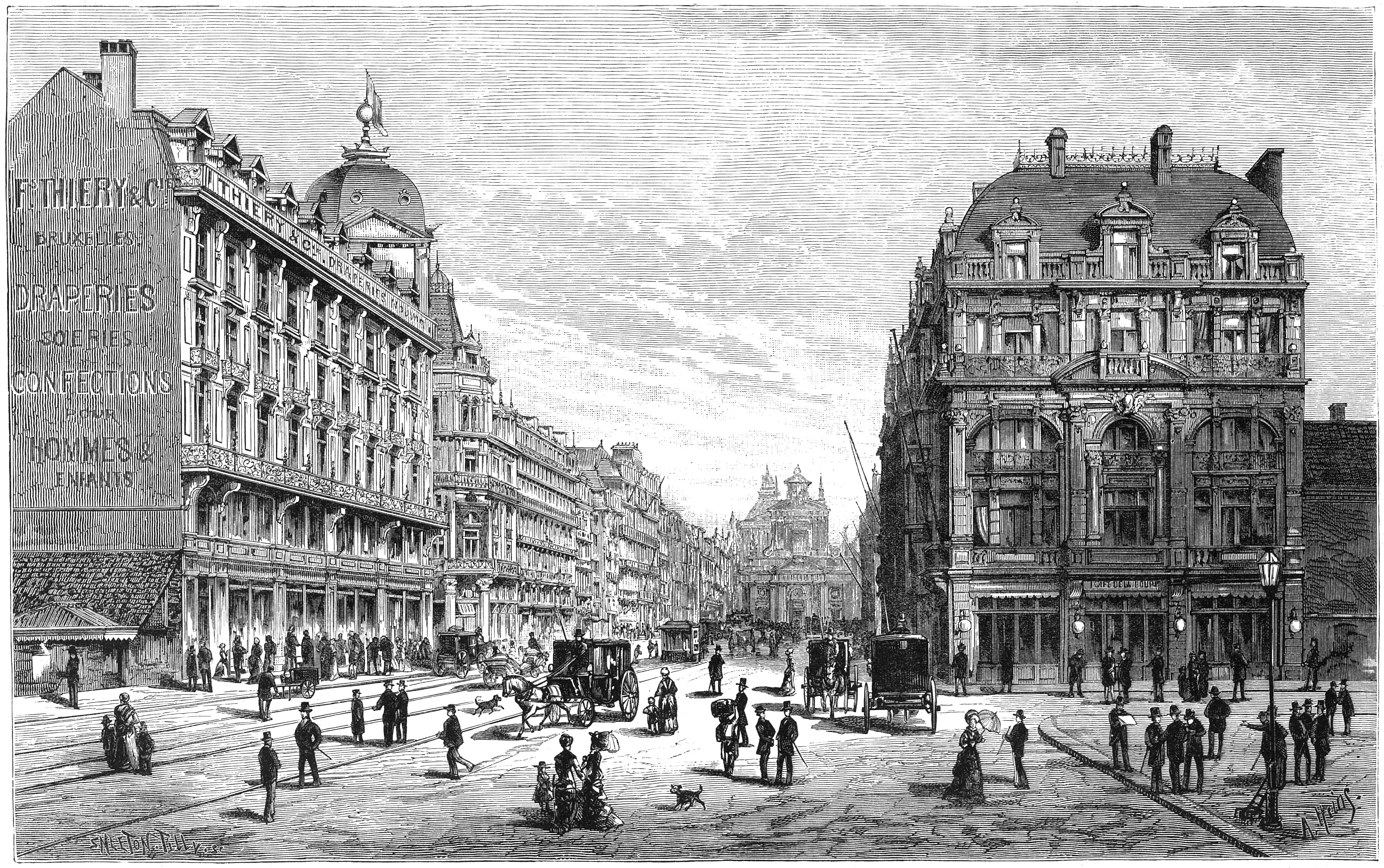
The Boulevard Anspach/Anspachlaan in 1880, etching by Armand Heins from L'Illustration nationale

The Boulevard Anspach was laid out between 1868 and 1871, as part of the Central Boulevards, which were created after the covering of the river Senne, although the river no longer flows underneath it. Prior to 1879, it was named the Boulevard Central/Centraallaan ("Central Boulevard"), when it was renamed in honour of Jules Anspach (1829–1879), the former mayor of the City of Brussels who instigated these works.

On 4 September 1944, the Boulevard Anspach was the scene of great jubilation during the liberation of Brussels by the British Guards Armoured Division. In 1976, as part of the North–South line, the premetro took the place of the river, which was then diverted along the Small Ring (Brussels' inner ring road).

In June 2012, "protest picnics" were held on the Boulevard Anspach to express dissatisfaction with the City of Brussels' mobility policy. Following these events, the city's then-mayor, Freddy Thielemans, decided to make the boulevard car-free every Sunday afternoon for the entire summer. His successor, Yvan Mayeur, wished to expand the Boulevard Anspach into a permanent pedestrian zone with a new street cover, equipped with fountains, works of art, benches and trees. On 29 June 2015, the boulevard finally became completely car-free between the Place de la Bourse/Beursplein and the Place de Brouckère/De Brouckèreplein, as part of a broader pedestrianisation of Brussels' city centre (French: Le Piétonnier).

== Notable buildings ==
The Boulevard Anspach is home to many buildings in neoclassical, Beaux-Arts, Art Nouveau, Art Deco and eclectic styles. Some examples include:

- No. 3: Café Sésino (1875), an eclectic building by Désiré De Keyser. It won the fifth prize in the architectural competition of 1876, and was demolished in 1967.
- No. 56–58: Modernist building (1939) by Adrien Blomme, originally built for Wielemans-Ceuppens breweries. It once housed the café Aux Armes des Brasseurs.
- No. 59–61: Eclectic apartment building (1872) by Gédéon Bordiau, decorated with caryatids by Julien Dillens
- No. 78: Café de la Bourse (1874), neo-Baroque building by Charles-Émile Janlet
- No. 85: Pathé Palace (1913), an Art Nouveau cinema by Paul Hamesse
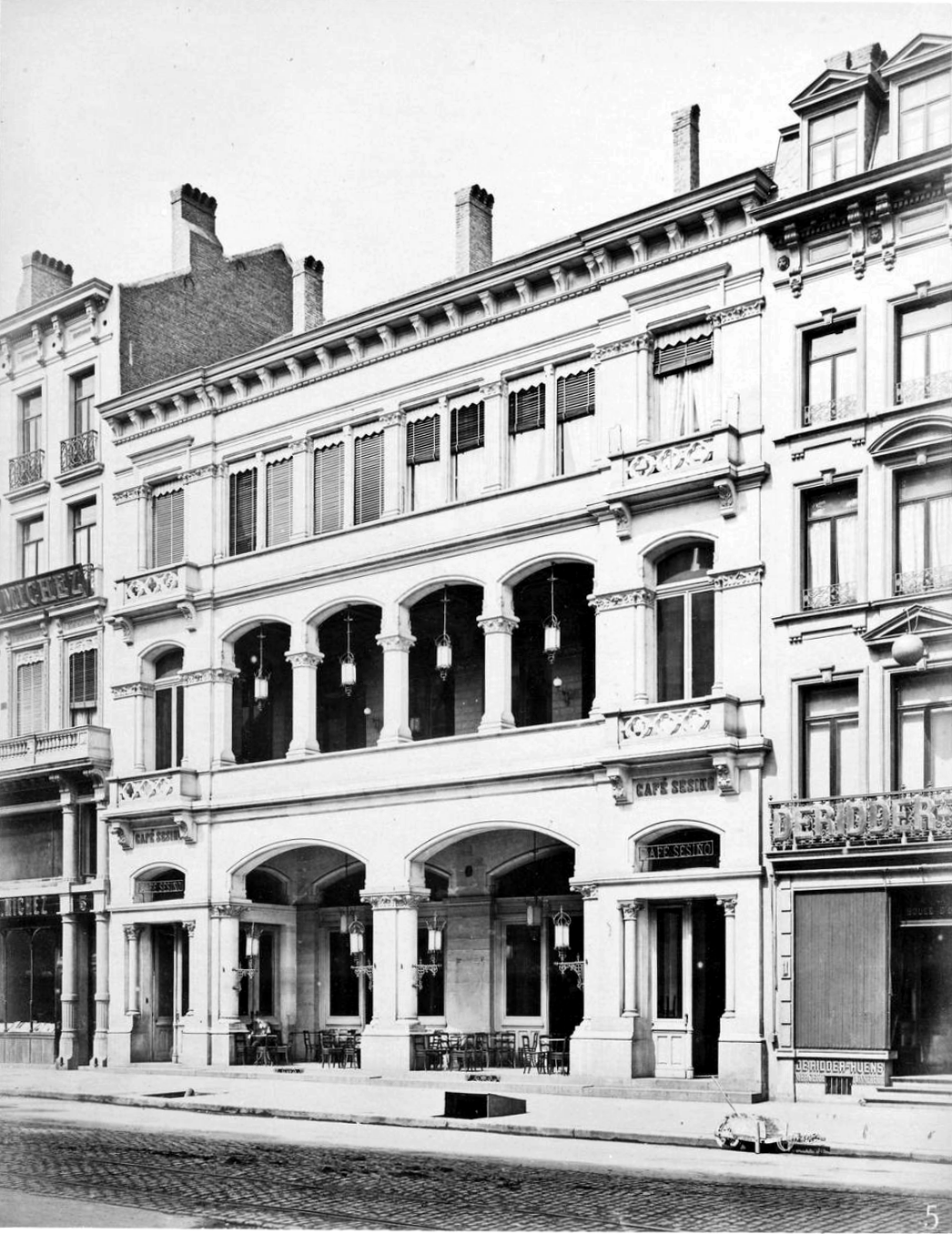
Café Sésino (De Keyser, 1875) (demolished)

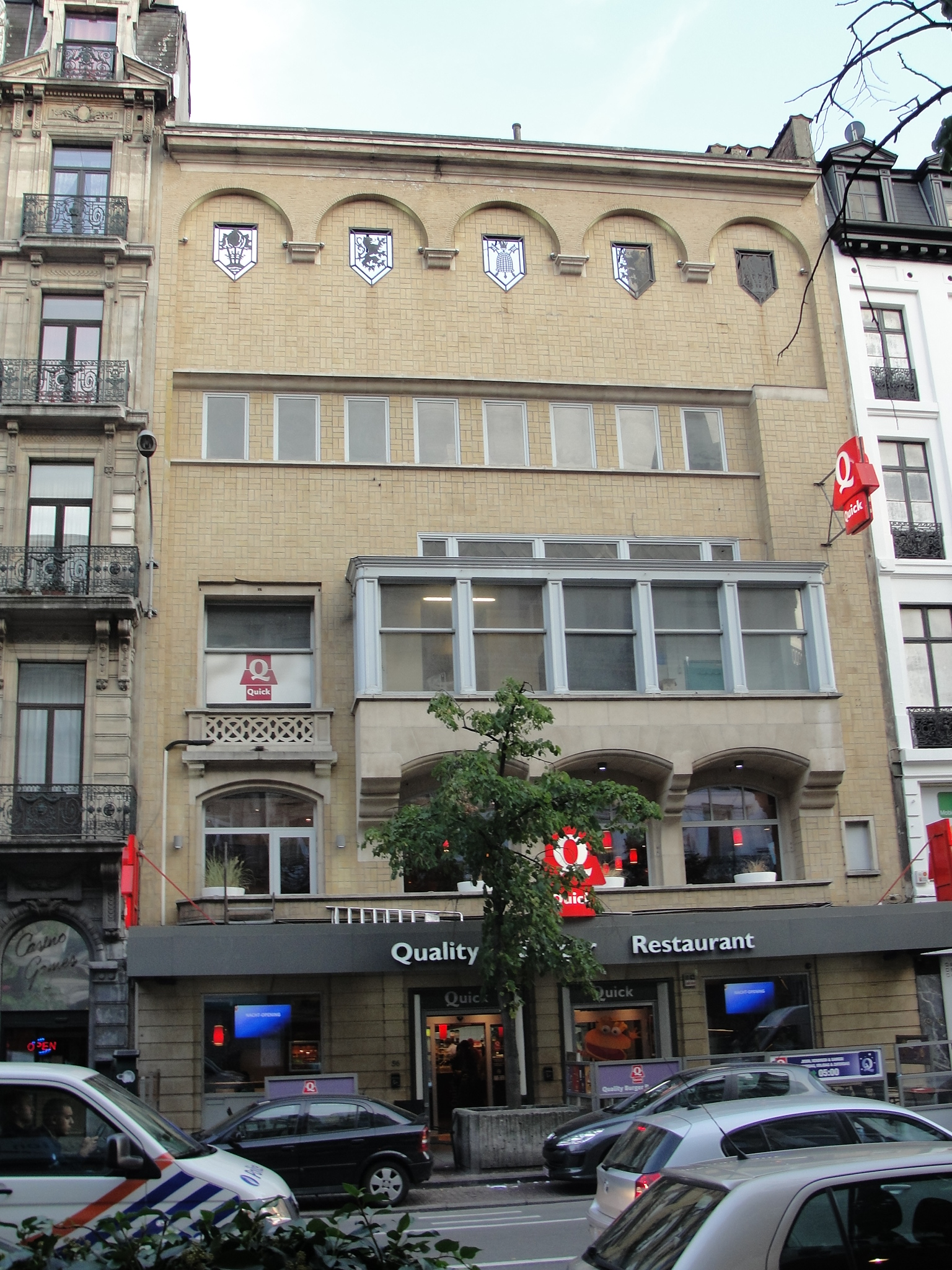
Aux Armes des Brasseurs (Blomme, 1939)

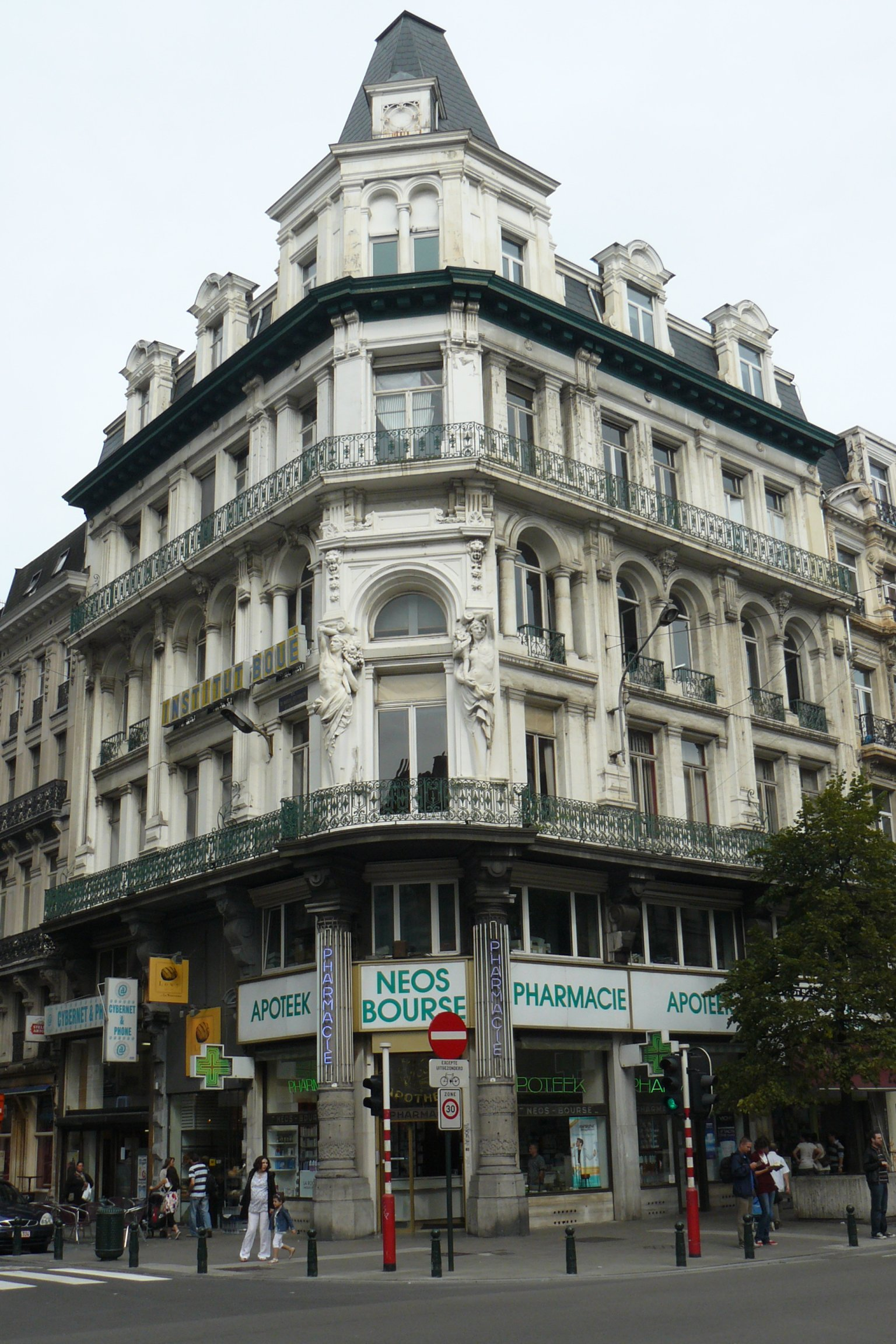
Apartment building (Bordiau and Dillens, 1872)

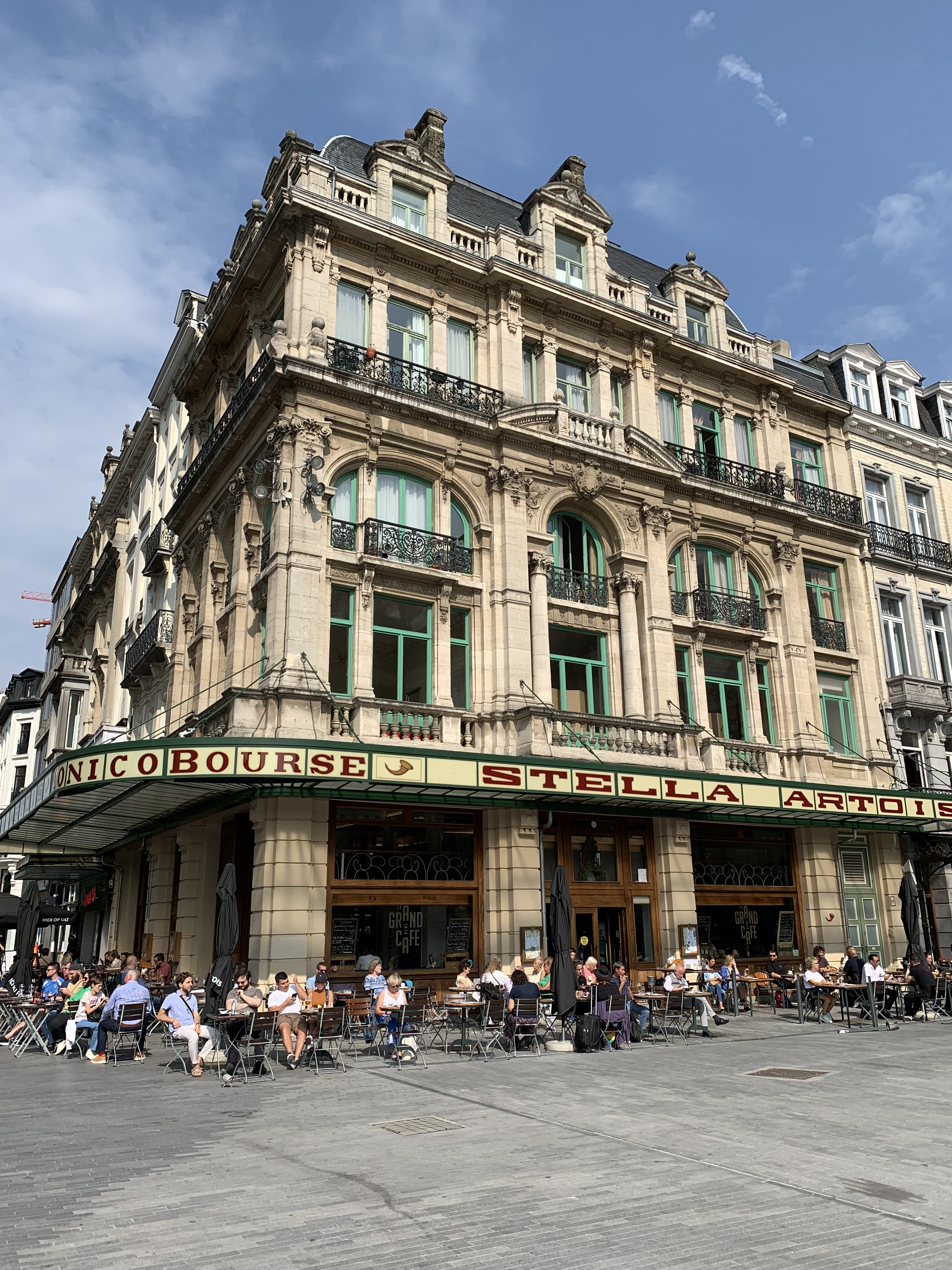
Café de la Bourse (Janlet, 1874)

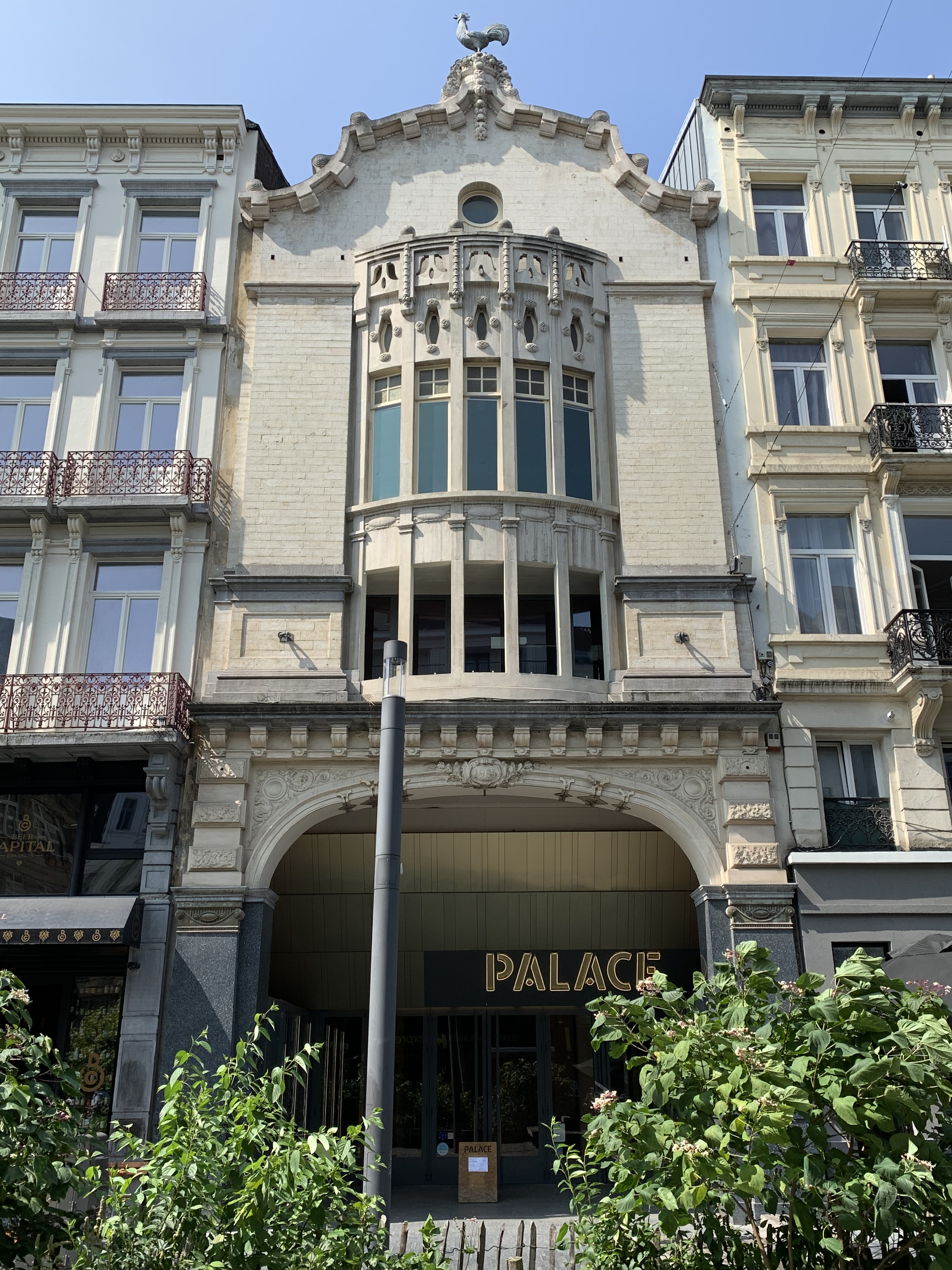
Pathé Palace cinema (Hamesse, 1913)

== See also ==
- List of streets in Brussels
- Neoclassical architecture in Belgium
- Art Nouveau in Brussels
- Art Deco in Brussels
- History of Brussels
- Belgium in the long nineteenth century
