= Bourse Palace =

Former stock exchange building in Brussels, Belgium

- Palais de la Bourse (French); Beurspaleis (Dutch)
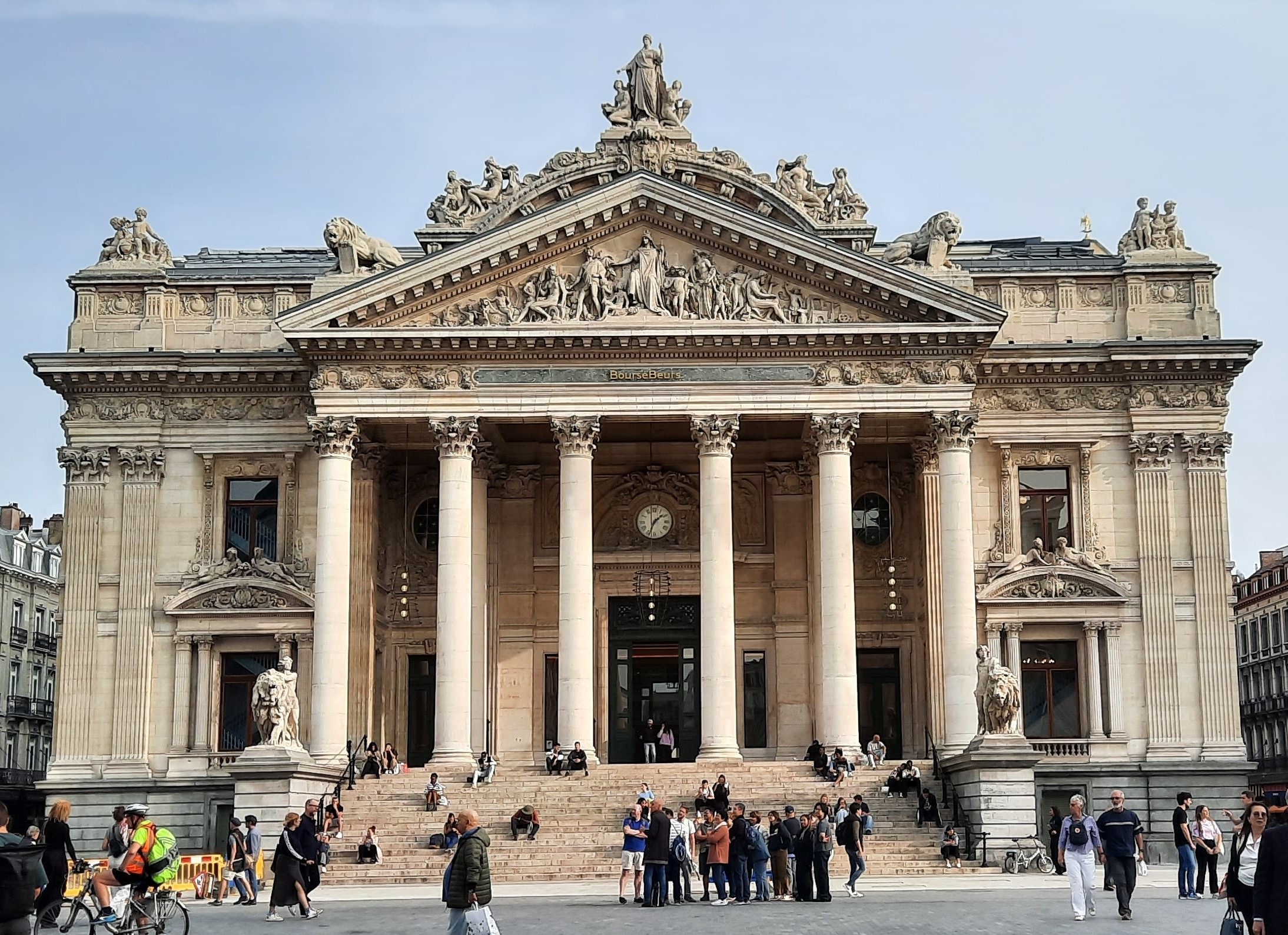
- Front view of the Bourse Palace seen from the Place de la Bourse/Beursplein
- Interactive map of the Bourse Palace area
- Alternative names: Brussels Stock Exchange building

General information
- Type: Stock exchange
- Architectural style: Eclectic; Renaissance Revival; Second Empire
- Location: Place de la Bourse / Beursplein, 1000 City of Brussels, Brussels-Capital Region, Belgium
- Coordinates: 50°50′53″N 4°21′01″E
- Construction started: 1868
- Completed: 1873
- Renovated: 2020–2023

Design and construction
- Architect: Léon-Pierre Suys
- Designations: Protected (19/11/1986)

Website
- www.boursebeurs.be/en

The Bourse Palace (French: Palais de la Bourse; Dutch: Beurspaleis), often simply called the Bourse (French: la Bourse; Dutch: de Beurs), is a former stock exchange building in Brussels, Belgium. It was previously the seat of the Brussels Stock Exchange (BSE). Since 2023, its upper floors have housed the Belgian Beer World museum.

Designed by the architect Léon-Pierre Suys, in an eclectic style mixing borrowings from neo-Renaissance and Second Empire architecture, the building was erected from 1868 to 1873 on the site of the former Butter Market, itself built over a former Franciscan convent whose remains have been unearthed. It is located on the Boulevard Anspach/Anspachlaan, and is the namesake of the Place de la Bourse/Beursplein.

== Naming ==
The former Brussels Stock Exchange (BSE) building is officially called the Palais de la Bourse in French or the Beurspaleis in Dutch (or simply la Bourse/de Beurs, respectively), meaning "Stock Exchange Palace". In English, the building does not have a distinct name, though it is usually called the Bourse Palace, or simply the Bourse.

== History ==
=== Inception and construction ===
Created in 1801 by decree of Napoleon, the Brussels Stock Exchange (French: Bourse de Commerce de Bruxelles) successively occupied different premises. From 1858, a time when it experienced considerable development following the country's economic and industrial growth, the cramped and unsanitary conditions of the various premises led the business community to demand, from the municipal authorities, the erection of a new stock exchange.

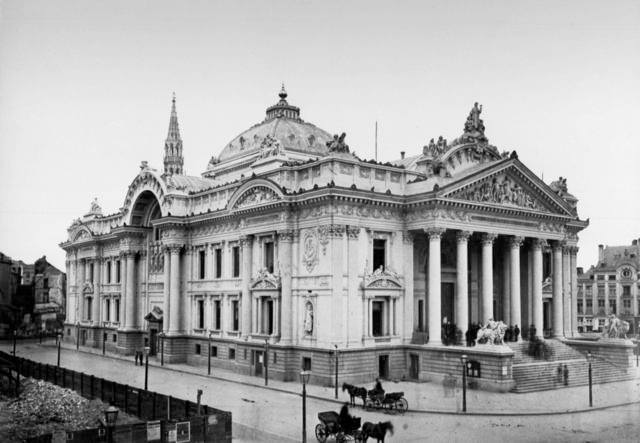
The Bourse Palace in 1873, shortly after completion

Following the covering of the river Senne for health and aesthetic reasons between 1867 and 1871, a massive programme of beautification of Brussels' city centre was undertaken. Having become a priority in the list of works of public utility, this undertaking gave rise, at the time, to numerous proposals including that of the architect Léon-Pierre Suys which, as part of his proposal to construct a series of grand boulevards in the river's place, designed a stock exchange building to become the centre of the rapidly expanding business sector. Supported by several petitions, Suys' proposal won the support of the municipal council.

The Bourse Palace was erected from 1868 to 1873, halfway down the newly created Boulevard Anspach/Anspachlaan (then called the Boulevard Central/Centraallaan), on the site of the former Butter Market (French: Marché au Beurre, Dutch: Botermarkt), itself built over the remains of the 13th-century Recollets Franciscan convent. The building was inaugurated with a large ball in the presence of King Leopold II, his wife Queen Marie Henriette, and his brother Prince Philippe, Count of Flanders. In parallel to these works, a large square, called the Place de la Bourse/Beursplein, was created in front of the building.

=== Renovations and fire ===
Over the years, the Bourse Palace underwent many renovations. Between 1930 and 1950, it was decided to increase the usable area and the incidence of light. On that occasion, a third floor was added and the central side walls on the Rue Henri Maus/Henri Mausstraat and the Rue de la Bourse/Beursstraat were opened up. The load-bearing parts of the building were also reinforced with reinforced concrete to support these renovations.

On the night of 29 November 1990, a fire broke out in one of the stockbrokers' cabins on the ground floor of the building, causing a lot of damage. As a result, the BSE risked losing its financial activities and its reason for existence. Though the building was neatly restored, automation and acquisitions were already bringing an end to old market practices. In July 1996, all market floor activities disappeared. That year, the cash market was fully digitalised and the daily meeting of stockbrokers and traders therefore became redundant.

=== BSE relocation and current usage ===
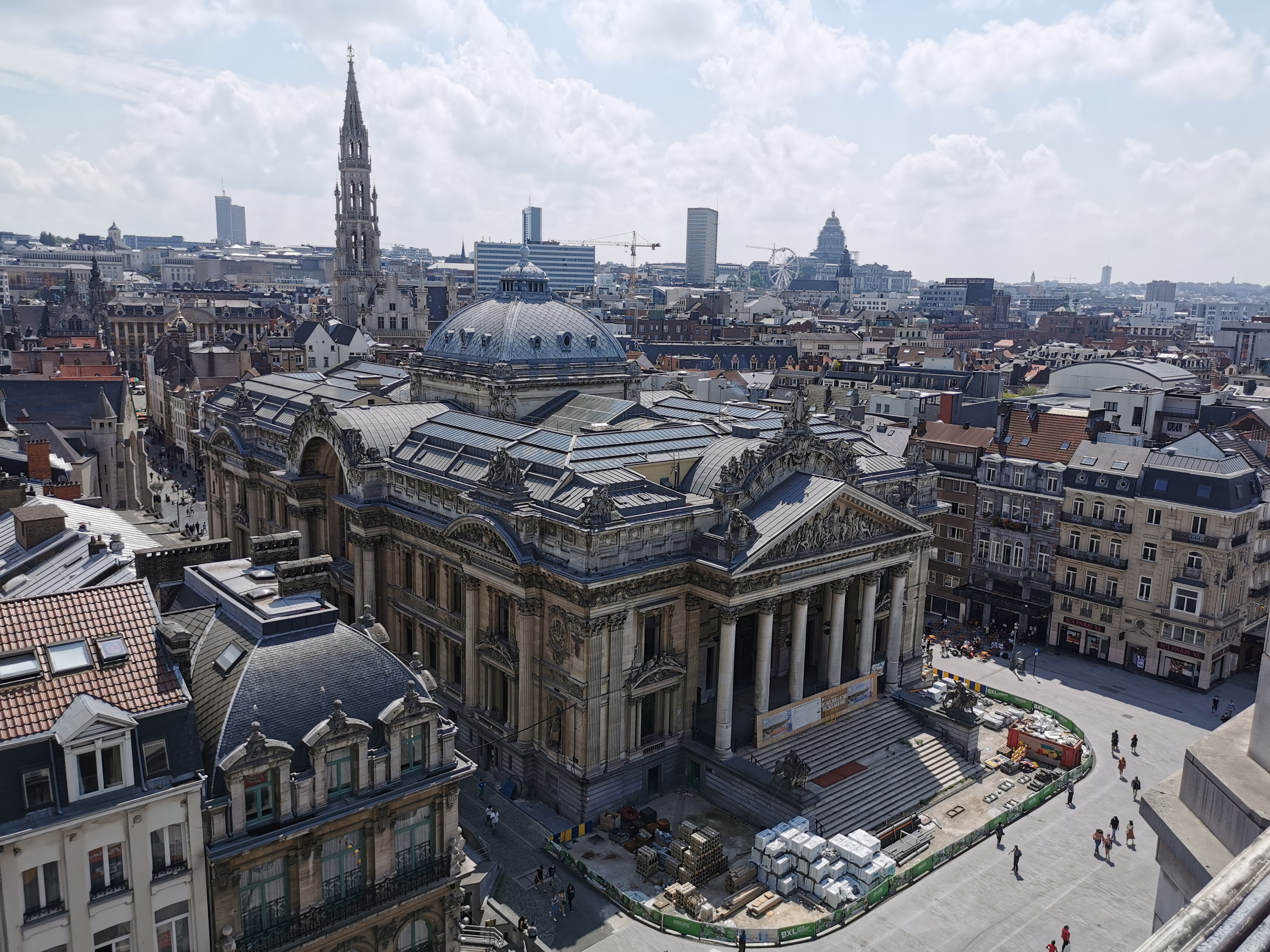
View of the building from above during renovation

In 2000, the BSE merged with the Amsterdam, Lisbon and Paris stock exchanges into Euronext, renaming the BSE Euronext Brussels. In 2015, this company moved away from the Bourse Palace, which had become too large, after the lease was broken by the City of Brussels in 2012.

The vacated space was then occasionally opened to house temporary exhibitions of the City of Brussels. In the meantime, a competition was held about repurposing the Stock Exchange building. Renovations started in 2020 and plans were made to reopen the building as a museum of Belgian beer. The winning design by Robbrecht & Daem, Baneton-Garrino and Popoff provided new space in the top two floors for the museum. The roof was converted into a panoramic bar with terrace, covered by a brass awning. After three years of renovations, the Belgian Beer World museum was opened in September 2023, with the main hall accessible to the public for the first time.

== Description ==
=== Exterior ===
The eclectic building, inspired by Palladian architecture, mixes borrowings from the neo-Renaissance and Second Empire styles. It has an abundance of ornaments and sculptures, created by famous artists, including the brothers Jacques and Jean-Joseph Jacquet, the French sculptor Albert-Ernest Carrier-Belleuse and his then-assistant Auguste Rodin. Some of the best examples are the group of four allegorical figures on the façade by Guillaume de Groot, symbolising Art, Agriculture, Industry and Science, as well as the friezes by Carrier-Belleuse, to which Rodin may have contributed.

Towards the boulevard, the two allegorical lion sculptures by Jacquet on each side of the main entrance's monumental staircase (one with its head facing up, the other curved back) represent the two symbolic stock market trends (akin to the famous "bull and bear" metaphor), as well as the Belgian Nation. They are accompanied by a genius with a torch by the same sculptor.

A large arched skylight was pierced through the centre of the side façades by the architect Jules Brunfaut in 1893 in order to bring more light into the interior.

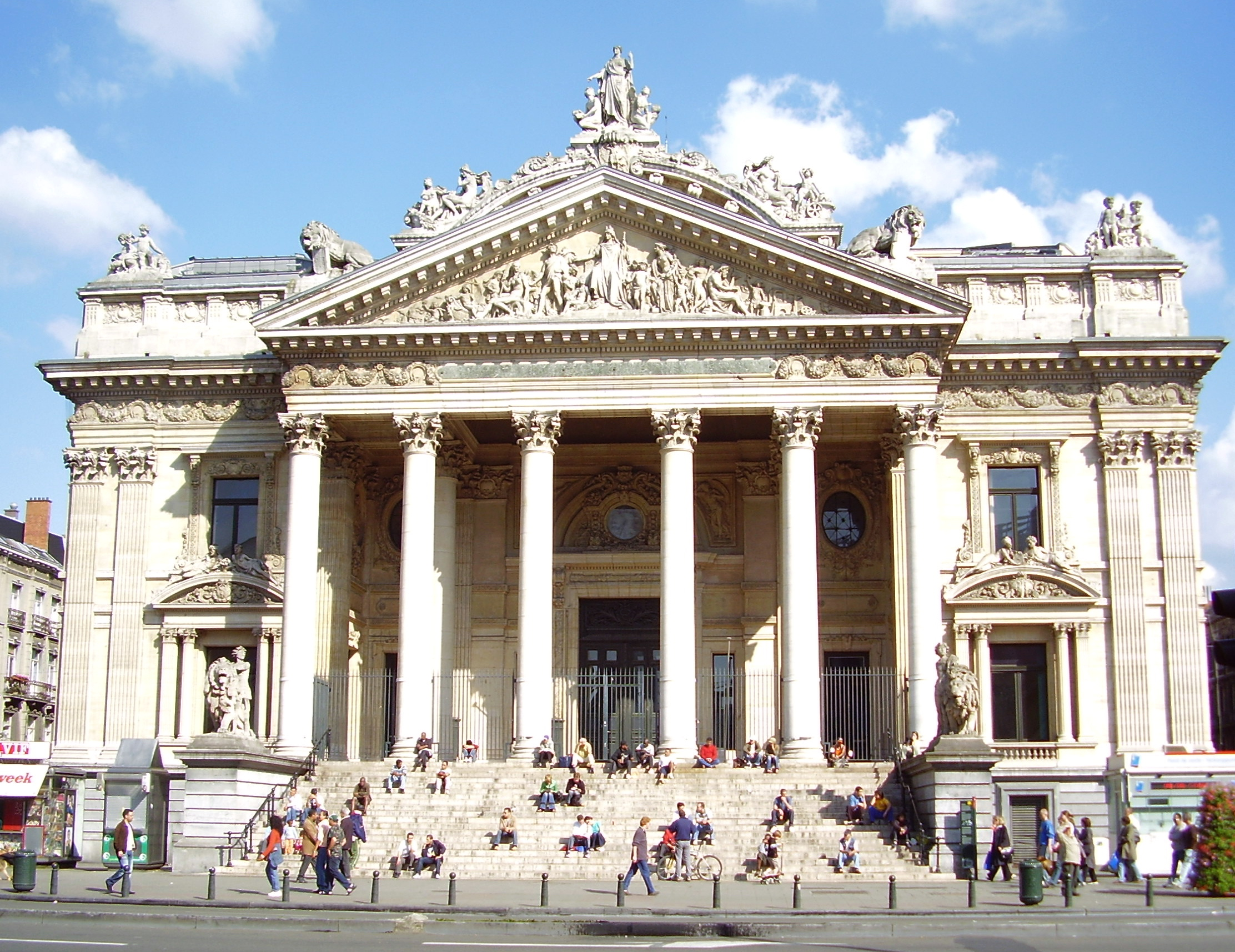
Main façade and portico

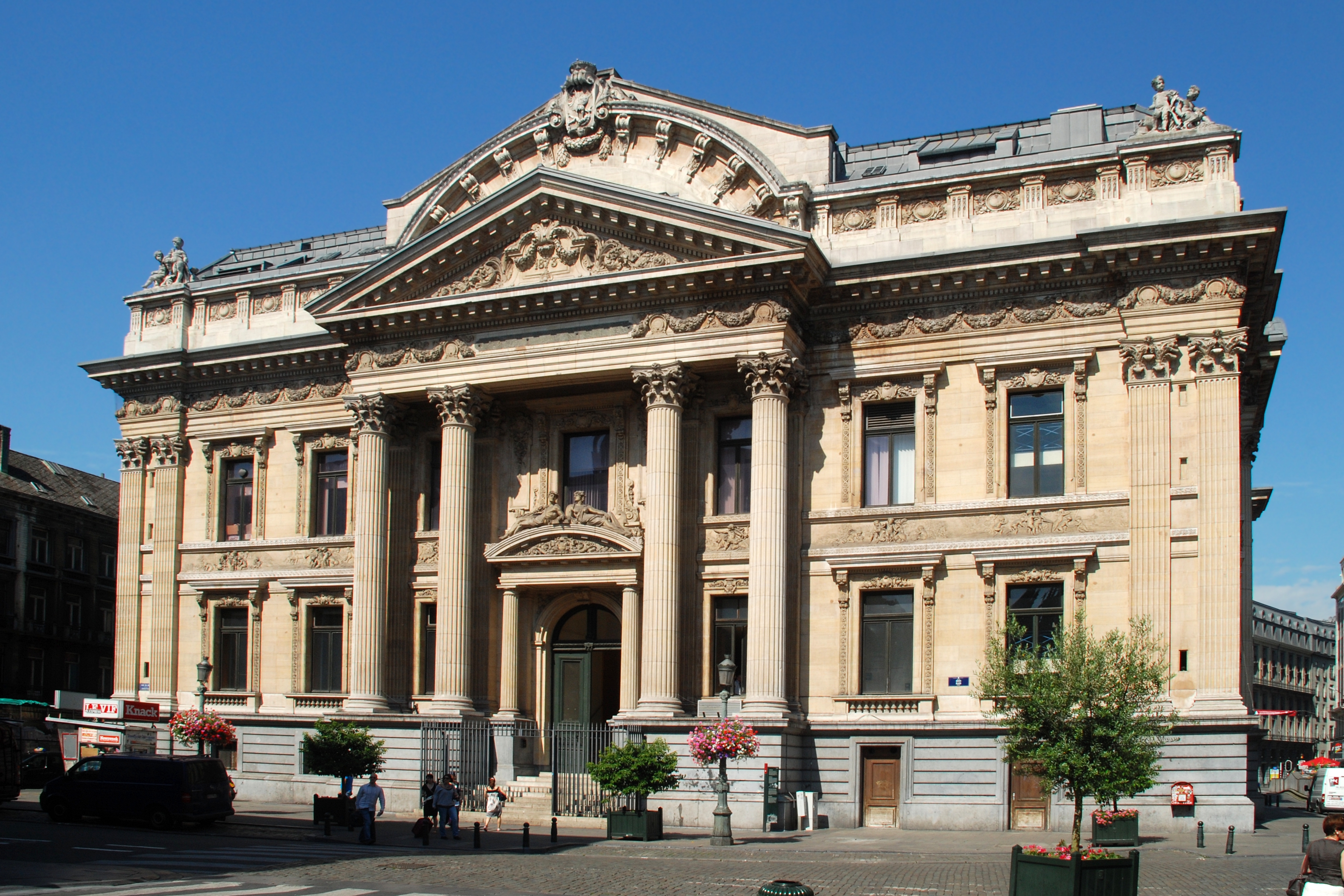
Rear façade on the Rue du Midi/Zuidstraat

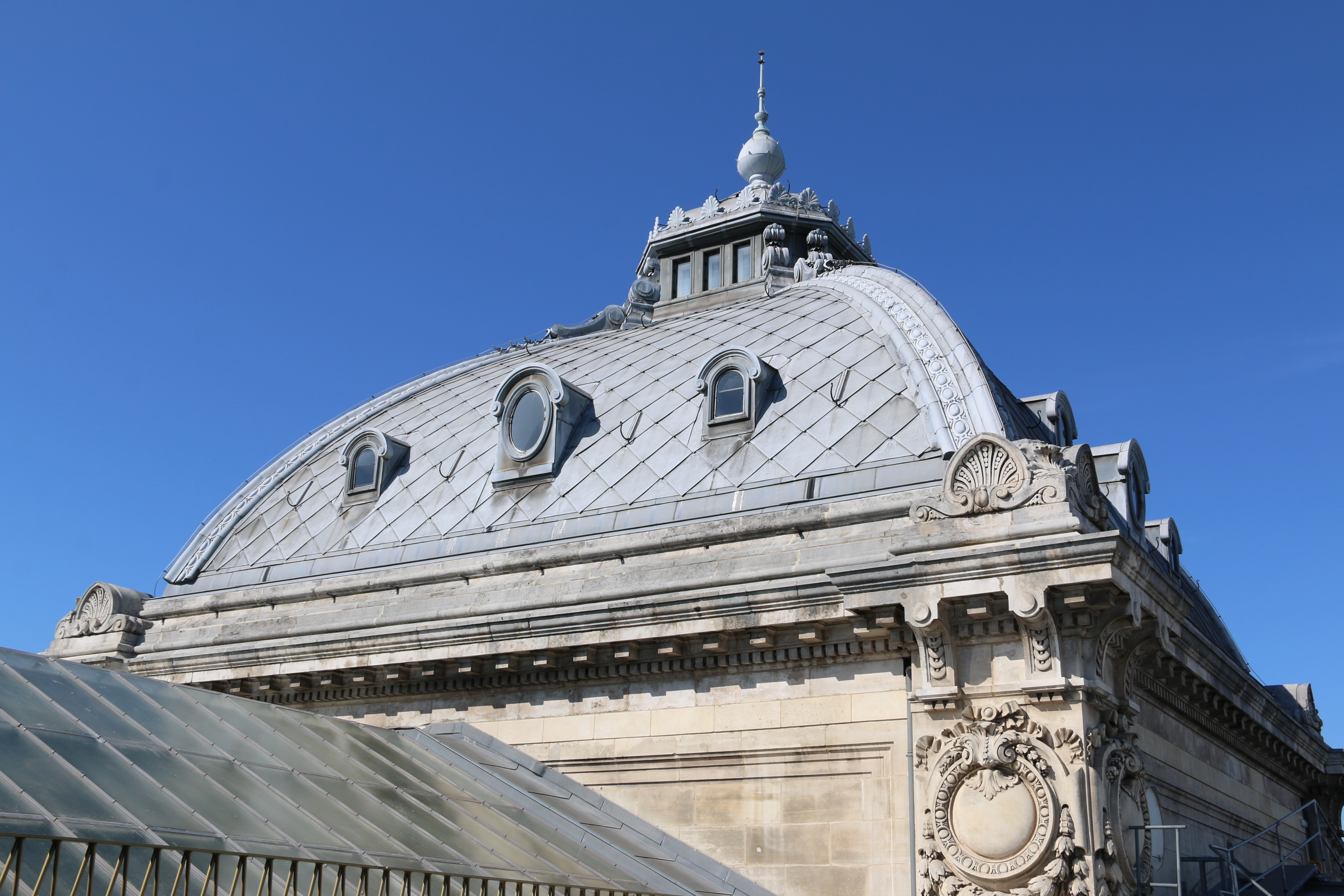
Closeup of the cupola

=== Interior ===
The interior, also inspired by Palladian plans, is a cruciform vessel supported by four monumental piers against which are attached Corinthian columns. In the centre of the building, the main hall or salle des pas perdus (lit. 'hall of lost steps'), around which rooms and vestibules are arranged, is topped by a dome with a finial rooflight.

The inside pediment separating the main hall from the entrance vestibule on the Rue du Midi/Zuidstraat includes four caryatids by Rodin and Antoine van Rasbourg, symbolising Protection, Trade, Art and Victory, with above them a globe carried by two putti. The original light fixture supports were supplied at the time by the Compagnie des Bronzes de Bruxelles.

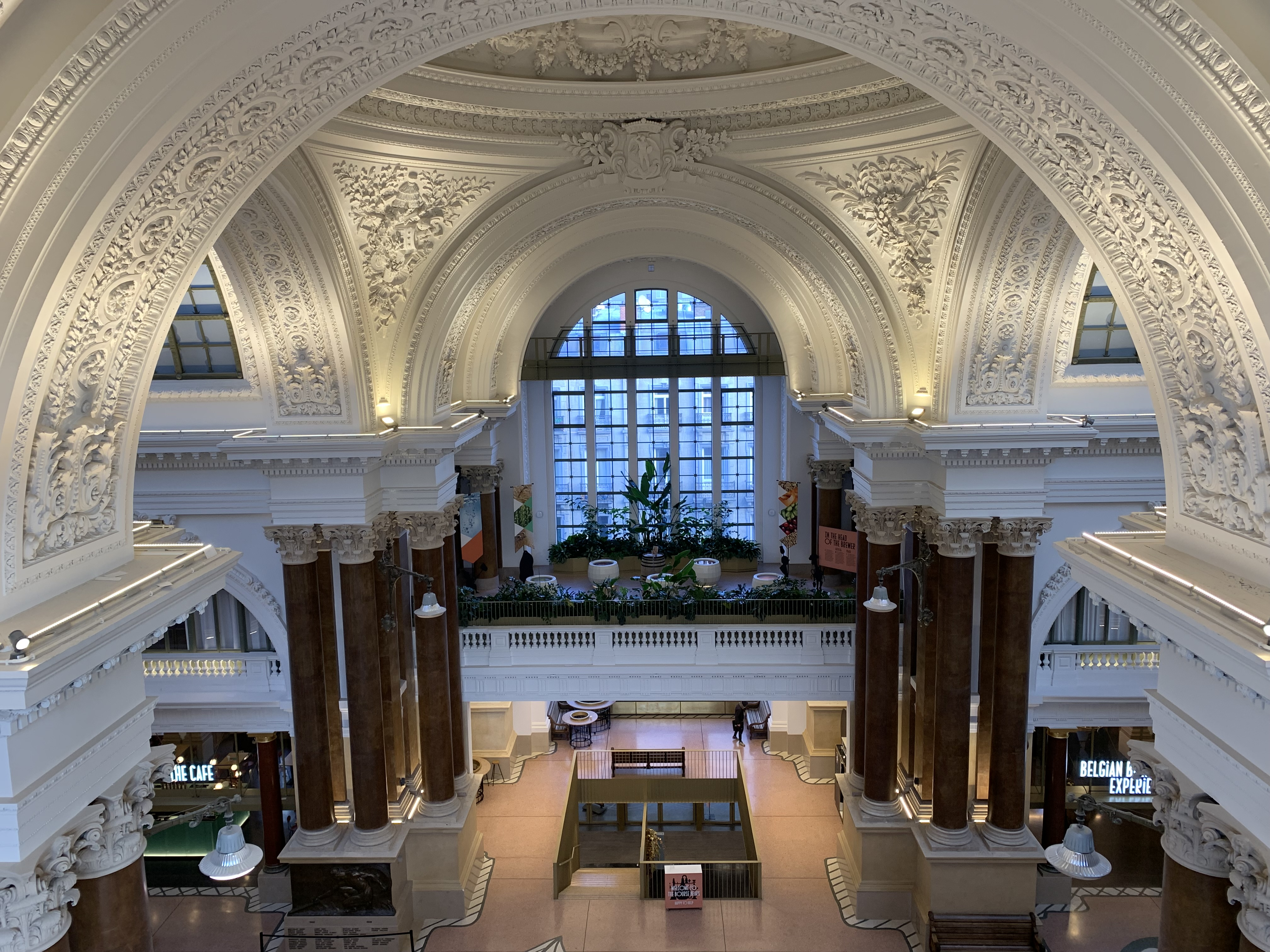
Interior view of the main entry hall or salle des pas perdus

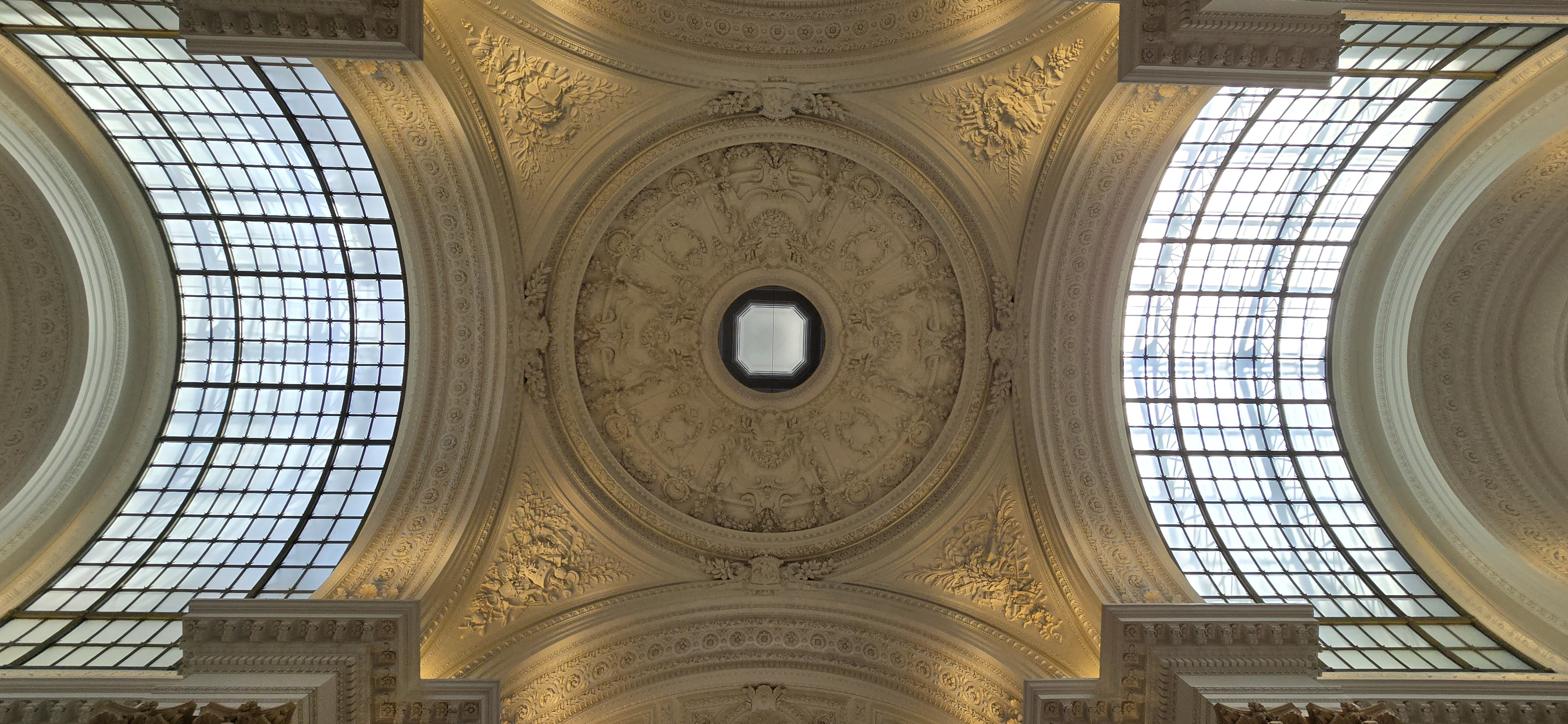
At the centre of the building looking upwards towards the dome

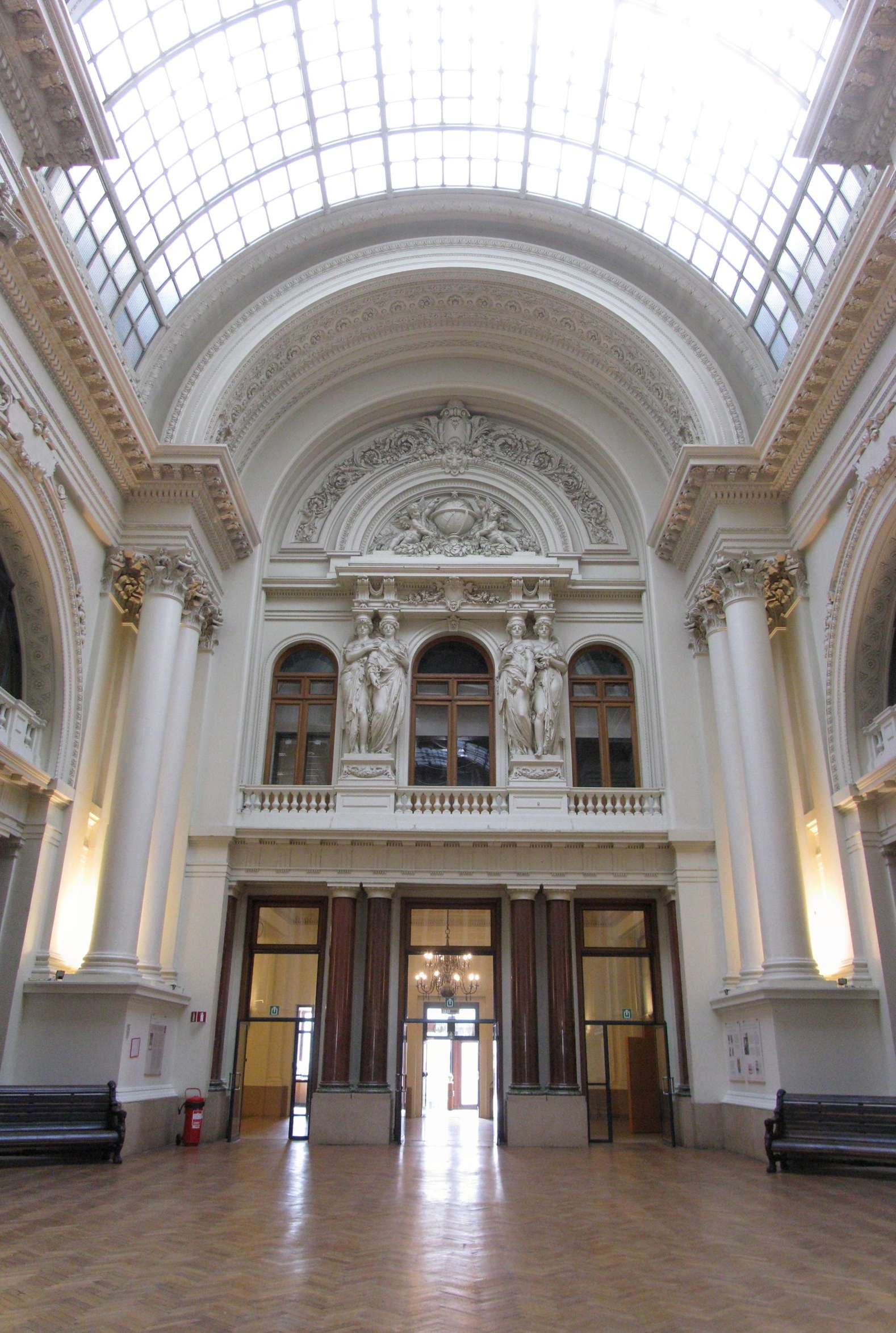
Interior pediment with caryatids by Auguste Rodin and Antoine van Rasbourg

== See also ==
- History of Brussels
- Belgium in the long nineteenth century
