= Second Empire architecture in Europe =

Architectural style

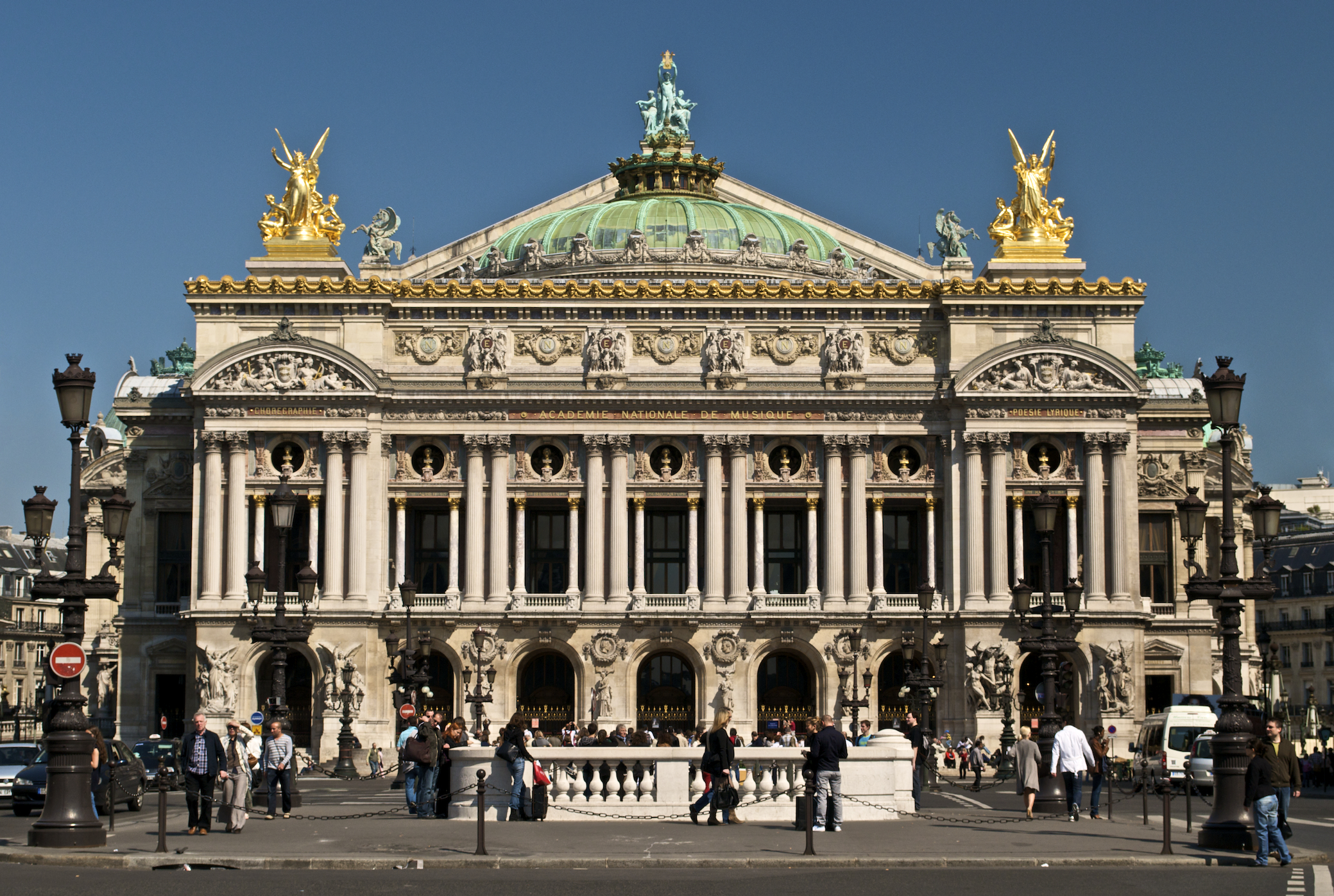
The Palais Garnier, a Second Empire architectural mix of Neo-Renaissance and Neo-Baroque styles

Second Empire architecture is an architectural style rooted in the 16th-century Renaissance, which grew to its greatest popularity in Europe in the second half of the nineteenth century and early years of the twentieth century. As the style evolved from its origins, it acquired a mix of European styles, most notably the Baroque, often combined with mansard roofs and low, square based domes. It derived its name from the Second French Empire of Napoleon III.

== Development ==
The Second Empire style quickly spread throughout Europe and evolved as a loose form of Baroque Revival architecture, where its suitability for super-scaling allowed it to be widely used in the design of municipal and corporate buildings

The style is particularly prominent in Paris and Vienna, both of which were heavily redeveloped in the late 19th century. Rome also saw a huge expansion after the Risorgimento, where the Bank of Italy designed by Gaetano Koch is a notable example.

Second Empire became popular in Britain at the end of the nineteenth century, where it emerged as a fusion of the architecture of the classical Renaissance exemplified by Christopher Wren and the solid mass Baroque of John Vanbrugh, decorated with some of the more ornate Baroque motifs previously found only on mainland Europe. It often featured a low dome, a once complex architectural feat rendered less difficult through the use of iron and reinforced concrete.

In London, the style is exemplified by Methodist Central Hall, Westminster, designed by Edwin Alfred Rickards of the firm Lanchester, Stewart and Rickards. It is an early example of the use of a reinforced concrete frame for a building in Britain. The interior was similarly planned on a Piranesian scale, although the execution was rather more economical.

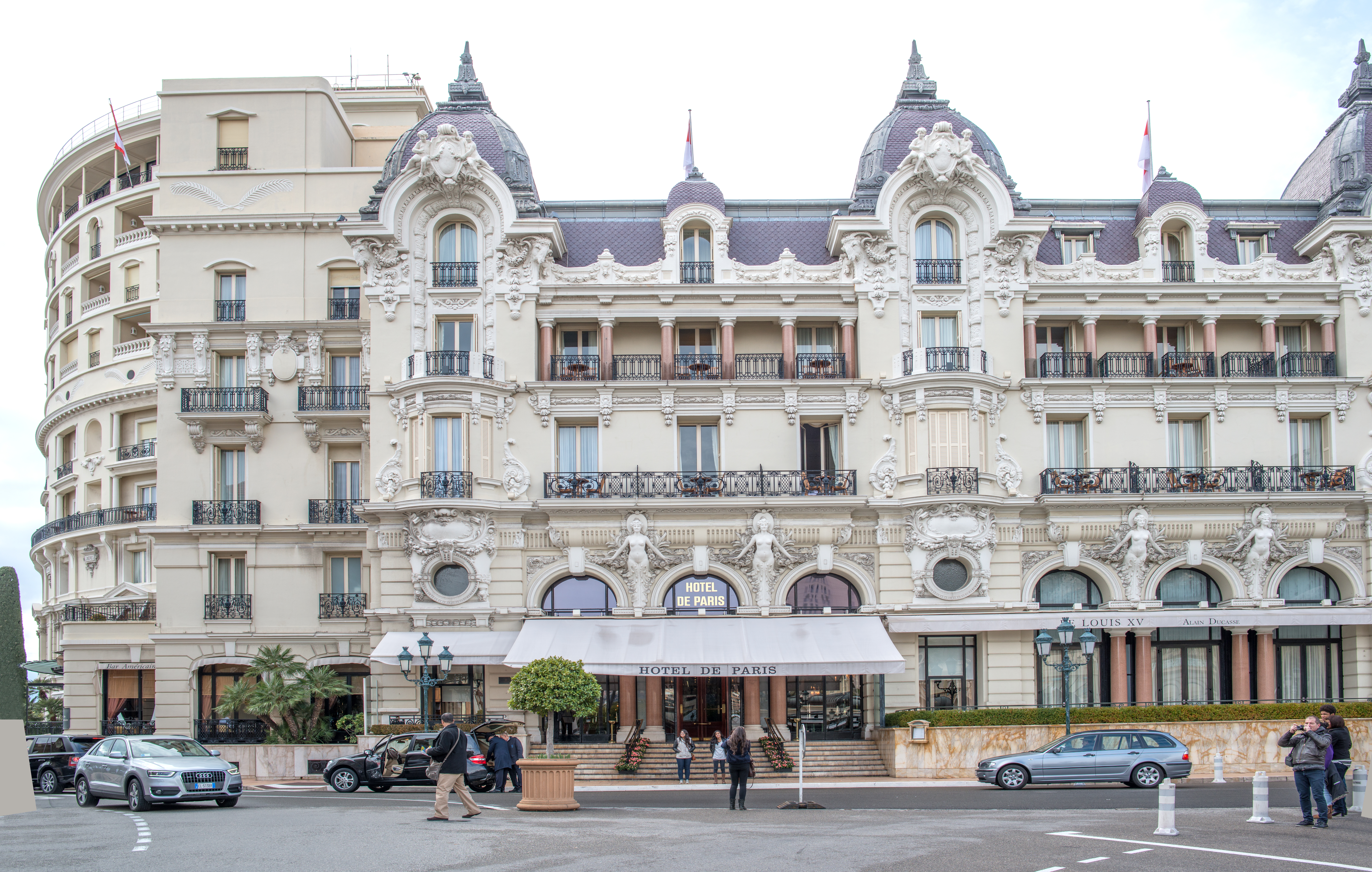
Hôtel de Paris Monte-Carlo, Monaco, completed in 1868

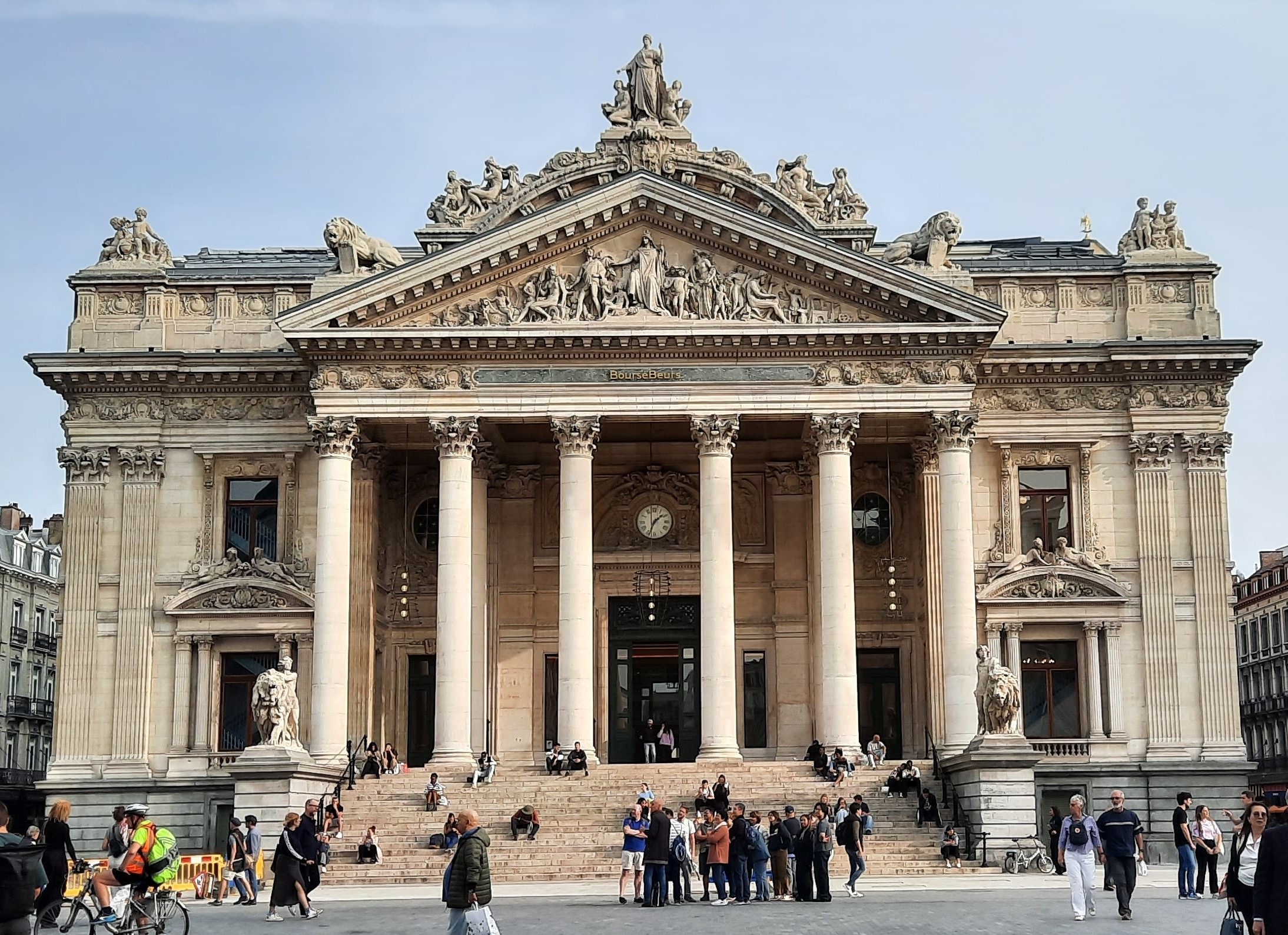
Bourse Palace, Brussels, designed by Léon Suys and built between 1868–73

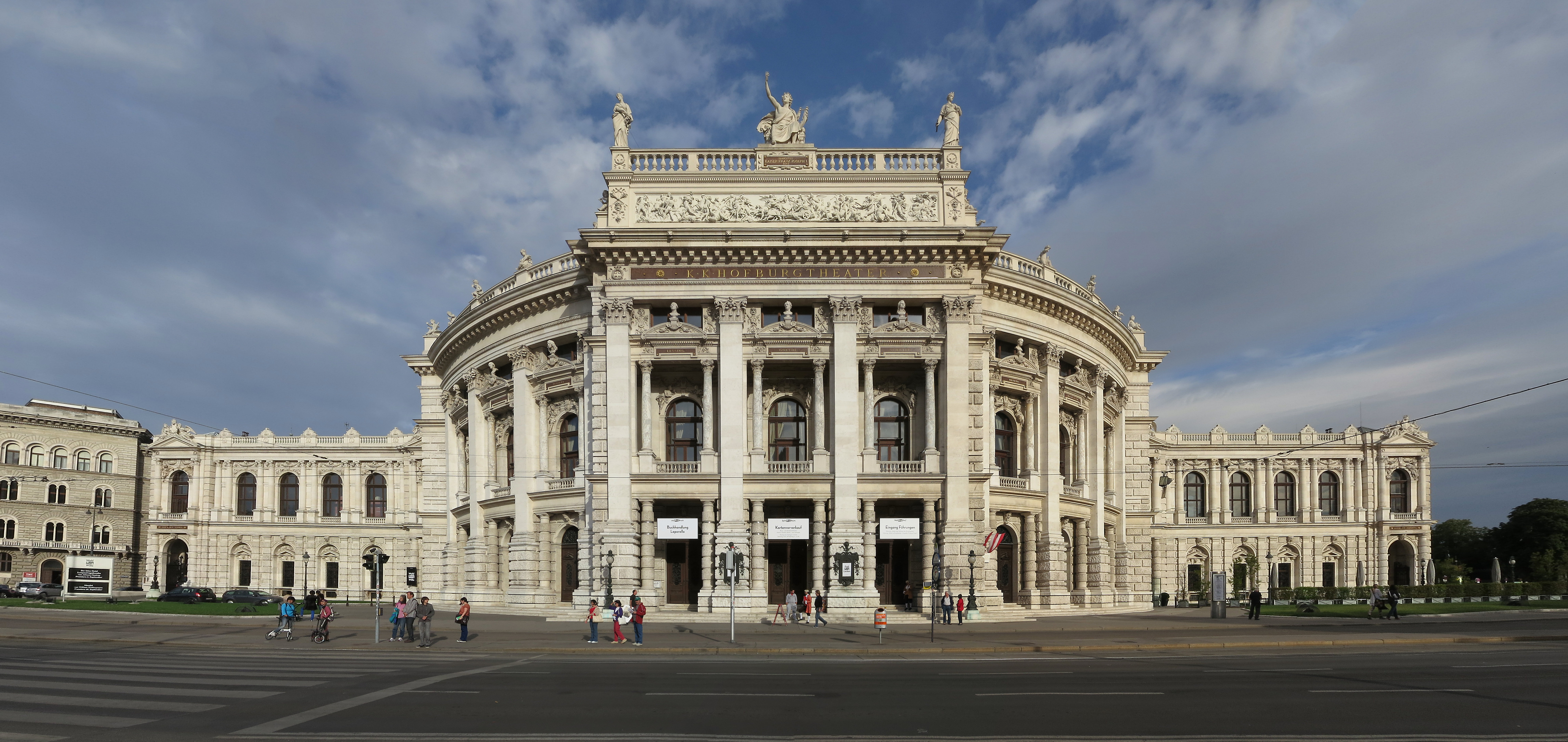
Burgtheater, Vienna, designed by Gottfried Semper and Karl Freiherr von Hasenauer and completed in 1888

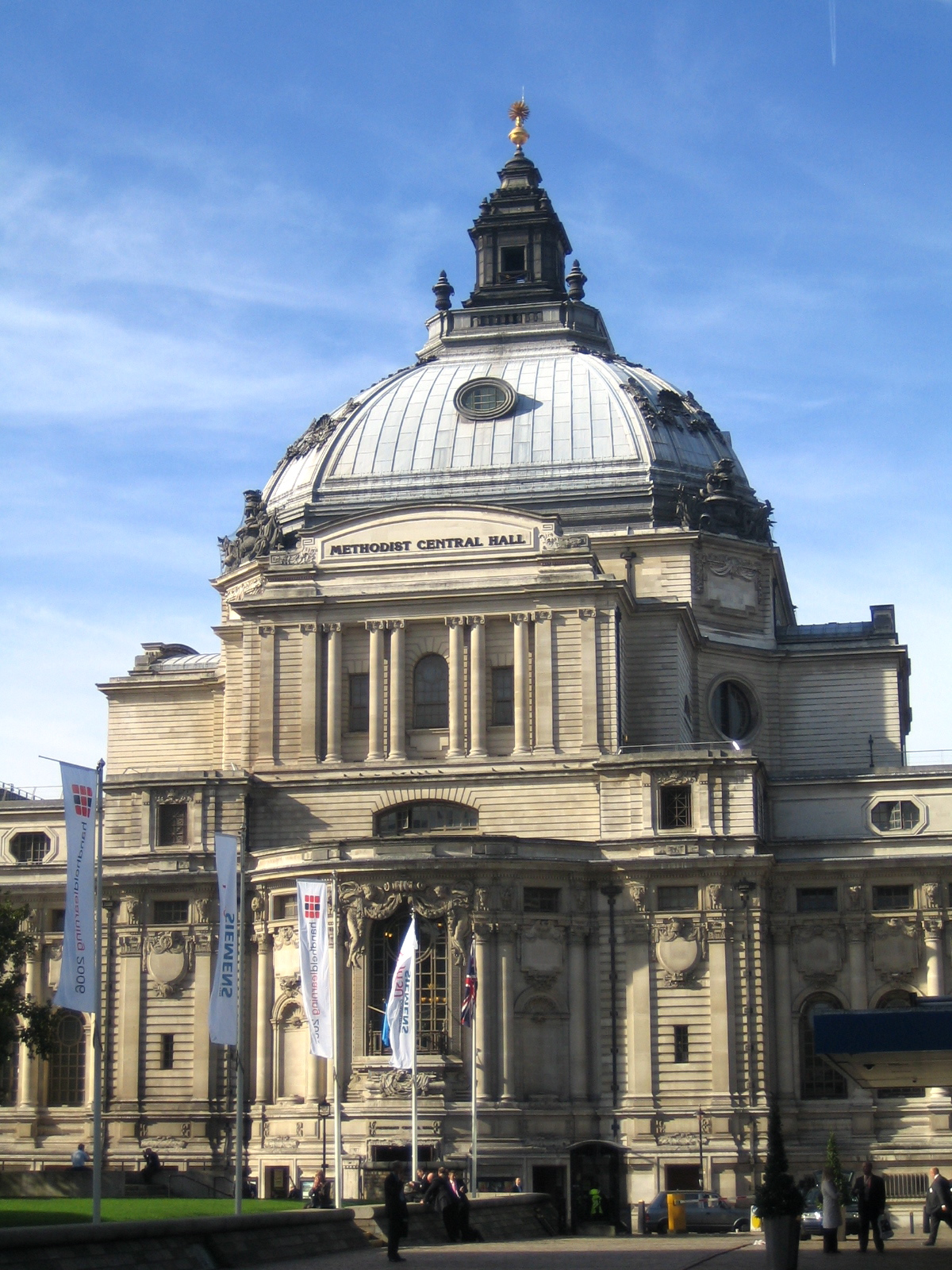
Methodist Central Hall, Westminster, completed in 1911

== See also ==
- Beaux-Arts architecture
- Second Empire architecture in the United States and Canada
