= Léon Suys =

Belgian architect

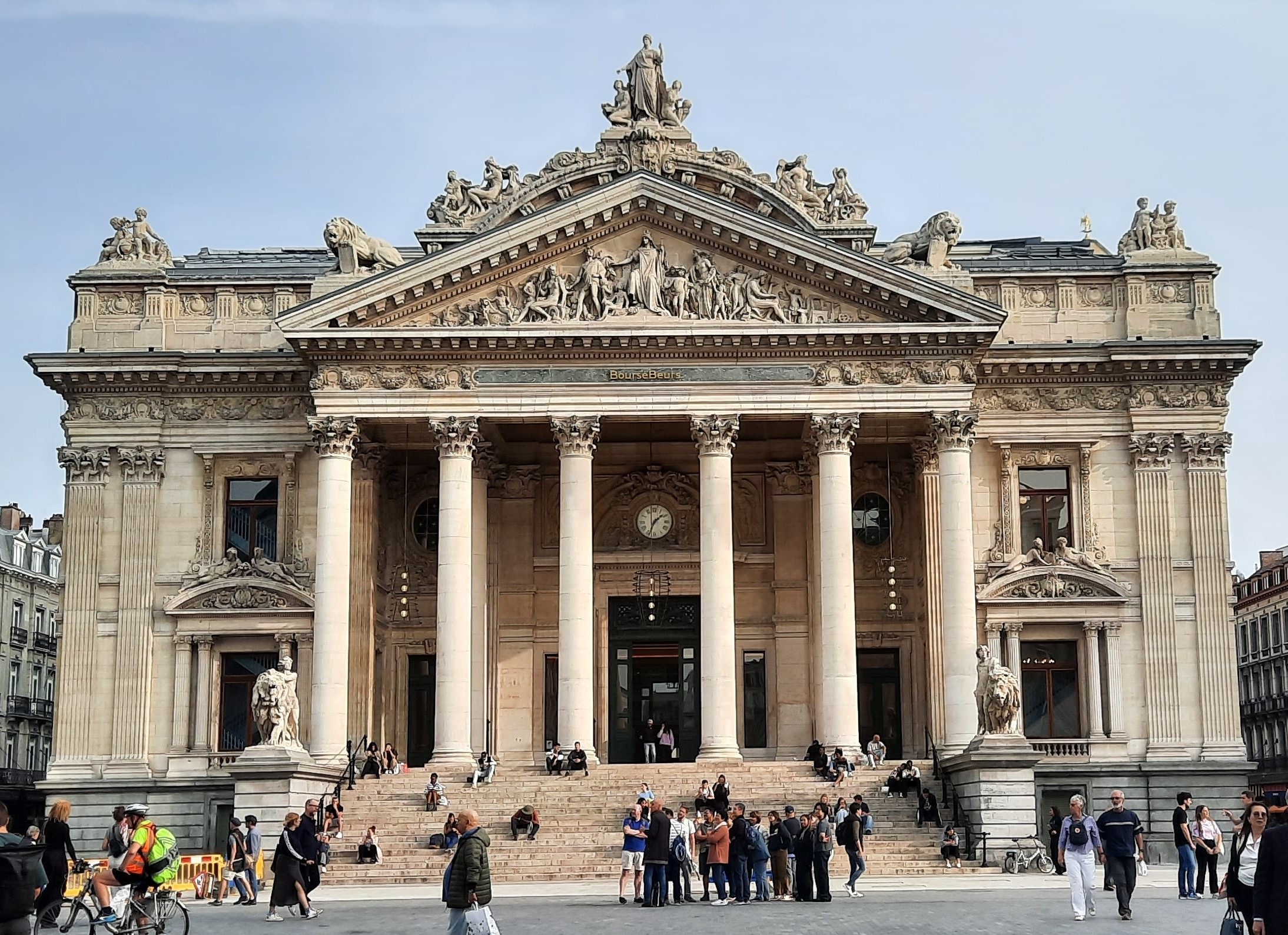
The Bourse Palace in Brussels, designed by Léon Suys and built in 1868–1873, is a prime example of the Second Empire style.

Léon-Pierre Suys (French: [leɔ̃ sɥis], Dutch: [leːˌjɔ̃ː ˈsœys]; 14 June 1823 – 5 May 1887) was a Belgian architect.

Suys's father Tilman-François Suys was the architect of King Leopold I, and the cofounder of the Belgian Royal Commission of Sites and Monuments, of which his friend François-Joseph Navez was also a member. Navez often used the young Léon as a model for his paintings, including Jeune garçon songeur (1831) and Léon Suys et ses deux sœurs.

Léon Suys was the author, in 1865, of the plans to cover and divert the Senne (Zenne) river in Brussels, a defining event in the history of the city. As part of this, he designed the modern courses of Brussels' central boulevards, and several monumental public buildings related to the project, including the Bourse Palace, the Great Central Halls (demolished in 1956), and the reconstruction of the Greater Sluice Gate at the south of the city. He also designed the buildings of the thermal baths in Spa, Belgium, built between 1862 and 1868.

Suys is buried in Laeken Cemetery.

== Literature ==
- Anne VAN LOO, L'haussmannisation de Bruxelles : la construction des boulevards du centre, 1865-1880, in: Revue de l'Art, 1994
- Herman STYNEN, De onvoltooid verleden tijd. Een geschiedenis van de monumenten- en landschapszorg in België 1835-1940, Brussel, 1998
