= Brussels tram route 3 =

Tram route in Brussels, Belgium

STIB/MIVB Route 3
- Esplanade – Churchill

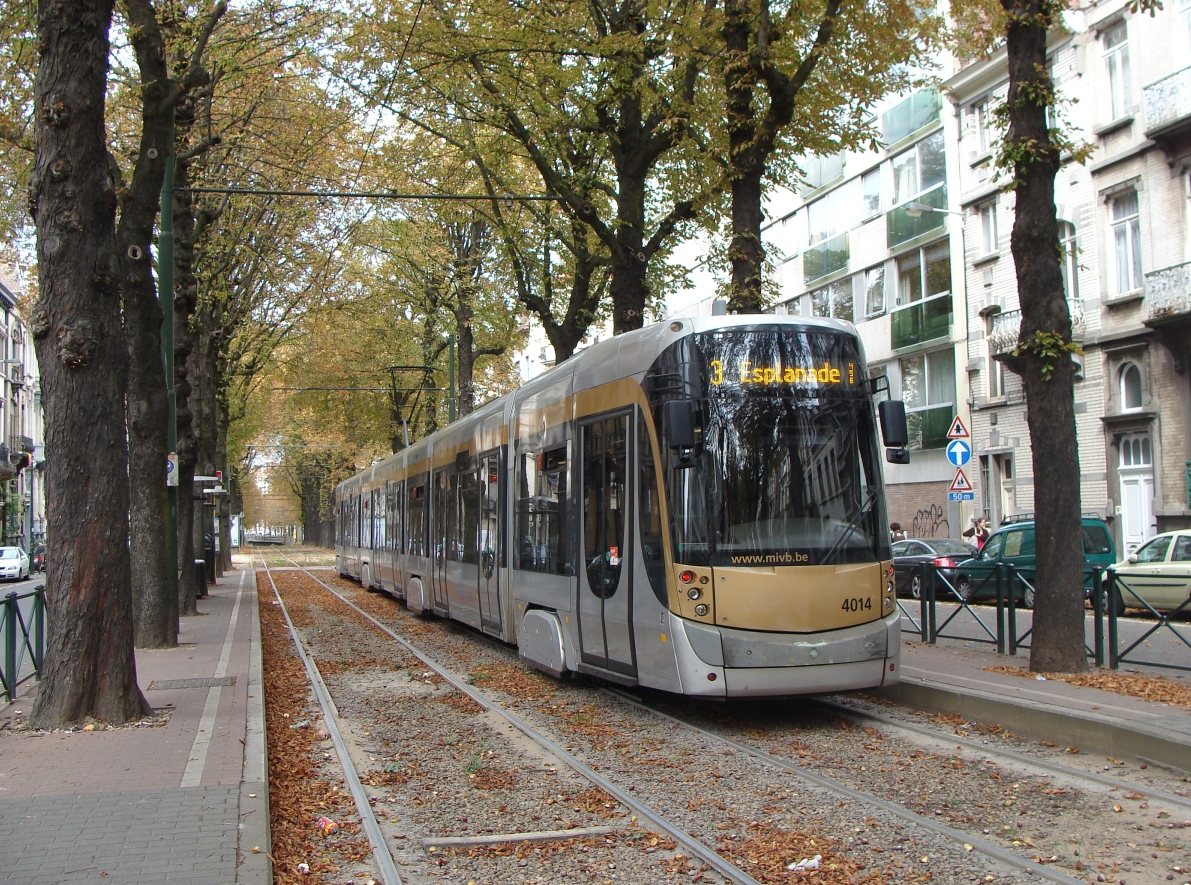
- T4014 at Berkendael/Berkendaal

Overview
- System: Brussels tramway network
- Operator: STIB/MIVB
- Depot: Haren, Ixelles
- Vehicle: T3000, T4000
- Status: Discontinued
- Began service: 30 June 2008
- Ended service: 23 September 2024

Route
- Locale: Brussels, Belgium
- Communities served: Schaerbeek; City of Brussels; Saint-Gilles; Forest; Uccle
- Start: Esplanade
- Via: North–South Axis
- End: Churchill
- Length: 13.5 km (8.4 mi)

Service
- Journey time: 46 minutes
Route map
Route 4 →

The premetro and tram route 3 in Brussels, Belgium, was operated by STIB/MIVB, and connected the Esplanade stop (on the borders of Neder-Over-Heembeek in Laeken in the City of Brussels and Strombeek-Bever) with the Churchill stop in the southern municipality of Uccle. The line was named after the planned Metro line 3, which is set to service most of the former route of tram line 3. The colour of the signage for this line was lime-green.

On 23 September 2024, the line was permanently discontinued, with most of its route being taken over by the new line 10. A further tram line 35 was established, taking over the Esplanade–Van Praet portion of line 3 and continuing on to a new terminus at Bienfaiteurs/Weldoeners.

Following its disbandment, only tram lines 4 and 10 remain in the North–South Axis that runs underneath the Pentagon (Brussels' city centre). Both lines 4 and 10 have a 6-minute schedule during rush hour and are serviced by the modern low-floor trams (Bombardier T3000 and T4000).

== History ==
The line was created on 30 June 2008, replacing tram routes 55 and 56. Together with tram routes 4, 7, 8 and 9, it was one of five 'chrono' lines, which means that it was served by low-floor high-capacity trams with a high frequency. The low line number chosen for the new line shows that it is either a metro line or a 'chrono' line.

From 31 August 2009, lines 3 and 4 changed their northern termini. Whereas line 3 used to end at Brussels-North railway station, it then continued all the way to Esplanade, while line 4 was shortened to terminate at Brussels-North. Because of this, the very long line 4 and the short line 3 were then equalised.

Before the line was taken out of service for a while, the line was serviced by both the modern low-floor trams (the T3000 and T4000), as well as the older two-part PCC-trams (T7700 and T7800). After its return in 2008, the line was serviced by the modern low-floor trams only, mostly of the T4000 type.

On 23 September 2024, the line was permanently discontinued on the occasion of the opening of the new tram line 10, which took over most of its route.

== Route ==
The route ran from Esplanade to De Wand along the N276, then follows the R21 to Van Praet, where it crossed the Brussels Canal. The route then followed the N201 along the southern side of the canal to Jules de Trooz, before cutting towards the city centre along the Avenue de la Reine/Koninginnelaan and the Boulevard Adolphe Max/Adolphe Maxlaan, connecting Brussels-North and Brussels-South stations, via Bourse - Grand-Place/Beurs - Grote Markt. The route left the city to the south through Saint-Gilles along the Rue du Lycée/Lyceumstraat and the N241 to its terminus at Churchill.

It served the following stops:

- Esplanade, serving the Brussels Exhibition Centre (Brussels Expo) site, close to the border with Flanders
- De Wand
- Araucaria
- Buissonnets/Braambosjes
- Heembeek
- Van Praet
- Docks
- Mabru
- Jules de Trooz
- Masui
- Thomas
- Gare du Nord/Noordstation
- Rogier
- De Brouckère
- Bourse - Grand-Place/Beurs - Grote Markt
- Anneessens-Fontainas
- Lemonnier
- Gare du Midi/Zuidstation
- Porte de Hal/Hallepoort
- Sint-Gillis Voorplein/Parvis de Saint-Gilles
- Horta
- Albert
- Berkendael/Berkendaal
- Vanderkindere
- Churchill

== See also ==
- List of Brussels tram routes
