= Horta premetro station =

Premetro station in Brussels, Belgium

Coordinates: 50.8261°N 4.3458°E

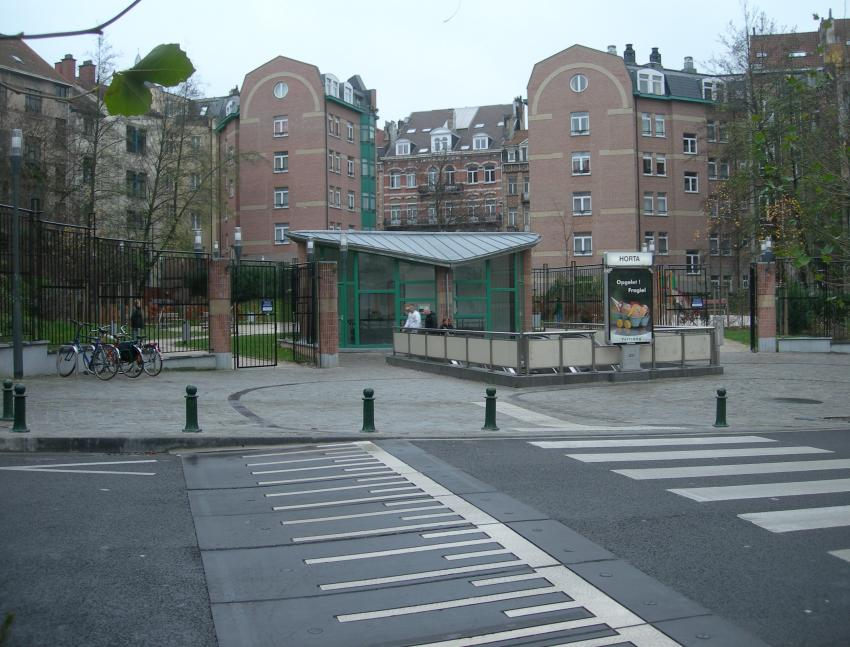
Horta premetro station

Horta (French pronunciation: [ɔʁta]) is a premetro (underground tram) station located under the Chaussée de Waterloo/Waterloosesteenweg in the Saint-Gilles municipality of Brussels, Belgium. The station is named after the Art Nouveau architect Victor Horta, who designed a number of significant buildings in the area. It opened on 3 December 1993.

The station forms part of a southerly extension to the North–South Axis, a tram tunnel crossing the city centre between Brussels-North railway station and Albert premetro station. The underground station serves the 4, 10 and 51 trams, while the 81 and 97 trams and 52 bus stop 100 metres (330 ft) to the north-west around the Barrière de Saint-Gilles/Bareel van Sint-Gillis.

In 2025, the line is scheduled to be converted to serve line 3 of the Brussels Metro, in preparation for which third rails were installed in 2021.

== Location ==
The station is unusual in that it can only be reached from the eastern end, at the entrance on the Chaussée de Waterloo/Waterloosesteenweg, whereas no entrance was built leading to the Place van Meenen/Van Meenenplein, which would have eased access to the Municipal Hall.

An underground car park occupies the space between the platforms and the small park above. This was previously the site of a nursery school, the École gardienne no. 1, the municipality's first and biggest. Opened in 1864, it catered for 533 children in 10 classes, and had two playgrounds and a canteen.

In 2023, a block of flats with cycle parking was being built over the entrance to the east of the Chaussée de Waterloo, on a corner plot that had been empty since the tunnel was dug. The project was abandoned, however, in 2024, due to water infiltrations. A "lighter" project, which will green the street corner, is in preparation.

== Interior and art ==
Decorative ironwork and stained glass designed by Victor Horta for the Maison du Peuple/Volkshuis and the Hôtel Aubecq, which were demolished in the 1950s and 1960s respectively, is on display in the station.

The interior tilework is grey. The station is a favourite hangout for adolescents, and STIB/MIVB security officers, community wardens and police are often in attendance. On 22 January 2012, following the eviction of squatters from one of the technical rooms, the station suffered a graffiti attack of such scale (paint had been splashed carelessly all the way along the walls) that it was closed for 24 hours while it was cleaned.

== See also ==
- Transport in Brussels
- History of Brussels
