= Parvis de Saint-Gilles premetro station =

Premetro station in Brussels, Belgium

Coordinates: 50.830556°N 4.3452778°E

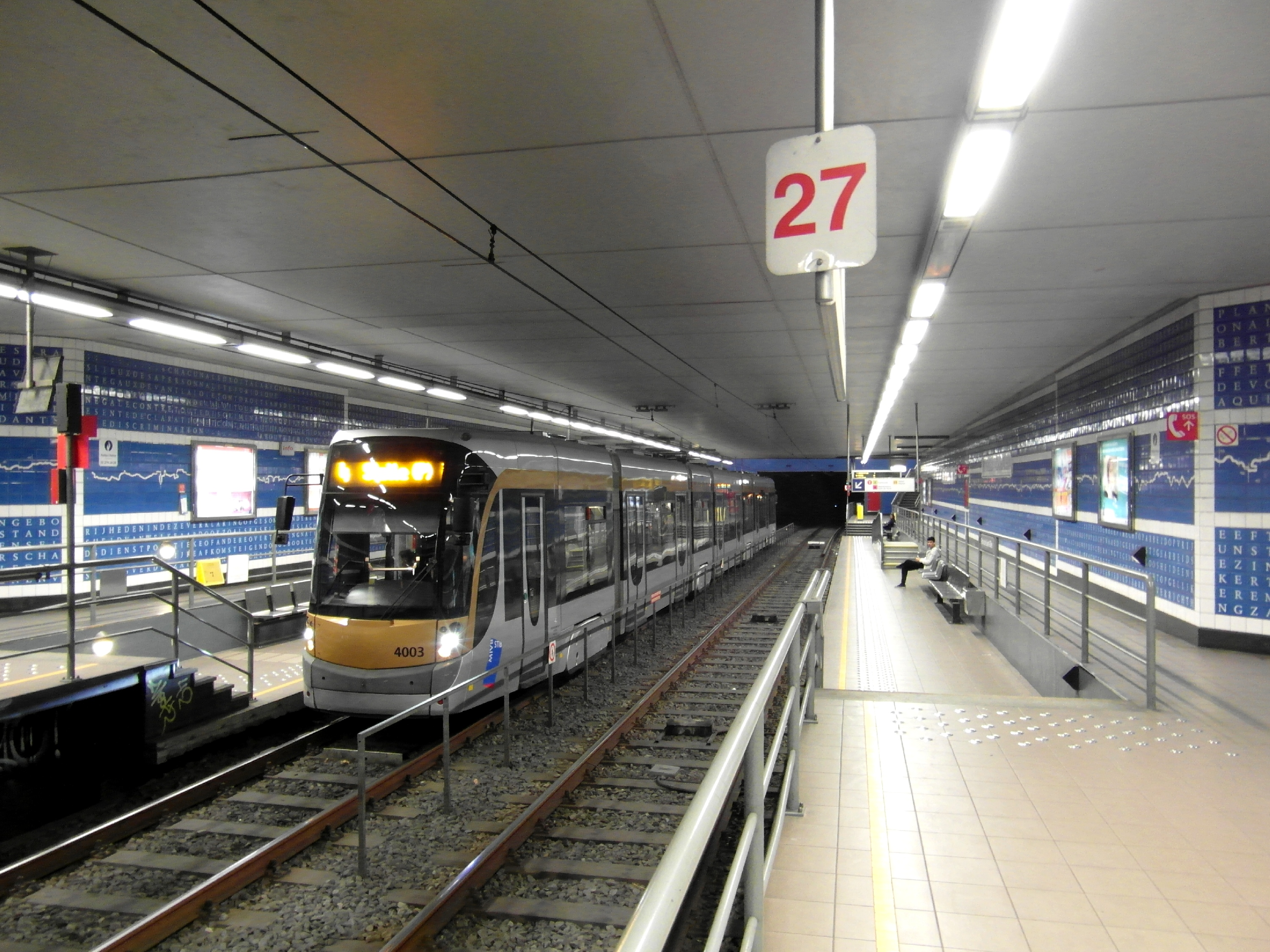
Parvis de Saint-Gilles/Sint-Gillisvoorplein premetro station

Parvis de Saint-Gilles (French) or Sint-Gillisvoorplein (Dutch) is a premetro (underground tram) station located in the Saint-Gilles municipality of Brussels, Belgium. The main entrance is from the Parvis de Saint-Gilles/Sint-Gillisvoorplein, after which it is named. It opened on 3 December 1993.

The station forms part of a southerly extension to the North–South Axis, a tram tunnel crossing the city centre between Brussels-North railway station and Albert premetro station. The underground station serves the 4, 10 and 51 trams and there is also a surface connection to the 48 bus route.

The walls of the station are covered with blue tiles inscribed with the text of the Universal Declaration of Human Rights, in French and Dutch. This work, entitled Dyad, was undertaken by the artist Françoise Schein.

== Area ==
The Church of St. Gilles, which dominates the site, was designed in eclectic style by the architect Victor Besme and built in the 1860s. It replaced an earlier church, on which work commenced in 1595 but did not finish until 1765, which itself had replaced a 13th-century building that was demolished in 1578 to strengthen the fortifications of Brussels.

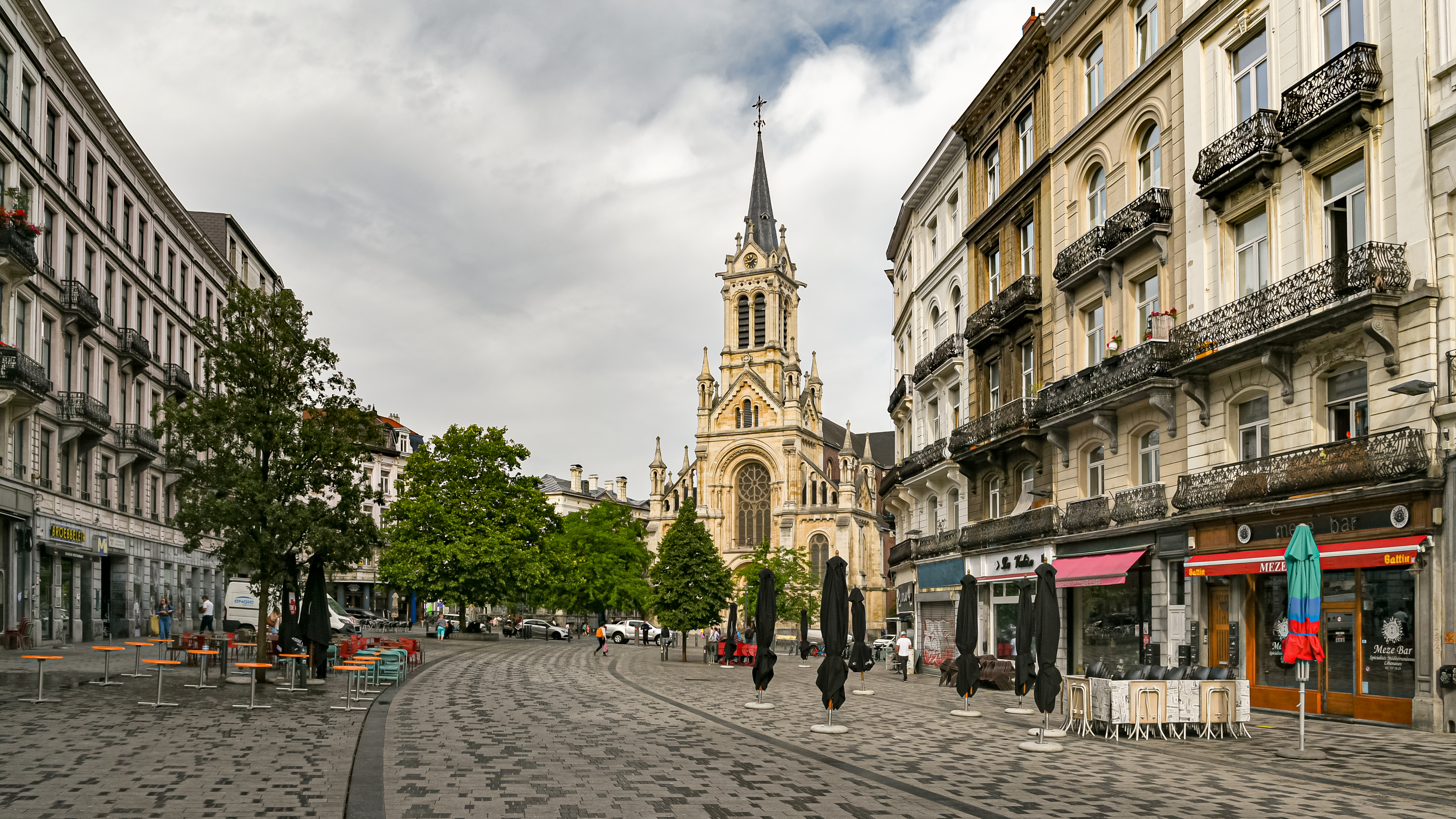
Entrance on the Parvis de Saint-Gilles/Sint-Gillisvoorplein marked with "M" logo sign

== See also ==
- Transport in Brussels
- History of Brussels
