= Lemonnier premetro station =

Premetro station in Brussels, Belgium

Coordinates: 50.840146°N 4.3411°E

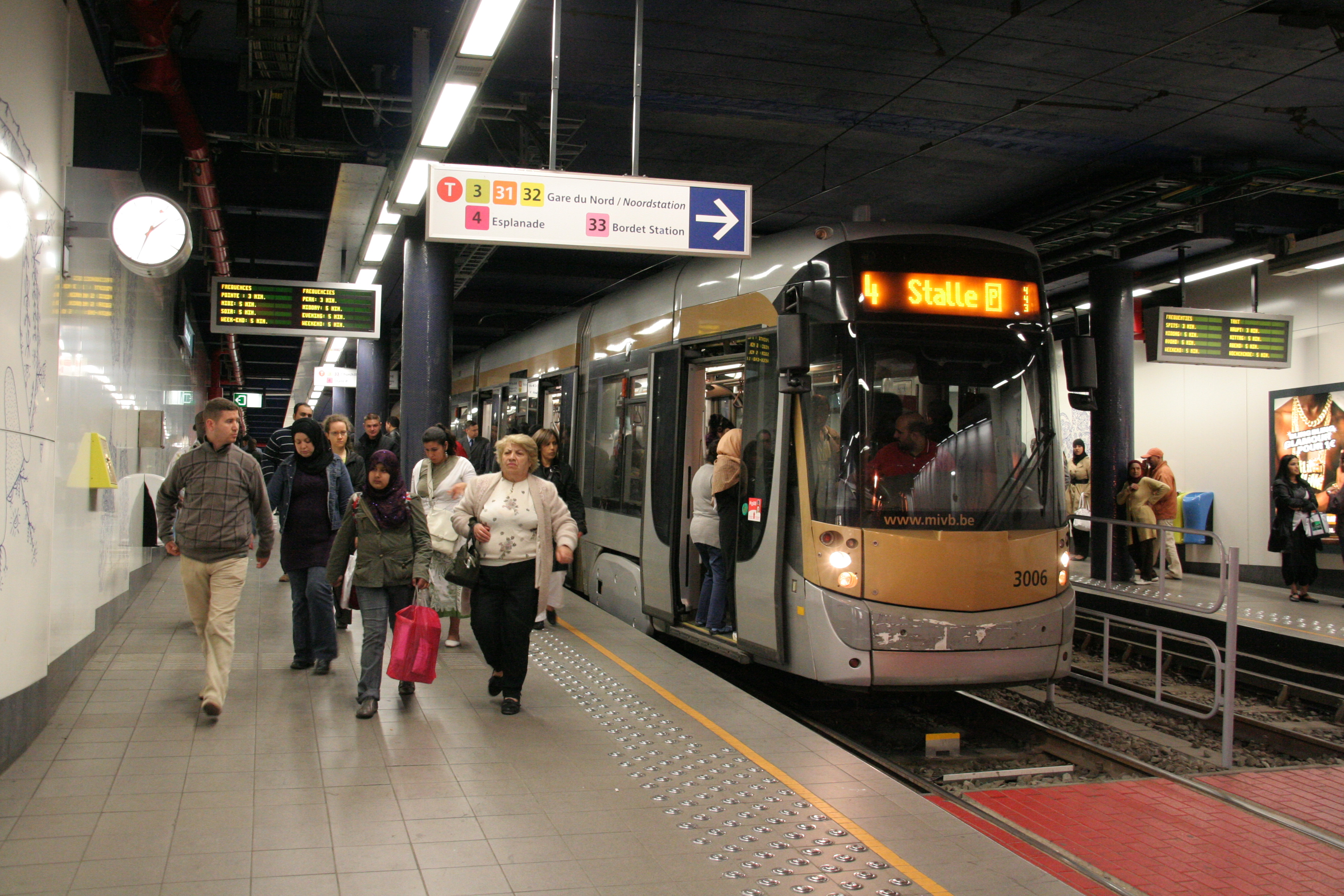
Lemonnier premetro station

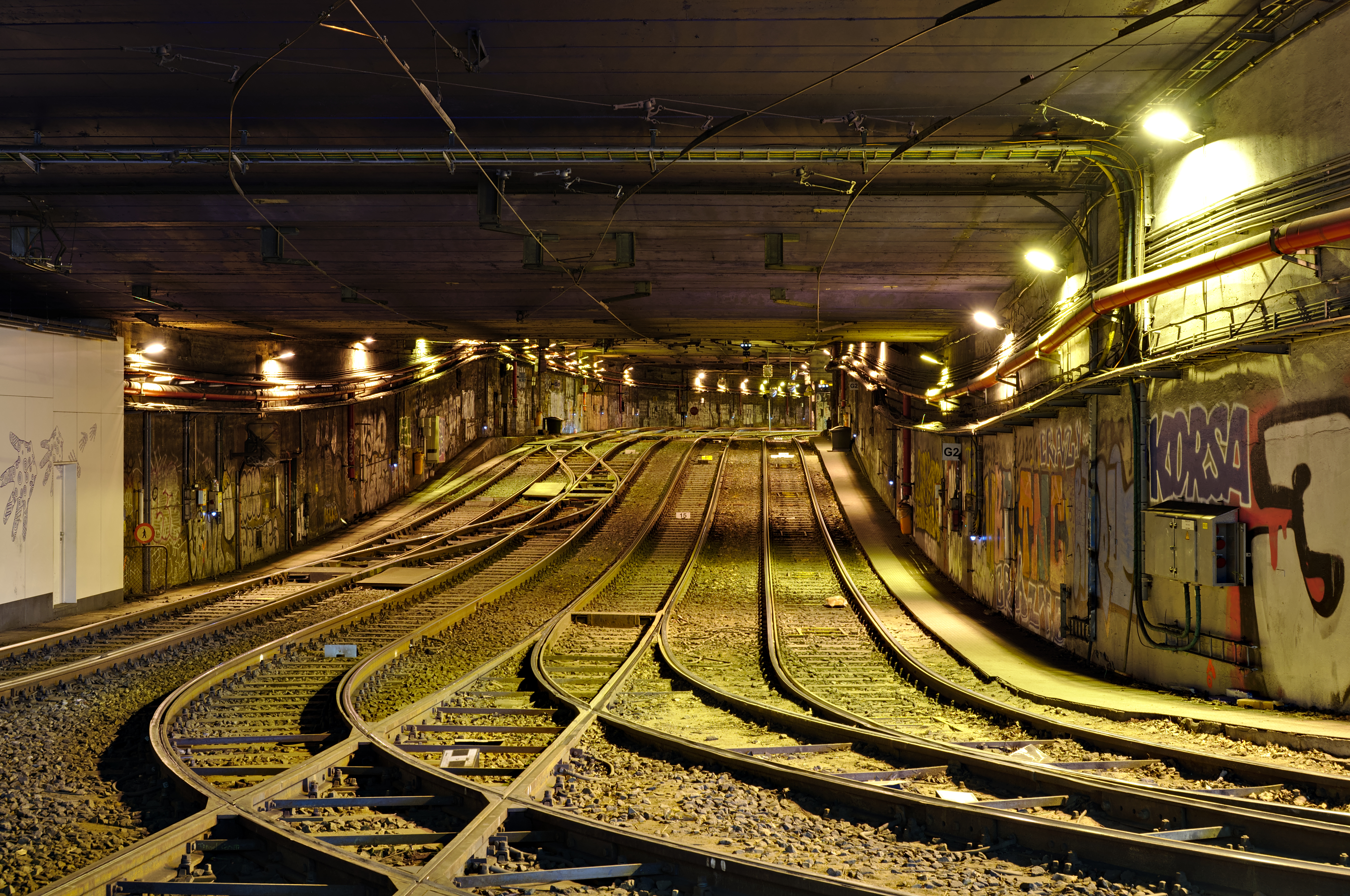
Lemonnier premetro tunnel

Lemonnier (French pronunciation: [ləmɔnje]) is a premetro (underground tram) station in central Brussels, Belgium, located near the crossroads between the Boulevard Maurice Lemonnier/Maurice Lemonnierlaan and the Small Ring (Brussels' inner ring road).

The station is part of the North–South Axis, a tram tunnel crossing the city centre between Brussels-North railway station and Albert premetro station. Additional tunnel exits exist at Brussels-South railway station, as well as at Lemonnier, allowing trams to leave or enter the tunnel at those points. Tram routes 51 and 82 enter the tunnel at Lemonnier towards the south. Tram routes 4 and 10 also stop at this station.

The station is decorated with paintings by the artist Hamsi Boubeker. On a lower floor, there is unused second station with two platforms. In the tunnel between Anneessens-Fontainas and Lemonnier, there is a tunnel towards this station.

== Future ==
As part of the conversion of the North–South Axis of the Brussels premetro to become line 3 of the Brussels Metro, the new Toots Thielemans metro station is being built in parallel to Lemonnier and will replace the platforms currently used by lines 4 and 10. Lemonnier is the only station in the North–South Axis that will not be converted to a metro standard. Lemonnier will remain in use as an underground tram stop for several tram lines that still use the Constitution Tunnel and will also be renovated. Lemonnier will also be connected to the new Toots Thielemans station by means of a connecting corridor.

== See also ==
- Transport in Brussels
- History of Brussels
