= Brussels tram route 51 =

Tram route in Brussels, Belgium

STIB/MIVB Route 51
- Heysel/Heizel – Van Haelen
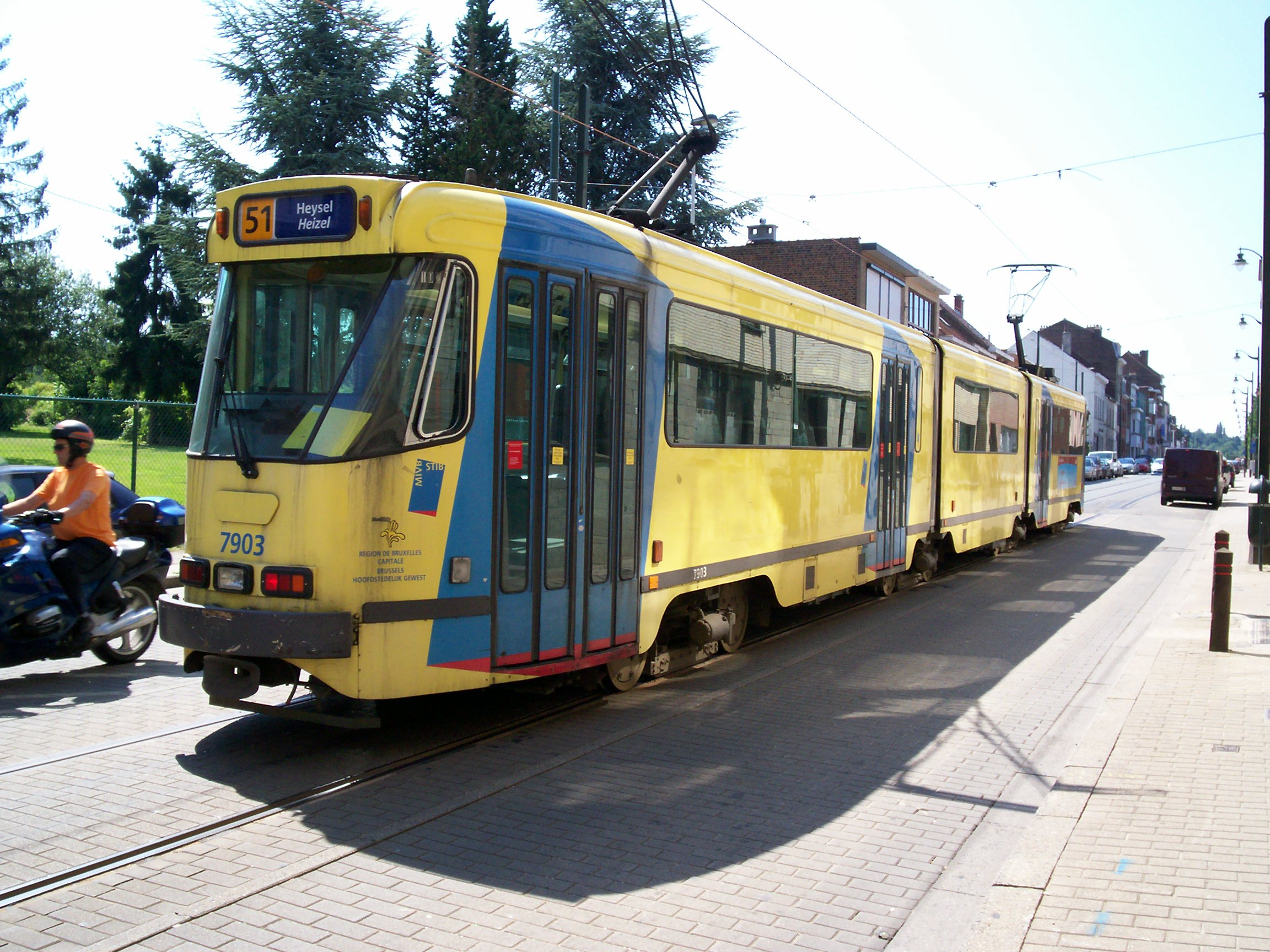
- PCC 7903 at Silence

Overview
- System: Brussels tramway network
- Operator: STIB/MIVB
- Depot: Saint-Gilles, Molenbeek-Saint-Jean
- Vehicle: PCC 7700/7800; PCC 7900
- Status: Operational
- Began service: 30 June 2008

Route
- Locale: Brussels, Belgium
- Communities served: City of Brussels; Jette; Molenbeek-Saint-Jean; Saint-Gilles; Forest; Uccle
- Start: Stade / Stadion
- Via: North–South Axis
- End: Van Haelen
- Length: 15 km (9.3 mi)

Service
- Journey time: 60 minutes
Route map


The tram route 51 in Brussels, Belgium, is operated by STIB/MIVB, and connects Heysel/Heizel metro station in Laeken in the City of Brussels to the Van Haelen stop in the southern municipality of Uccle. The route runs north–south, crossing the City of Brussels, Jette, Molenbeek-Saint-Jean, the City of Brussels again, Saint-Gilles, Forest and Uccle. Currently, service is interrupted between Brussels-South railway station and Altitude Cent/Hoogte Honderd due to construction work at Albert premetro station.

== Route ==
Starting from the Stade/Stadion stop, the route runs along with tram route 23 in reserved track parallel to the Boulevard du Centenaire/Eeuwfeestlaan up to the Centenaire/Eeuwfeest stop. At this point, route 23 turns off to the left and route 51 turns right, joining tram route 19 on the Avenue Jean Sobieski/Jan Sobieskilaan. The route then follows the Boulevard de Smet de Naeyer/De Smet de Naeyerlaan, offering transit with the Metro again at Stuyvenbergh. Past Jette Cemetery, routes 19 and 51 separate, with route 51 heading towards Belgica metro station via the Avenue Charles Woeste/Charles Woestelaan, and then towards Ribaucourt metro station via the Boulevard Belgica/Belgicalaan and the Boulevard du Jubilé/Jubelfeestlaan. At Ribaucourt, the route joins the Small Ring (Brussels' inner ring road) at the Place Sainctelette/Saincteletteplein via the Boulevard Léopold II/Leopold II-laan, crosses the Brussels Canal, connects with the Metro at Yser/IJzer, enters the Pentagon (Brussels' city centre), then runs alongside the canal up to the Ninove Gate. At this point, route 51 joins tram route 82, running along the Small Ring up to Brussels-South railway station via Lemonnier premetro station, where it enters the North–South Axis in Saint-Gilles up to Albert premetro station. These stops from Lemonnier to Albert connect with tram routes 3 and 4. When exiting the tunnel, route 51 heads towards the Place de l'Altitude Cent/Hoogte Honderdplein, then joins the Chaussée d'Alsemberg/Alsembergsesteenweg up to Uccle-Calevoet railway station, then joins again the Chaussée d'Alsemberg via the Rue d'Angleterre/Engelandstraat and the Rue du Château d'Or/Gulden Kasteelstraat. It then stops at the Van Haelen stop on the Chaussée d'Alsemberg at the border between the Brussels-Capital Region and the Flemish municipality of Linkebeek.

Until September 2023, trams will not run between Brussels-South and Altitude Cent/Hoogte Honderd, splitting the line into a northern segment running from Stade/Stadion to Brussels-South and a southern segment running from Van Haelen to Altitude Cent/Hoogte Honderd. This is due to construction work at Albert station which will make it inaccessible to route 51. The work at Albert station is part of a project to upgrade it from a premetro (underground tram) station to a multimodal full metro station in preparation for the future Metro line 3.

== See also ==
- List of Brussels tram routes
