= Brussels tram route 82 =

Tram route in Brussels, Belgium

STIB/MIVB Route 82
- Berchem Station – Drogenbos Château/Kasteel
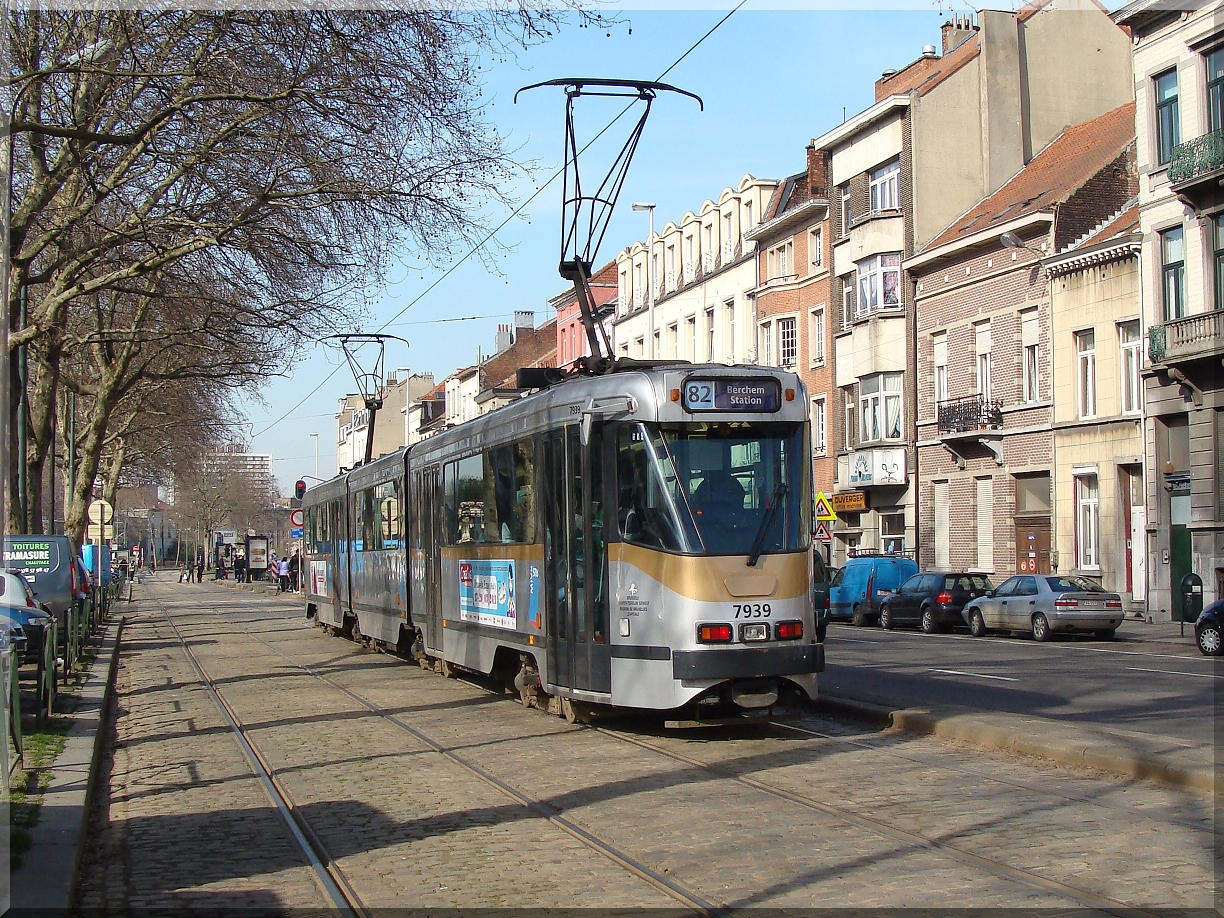
- 7939 on the Boulevard de l'Abattoir/Slachthuislaan

Overview
- System: Brussels tramway network
- Operator: STIB/MIVB
- Depot: Saint-Gilles, Molenbeek-Saint-Jean
- Vehicle: T3000
- Status: Operational
- Began service: 4 December 1993

Route
- Locale: Brussels, Belgium
- Communities served: Berchem-Sainte-Agathe; Molenbeek-Saint-Jean; City of Brussels; Saint-Gilles; Forest; Uccle; Drogenbos
- Start: Berchem Station
- Via: North–South Axis
- End: Drogenbos Château/Kasteel
- Length: 13.4 km (8.3 mi)

Service
- Journey time: 55 minutes
Route map


The tram route 82 in Brussels, Belgium, is operated by STIB/MIVB, and connects Berchem-Sainte-Agathe railway station in Berchem-Sainte-Agathe to Drogenbos Castle in the Flemish municipality of Drogenbos. After 8 p.m., the route terminates at Brussels-South railway station, with connections to Drogenbos provided by tram route 32.

== Route ==
Starting from Berchem-Sainte-Agathe railway station, with the terminus on the Place de la Gare/Stationplein, the route runs on the Chaussée de Gand/Gentsesteenweg towards Molenbeek-Saint-Jean, crossing the Avenue Charles Quint/Keizer Karellaan, the Place Docteur Schweitzer/Dokter Schweitzerplein, where it crosses tram route 19 and the Boulevard Louis Mettewie/Louis Mettewielaan past Molenbeek-Saint-Jean Cemetery. The route then turns right on the Avenue Brigade Piron/Brigade Pironlaan, crosses Marie-José Park via the Avenue Joseph Baeck/Joseph Baecklaan and then offers transit with the Metro at Brussels-West Station (also railway). The route continues on the Chaussée de Ninove/Ninoofsesteenweg up to the Ninove Gate on the Small Ring (Brussels' inner ring road), where it enters the City of Brussels. At this point, route 82 joins tram route 51, running along the Small Ring up to Brussels-South railway station via Lemonnier premetro station, where it enters the North–South Axis in Saint-Gilles up to Brussels-South. When exiting the tunnel, route 82 runs on the Avenue Fonsny/Fonsnylaan, then on the Avenue Van Volxem/Van Volxemlaan in Forest, the Chaussée de Bruxelles/Brusselse Steenweg, the Chaussée de Neerstalle/Neerstalle Steenweg past the Place Saint-Denis/Sint-Denijsplein up to the junction with the Rue de Stalle/Stallestraat in the municipality of Uccle. At this junction, there is a connection with tram routes 4 and 97. Route 82 then continues on the Rue de l'Etoile/Sterstraat and finally leaves the Brussels-Capital Region to enter the municipality of Drogenbos, where it stops twice before the last stop at Drogenbos Castle.

== See also ==
- List of Brussels tram routes
