= Bourse - Grand-Place premetro station =

Premetro station in Brussels, Belgium

Bourse - Grand-Place Beurs - Grote Markt
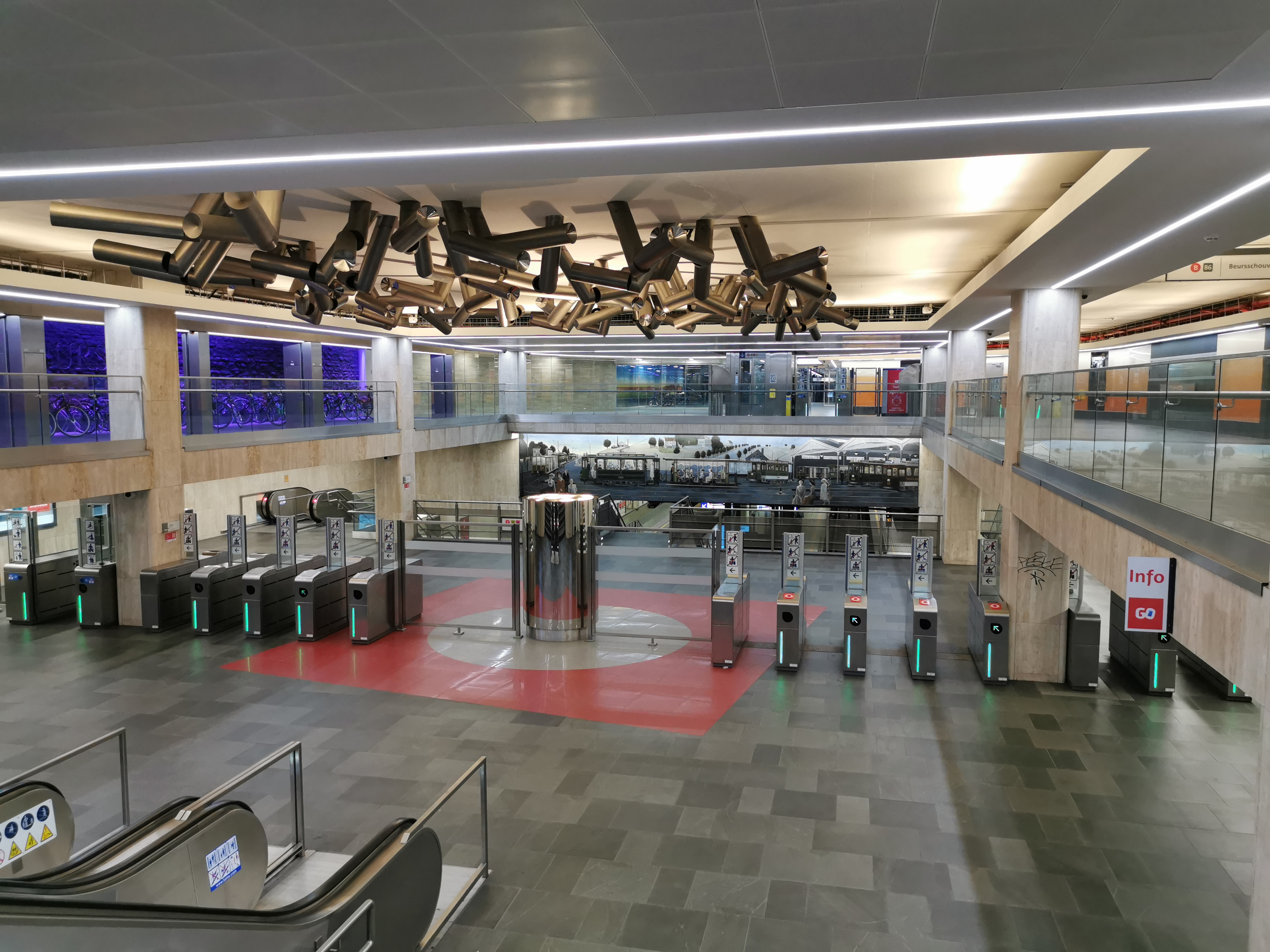
- Bourse - Grand-Place/Beurs - Grote Markt premetro station

General information
- Location: Place de la Bourse / Beursplein; 1000 City of Brussels, Brussels-Capital Region; Belgium
- Coordinates: 50°50′54″N 4°20′58″E
- System: Brussels premetro
- Transit authority: STIB/MIVB
- Lines: Line 4; Line 10
Location

Bourse - Grand-Place (French, pronounced [buʁs ɡʁɑ̃ plas]) or Beurs - Grote Markt (Dutch, pronounced [ˈbøːrs ˌxroːtə ˈmɑr(ə)kt]) is a premetro (underground tram) station in central Brussels, Belgium, located under the Boulevard Anspach/Anspachlaan, next to the Place de la Bourse/Beursplein and the Bourse Palace, after which it is named. It is also located metres from the Grand-Place/Grote Markt (Brussels' main square).

The station is part of the North–South Axis, a tram tunnel crossing the city centre between Brussels-North railway station and Albert premetro station. Brussels trams stopping at that station are the lines 4 and 10. A connection with bus routes 46, 48, 86 and 95 is possible at ground level.

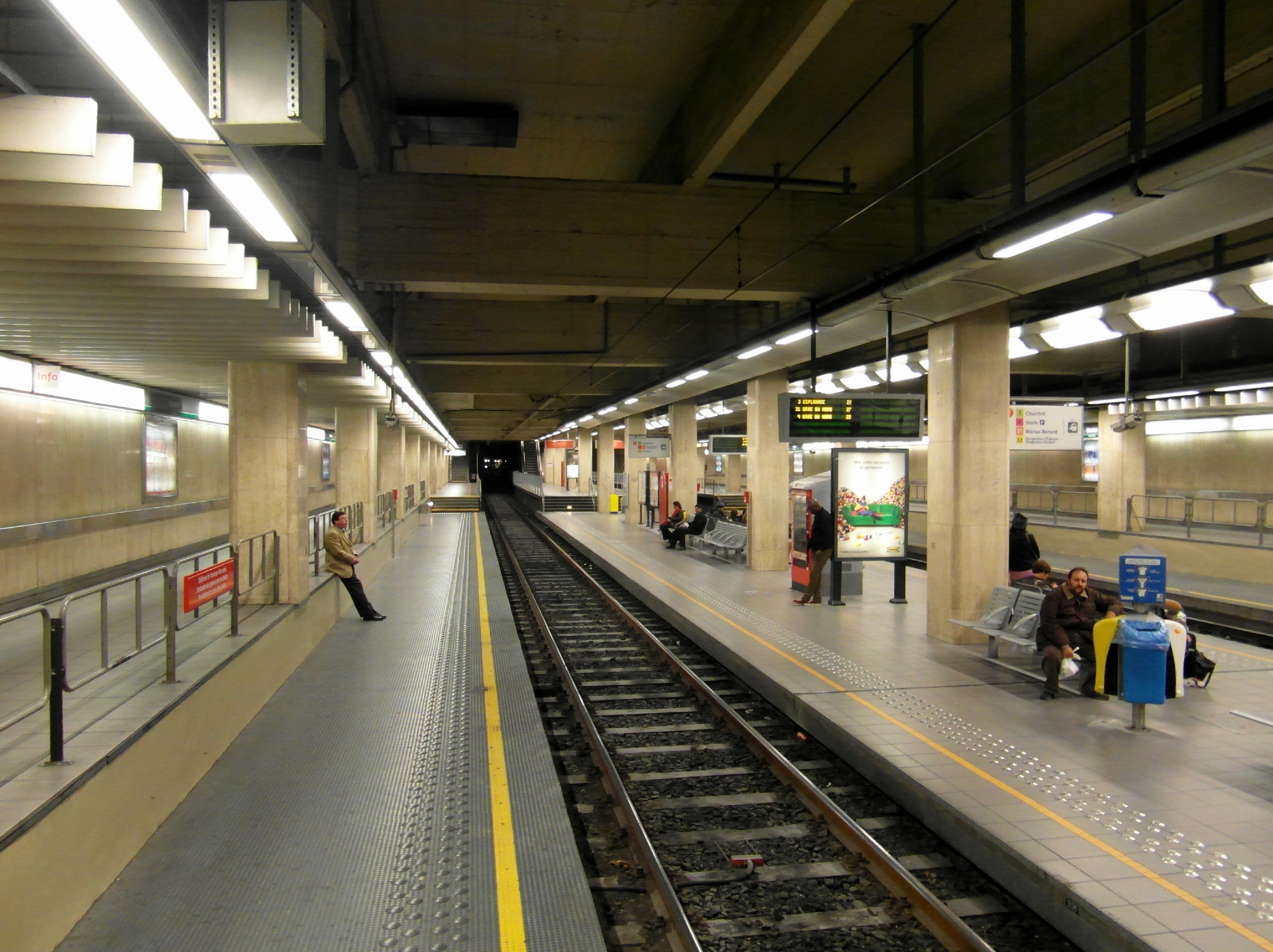
View of the platforms

== See also ==
- Transport in Brussels
- History of Brussels
