= Brussels tram route 55 =

Tram route in Brussels, Belgium

STIB/MIVB Route 55
- Da Vinci – Rogier
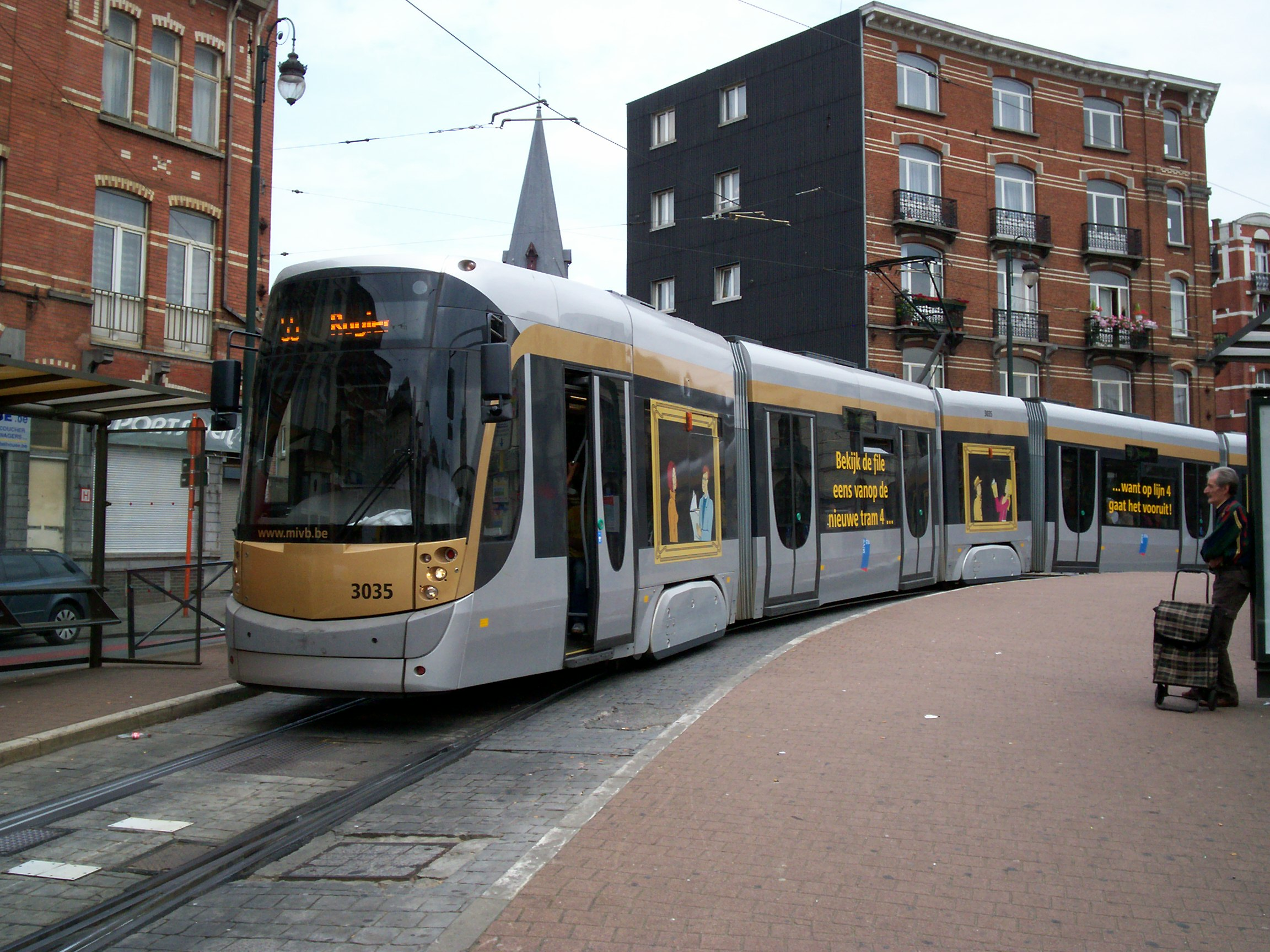
- T3035 at Verboekhoven

Overview
- System: Brussels tramway network
- Operator: STIB/MIVB
- Depot: Haren, Schaerbeek
- Vehicle: T3000
- Status: Operational
- Began service: 6 July 1968

Route
- Locale: Brussels, Belgium
- Communities served: Evere; Schaerbeek; City of Brussels
- Start: Da Vinci
- End: Rogier
- Length: 5.9 km (3.7 mi)

Service
- Journey time: 20 minutes
Route map


The tram route 55 in Brussels, Belgium, is operated by STIB/MIVB, and connects Bordet railway station in the municipality of Evere, north-east of Brussels, to Rogier metro station in the City of Brussels. The route also crosses the municipalities of Saint-Josse and Schaerbeek. The route was cut in the 2000s with STIB/MIVB willing to reduce the number of tram routes riding in the North–South Axis. Prior to this, the route went on up to the southern municipality of Uccle at the Silence stop. A part of this section is now served by Brussels tram route 51.

== See also ==
- List of Brussels tram routes
