= Rogier metro station =

Metro station in Brussels, Belgium

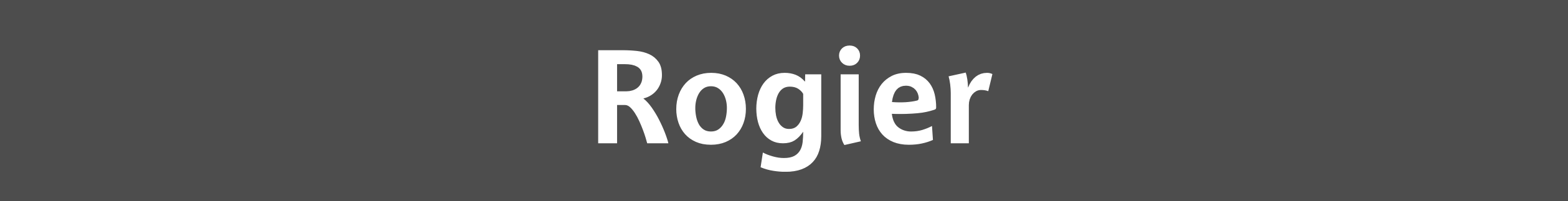

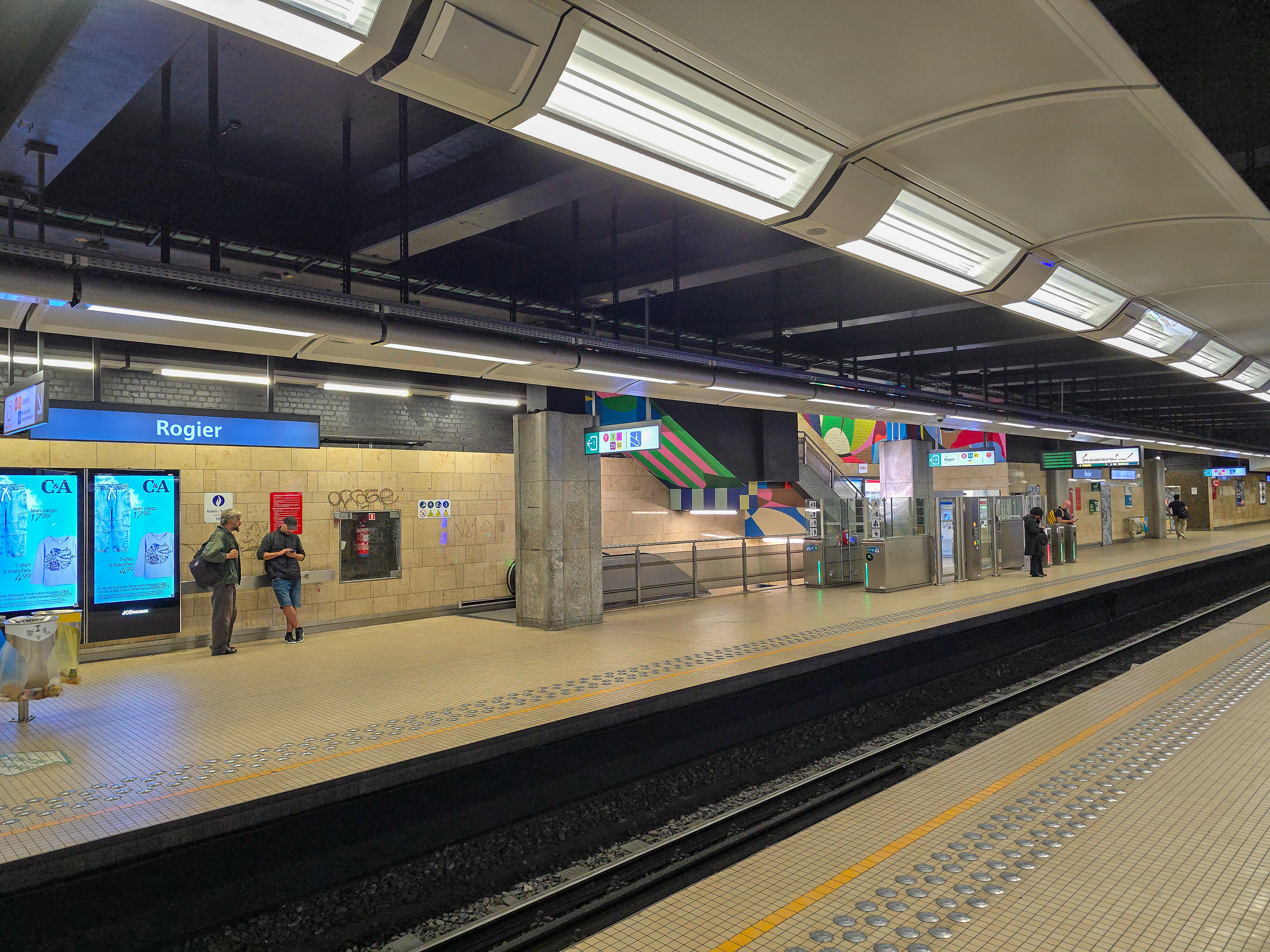
- Rogier metro station

General information
- Location: Place Charles Rogier / Karel Rogierplein; 1210 Saint-Josse-ten-Noode, Brussels-Capital Region, Belgium
- Coordinates: 50°51′19.5″N 4°21′30″E
- Owner: STIB/MIVB
- Platforms: 2 side platforms and 1 island platform (metro); 2 side platforms and 1 island platform (premetro)
- Tracks: 2 (metro); 2 (premetro)
- Connections: Line 3 Line 4

Construction
- Structure type: Underground

History
- Opened: 18 August 1974; 52 years ago (premetro); 2 October 1988; 37 years ago (metro)

Services
Preceding station	Brussels Metro	Following station
Yser/IJzer towards Elisabeth	Line 2	Botanique/Kruidtuin towards Simonis
Yser/IJzer towards Elisabeth	Line 6	Botanique/Kruidtuin towards King Baudouin
Location

Rogier (French pronunciation: [ʁɔʒje]) is a rapid transit station in Brussels, Belgium, consisting of both a metro station (on the northern segment of lines 2 and 6) and a premetro (underground tram) station (serving lines 4 and 10 on the North–South Axis between Brussels-North railway station and Albert premetro station). It is located under the Small Ring (Brussels' inner ring road) at the Place Charles Rogier/Karel Rogierplein in the municipality of the Saint-Josse-ten-Noode, north of the City of Brussels. The station takes its name from that aboveground square, itself named after Charles Rogier, Belgium's 13th Prime Minister.

The station on the Small Ring opened on 18 August 1974 as a premetro station, and on 4 October 1976, a second premetro station on the North–South Axis was opened under the Small Ring station. The first premetro station became a heavy metro station, serving line 2, when this line under the Small Ring was converted on 2 October 1988. Then, following the reorganisation of the Brussels Metro on 4 April 2009, it now lies on the joint section of lines 2 and 6.

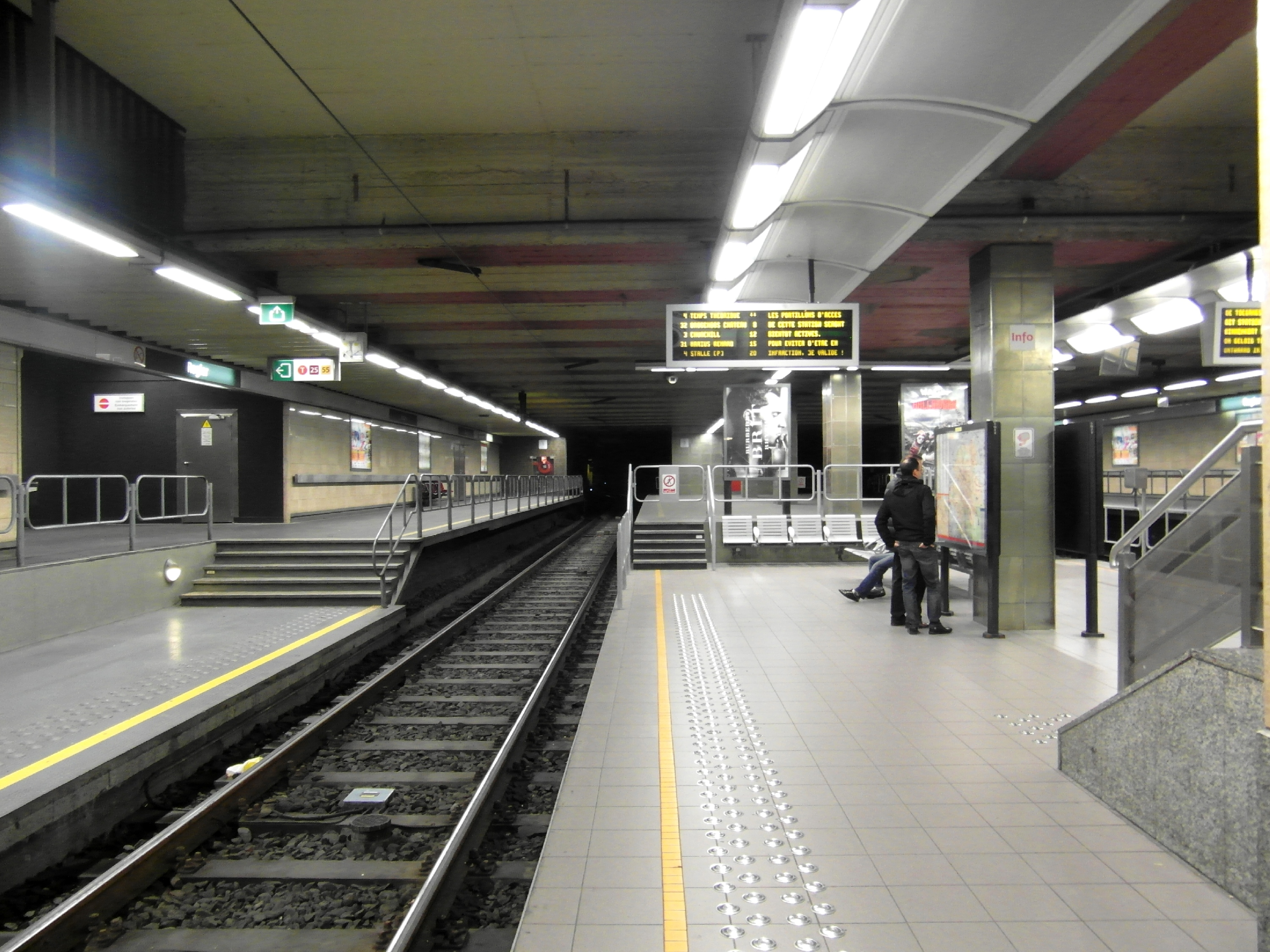
Rogier premetro station

== See also ==
- Transport in Brussels
- History of Brussels
