= List of Brussels tram routes =

This is a list of Brussels tram routes as of November 2024:

- tram route 4: from Stalle Parking to Brussels-North
- tram route 7: from Vanderkindere to Heysel/Heizel
- tram route 8: from Roodebeek to Louise/Louiza
- tram route 9: from Arbre Ballon/Dikke Beuk to Simonis and Elisabeth
- tram route 10: from Hôpital Militaire/Militair Hospitaal to Churchill
- tram route 18: from Albert to Van Haelen
- tram route 19: from De Wand to Mirior/Spiegel
- tram route 25: from Boondael Gare/Boondaal Station to Rogier
- tram route 35: from Esplanade to Docks Bruxsel
- tram route 39: from Montgomery to Ban Eik
- tram route 51: from Gade du Midi/Zuidstation to Stade/Stadion
- tram route 55: from Rogier to Da Vinci
- tram route 62: from Eurocontrol to Heysel/Heizel
- tram route 81: from Marius Renard to Montgomery
- tram route 82: from Gare de Berchem/Station Berchem to Forest Centre/Vorst Centrum
- tram route 92: from Fort Jaco to Schaerbeek Gare/Schaarbeek Station
- tram route 93: from Legrand to Stade/Stadion
- tram route 97: from Wiels to Louise/Louiza
