= Anneessens-Fontainas premetro station =

Premetro station in Brussels, Belgium

Coordinates: 50.84381°N 4.34478°E

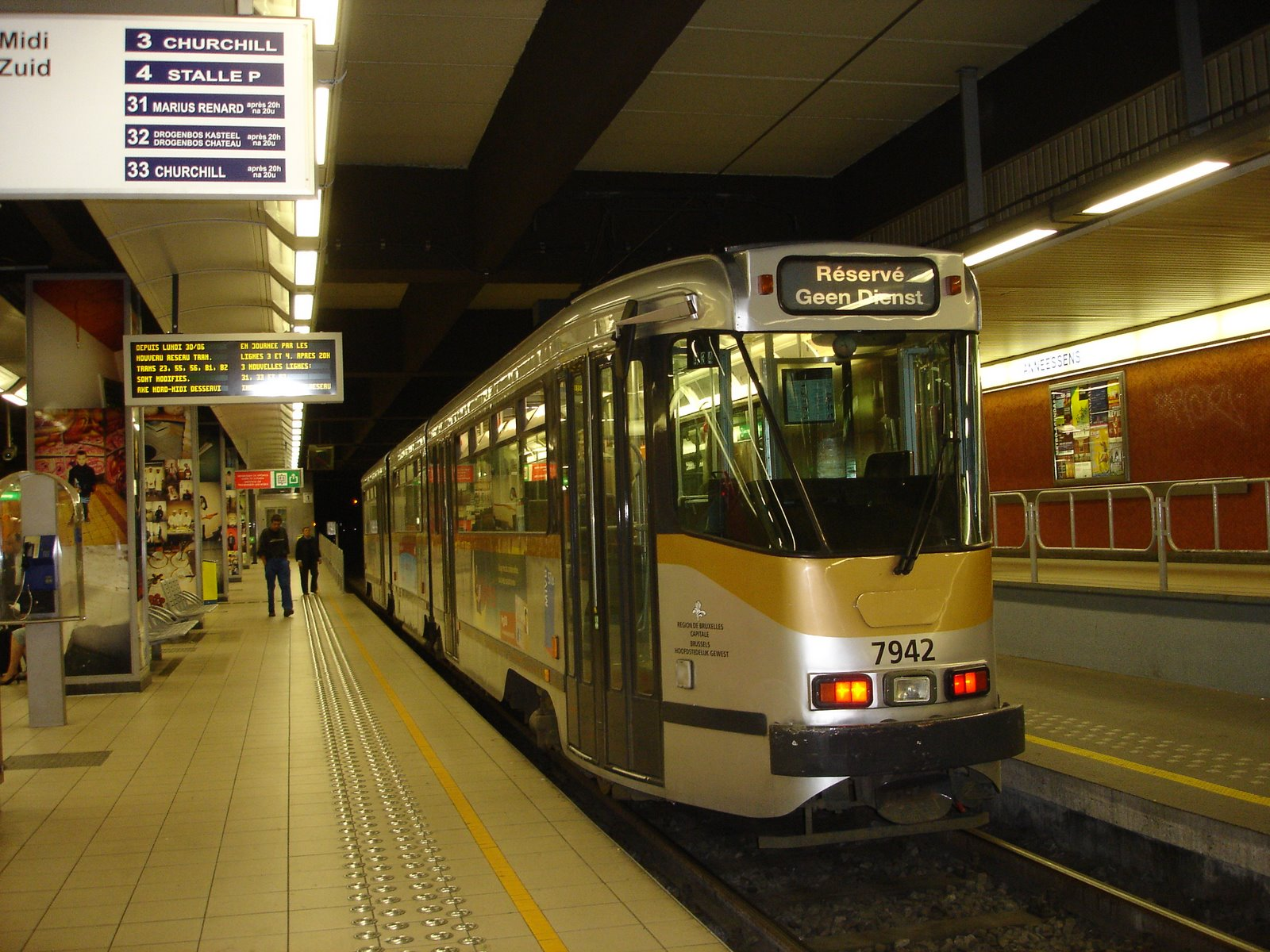
Anneessens-Fontainas premetro station

Anneessens-Fontainas is a premetro (underground tram) station in central Brussels, Belgium, located under the Place Anneessens/Anneessensplein, along the Boulevard Maurice Lemonnier/Maurice Lemonnierlaan. It is part of the North–South Axis, a tram tunnel crossing the city centre between Brussels-North railway station and Albert premetro station. Tram routes 4 and 10 stop at this station.

== See also ==
- Transport in Brussels
- History of Brussels
