= Toots Thielemans metro station =

Planned metro station in Brussels, Belgium

Toots Thielemans is a planned Brussels Metro station on line 3, between Anneessens and Gare du Midi/Zuidstation. It is named after the famous Belgian jazz musician Toots Thielemans.

It is the only new station on the first phase of line 3. There have been tunnelling difficulties, delaying the project. It will be 100 metres (330 ft) from Lemonnier, which will be rebuilt to allow tram connectivity between the South Station and the canal.
