= North–South Axis =

Tram tunnel in Brussels, Belgium

The North–South Axis is a tram tunnel in Brussels, Belgium, which crosses the city centre from north to south between Brussels-North railway station and Albert premetro station.

The first section of this tunnel was opened on 4 October 1976 between Brussels-North and Lemonnier premetro station. It was then expanded to Albert in 1993. It is currently used by tram routes 4, 10, 51 and 82. Only routes 4 and 10 use the full tunnel. Route 51 uses it between Lemonnier and Albert and route 82 between Lemonnier and Brussels-South railway station.

== Circuit and stations ==
To the north, the North–South Axis starts in the municipality of Schaerbeek near the crossroad between the Rue du Progrès/Vooruitgangstraat and the Rue Rogier/Rogierstraat. The first station in the tunnel is Brussels-North, which offers a connection with the railway station of the same name. The tunnel then crosses the municipality of Saint-Josse-ten-Noode up to Rogier where it connects with the Brussels Metro. It then enters the City of Brussels, and stops at De Brouckère (with again a connection with the metro), Bourse - Grand-Place/Beurs - Grote Markt, Anneessens-Fontainas and Lemonnier. At Lemonnier, a tunnel entry allows trams to enter or leave the tunnel at this point. The tunnel then crosses Saint-Gilles, stopping at Brussels-South railway station (where it connects with the train and the metro), at Porte de Hal/Hallepoort (where it connects with the metro), at Parvis de Saint-Gilles/Sint-Gillis Voorplein, and at Horta. At Brussels-South, another entry allows trams to leave or enter the tunnel. The last stop is Albert, and is located at the border between the municipalities of Saint-Gilles and Forest. Two different tunnel entries are then located on the Avenue Albert/Albertlaan on the Greater Ring (Brussels' second ring road) and on the Avenue Jupiter/Jupiterlaan.

== Metro line 3 ==
The North–South Axis will become an actual metro line, Metro line 3. In phase 1, the existing tram tunnel will be transformed into a metro line. Lemonnier will not be served by the metro. Instead, there will be a new metro station, "Toots Thielemans", between Brussels-South station and Anneessens. The metro line should be operational by 2025.

In phase 2 of the project, metro line 3 will be extended from Brussels-North station to Bordet railway station. Seven new stations and a depot will be built for this purpose. Construction should be completed by 2030.

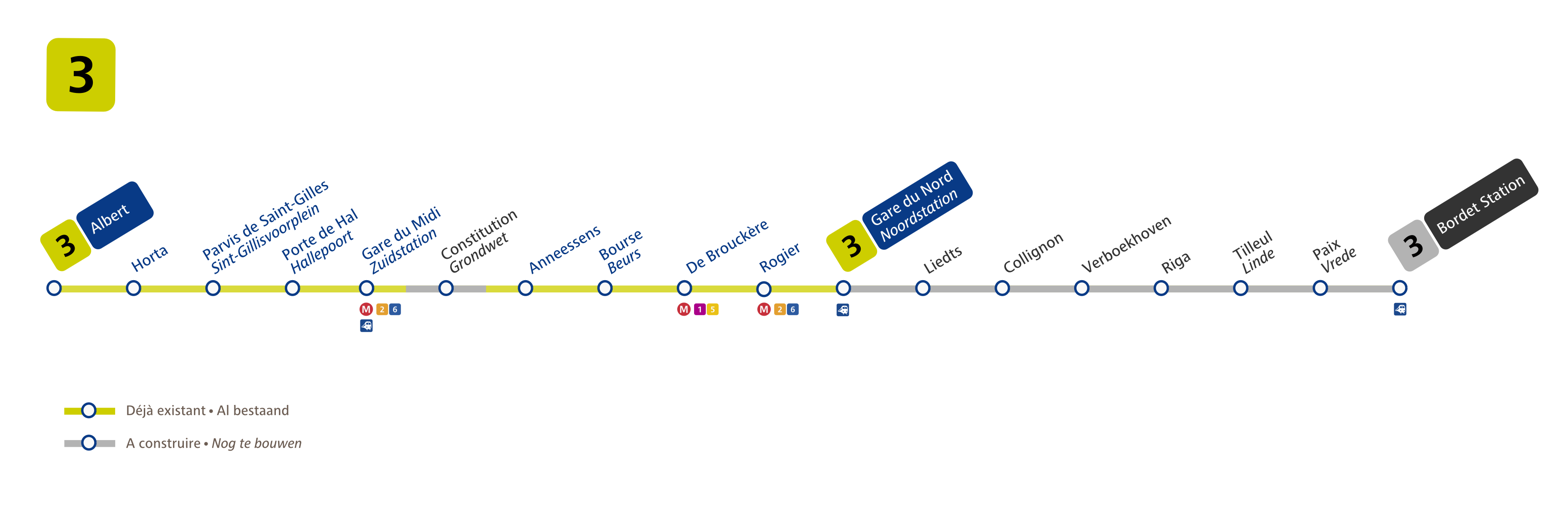
Map of future Metro line 3. The grey part has to be constructed. Station "Constitution/Grondwet" will be named "Toots Thielemans" in more recent plans.

== See also ==
- North–South Corridor (disambiguation)
- North–South line (disambiguation)
- North–South Railway (disambiguation)
