= Brussels tram route 19 =

Tram route in Brussels, Belgium

STIB/MIVB Route 19
- De Wand – Groot-Bijgaarden
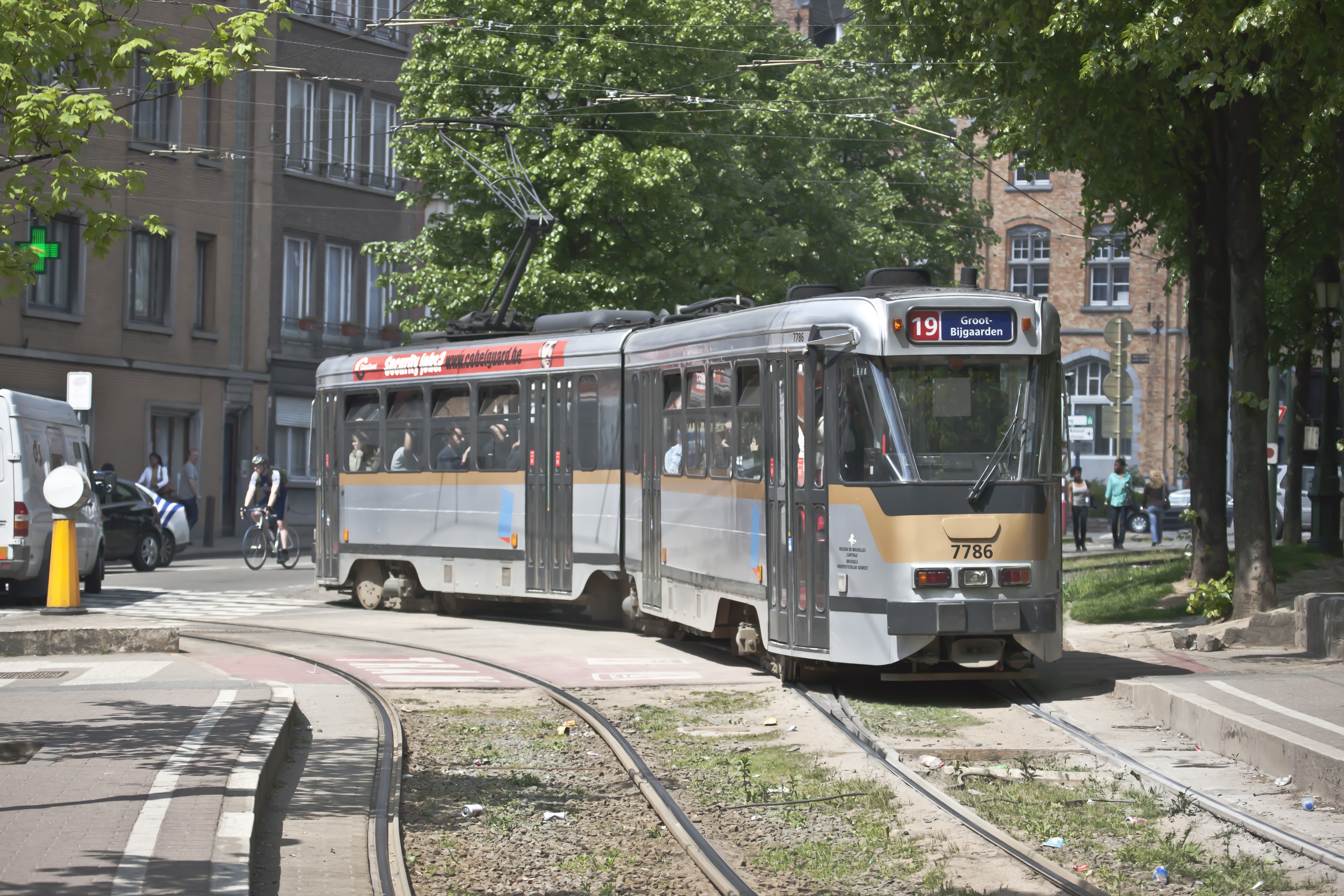
- PCC 7786 operating route 19

Overview
- System: Brussels tramway network
- Operator: STIB/MIVB
- Depot: Molenbeek-Saint-Jean
- Vehicle: PCC 7900, T3000
- Status: Operational
- Began service: 9 January 1968

Route
- Locale: Brussels, Belgium
- Communities served: City of Brussels; Jette; Koekelberg; Berchem-Sainte-Agathe; Groot-Bijgaarden
- Start: De Wand
- End: Groot-Bijgaarden
- Length: 9.18 km (5.70 mi)

Service
- Journey time: 30 minutes
Route map


The tram route 19 in Brussels, Belgium, is operated by STIB/MIVB, and connects the Flemish town of Groot-Bijgaarden in the municipality of Dilbeek to the De Wand stop in Laeken in the City of Brussels.

== Route ==
Starting from Groot-Bijgaarden railway station in Dilbeek, the route first stops at the Bayens roundabout and then enters the Brussels-Capital Region via the Brusselstraat. The first stop in Brussels is at Hunderenveld in the municipality of Berchem-Sainte-Agathe. The route then runs along the Avenue du Roi Albert/Koning Albertlaan up to the Place Docteur Schweitzer/Dokter Schweitzerplein, the Avenue Josse Goffin/Josse Goffinlaan and the Avenue de l'Hôpital Français/Frans Gasthuislaan, where it enters the municipality of Koekelberg. The route then runs alongside the Basilica of the Sacred Heart and Elisabeth Park on the Avenue du Panthéon/Pantheonlaan and then on the Avenue de la Liberté/Vrijheidslaan up to Simonis metro station. At Simonis, the route turns left on the Avenue de Jette/Jetselaan and then enters the municipality of Jette. At the Place Reine Astrid/Koningin Astridplein, the route heads towards Jette railway station via the Rue Léon Théodor/Léon Théodorstraat, then runs around Jette Cemetery via the Rue Jules Lahaye/Jules Lahayestraat and enters the Boulevard de Smet de Naeyer/De Smet de Naeyerlaan. Further on this boulevard, the route enters the borough of Laeken in the City of Brussels and then offers transit again with the Metro at Stuyvenbergh. The route finally runs along the Avenue des Robiniers/Witte Acacialaan and the Avenue Jean Sobieski/Jan Sobieskilaan and then crosses Laeken Park by entering a tunnel which ends at the other end of Laeken Park at the De Wand stop.

== See also ==
- List of Brussels tram routes
