= Brussels Metro line 3 =

Under construction metro line in Brussels, Belgium

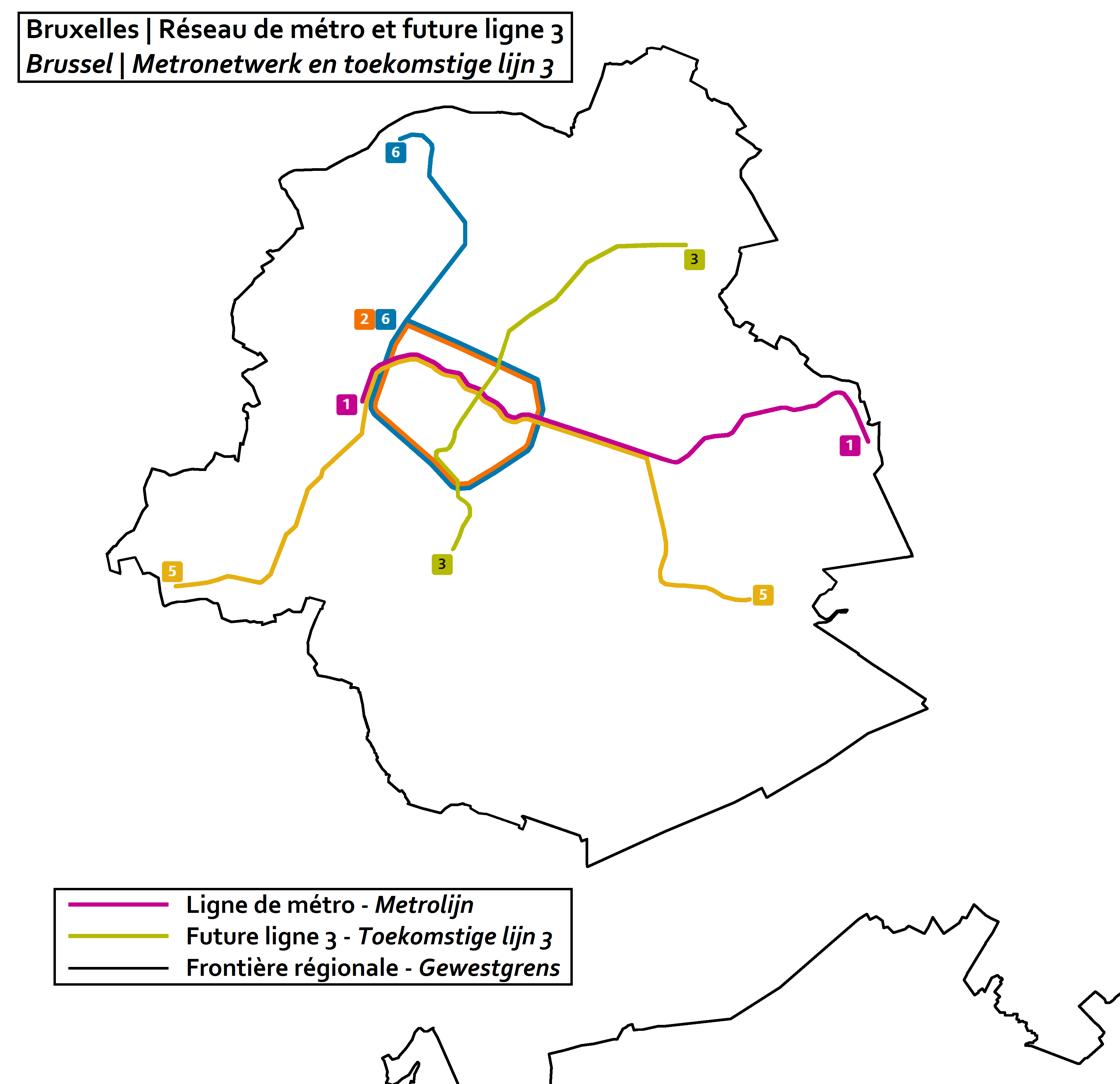
- Brussels Metro network including the future line 3

Overview
- Native name: Ligne 3 (French); Metrolijn 3 (Dutch)
- Locale: Brussels

Service
- Type: Rapid transit
- System: Brussels Metro
- Operator(s): STIB/MIVB

History
- Opened: Under construction

Line 3 is an expansion of the Brussels Metro, currently under construction as of July 2023. It will run from Albert, through the existing premetro (underground tram) tunnel, and eventually terminate at Bordet.

== History ==
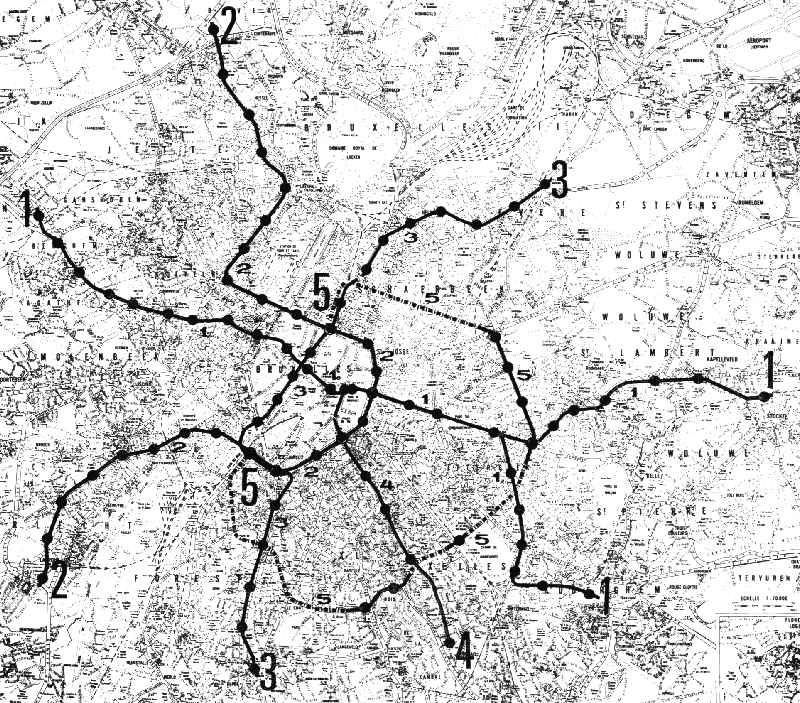
1969 plan for Brussels Metro routes

A very similar metro line was planned in 1969, but this project did not go ahead.

In 2009, STIB/MIVB's director-general Alain Flausch announced plans to develop north–south metro lines, because it was increasingly difficult to improve surface transport in dense suburbs, and said a line to Bordet had political consensus. In 2010, Beliris commissioned a study into the route, with approximately 4 km (2.5 mi) and 7 stations. The plan was approved in 2013, with construction scheduled to start in 2018 and the first metros running in 2022.

Beliris is responsible for building the northern part of the route, and STIB/MIVB is building the rest. In June 2023, Beliris asked for help from the Belgian Government, following a series of delays and cost overruns. As of December 2022, construction was expected to be complete in 2032.

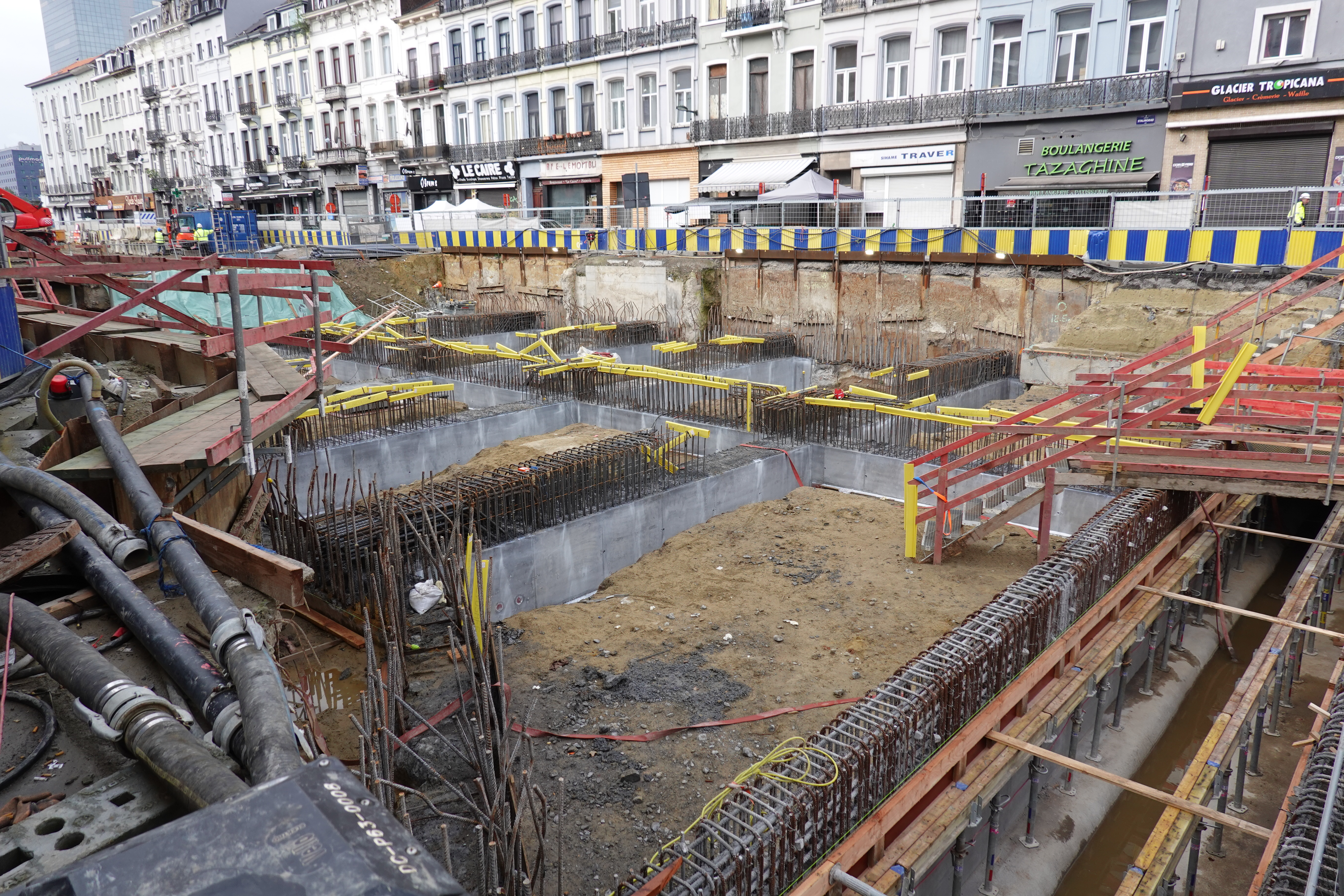
Construction of metro line 3 in the Avenue de Stalingrad / Stalingradlaan

== Route ==
The southern section of the line reuses existing premetro infrastructure, from Albert to Gare du Nord/Noordstation. North of there, new track is being built, as far as Bordet; this is expected to be complete in 2030.

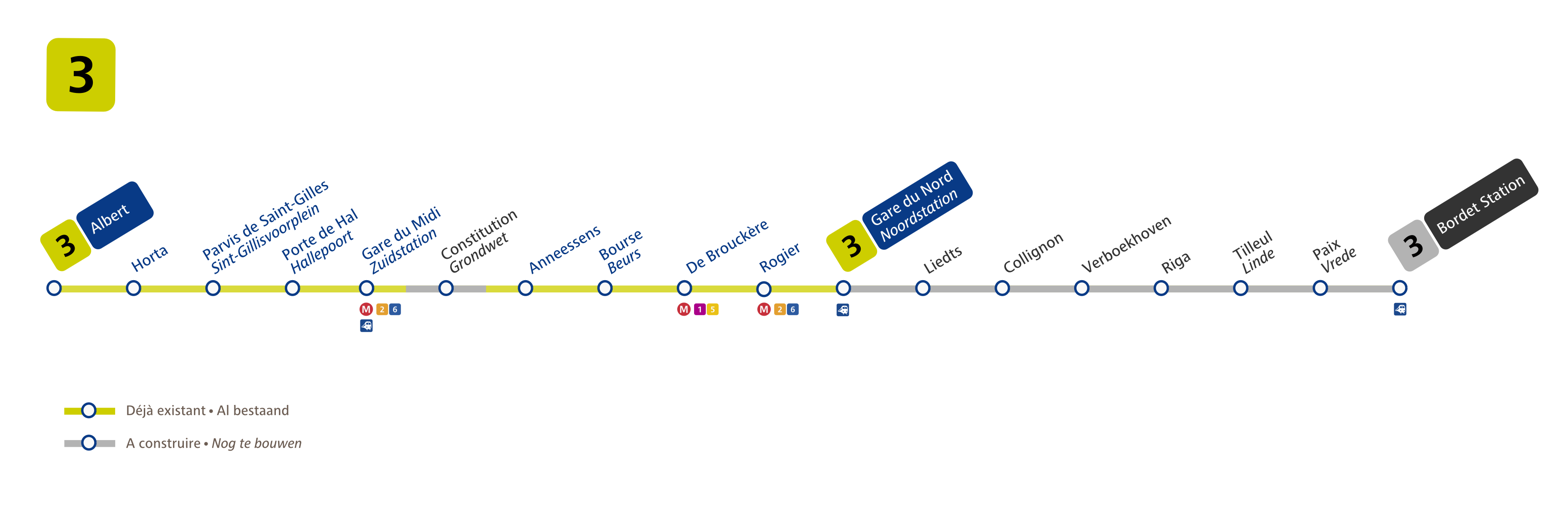

The new metro will not use the current Lemonnier station. Instead, a new station, Toots Thielemans, will be built between Gare du Midi/Zuidstation and Anneessens. Lemonnier would be rebuilt to allow tram connections, but there have been tunneling difficulties under the South Palace, and long delays.

Several other changes are needed on the premetro route. Electrification is changing 600V overhead line to 930V DC third-rail, and platforms designed for trams are changing to accommodate the new rolling stock.

Some tram routes will be reconfigured, working around the new metro services. Albert will become multimodal, with tram routes 2 and 3 terminating there.

The new metro stations in the northern section are: Bordet, Paix/Vrede, Tilleul/Linde, Riga, Verboekhoven, Colignon and Liedts.

In 2012, plans were announced to build a further line to the south, as far as Uccle; at the time, it was expected to open in 2025.

== Rolling stock ==
The metro line will use M7 trains, built by CAF.
