= Brussels tram route 4 =

Tram route in Brussels, Belgium

STIB/MIVB Route 4
- Gare du Nord/Noordstation – Stalle Parking

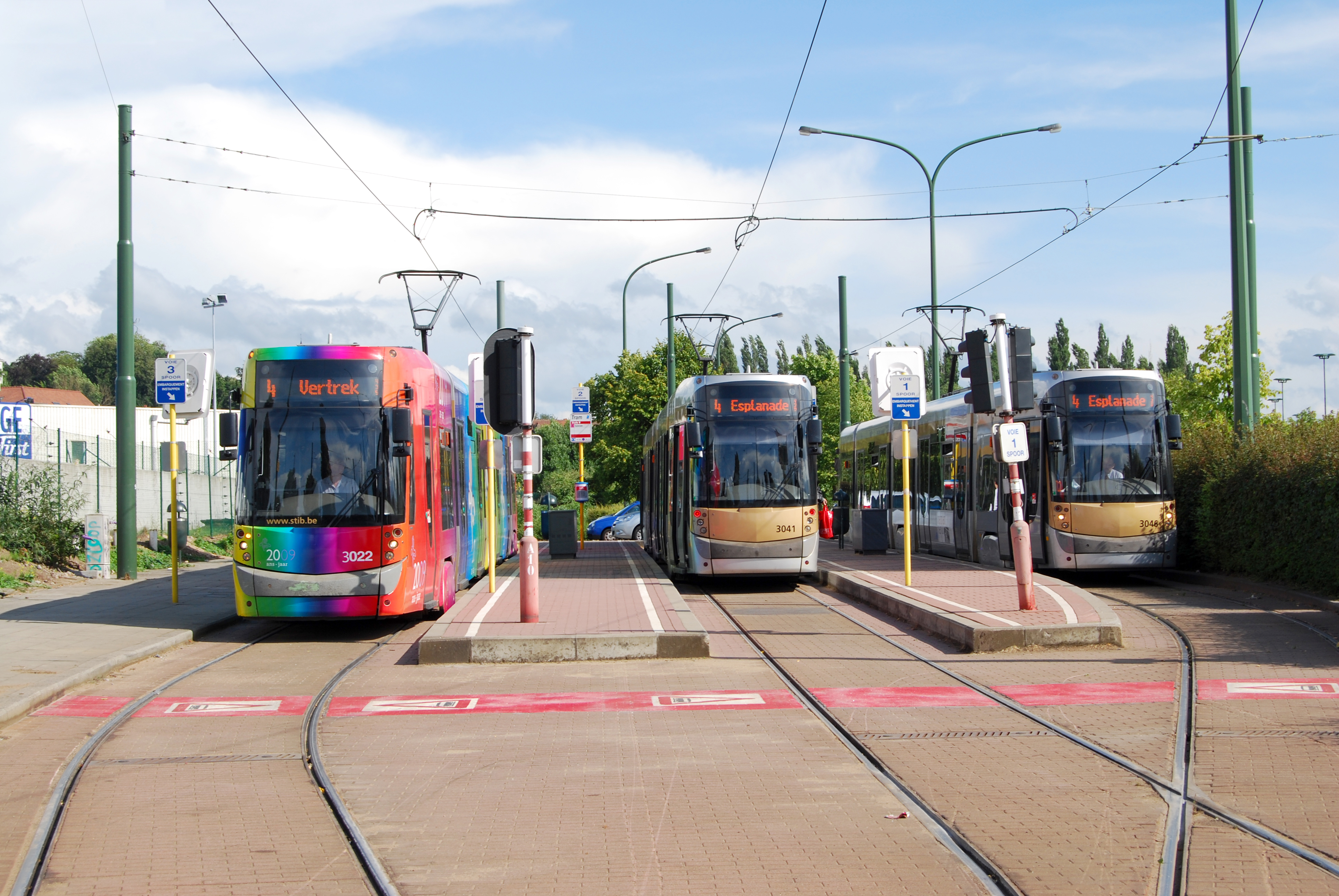
- Trams at the Stalle Parking terminus

Overview
- System: Brussels tramway network
- Operator: STIB/MIVB
- Depot: Haren, Ixelles, Schaerbeek
- Vehicle: T3000, T4000
- Status: Operational
- Began service: 2 July 2007

Route
- Locale: Brussels, Belgium
- Communities served: Schaerbeek; City of Brussels; Saint-Gilles; Forest; Uccle
- Start: Gare du Nord/Noordstation
- Via: North–South Axis
- End: Stalle Parking
- Length: 10.0 km (6.2 mi)

Service
- Journey time: 35 minutes
Route map


The premetro and tram route 4 in Brussels, Belgium, is operated by STIB/MIVB, and connects the Stalle Parking stop in the southern municipality of Uccle to Brussels-North railway station in the municipality of Schaerbeek. It was created on 2 July 2007 as a new route between Esplanade and Stalle Parking. On 31 August 2009, the route was shortened with a new terminus at Brussels-North, while line 3 was expanded between Brussels-North and Esplanade. The colour of the signage for this line is pink.

Following the disbandment of line 3 in 2024, only tram lines 4 and 10 remain in the North–South Axis that runs underneath the Pentagon (Brussels' city centre). Both lines 4 and 10 have a 6-minute schedule during rush hour and are serviced by the modern low-floor trams (Bombardier T3000 and T4000).

== History ==
The line was created on 2 July 2007, replacing tram route 52 between Esplanade and Brussels-North railway station and tram route 91 between Stalle Parking and Vanderkindere. Together with tram routes 3, 7, 8 and 9, it is one of five 'chrono' lines, which means that it is served by low-floor high-capacity trams with a high frequency. The low line number chosen for the new line shows that it is either a metro line or a 'chrono' line.

From 31 August 2009, lines 3 and 4 changed their northern termini. Line 4 was shortened to terminate at Brussels-North, with the route between Brussels-North and Esplanade operated by line 3. Because of this, the very long line 4 and the short line 3 were then equalised. Line 3 was disbanded in 2024 and replaced by the new line 10.

Originally, the shorter line 4 did not run after 8 p.m. because tram route 33 had been extended to Stalle Parking. From September 2011, route 33 was suspended, replaced between Brussels-North and Bordet railway station by an extension of tram route 32 from Brussels-North to Da Vinci. At this time, evening running of line 4 was restored.

== Route ==
The route crosses the North–South Axis from Brussels-North to Albert. The tunnel crosses the municipalities of Schaerbeek, Saint-Josse-ten-Noode, City of Brussels, Anderlecht, Saint-Gilles and Forest. It then rides along the Avenue Albert/Albertlaan, which is a part of the Greater Ring, up to the Vanderkindere crossroad in Uccle. There, the route uses the Avenue Brugmann/Brugmannlaan, which then becomes the Rue de Stalle/Stallestraat. At the end of that street lies the tram terminus next to Stalle Parking.

== See also ==
- List of Brussels tram routes
