= Albert premetro station =

Premetro station in Brussels, Belgium

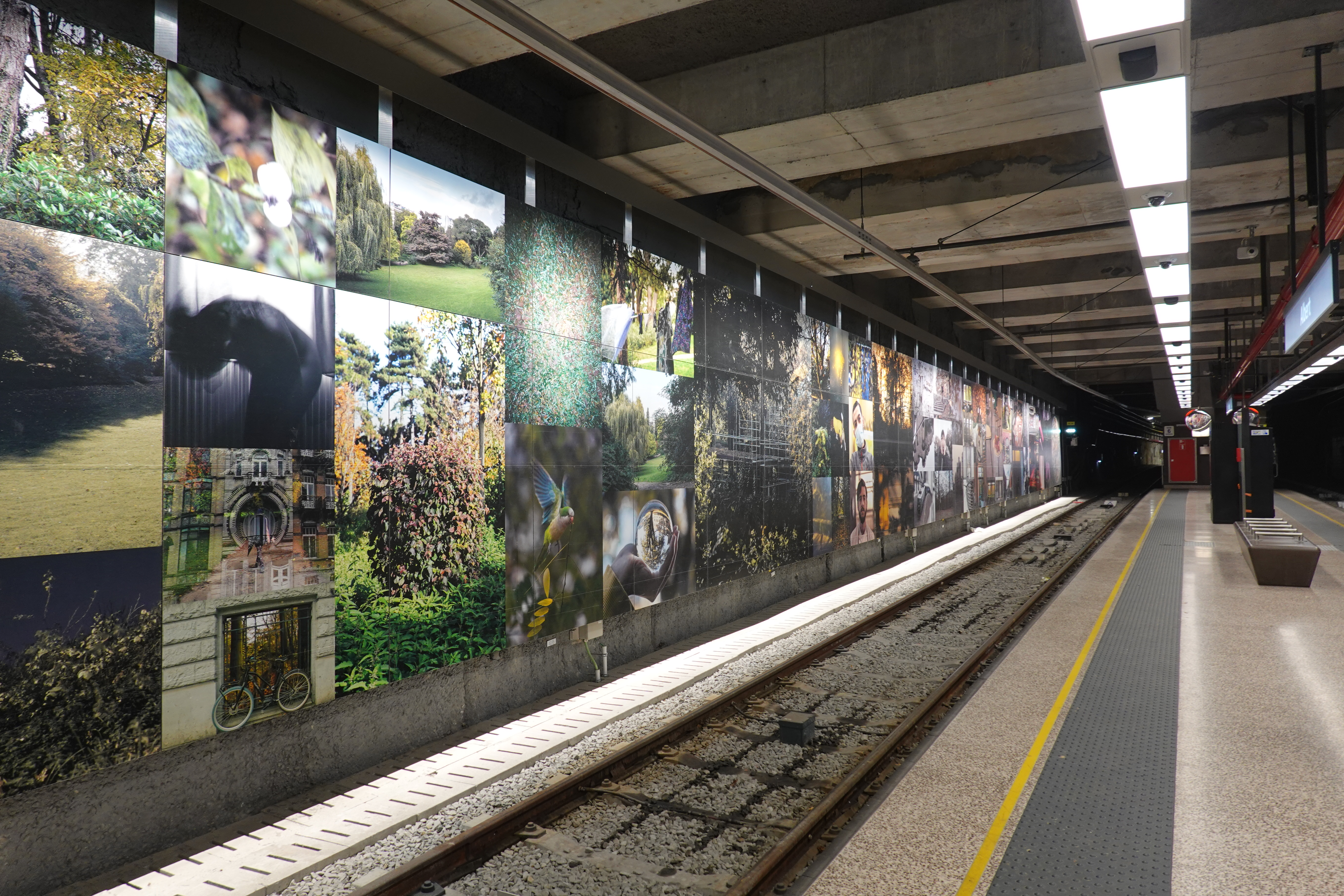
- Albert premetro station

General information
- Coordinates: 50.82139°N 4.34194°E
- System: Premetro station
- Owner: STIB/MIVB

Construction
- Structure type: Underground
Location

Albert (French pronunciation: [albɛʁ]; Dutch pronunciation: [ˈɑlbərt]) is a premetro (underground tram) station located on the border between the municipalities of Saint-Gilles and Forest in Brussels, Belgium. The station is at the crossroad between the Avenue Albert/Albertlaan on the Greater Ring and the Chaussée d'Alsemberg/Alsembergsesteenweg, between Forest Park and Saint-Gilles Prison.

The station is the last stop south of the North–South Axis, a tram tunnel crossing the city centre from Albert to Brussels-North railway station. Tram routes 4 and 10 stop at this station. There is also a connection at ground level with tram route 51, as well as bus routes 48 and 54.

As line 3 of the Brussels Metro is built, Albert station will be reconfigured; tram routes 2 and 3 will terminate there.

== See also ==
- Transport in Brussels
- History of Brussels
