= Brussels tram route 10 =

Tram line in Brussels, Belgium

STIB/MIVB Route 10
- Hôpital Militaire/Militair Hospitaal - Churchill

Overview
- System: Brussels tramway network
- Operator: STIB/MIVB
- Vehicle: T4000
- Status: Operational
- Began service: 23 September 2024

Route
- Locale: Brussels, Belgium
- Communities served: City of Brussels, Schaerbeek, Saint-Josse-ten-Noode, Saint-Gilles, Forest, Uccle
- Start: Hôpital Militaire/Militair Hospitaal
- Via: North–South Axis
- End: Churchill
- Length: 5.5 km (3.4 mi)

The premetro and tram route 10 in Brussels, Belgium, is operated by STIB/MIVB, and connects the Hôpital Militaire/Militair Hospitaal stop in Neder-Over-Heembeek in the City of Brussels to the Churchill stop in the southern municipality of Uccle. It began service on 23 September 2024, taking over most of the route of line 3, which was disbanded that day.

== See also ==
- List of Brussels tram routes
