= Saint-Gilles, Belgium =

Municipality of the Brussels-Capital Region, Belgium

Saint-Gilles: Sint-Gillis (Dutch)
- Municipality
- Saint-Gilles' Municipal Hall seen from the Place Maurice Van Meenen/Maurice Van Meenenplein

- Flag Coat of arms

- Saint-Gilles municipality in the Brussels-Capital Region
- Interactive map of Saint-Gilles
- Location in Belgium
- Coordinates: 50°49′37.139″N 04°20′39.269″E
- Country: Belgium
- Community: Flemish Community; French Community
- Region: Brussels-Capital
- Arrondissement: Brussels-Capital

Government
  - Mayor: Jean Spinette (PS)
  - Governing parties: LB, Ecolo-Groen

Area
  - Total: 2.53 km^{2} (0.98 sq mi)

Population (2020-01-01)
  - Total: 49,678
  - Density: 19,600/km^{2} (50,900/sq mi)
- Postal codes: 1060
- NIS code: 21013
- Area codes: 02
- Website: stgilles.brussels (in French) stgillis.brussels (in Dutch)

Saint-Gilles (French, pronounced [sɛ̃ ʒil]) or Sint-Gillis (Dutch, pronounced [sɪntˈxɪlɪs]) is one of the 19 municipalities of the Brussels-Capital Region, Belgium. Located in the southern part of the region, it is bordered by the City of Brussels, Anderlecht, Forest and Ixelles. Like all municipalities in Brussels, it is officially bilingual (French–Dutch).

Saint-Gilles has a multicultural identity stemming from its diverse population. The housing stock varies from semi-derelict tenements near Brussels-South railway station in the north, to elegant bourgeois houses on the southern borders with Uccle and Ixelles, to tourist hotels at the inner end of the Chaussée de Charleroi/Charleroisesteenweg.

== History ==
=== Beginnings as Obbrussel ===
The first houses of the hamlet of Obbrussel (Old Dutch: Obbrusselsche, meaning "Upper Brussels") were built, between the 7th and the 11th centuries, close to the Altitude Cent/Hoogte Honderd, one of the highest points in Brussels, now part of Forest. In 1216, following strong demographic growth in the area, Forest Abbey allowed Obbrussel to become an independent parish. This independence, however, was to last only eighty years, after which the administration of the village was given to Brussels. By the 16th century, Obbrussel had grown to 41 houses.

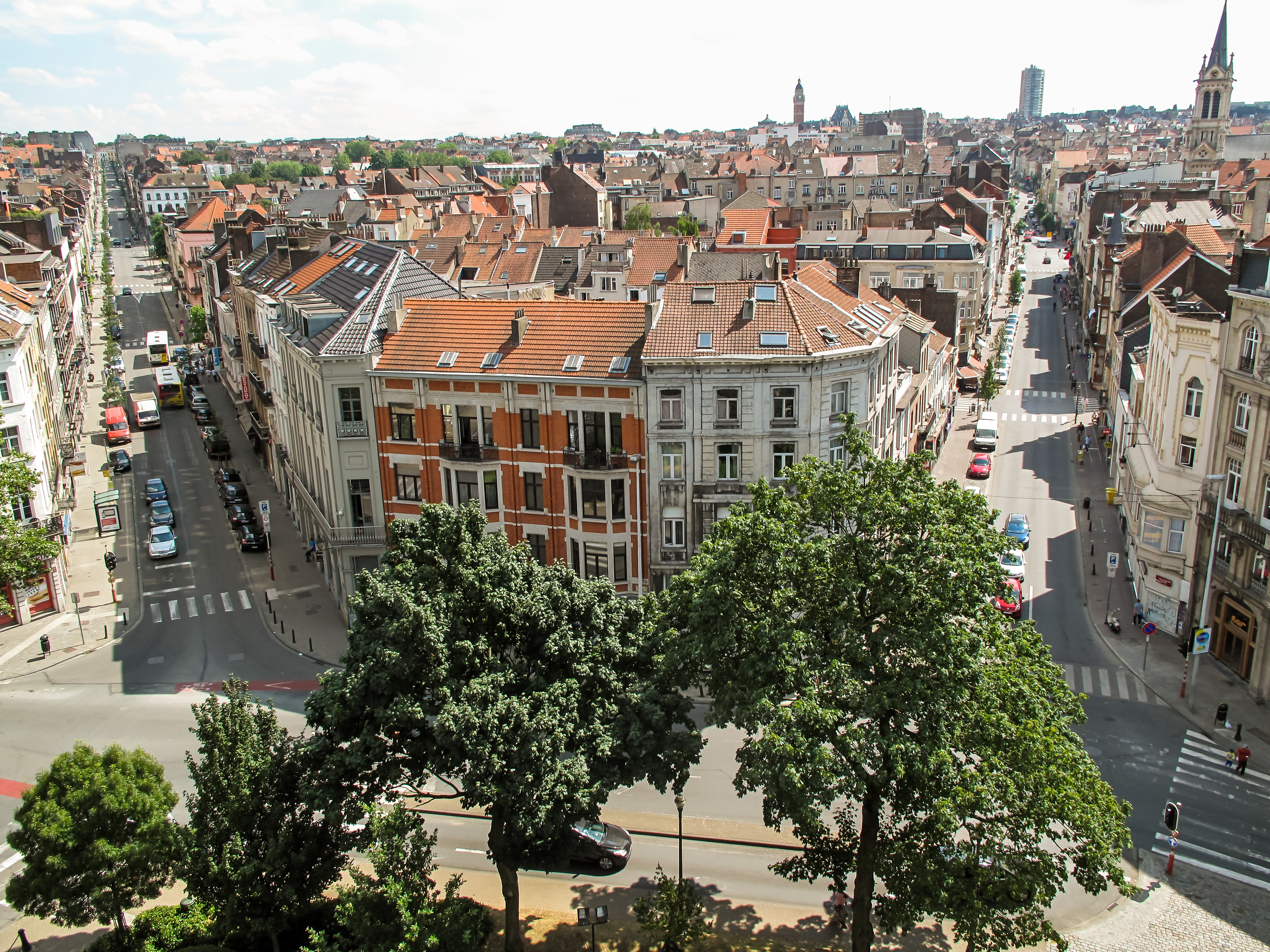
Start of the Chaussée de Waterloo / Waterloosesteenweg (on the right) from the Halle Gate

In 1670, following orders from the Spanish government, the Count of Monterey built a fort in Obbrussel as part of the fortifications of Brussels to protect the City of Brussels against possible attacks. Erected in 1675, this fort was dismantled in the following century to give way to several important toll roads and urban development. The name of the Barrière de Saint-Gilles/Bareel van Sint-Gillis neighbourhood (lit. 'Barrier of Saint Giles') still commemorates those tolls to this day.

=== French regime until today ===
During the French regime, on 31 August 1795, the village, by now called Saint-Gilles after its patron saint and main church, merged with neighbouring villages to form Uccle. Four years later, it gained its independence again, with its own mayor and municipal council. In 1830, Brussels became the capital of newly founded Belgium. As a result, the rural village of Saint-Gilles, known for centuries for its cabbage cultivation, went through an unprecedented construction spree. The population increased from 2,500 around 1800 to more than 33,000 in 1880 to a peak of 60,000 in 1910.

The street pattern was completely remodelled in the 1860s by the architect and urbanist Victor Besme. It was around that time that the Avenue Louise/Louizalaan, Brussels-South railway station, and the new Church of St. Gilles were built, to be followed soon after by Saint-Gilles Prison and Municipal Hall. Nowadays, Saint-Gilles is one of the densest municipalities of the Brussels agglomeration.

== Sights ==
- The upper part of the municipality is dotted with a dozen or more Art Nouveau houses designed by masters such as Victor Horta and Paul Hankar. Horta's own house, now the Horta Museum, is located there, on the Rue Américaine/Amerikaansestraat. Several of those houses have been recognised as World Heritage Sites by UNESCO in 2000.
- The imposing Municipal Hall, built between 1900 and 1904, looks larger than it is, and bears a resemblance to a French château with Venetian overtones.
- The extant neo-Gothic prison and the demolished Hôtel des Monnaies/Munthof (former home of the Royal Mint of Belgium) both date from the 1880s, while the Church of St. Gilles was built in 1867.
- There is not a lot of open space in the municipality, although Forest Park abuts its western side.
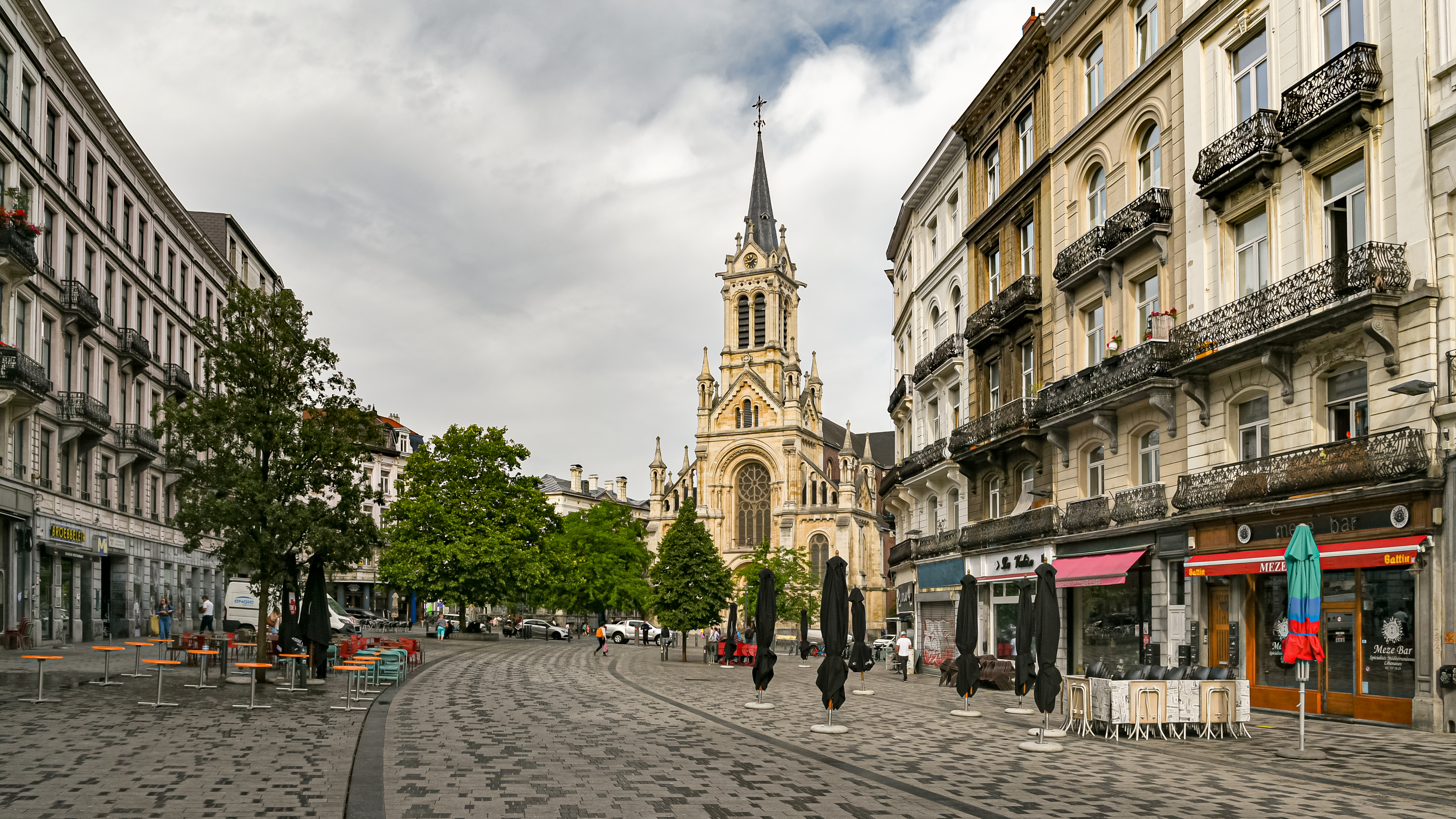
View of the Parvis de Saint-Gilles/Sint-Gillisvoorplein towards the Church of St. Gilles

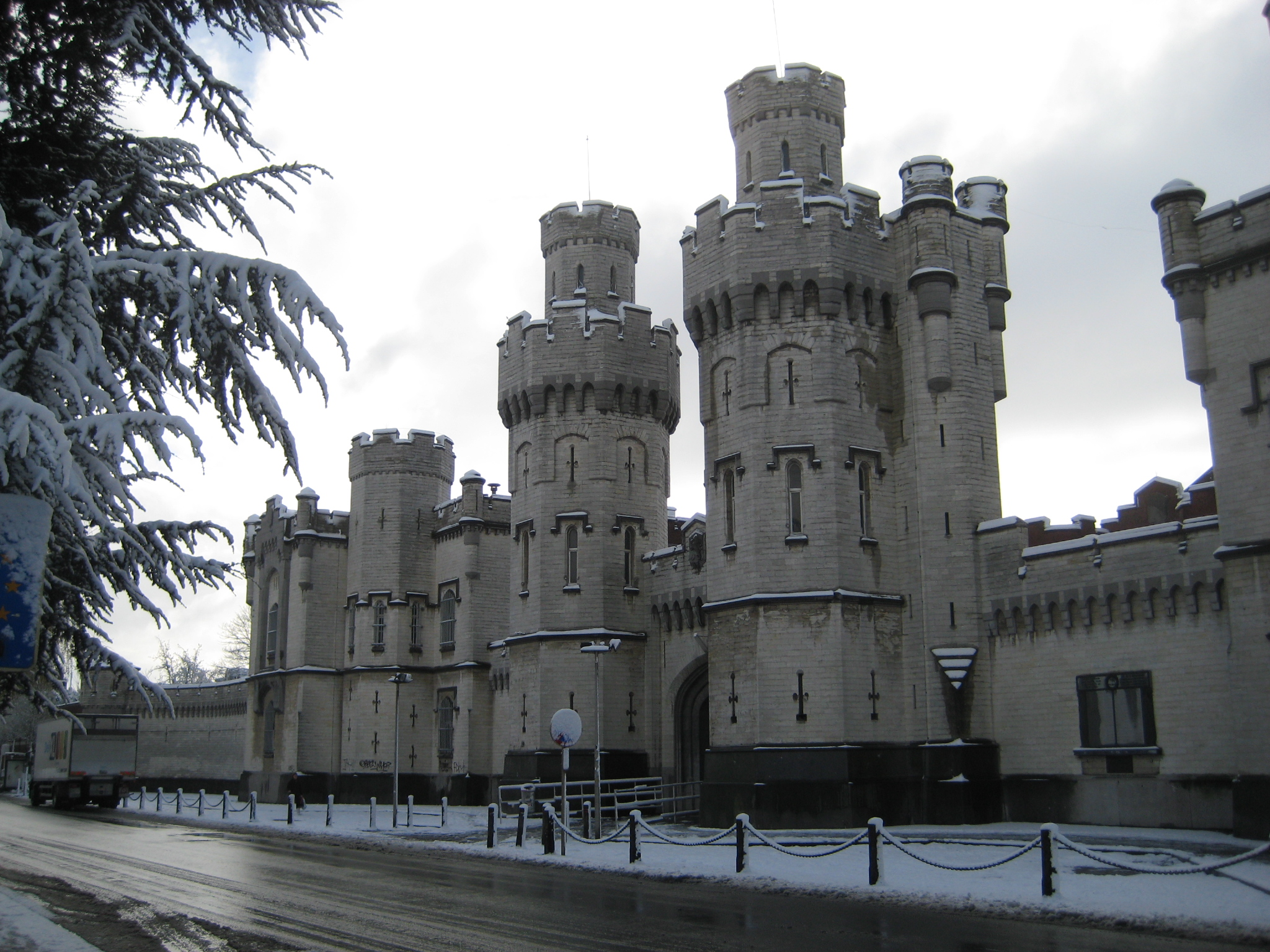
Front entrance to Saint-Gilles Prison

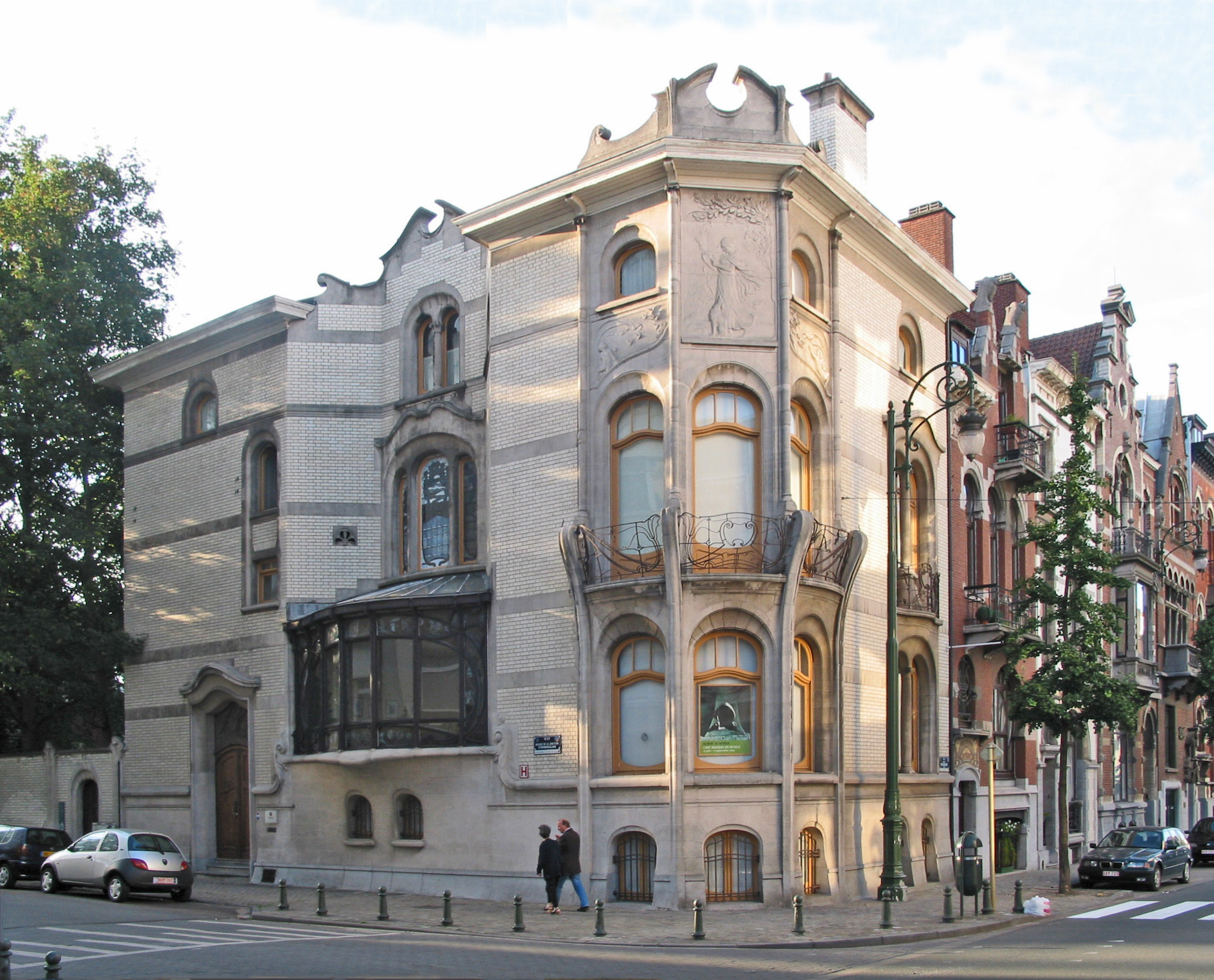
The Hôtel Hannon, an Art Nouveau house designed by Jules Brunfaut

== Statistics ==
=== Population ===
- Nationality: Saint-Gilles has one of the highest foreign populations of any Brussels municipality. Of the 48,827 registered residents in January 2025, 24,120 (49.4%) do not hold Belgian nationality. The largest foreign communities are those from France (c. 5,600), Portugal (c. 2,300), Italy (c. 2,100) and Spain (c. 1,800), Morocco (c. 1,400), Romania (c. 1,400), Poland (c. 1,100), Germany (c. 600), Greece and Brazil (c. 500).
- Age: The population is relatively young—the average age is 38.1 years—with nearly 8,000 residents under 18 years old, and fewer than average over 65.
- Sex: Saint-Gilles has an equal split of men (24,414, 50%) and women (24,413, 50%).
- Income: The average income per inhabitant is around €17,100 per year, making it below the national average.

=== Economy and labour market ===
- Businesses: In 2024, the municipality was home to 5,073 head offices of VAT-registered businesses and 1,636 local operating units.
- Employment: 35,177 employees and 4,442 self-employed people worked there. Saint-Gilles has a high female labour market participation rate; 59.8% against 68.2% for men. The employment rate was 60.8%. Unemployment stood at 16.4%, having fallen from 24.2% in 2015.
- Tourism: Hotel nights have reached over 750,000 per year, of which international tourists represent roughly 77%. Saint-Gilles maintains the second-largest hotel capacity in the Brussels-Capital Region.
- Property prices: The median sale price of an apartment in Saint-Gilles reached €280,000, while terraced houses reached a median price of €580,000. Around 550 properties change hands annually.
- Rents: Most accommodation in the municipality is rented (around 70%). The average rent across all private market housing types is approximately €850 to €950 per month. There were 1,180 social housing units managed within the municipality.

== Politics ==
The current city council was elected in the October 2024 elections. The current mayor is Jean Spinette, a member of PS.

== Education ==
The municipality has 14 nursery and primary schools (11 French-speaking and 3 Dutch-speaking) and 7 secondary schools (6 French-speaking and 1 Dutch-speaking).

The Faculty of Architecture, Architectural Engineering and Urban Planning of the University of Louvain (UCLouvain) is established in Saint-Gilles.

== Transport ==
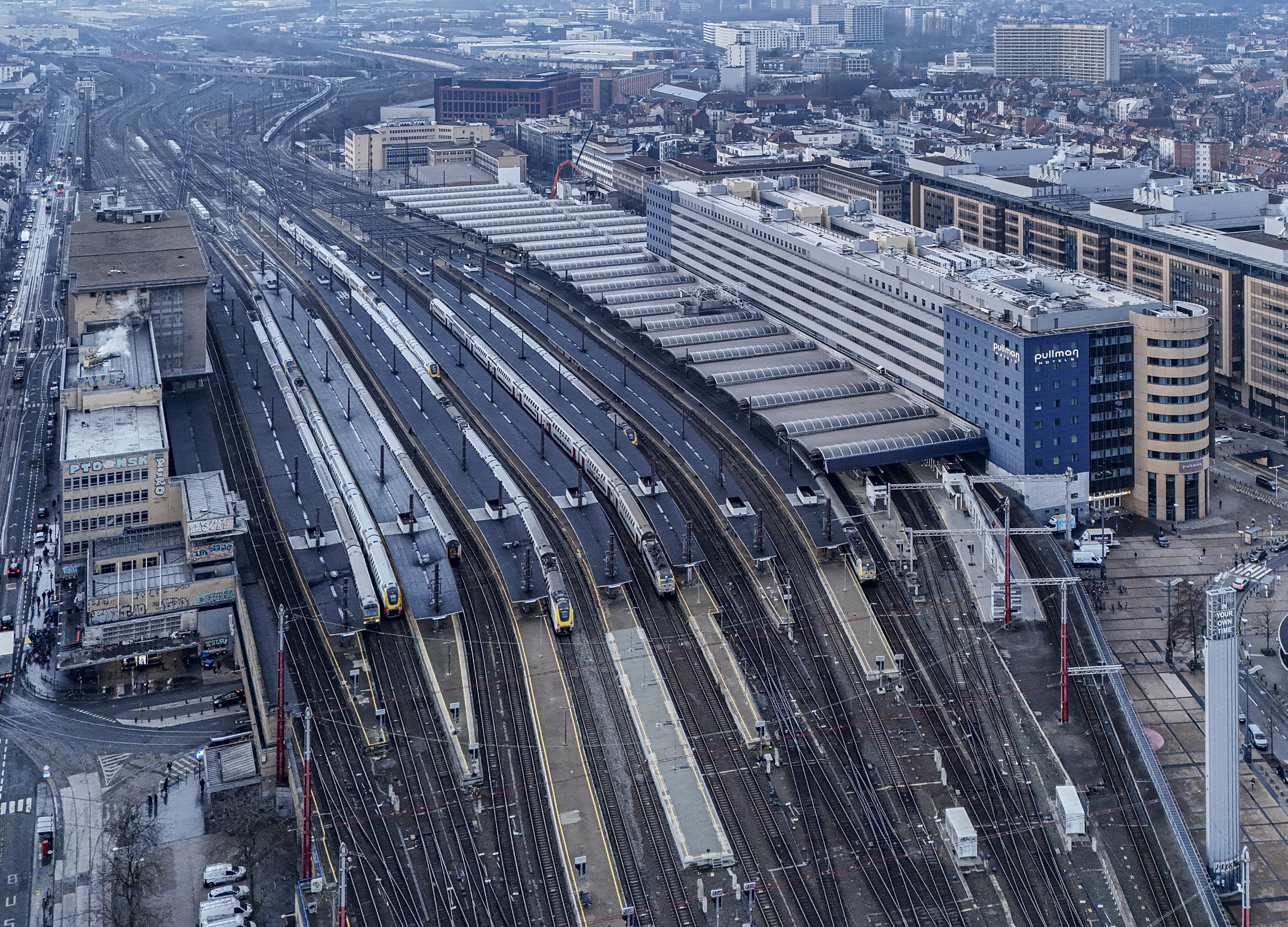
Aerial view of Brussels-South railway station in 2026

Saint-Gilles's dense population is well served by public transport. Brussels-South railway station, which is the busiest train station in Belgium and has multiple international high-speed connections, sits at the northern tip of the municipal territory, and the underground premetro (underground tram) line passes southwards through it. The project to convert it to heavy metro line 3 has been suspended following tunnelling problems. It would have run from Albert northwards to Gare du Nord/Noordstation (Brussels-North Station), later to be extended to Bordet. Additionally, a comprehensive bus and tram service links Saint-Gilles to other parts of the region. The municipality also has a number Villo! public bicycle stations on its territory.

== Sports ==
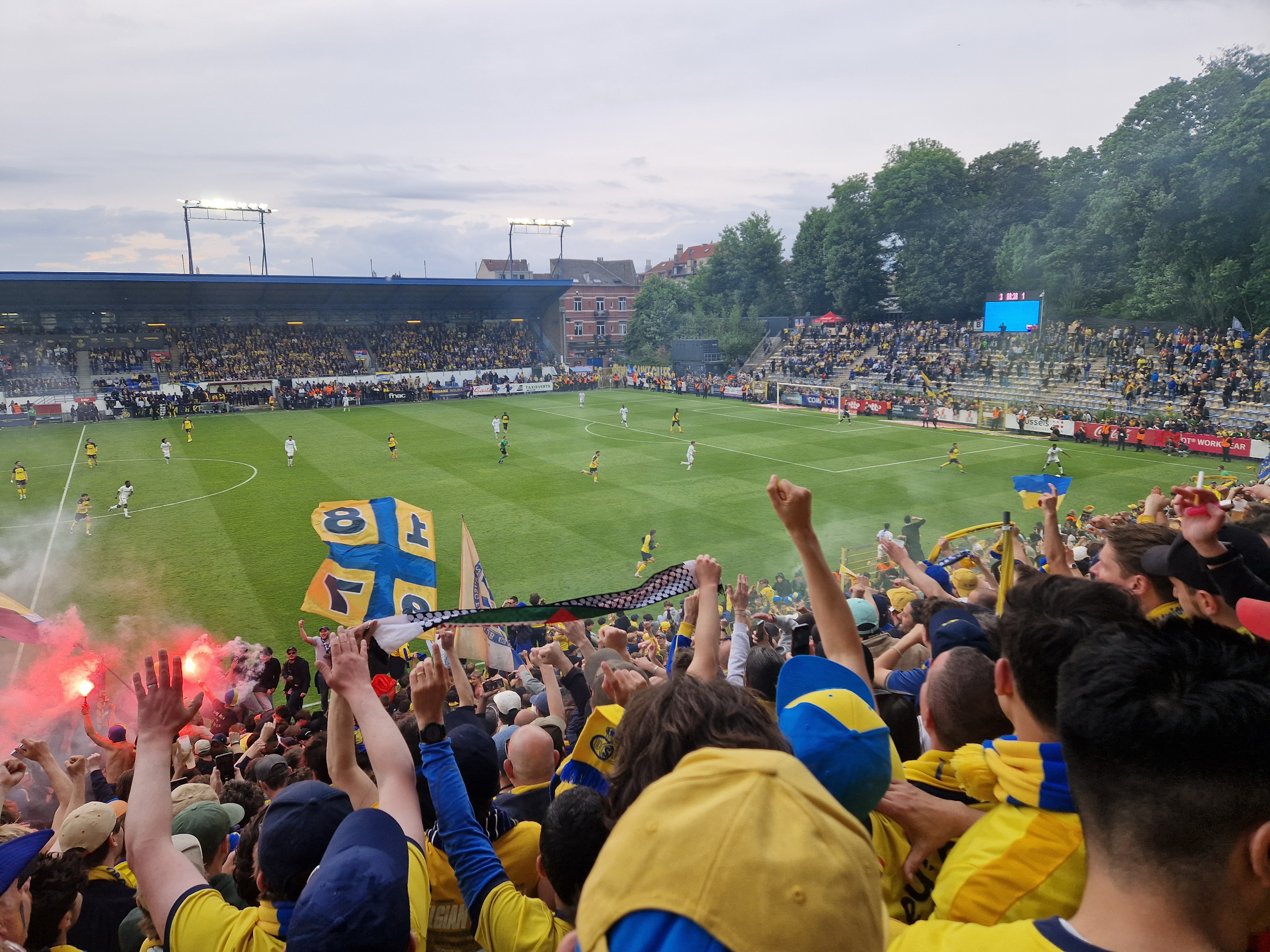
Royale Union Saint-Gilloise home game against KAA Gent, May 2025

Saint-Gilles has a football club called Royale Union Saint-Gilloise, which had its prime years in the 1930s. On 13 March 2021, after defeating local rivals R.W.D. Molenbeek, Union was promoted back to the Belgian First Division A, marking its first appearance in top-flight football in 48 years. In May 2025, Union won the Belgian League title for the first time in 90 years. Its home ground is the Joseph Marien Stadium, located in Duden Park in Forest.

== Notable inhabitants ==
- Paul Delvaux (1897–1994), surrealist painter
- Victor Horta (1861–1947), Art Nouveau architect
- Jef Lambeaux (1852–1908), sculptor
- Alme Meyvis (1877–1932), landscape painter
- Pierre Paulus (1881–1959), expressionist painter
- Théodore Pilette (1883–1921), racing driver
- Rob Redding (b. 1976), American abstract painter and media proprietor
- Paul-Henri Spaak (1899–1972), politician, statesman, Prime Minister, Secretary General of NATO, and one of the Founding fathers of the European Union
