= Pentagon (Brussels) =

Historical city centre of Brussels, Belgium

Pentagon: Pentagone (French); Vijfhoek (Dutch)
- Neighbourhood
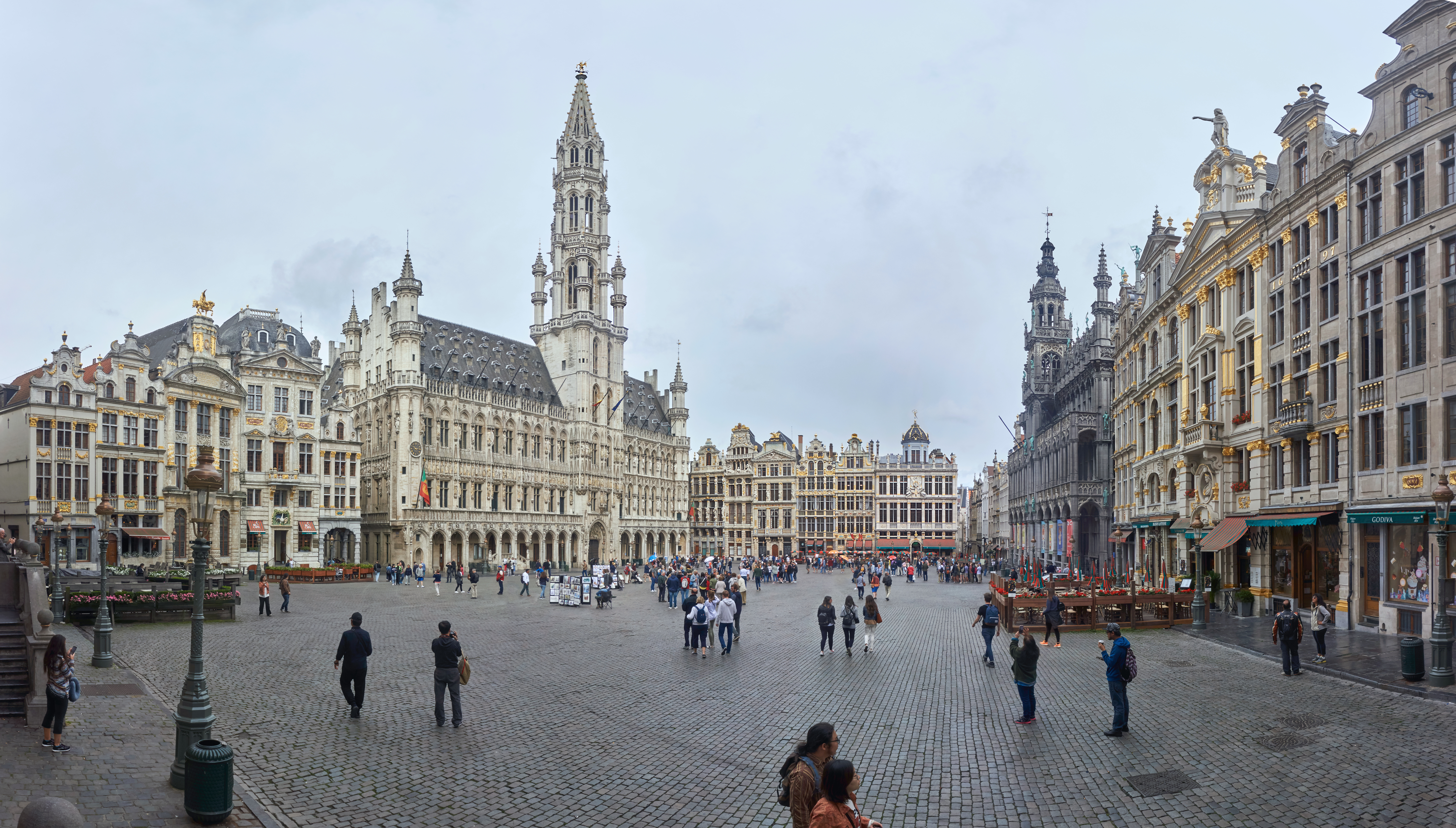
- The Grand-Place/Grote Markt

- Location within Brussels Pentagon (Belgium)
- Coordinates: 50°50′48″N 4°21′9″E
- Country: Belgium
- Region: Brussels-Capital Region
- Arrondissement: Brussels-Capital
- Municipality: City of Brussels
- Named for: Pentagon

Area
  - Total: 4.61 km^{2} (1.78 sq mi)
- Time zone: UTC+1 (CET)
  - Summer (DST): UTC+2 (CEST)
- Postal code: 1000
- Area codes: 02
- Website: Official website

The Pentagon (French: Pentagone, pronounced [pɛ̃taɡɔn]; Dutch: Vijfhoek, pronounced [ˈvɛifɦuk]) or Brussels' city centre is the historical city centre of Brussels, Belgium, within the contours of the Small Ring inner ring road. The Small Ring is located on the site of the second walls of Brussels, which were built in the 16th century. As in most European cities, these walls were replaced by large boulevards at the end of the 19th century.

The Pentagon, within the Small Ring, covers 4.61 km^{2} (1.78 sq mi) and is more or less pentagonal or heart-shaped, hence its name. In 2013, 51,566 people lived there, mainly in the Marolles/Marollen district and west of the central boulevards. For the entire City of Brussels, there were 168,576 inhabitants; the majority living outside the Pentagon, in the northern part of the municipality.

== Neighbourhoods ==
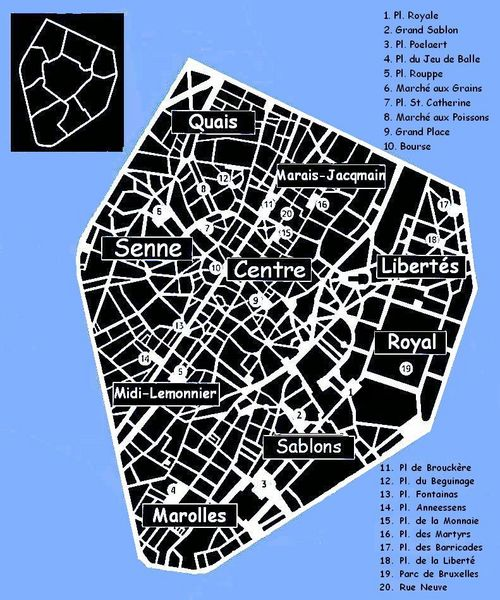
Map of Brussels' Pentagon and its districts (in French)

Neighbourhoods in the Pentagon include:

- Central Quarter
- Royal Quarter
- Marolles/Marollen
- Sablon/Zavel
- Midi–Lemonnier Quarter
- Senne Quarter
- Quays Quarter
- Marais–Jacqmain Quarter
- Freedom Quarter
