= Brussels tram route 81 =

Tram route in Brussels, Belgium

STIB/MIVB Route 81
- Montgomery – Marius Renard
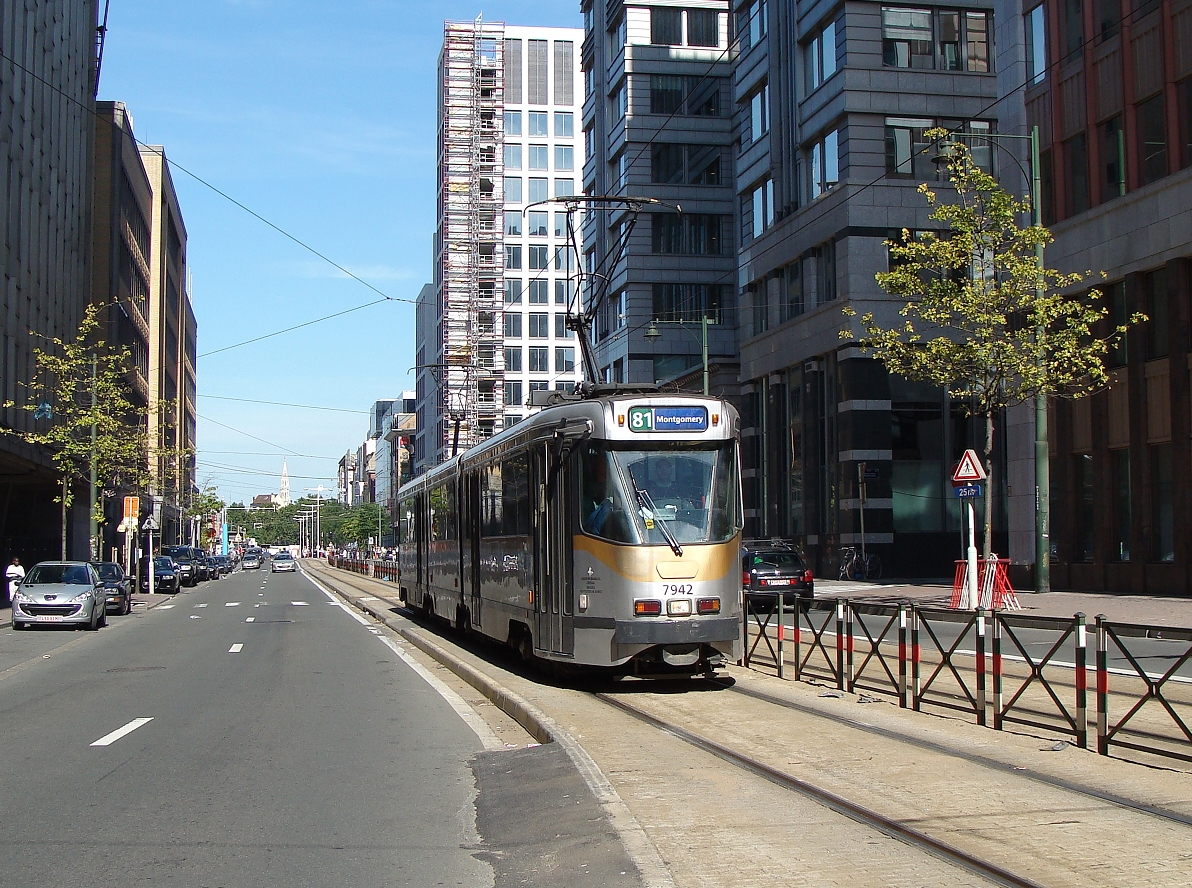
- PCC 7942 on the Avenue Fonsny/Fonsnylaan

Overview
- System: Brussels tramway network
- Operator: STIB/MIVB
- Depot: Saint-Gilles, Woluwe-Saint-Pierre
- Vehicle: PCC 7700/7800; PCC 7900
- Status: Operational
- Began service: 1 May 1914

Route
- Locale: Brussels, Belgium
- Communities served: Woluwe-Saint-Pierre; Etterbeek; Ixelles; City of Brussels; Saint-Gilles; Anderlecht
- Start: Montgomery
- End: Marius Renard
- Length: 13.8 km (8.6 mi)

Service
- Journey time: 55 minutes
Route map


The tram route 81 in Brussels, Belgium, is operated by STIB/MIVB, and connects the Marius Renard stop in the municipality of Anderlecht to the multimodal Montgomery metro station in Woluwe-Saint-Pierre. The route also crosses the municipalities of Saint-Gilles, Ixelles, the City of Brussels and Etterbeek. It offers transit with the Metro at Saint-Guidon/Sint Guido, Brussels-South (also railway), Merode (also railway) and Montgomery. The route also crosses the major tram routes 3 and 4 at Horta. A good deal of its length is in carriageway, while long sections at either end are in reservation. It has a short section in tunnel at Brussels-South.

== History ==
The route was changed in the 2000s, with the section west from Brussels-South railway station going to Marius Renard rather than Heysel/Heizel metro station.

Until 2018, the route was served by PCC trams – first 7700-series and later the longer 7900s. In that year, the stops at Bailli/Baljuw were moved from the central reservation of the Avenue Louise/Louizalaan into the Rue du Bailli/Baljuwstraat, which has permitted the longer Flexity low-floor trams to be used when these are not needed elsewhere, that is normally at weekends. This progression to high-capacity vehicles accompanies an improvement in service frequency, with the daytime headway now being 7^{1}/_{2} minutes.

== Route ==
Montgomery - Merode - Place St Pierre/Sint-Pietersplein - Acacias/Acacia - La Chasse/De Jacht - Église Saint-Antoine/Sint-Antoonkerk - Germoir/Mouterij - Levure/Gist - Flagey - Dautzenberg - Bailli/Baljuw - Trinité/Drievuldigheid - Janson - Moris - Lombardie/Lombardije - Barrière/Bareel - Guillaume Tell/Willem Tell - Bethléem/Bethlehem - Avenue du Roi/Koningslaan - Suède/Zweden - Gare du Midi/Zuidstation - Bara - Conseil/Raad - Albert I - Curegham/Kuregem - Douvres/Dover - Résistance/Verzet - Saint-Guidon/Sint-Guido - Meir - Ysaye - Van Beethoven - Frans Hals - Parc Vivès/Vivèspark - Marius Renard.

== See also ==
- List of Brussels tram routes
