= Trams in Brussels =

Tram network in Brussels, Belgium

Brussels tramway network

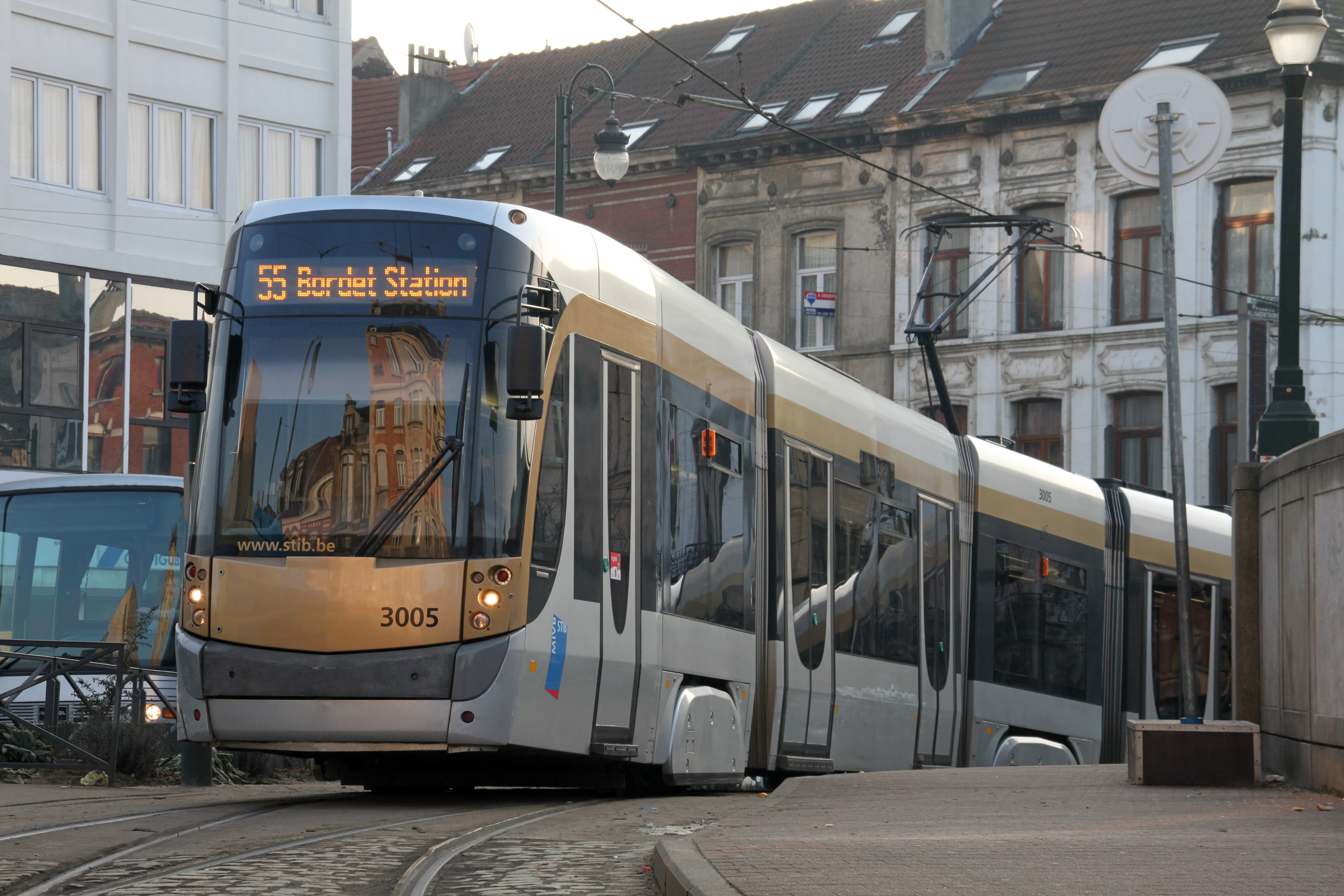
- A Bombardier T3000 in Brussels, 2010

Operation
- Locale: Brussels, Belgium
- Routes: 18 (2019)
- Owner: Brussels-Capital Region
- Operator: STIB/MIVB

Infrastructure
- Track gauge: 1,435 mm (4 ft 8 1/2 in) standard gauge
- Propulsion system: Electricity
- Electrification: 750 V DC overhead lines
- Depot: 7
- Stock: 397

Statistics
- Track length (total): 140.6 km
- Route length: 141.1 km (87.7 mi)
- 2017: 149.1 million
Horsecar era: 1869–c. 1900
- Status: Converted to electricity
- Track gauge: 1,435 mm (4 ft 8 1/2 in)
- Propulsion system: Horses
Steam tram era: 1876–1877, 1879
- Status: Experiments abandoned
- Track gauge: 1,435 mm (4 ft 8 1/2 in)
- Propulsion system: Steam
Accumulator tram era: 1883, 1886–1889
- Status: Experiments abandoned
- Track gauge: 1,435 mm (4 ft 8 1/2 in)
- Propulsion system: Rechargeable batteries
Electric tram era: since 1894
- Status: Still running
- Owner: Brussels-Capital Region
- Operators: STIB/MIVB (since 1954)
Overview
- Website: www.stib-mivb.be/home

The Brussels tramway network is a tram system serving a large part of the Brussels-Capital Region of Belgium. It is the 16th largest tram system in the world by route length, in 2017 providing 149.1 million journeys (up 9.5% on 2016) over routes 140.6 km (87.4 mi) in length. In 2018, it consisted of 18 tram lines (eight of which—lines 4, 7, 10, 25, 32, 51, 55 and 82—qualified as premetro lines, and five of which—lines 4, 7, 8, 9 and 10—qualified as "Chrono" or "Fast" lines). Brussels trams are operated by STIB/MIVB, the local public transport company.

The network's development has faced issues including the inconsistent route pattern resulting from the closure of the interurban trams, the conflict between low-floor surface trams and high-floor underground trams, and whether the trams run on the right or the left.

== History ==
=== Before the First World War ===
Belgium's first horse-drawn trams were introduced in Brussels in 1869, running from the Namur Gate to the Bois de la Cambre/Ter Kamerenbos. In 1877, a steam tram was introduced but it was not powerful enough for the hilly terrain and the tests were stopped. Simultaneously the Tramways Bruxellois experimented with a locomotive built in Tubize, but it did not work either. The components proved too fragile and this experiment was also discontinued. In 1887, experiments were made with accumulator trams, but these had a very limited range. Trolley power, used in Liège, was also tried in Brussels and in 1894 Brussels' first electric tram lines were laid from the Place Stéphanie/Stefanieplein to Uccle.

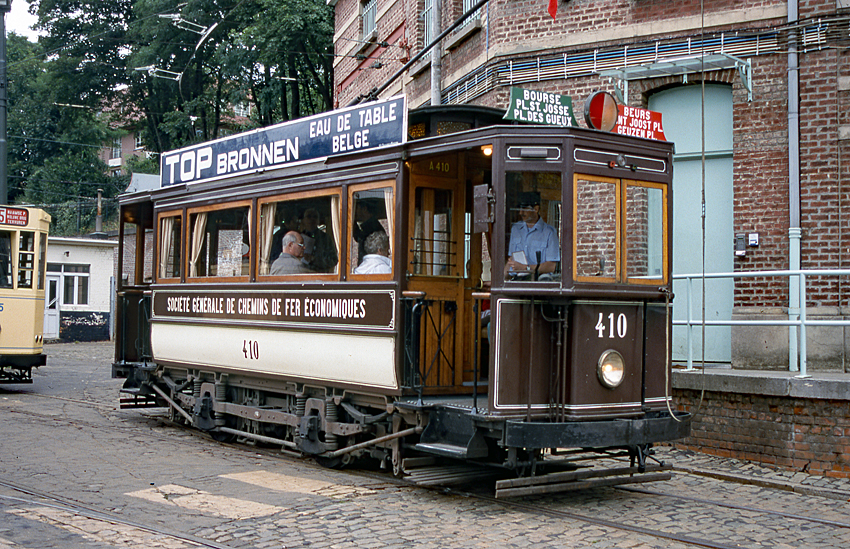
CFE tram 410 of 1903 at the Tram Museum (MTUB) Woluwe depot

Several companies built their own tram lines until the turn of the century, the most important being Les Tramways Bruxellois (TB): founded on 23 December 1874 on the merger of the Belgian Street Railways and Omnibus Company Limited led by Albert Vaucamp and the Société des Voies ferrées Belges led by William Morris (Morris & Sheldon Company). The TB started with five horse tramlines: Schaerbeek–Room Forest (Morris), Uccle–Place Stephanie (Morris), Place Liedts–Saint-Gilles (Vaucamp), Laeken–South (Vaucamp), and Laeken–Anderlecht (Vaucamp). Another was Société générale des Chemins de Fer Économiques (CFE), popularly known as the chocolate trams because of their colour: known before 1880 as Compagnie Générale de Tramways. The CFE electrified its lines from 1904 onwards. These lines had the Bourse Palace as their central hub.

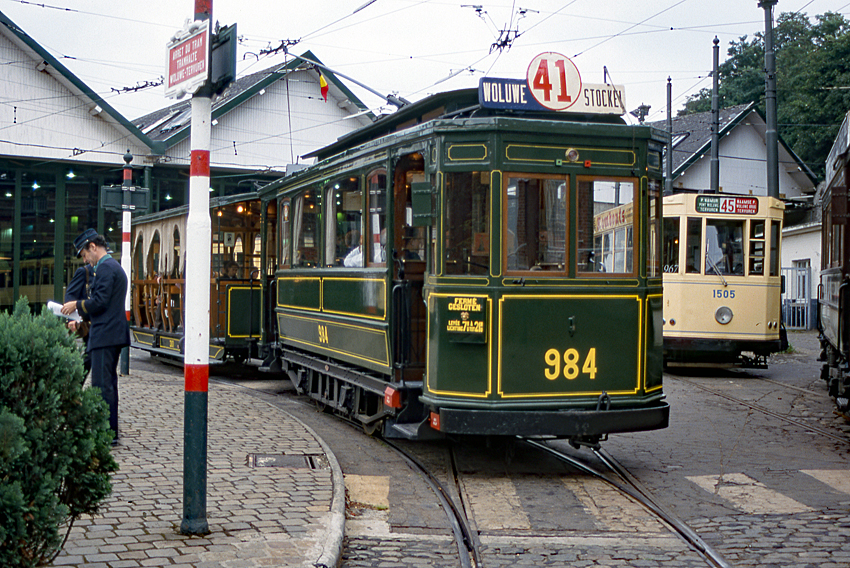
TB tram 984 and trailer 301 at MTUB Woluwe

In addition, there were smaller companies: Tramways de Bruxelles à Evere et Extensions: founded in 1883, and Chemin de Fer à Voie Etroite de Bruxelles à Ixelles-Boondael (BIB): founded in 1884, and taken over by the TB on 28 April 1899. These last two companies used 1,000 mm (3 ft 3 3/8 in) metre gauge track and started with steam traction instead of with horse trams. In 1899, the TB was granted a 45-year concession on condition that the whole network was electrified, a condition that was met in the following years. Until the First World War, many investments were made in the network, such as heavier rails and more powerful trams. The vicinal/buurtspoor networks set up city services.

=== After the First World War ===
Tram services were not restored to normality until 1925. During the war, there was poor maintenance, many horses were requisitioned and tram equipment was used for military purposes. On 1 January 1928, the TB and CFE networks merged, leaving only the TB and the vicinal/buurtspoor network in operation. The CFE was known for its 'chocolate bars' so named because of their dark brown livery; several examples can still be admired in the Brussels Tram Museum. The CFE personnel also wore brown uniforms. In 1928, the CFE lines were renumbered within the TB system. In 1935, the Brussels tram network was 240 km (150 mi) long, making it one of the largest tram networks in Europe. There were almost 100 tram lines, including many direct connections between the various boroughs. For the Brussels International Exposition of 1935, the famous '5000-series' trams, the first in Brussels with two bogies, were put into service.

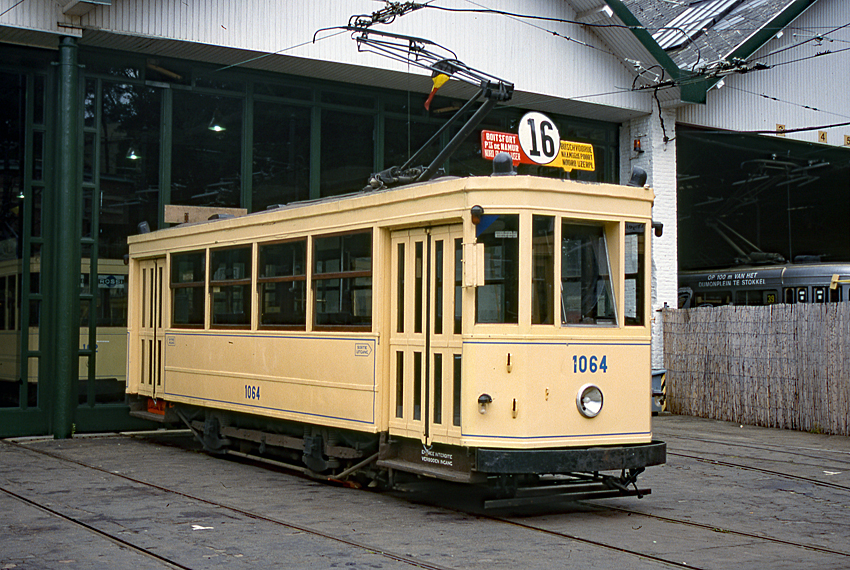
1064 ATB Standard tram, built 1934, at MTUB Woluwe

Because the TB concession expired on 31 December 1945, an agreement was concluded between the State and the Province of Brabant to continue the operation of the Brussels trams. A provisional management committee was set up, which functioned until the foundation, on 1 January 1954, of the Brussels Intercommunal Transport Company (STIB/MIVB). Great efforts were made to catch up on overdue maintenance and 787 motor trams were modernised to the Brussels standard type. The electro-pneumatic brake was introduced in these cars and the conductor and driver (called Wattman in Belgium) had permanent seats.

Growing traffic congestion led to plans to build reserved tracks for trams, and in the city centre to put them in tunnel. In 1957, the first tunnel was opened near the congested Place de la Constitution/Grondwetplein, between Brussels-South railway station and Lemonnier. From 1969, trams were adapted to run in tunnel, using block signalling.

In addition to the major refurbishment of the standard cars, STIB/MIVB had a great need for modern equipment to serve the 1958 Brussels World's Fair (Expo 58), to which its organisers wished to provide public transport access from the whole city. To this end, large turning loops for hundreds of trams were laid out in the exhibition grounds. In 1952, the PCC car entered Brussels with motor car 7001, the start of a series of 172 cars. Over the years, many series of single-ended versions (7500 and 7700 series, 128 car) and double-ended versions (7900 series, 61 cars) followed. Eventually, the PCC car entirely replaced motor car and trailer combinations.

The development of the premetro, a tram-unfriendly policy and a constant shortage of funds led to a deterioration of the Brussels tram system well into the 1990s, with many routes being replaced by metro lines or converted to bus routes. Only with investment in new equipment (the T2000 tram) and the upgrading and improvement of the tram network did the balance turn positive.

== Intermodal integration ==
The system exists in a somewhat unusual local government context, because Brussels is a self-governing region, as an enclave within Flanders, although only some 3.3 km (2.1 mi) from Wallonia at the closest point. This means that three-way deals are necessary between Brussels' own STIB/MIVB, Flanders' De Lijn and Wallonia's TEC.

STIB/MIVB sees itself as a provider of mobility rather than just public transport, and has a 49% share in the Cambio carsharing franchise. The Brussels conurbation—19 municipalities plus adjoining commuter belt—is also served by a fairly dense network of main-line trains. The MOBIB contactless smart card can be used on buses, trams, the metro and for mainline railway season tickets, and is gradually being extended to other modes, although it is not yet accepted for single journeys by De Lijn. A simple tariff system permits unlimited changes with a one-hour period for €2.50 when bought from the driver, €2.10 from a ticket machine. Real-time arrival indicators have been installed at almost all tram stops. On 1 July 2020, contactless payment by debit card, credit card, smartphone or smartwatch was introduced.

The rate of detected fare-dodging is 4.15%, despite periodic enforcement campaigns, and this is being addressed by the installation of ticket barriers in all metro stations. From 2013, the obligation to check out of as well as into the system is being progressively introduced.

== Routes ==
=== Development of the network ===
As of 2017, there are 17 tram routes, totalling 141.1 km (87.7 mi), and serving most parts of the city, including three partial ring routes (7, 8, and 81). The routes have a very varied feel, including street running through narrow streets in working-class districts (line 81), cobbled central reservation, reserved track through parkland and woods (line 44), signal-controlled running in tunnels (the premetro lines 3 and 4 in the North–South Axis, and 7), and short stretches in cutting (the old route 18, closed in 2007). Almost all trams are double-ended and all are double-sided, and there is a fairly even mixture of stub and loop termini. The route pattern shows some notable gaps, particularly along major radial routes, because these were originally served by the national network of buurtspoorwegen/tramways vicinaux. These used 1,000 mm (3 ft 3 3/8 in) metre gauge, rather than the Brussels 1,435 mm (4 ft 8 1/2 in) standard gauge, and so the tracks could not easily be taken over when the lines were progressively closed from the 1960s onwards.

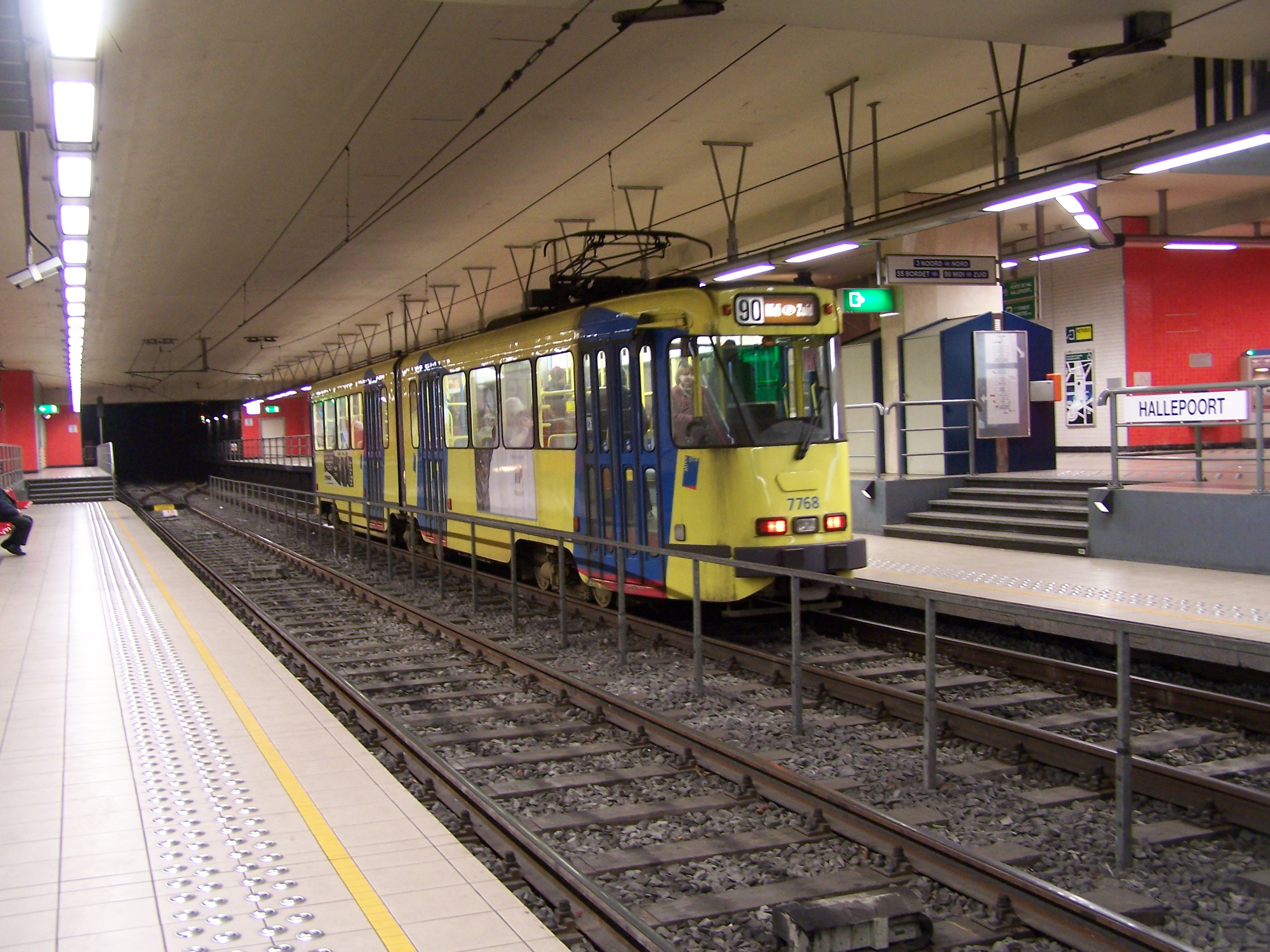
A tram at Porte de Hal/Hallepoort premetro station

The complementary routing of vicinal and urban tracks and the replacement of key lines by metro has led to some peculiar track layouts, for instance at the Barrière de Saint-Gilles/Bareel Sint-Gillis. Though all seven roads at this circular junction originally had tram lines, only three of the original seven remain. To negotiate a sharp turn, the old route T18 (closed 1 July 2007) had to make a 270-degree turn on its journey away from the city centre, looping round and crossing its own path.

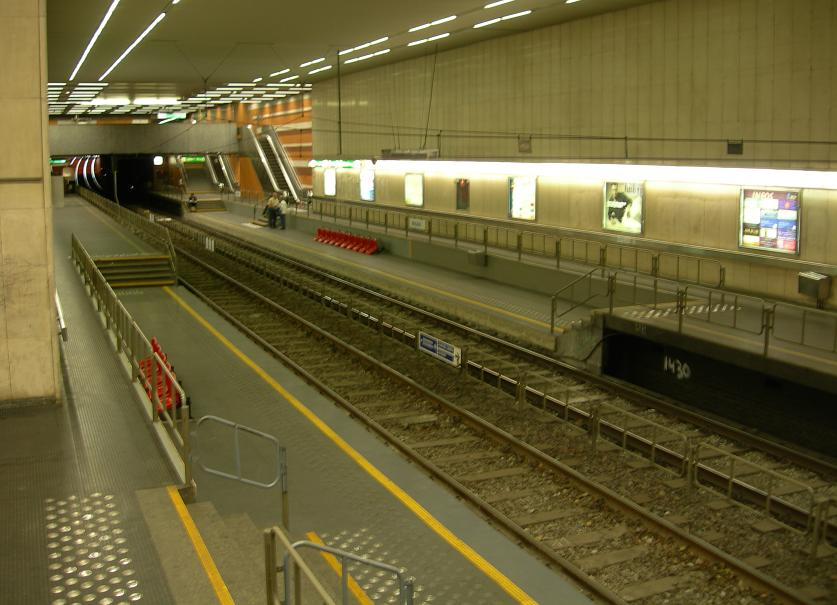
Platforms of Boileau premetro station, clearly showing the dual platform heights

Under the Brussels-South railway station, the premetro and metro tracks swap from running on the right to running on the left where they run parallel to provide cross-platform interchange between the two lines. This serves no apparent purpose, but may be because main line trains in Belgium run on the left. Trams cross back to the right under the Place Bara/Baraplein, but the metro stays on the left as far as the Roi Baudouin/Koning Boudewijn terminus.

A 2007 paper calculated that delays caused by traffic congestion were responsible for direct costs of €17.34 million per year - over 18% of the production cost of the tram network. The costs chiefly comprised drivers' wages (60%) and additional vehicles (25%), and excluded overheads and the cost of time lost by passengers. In an attempt to remedy this, by 2016, Brussels Mobility had installed traffic light priority for trams or buses at 150 junctions. In some other places, the track layout is used to avoid hold-ups; for instance on route 92 at the Ma Campagne and Janson crossroads, which lie 300 metres (980 ft) from each other on the Chaussée de Charleroi/Charleroisesteenweg. There is lateral space for only one track in a raised central reservation, and the rails swerve to the left approximately 100 metres (330 ft) in front of the junction so that cars can queue in the right-hand lane.

Between 2006 and 2009, a phased transformation of the network took place, with the aim of improving regularity and relieving overcrowding. The premetro service between Brussels-North railway station and Albert was restructured with fewer lines passing through it, but at more regular intervals. These routes use the new longer Bombardier trams. The major part of the North–South Axis (from Lemonnier to Rogier) is now used only by lines 3 and 4 during the day, branded Chrono. Tram line 55 from Schaerbeek (north of Brussels) that used to use the North–South Axis now terminates at Rogier. The old line 52 was replaced by line 3 in the north (from Brussels-South to Thomas and from Van Praet to Esplanade), 82 (from Drogenbos to Lemonnier) and 32 in the south. The old tram line 56 was also withdrawn.

A previously implemented part of the plan was the creation of line 25 in April 2007. Line 25 goes from Rogier to the Boondael/Boondaal railway station following the route of the former line 90 from Rogier to Buyl, then leaves the outer ring towards the Université libre de Bruxelles (ULB)'s Solbosch/Solbos campus.

On 14 March 2011, old lines 23 and 24 were merged to create the new eastern semicircular premetro line 7, which runs almost entirely in its own right of way from Heysel/Heizel in the north to Vanderkindere in the south.

Line 3 was removed from the network on 23 September 2023 and was replaced by lines 10 and 35.

=== Current routes ===
Valid as of 26 October 2026.

Route Number	From	To	Journey Time	Frequency	Amplitude	Note
Tram 4	Gare du Nord / Noordstation	Stalle (P)	35min.	5'-8'	05:28-00:16	
Tram 7	Heysel / Heizel	Vanderkindere	63min.	5'-8'	05:16-23:53	
Tram 8	Louise / Louiza	Roodebeek	52min.	6'-8'	05:12-00:17	
Tram 9	Simonis	Roi Baudouin / Koning Boudewijn	20min.	6'-10'	04:56-00:43	
Tram 10	Hôpital Militaire / Militair Hospitaal	Churchill	21min.	1'-5'	05:00-01:06	
Tram 18	Albert	Van Haelen	30min.	4'-9'	05:09-00:23	
Tram 19	De Wand	Groot-Bijgaarden	35min.	4'-8'	05:10-00:36	
Tram 25	Rogier	Boondael Gare / Boondaal Station	44min.	6'-8'	05:15-00:11	
Tram 35	Esplanade	Schaerbeek Gare / Schaarbeek Station	15min.	8'	05:05-00:05	
Tram 39	Montgomery	Ban-Eik	27min.	6'-10'	05:29-00:31	
Tram 44	Montgomery	Tervuren Station	23min.	6'-10'	05:17-00:20	
Tram 51	Stade / Stadion	Van Haelen	69min.	6'-10'	05:21-00:13	
Tram 55	Rogier	Da Vinci	28min.	5'	05:11-00:11	
Tram 62	Eurocontrol	Cimetière de Jette / Kerkhof van Jette	40min.	12'-15'	05:28-00:15	
Tram 81	Montgomery	Marius Renard	55min.	4'-8'	05:30-00:25	
Tram 82	Gare de Berchem / Berchem Station	Drogenbos	62min.	6'-8'	05:08-00:13	
Tram 92	Schaerbeek Gare / Schaarbeek Station	Fort-Jaco	61min.	6'-8'	05:34-23:56	
Tram 93	Legrand	Stade / Stadion	55min.	6'-8'	05:45-00:05	
Tram 97	Louise / Louiza	Dieweg	45min.	10'-12'	05:35-00:16	

Stricken-out (barré/doorgestreepte) route numbers represent partial services (they do not go up to the end of the line). Only regular services are shown in this list.

Map of the Brussels metro and tram network

=== Termini ===
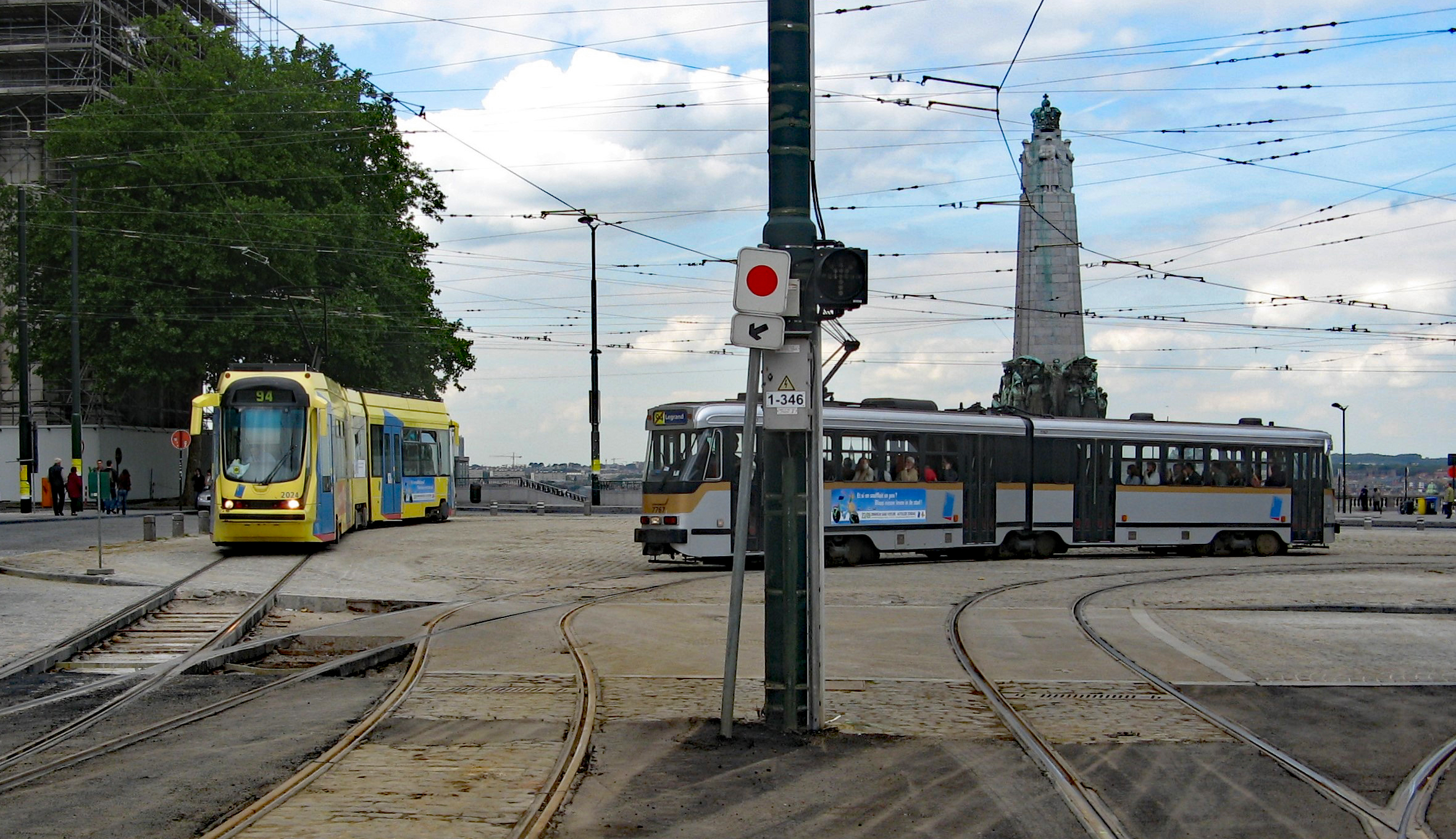
A yellow tram 94 waits in the short-lived turning loop, while a silver 94 barré crosses through the middle, Place Poelaert/Poelaertplein, 2007

The system contains 14 stub termini and 10 loop termini, while 3 routes (4 at Brussels-North, 25 at Boondael and 55 at Bordet) terminate on central tracks between continuing lines. At Vanderkindere, route 7 terminates by reversing on the through tracks. Over the years, loops have gradually been replaced by stub termini when opportunities have presented themselves. In 2007, a loop was built on the Place Poelaert/Poelaertplein to accommodate short-running 94 trams, which had the peculiarity that the through line bifurcated it. It was lifted after only a few months. The 51 terminus at Van Haelen was originally planned as a loop, but was eventually built, in 2008, as a stub. In around 2011, the reversing triangle for route 39 at Ban Eik was converted into a stub. The 19 terminus at Groot-Bijgaarden lost its 650-metre-long (2,130 ft) triangular loop on 18 October 2021.

Lines 3 and 7 both link the Heysel/Heizel Plateau in the north-west of the city with Churchill in Uccle in the south, the 3 traversing the western side of the city centre and the 7 following the eastern ring road. At the Churchill terminus, a strictly-timed manoeuvre takes place to allow trams to lay over and then depart in the reverse direction.

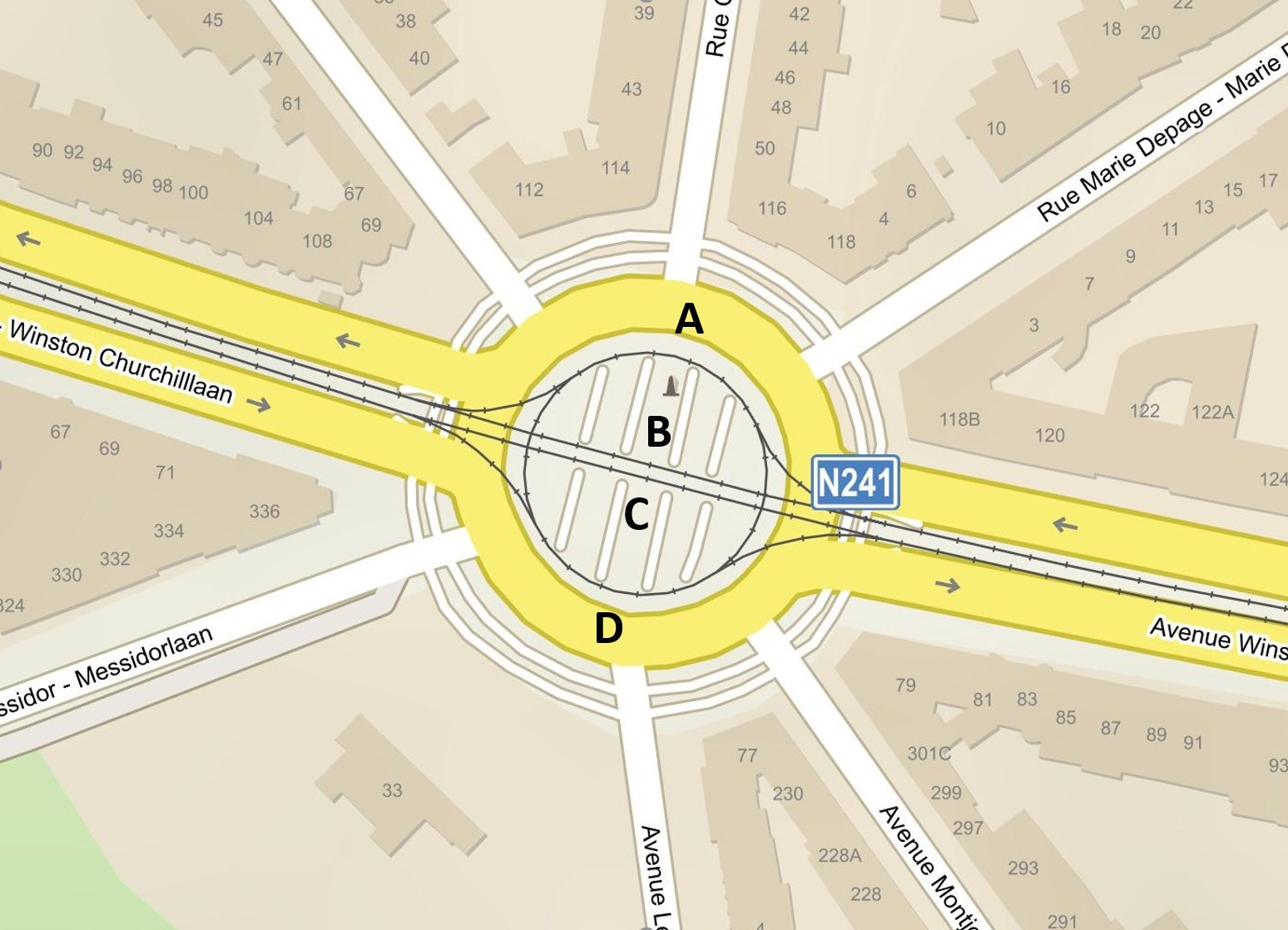
Map of 'Churchill' tram terminus

The terminus is situated in the middle of a traffic roundabout where eight streets meet, and consists of a circle of track bisected by a through line, connected by four sets of points. The manoeuvre consists of the following steps:

1. Tram 7 arrives from east onto northern central platform (B). Through passengers transfer to tram 3 waiting at northern peripheral platform (A);
2. Tram 3 departs westwards;
3. Tram 7 can now follow it to the next stop, Vanderkindere, where it reverses using a trailing crossover (and connects with routes 4 and 92);
4. This same tram 7 now arrives at the southern central platform (C);
5. A new tram 3 arrives from the west, following the 7 from Vanderkindere, and occupies the southern peripheral platform (D). Through passengers transfer to tram 7;
6. Tram 7 departs eastwards;
7. The tram 3 on layover drives round the eastern half of the loop from position (D) to reposition itself at the northern peripheral platform (A);
8. The cycle recommences.

While transferring passengers use the platforms within the roundabout, those boarding or alighting use four separate stops on the Avenue Winston Churchill/Winston Churchilllaan in pairs on either side of the junction, thus avoiding having to cross into the middle of the roundabout.

This situation will end when the city's central tram subway is converted in heavy metro line 3, whenceforth lines 3, 4 and 7 will all terminate at Albert.

=== Planned extensions ===
==== North of Brussels ====
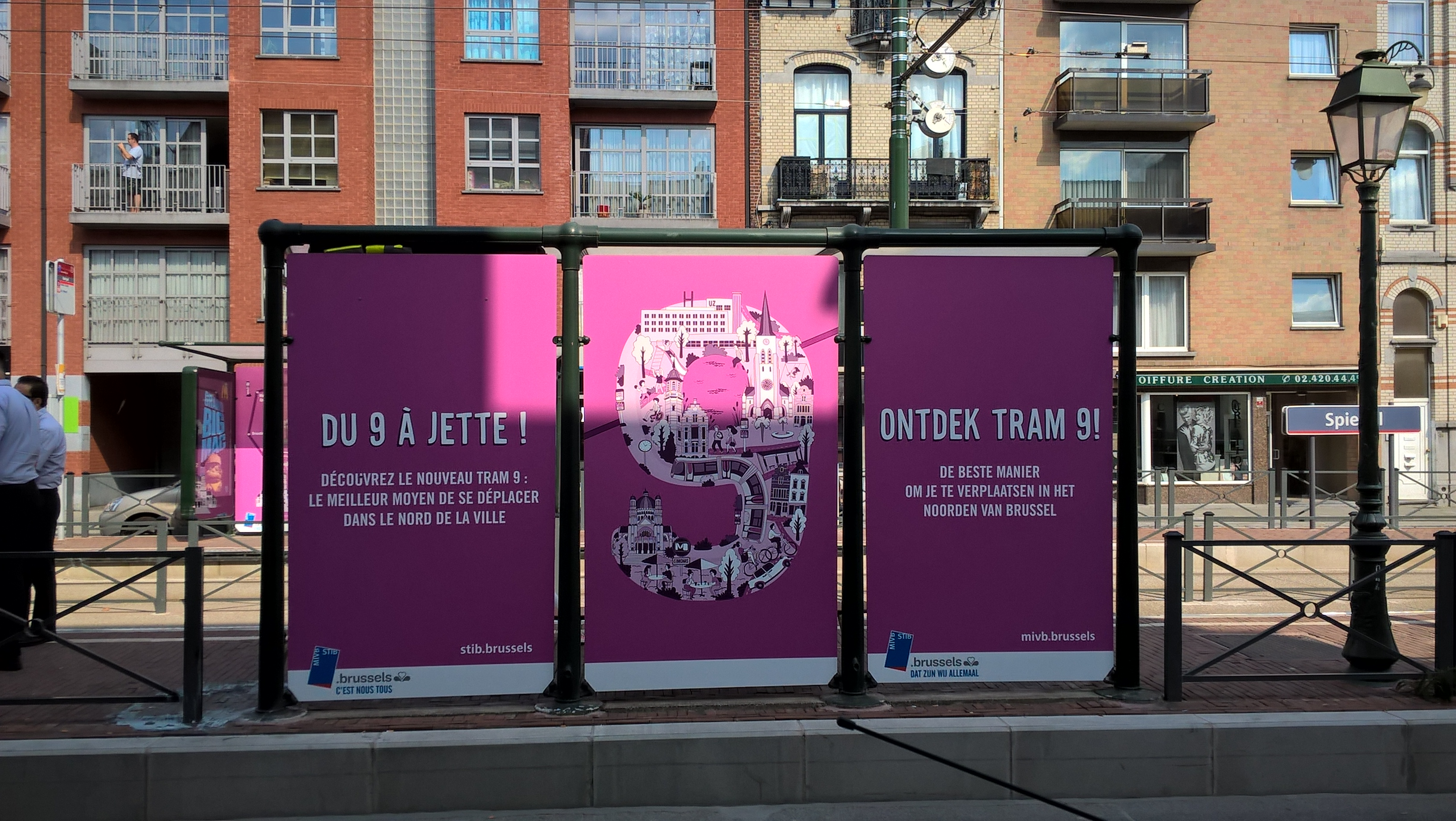
Punning advertisement for opening of tramline 9 at 'Miroir' stop, Avenue de Laeken/Lakense Laan, 2018

In the 21st-century political climate, investment in light rail has again taken off, and a number of extensions to the system are at various stages of fruition.

Lines 3, 7 and 9 are to be connected at Heysel/Heizel, and on 20 December 2018, Brussels Mobility Minister Pascal Smet announced that the next two lines to be built, estimated to open in 2024, will run from Rogier to Belgica via Brussels-North and Tour et Taxis/Thurn en Taxis (seat of the Flemish Regional Government).

The Flemish Region, under its Brabantnet plan, intends to build a new line to the north of the city, from Heysel/Heizel to Willebroek alongside the A12 road. Its success will require integration with the existing Brussels regional system; for instance the line will have to be built at standard rather than metre gauge (as the other Flemish trams are).

Three other suburban/interurban lines had been proposed: from Brussels westwards to Ninove, from Brussels north-eastwards to Heist-op-den-Berg, and from Heysel/Heizel via Vilvoorde to Brussels Airport.

The first two proposals were withdrawn, while the last has been implemented in 2020 as a 'tram-bus'. The Ringtrambus (originally numbered 820, now R20) from Brussels Airport to Jette opened on 28 June 2020, operated by 14 24-metre double-articulated buses. The initial half-hourly frequency was doubled to quarter-hourly on 1 September 2020.

===== South and central Brussels =====
Other proposals have been aborted. During 2014 and 2015, STIB/MIVB promoted a project to 'tramify' the Porte de Namur/Naamsepoort–Delta section of the overloaded 71 bus route, which carries over 12,000 passengers per day in each direction. The Brussels Region supported the proposal, but the municipality of Ixelles was against, supported by traders on the Chaussée d'Ixelles/Elsensesteenweg who feared the disruption the tracklaying would cause. The proposal was dropped and instead the section from the Chaussée de Wavre/Waversesteenweg to the Place Fernand Coq/Fernand Coqplein has been made largely car-free.

Other outline proposals have been made to extend the 62 to Brussels Airport (with the infrastructure being paid for by the Flemish Region), divert the 92 from the Rue Royale/Koningsstraat to serve Brussels Central Station, as well as to rebuild the east–west link through the city centre from Bourse/Beurs to the Place Royale/Koningsplein.

On 18 July 2019, the Brussels Government, in its programme for the period 2019–2024, committed itself to set the following additional developments in train: conversion of bus route 95 from the Central Station to the university area (partially making up for the failed conversion of route 71), extension of route 25 eastwards to serve the Mediapark, extension of route 7 westwards to Forest (this may include a tunnel under Forest Park from Albert, where lines 4, 7 and 51 will terminate when the heavy metro is extended to Albert) and conversion of route 49 to form a western ring line, as well as extension of route 8 northwards to Evere and eastwards to Jezus-Eik.

==== Tram 95 ====
On 8 November 2022, it was reported to the regional Mobility Committee that STIB/MIVB has launched a feasibility study on the 'tramification' of bus 95, to report in 2023. The 95 is Brussels' busiest bus route, on a par with the 71 at 7.25m passengers a year. Between Trône/Troon and Etterbeek Station, it is saturated at 1,000 passengers per hour in each direction. The best option would be to connect it to the planned tram from the Central Station to Tour & Taxis, but this poses the question of how to route it through the city centre. As for the southern terminus, it might be truncated to the ULB or Delta.

==== 13 new projects by 2035 ====
On 28 March 2023 the Brussels regional government announced a new "Tram Plan" to build 13 new lines totalling 40 km in length by 2035. STIB/MIVB published more detail on 5 May 2023. The 13 major projects are:

1. the extension of line 62 to the airport at Zaventem
2. line 10 to Neder-Over-Hembeek (opened 23 September 2024)
3. the 'Mediatram' serving the Mediapark in Schaerbeek/Schaarbeek and terminating at Kraainem/Crainhem
4. a western ring tram, partially replacing buses 49 and 53
5. extension of line 8 to the ADEPS sport centre in Auderghem/Oudergem
6. the northward extension of line 8 from Roodebeek to Bordet
7. a bypass for line 8 between De Mot and Roosevelt
8. the connection of lines 3 and 9 at Heysel/Heizel, serving Parking C
9. the tramification of bus 95 from Central Station to ULB in Ixelles/Elsene
10. a line from Central Station to Tour et Taxis/Thurn en Taxis
11. a link from Bockstael to Sobieski
12. the linking of Albert and Rochefort (line 7)
13. the improvement of the eastern ring, including a tunnel under Place Meiser/Meiserplein

=== Track maintenance ===
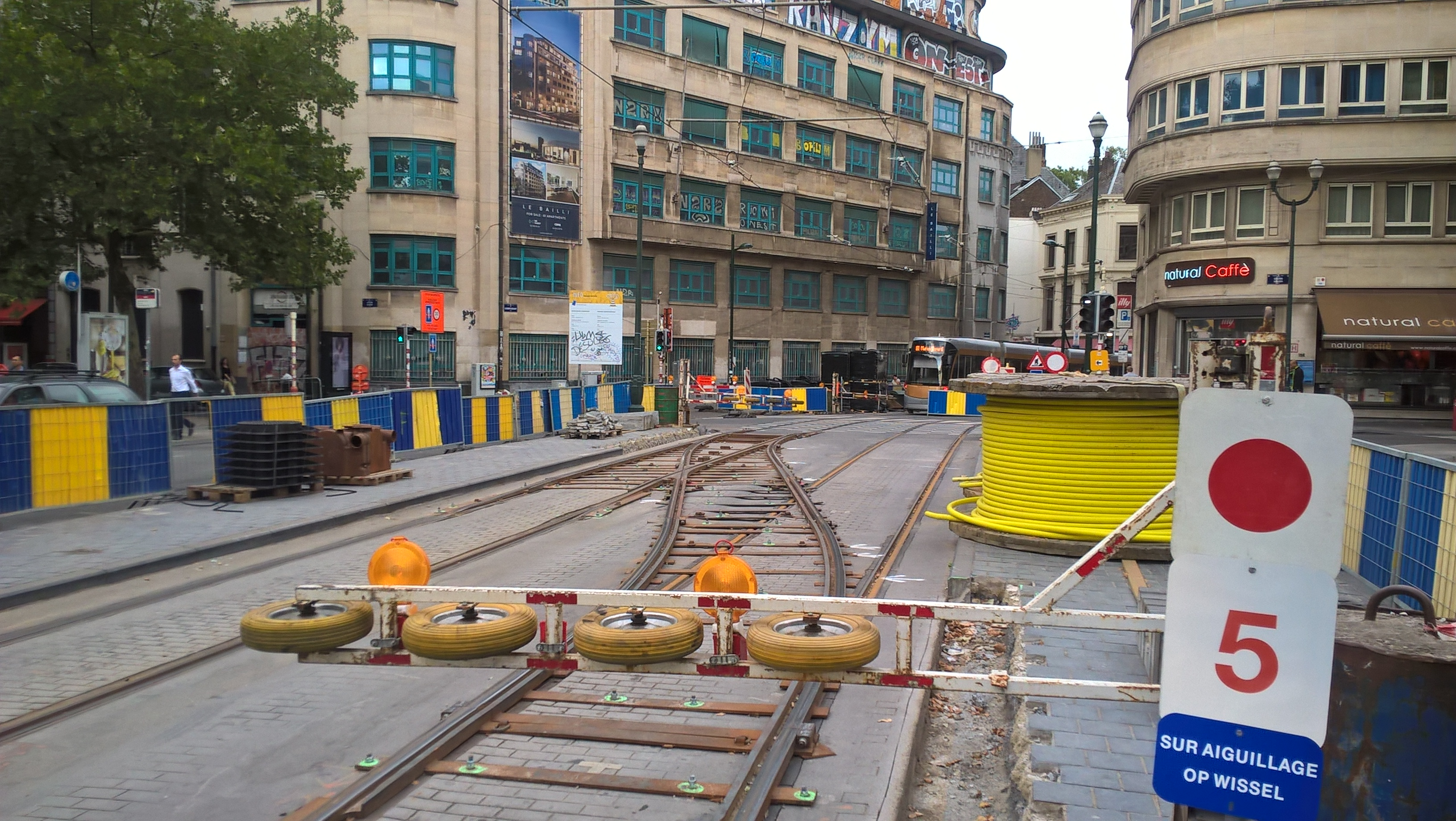
Temporary or 'Californian' points installed on line 81, junction of the Avenue Louise/Louizalaan and the Rue du Bailli/Baljuwstraat, 2018

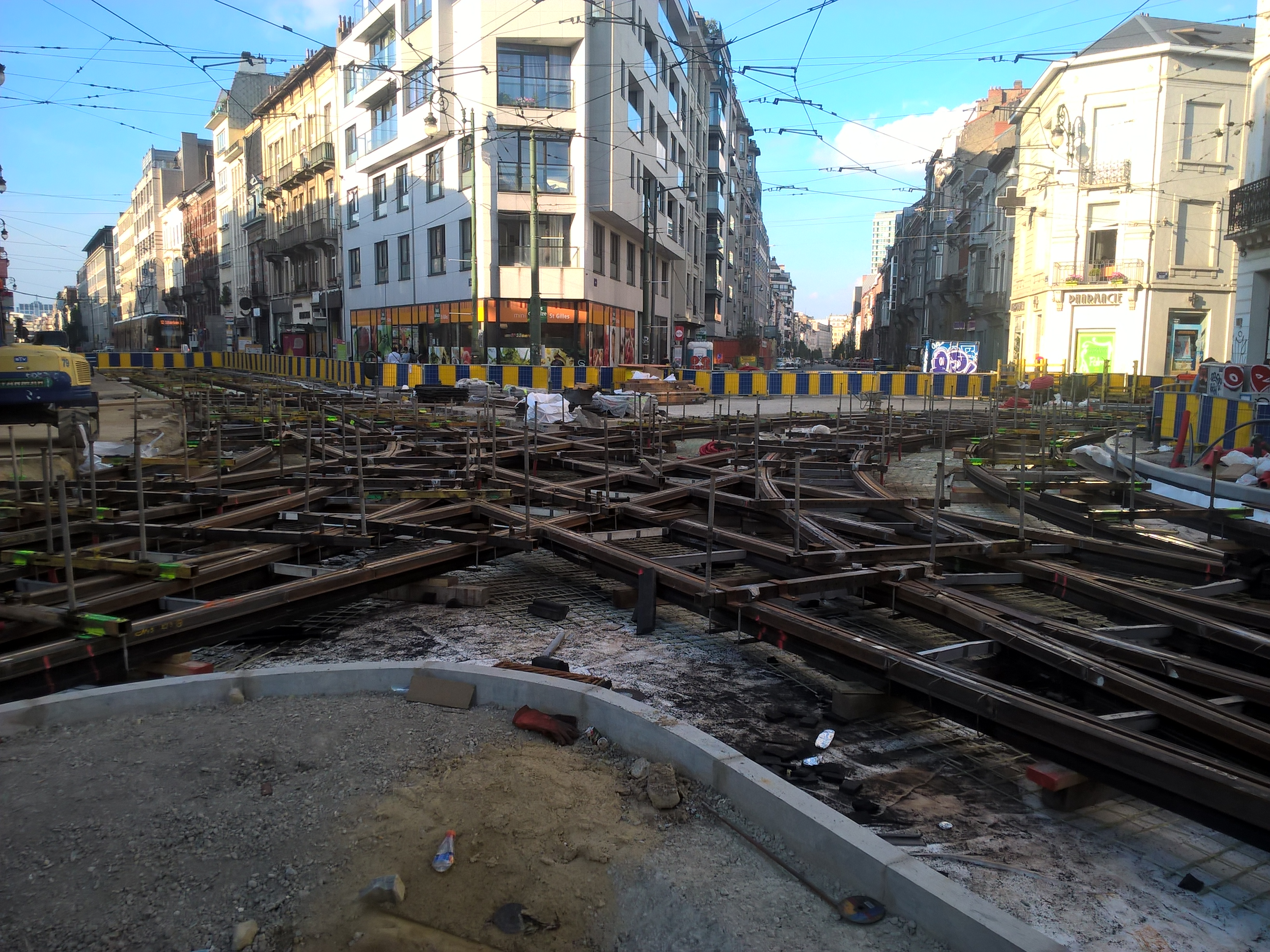
Relaying route 81, 92 and 97 tram tracks on top of a concrete raft, 'Janson' stop, 2015

Tracks are renewed periodically, both when they wear out, and also to increase the lateral clearance between them, to enable the safe passage of wider trams. Minor imperfections are smoothed by in-situ welding. When a temporary diversion is required, STIB/MIVB often installs a set of temporary or 'Californian' points which sits on top of the permanent rails.

Tracks have historically been embedded in stone setts, with STIB/MIVB taking responsibility for the road up to 30 cm (12 in) on either side of the rails. However, recently, tarmac has been used, which improves conditions for cyclists.

In recent years, when major junctions have been relaid, the opportunuity has been taken to increase stability by installing a concrete raft underneath the whole junction.

=== Signalling ===
On the overground parts of the network, trams drive at sight, while the underground premetro sections have block signalling. However, drivers do not need to check in and out of the signalled section as on the Muni system in San Francisco. An exception is in the earliest tunnel to be built, at the Lemonnier stop, where passengers cross the tracks using an underground level crossing. This station will be bypassed when the line is converted to heavy metro and the new Toots Thielemans station built slightly to its east.

== Vehicles ==
=== Fleet ===
As of 18 September 2017, the fleet consists of 396 trams, of the following types:

- 64 7700-series 2-section PCCs (20 m (66 ft))
- 61 7900-series 3-section PCCs (27 m (89 ft))
- 51 2000-series 3-section purpose-built Bombardier T2000s
- 150 3000-series 5-section Flexity Outlook Cityrunners (30 m (98 ft))
- 70 4000-series 7-section Flexities (41 m (135 ft))

As of 18 June 2019, 90 new sets of Flexities are on order.

=== High-floor and low-floor ===
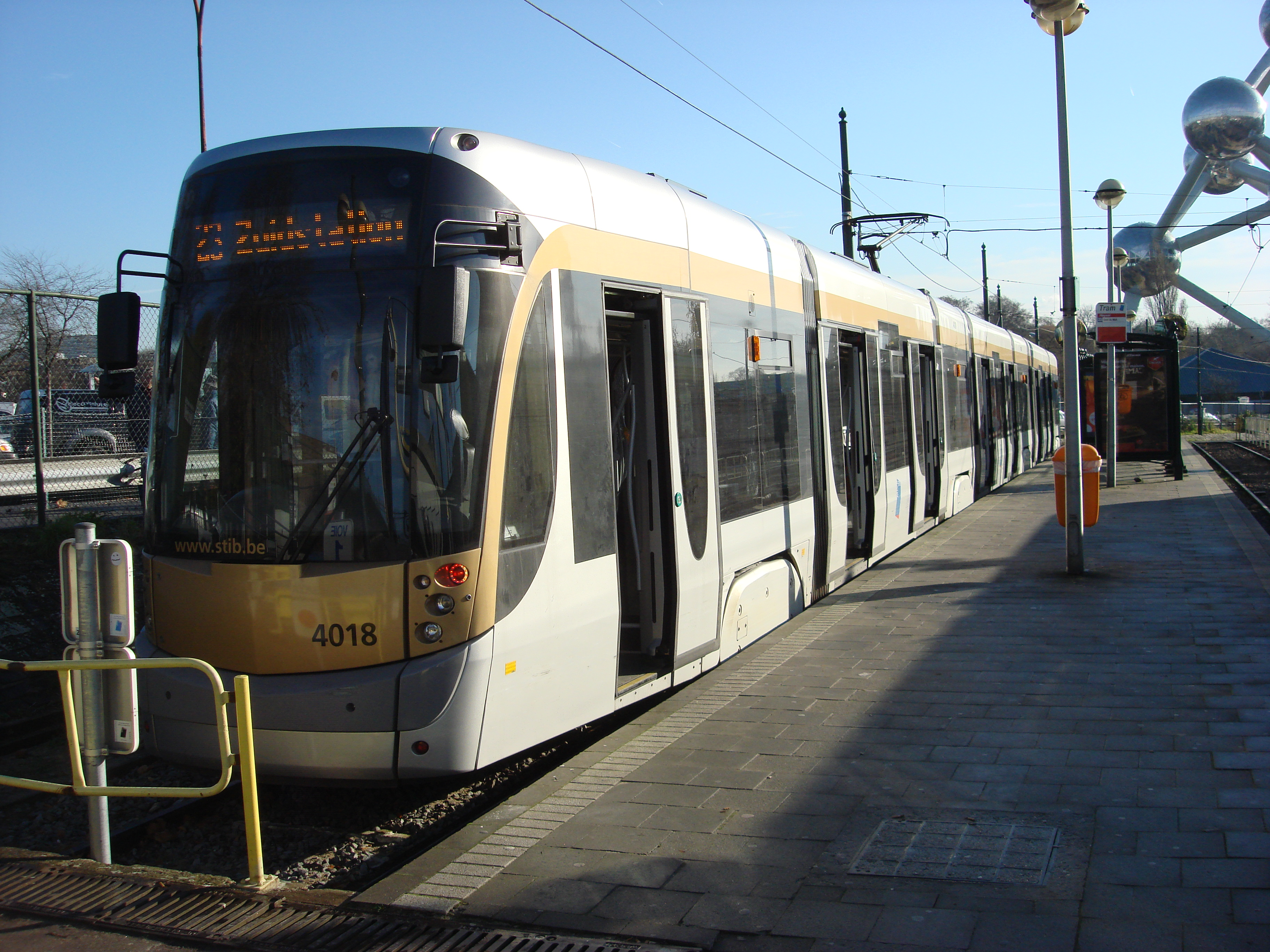
A 4000 series tram, 'Heysel/Heizel' stop, 2007

The development of the system is being pulled in two contradictory directions – towards low-floor street-running trams and high-floor underground railway. This has led to some conflicting decisions. The standard trams—still "PCC's from the 1950s and 60s—have been followed by the specially designed "T2000" low-floor model and, at the end of 2005, by a variant of the off-the-shelf "Flexity Outlook" from Bombardier (3000 series), and, at the end of 2006, by an even longer version of the same family (4000 series).

On some of the busiest routes, the convenience of the low floor is lost because of the anomalies caused by the hesitant upgrade of tram to metro. The city has four heavy metro lines and three stretches of premetro or underground tram. The premetro tunnels have been built to allow for eventual upgrade to heavy metro, so most of the platform is high, and is connected to the street (at least in the upward direction) by escalator. At some stations lifts have been installed, but there is a cutout section taking the level down to one foot above ground to board the trams. The three steps this entails make life difficult for passengers with baby buggies or suitcases, even though the new low-floor trams are accessible to wheel-chair users. To get around this last barrier to mobility, an experimental ramp was installed in 2009 at Parvis de Saint-Gilles/Sint-Gillis Voorplein.

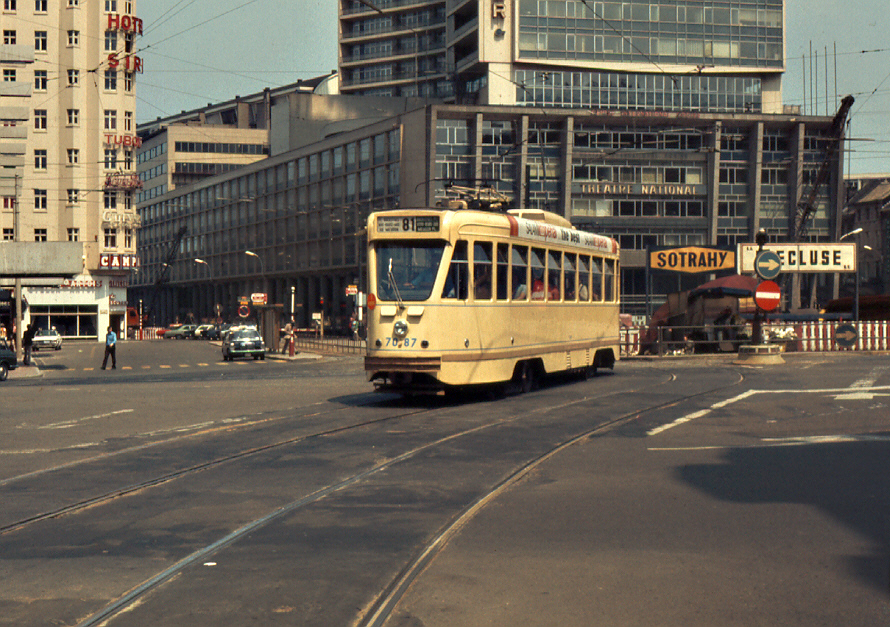
A PCC leaving the Place Charles Rogier/Karel Rogierplein for Brussels-South railway station, before the opening of the North–South Axis. The tram stop in the background was also used by the vicinal, which had its terminal loop here.

=== Coupled sets ===
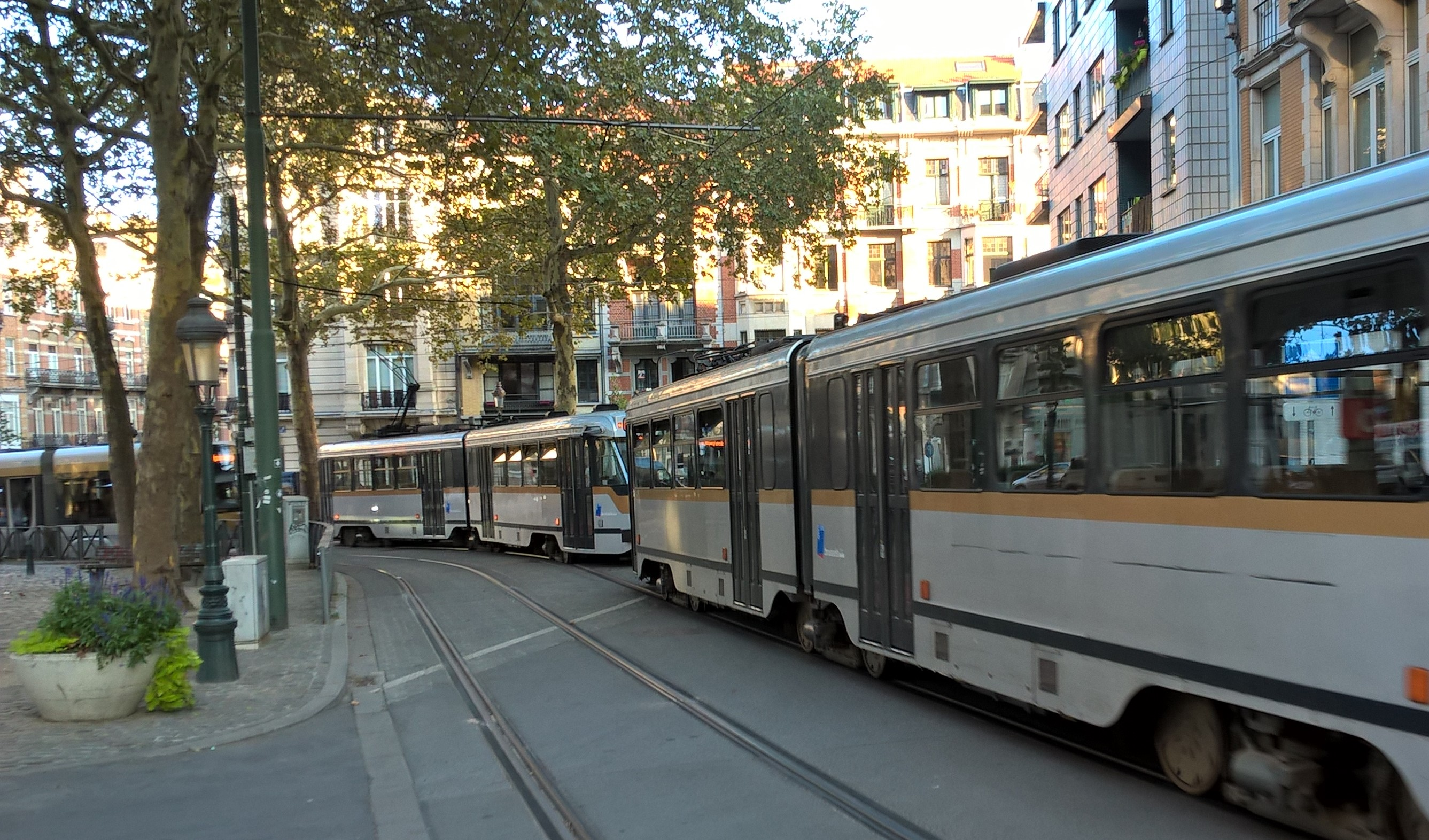
Coupled PCC trams on test, Place Van Meenen/Van Meenenplein, 2018

Coupled sets are not currently used, although since around 2015, tests have been made of pairs of PCCs connected by a towbar. All vehicles still carry a towbar, which is only used nowadays when a broken-down tram needs to be towed or pushed to the depot.

=== Livery ===
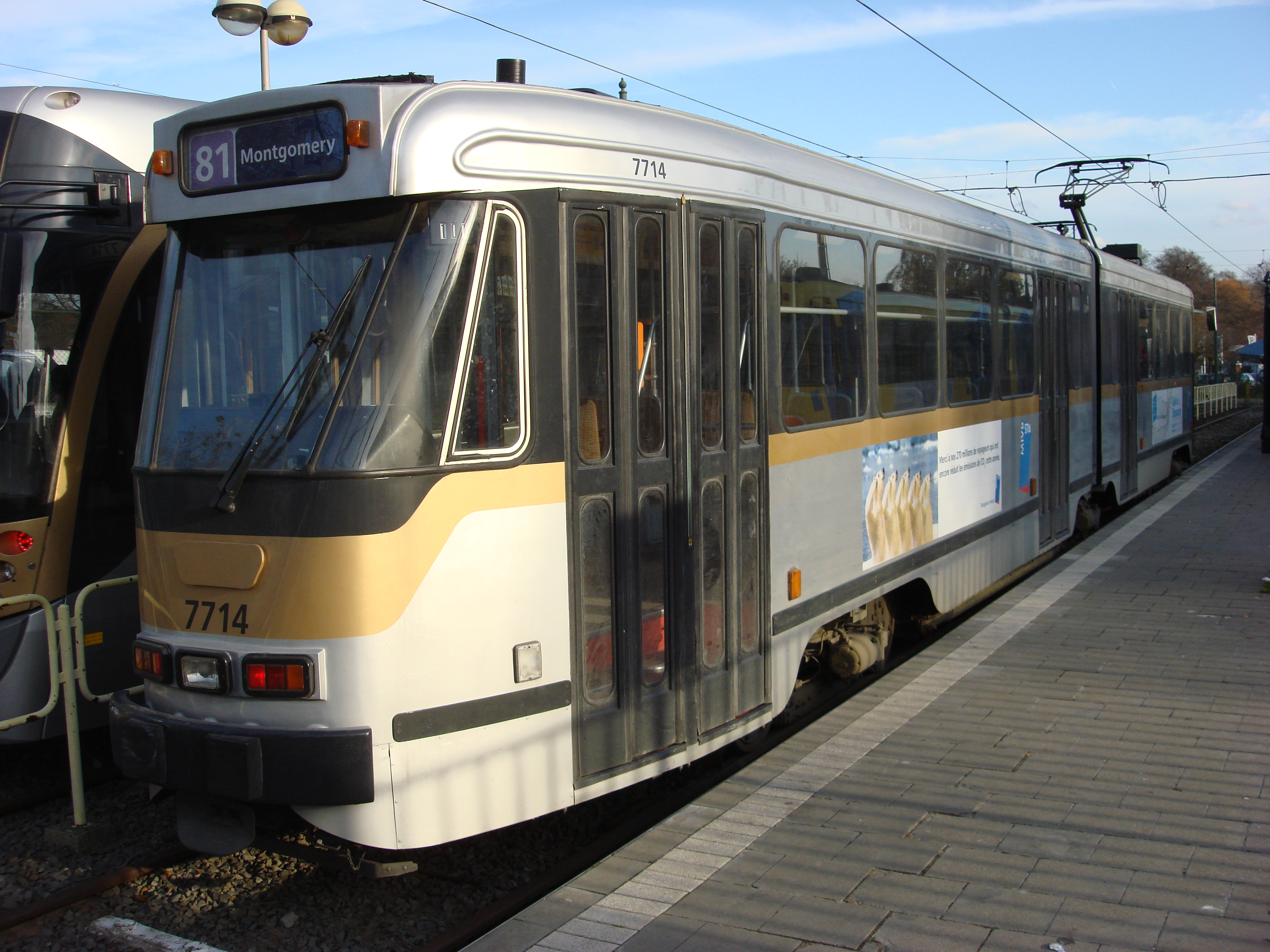
A PCC tram in the so-called Art Nouveau livery, 2007

Brussels trams have known several liveries. In the beginning of the 20th century, those operated by the Tramways Bruxellois were dark green, and those by the Chemins de Fer Economiques were chocolate. The two companies merged in the 1920s, whereupon a standard livery of primrose yellow was adopted which lasted (with some minor changes in the trimmings) until the mid-1990s when a brighter shade of yellow was adopted.

A profound change in livery came in 2006 with the adoption of the so-called Art Nouveau livery of silver and light brown on the new 3000 and 4000 vehicles. The rest of the active fleet has been repainted.

=== Heritage trams ===
The system exists in happy symbiosis with an active heritage operation based out of the Woluwe depot, and privately hired trams that have free access to the tracks. Trams that still collect their current through trolley poles rather than pantographs are normally restricted to the scenic line from the Parc du Cinquantenaire/Jubelpark via Woluwe to Tervuren, which is run with the help of volunteers from the Brussels Tram Museum, whose board has a strong representation from STIB/MIVB. These run on weekends from April to October; occasionally, such as on Belgian National Day (21 July), these trams appear in the city centre, where the line on the Rue Royale is trolleypole-enabled.

A few heritage trams are equipped with pantographs, which can travel all over the city (except in the premetro tunnels because they are not equipped with the speed control system required there); every Sunday from April to September, and one Sunday a month outside this period, a 5000-series trams (two-bogie model built 1935) takes tourists on a four-hour circuit of the Brussels-Capital Region with a 50-minute pause around noon.

A number of Brussels trams have been acquired by museums abroad. In the UK, the North Yorkshire Moors Railway has restored and operates steam tram engine 1625 ("Lucie") built in 1890 for the Tramways de Bruxelles à Evere et Extensions.

Several trams have been sent to the United States. Tram 7037 is in San Francisco, operating on the F-Line, surreally repainted in the blue-and-white livery of Zürich. Tram 1504 is at the Trolley Museum of New York, 1511 is at Old Pueblo Trolley and 7169 is operated by the M-Line Trolley in Dallas, Texas. The Oregon Electric Railway Museum has nine former Brussels trams.

In Canada, a 4-axle PCC is awaiting restoration at the Ontario St shed of Vancouver's Downtown Historic Railway, and in Argentina, the Asociación Amigos del Tranvía in Buenos Aires operates tram 9069.

=== Special-purpose trams ===
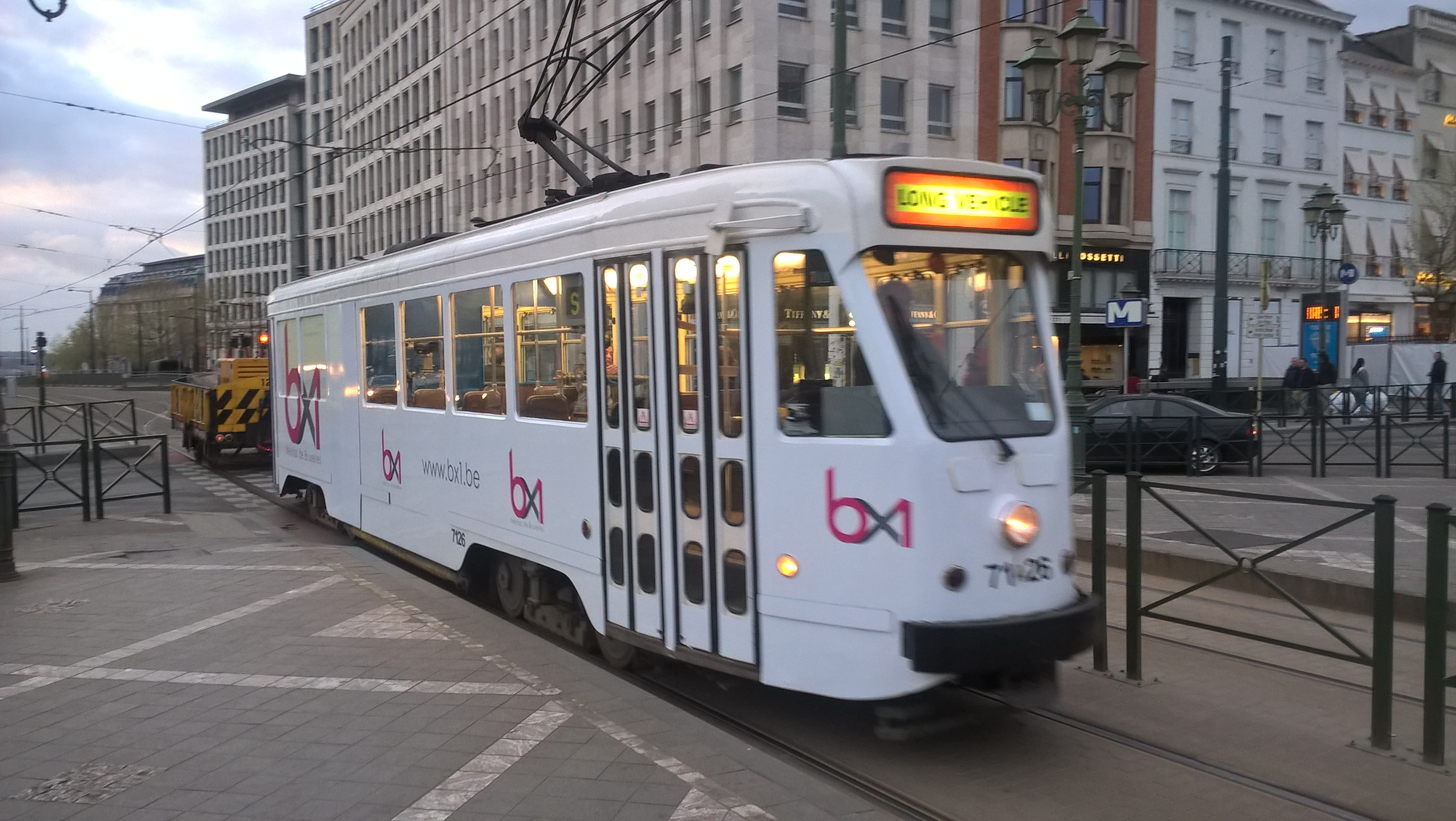
Car 7126, BX1's Le Tram mobile studio, Place Louise/Louizaplein, 2017

One PCC tram was converted in 2012 into a mobile restaurant, which operates six evenings per week. Its fleet number is 7601, formerly 7765 and before that 7565. The drivers of this mobile restaurant follow a special course in "soft driving" in order to avoid spilling the diners' wine or their soup.

A second PCC tram, 7126, serves as a mobile studio for the Le Tram television programme broadcast by BX1 (formerly Télé Bruxelles) every other Sunday, during which an interview is conducted while the tram tours Brussels. The tram tows a generator trailer.

=== 2010 Vancouver Olympics ===
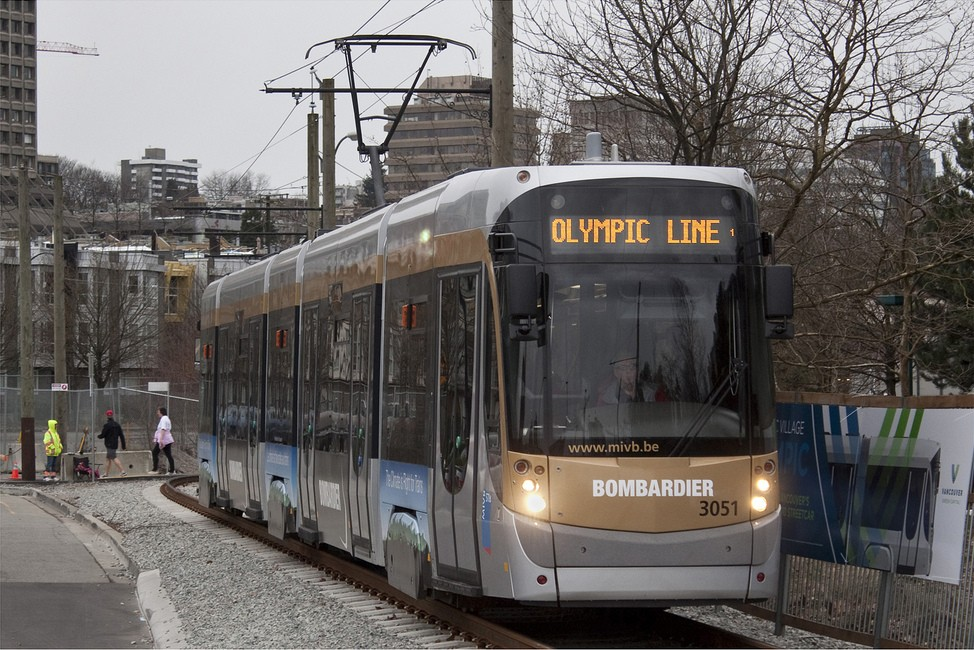
Brussels trams on loan to Vancouver for demonstration during the 2010 Winter Olympics

From 21 January to 21 March 2010, a demonstration streetcar project, known as the Olympic Line, in Vancouver, British Columbia, Canada, used cars 3050 & 3051 (Bombardier Flexity Outlook) on a Vancouver Downtown Historic Railway 1.8 km (1.1 mi) track.

== Depots ==
STIB/MIVB has 7 depots and maintenance facilities:

- Avenue du Roi/Koningslaan (Saint-Gilles): 63 trams
- Rue d'Enghien/Edingenstraat (Molenbeek-Saint-Jean): 39 trams
- Houtweg (Haren), a major bus, tram and metro reception and repair facility: 87 trams
- Avenue de l'Hippodrome/Rennbaanlaan (Ixelles): 98 trams
- Chaussée de Haecht/Haachtsesteenweg (Schaerbeek): 40 trams
- Woluwe, on the site of the Brussels Tram Museum: 35 trams
- Marconi (Forest), the newest depot, fully opened in 2017: 34 trams

== Statistics ==
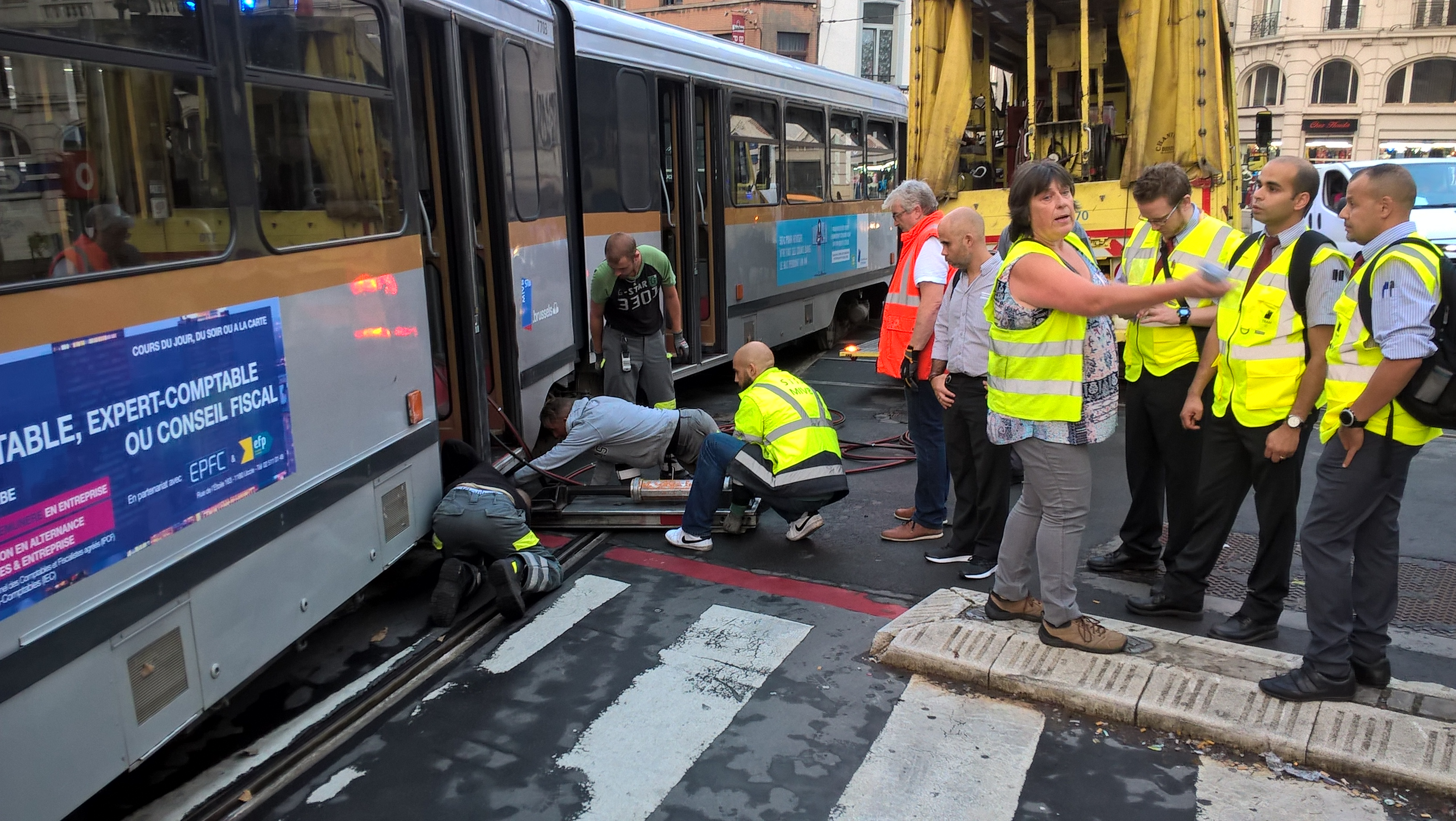
STIB/MIVB staff use a pneumatic ram to rerail a 97 tram, Barrière de Saint-Gilles/Bareel Sint-Gillis, 2018

Most of these statistics come from STIB/MIVB's 2018 activity report, though some are from previous reports.

- Passenger journeys (2018): 165.5 million
- Length of tram line (double-track, 2018): 147.1 km (91.4 mi), of which 85.6 km (53.2 mi) (60%) are in dedicated lanes (i.e. own right-of-way) and 12.4 km (7.7 mi) (9%) of which are in tunnel
- Average distance between stops (2018): 411 metres
- Number of junctions with traffic light priority for trams (2020): 320
- Vehicle-kilometres travelled (2018): 15.3 million
- Seat-kilometres travelled (2018): 2,932 million
- Commercial speed (2017) 15.9 km/h (9.9 mph)
- Share of passengers holding a season-ticket (2017): 87%
- Number of trams (2017): 397
- Peak run-out (winter 2017): 301
- Number of depots (2018): 7, with 2 workshops
- Number of points: about 850, including those in depots

== See also ==
- Brussels Metro
- List of town tramway systems
- List of town tramway systems in Belgium
- European Tramdriver Championship, which Brussels hosted and won in 2019
