= Bombardier T2000 =

Belgian tram vehicle series

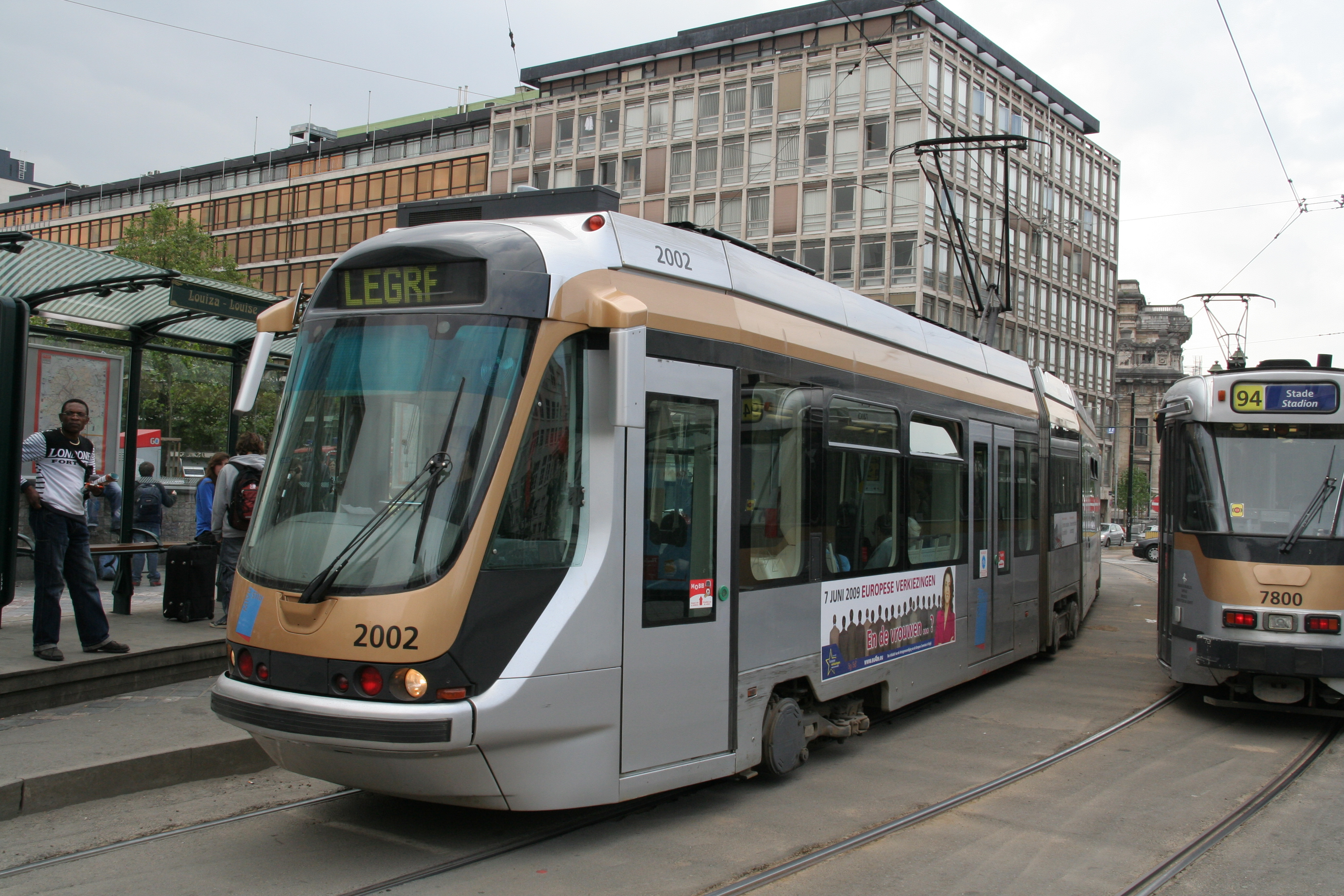
- A T2000 at Louise/Louiza tram stop
- Manufacturer: Bombardier Transportation
- Built at: Mannheim, Germany
- Entered service: 1993–present
- Number built: 51
- Fleet numbers: 2001–2051
- Capacity: 149–161
- Lines served: Brussels tram system

Specifications
- Train length: 22.8 m (74 ft 9 5/8 in)
- Width: 2.3 m (7 ft 6 1/2 in)
- Height: 3.4 m (11 ft 1 7/8 in)
- Doors: 8 (4 per side)
- Articulated sections: 2 (three sections)
- Maximum speed: 70 km/h (43 mph)
- Weight: 35.70 t (35.14 long tons; 39.35 short tons)
- Traction system: GTO–VVVF
- Electric system(s): 750 V DC overhead lines
- Current collector(s): Pantograph
- UIC classification: (A1)+Bo′+(1A)
- Track gauge: 1,435 mm (4 ft 8 1/2 in) standard gauge

The Bombardier T2000, or Tram 2000, is a low-floor tram design developed for use on the Brussels tram system. The Brussels tram system has a fleet of 51 cars that were delivered from 1993 to 1995. They were the first low-floor designs used on the Brussels tram system. The cars are double ended cars with driver's cabin on both ends and separated from passengers. They were made to replace the previous PCC7000 trams. Made in Mannheim, Germany, they have a 100% low-floor design, which was later used on Flexity Outlook vehicles ordered by Brussels Intercommunal Transport Company as the successor to the T2000.

The T2000 is attributed to generating more vibrations affecting surrounding structures than other trams in the STIB/MIVB fleet.
