= Flexity Outlook =

Series of low-floor trams

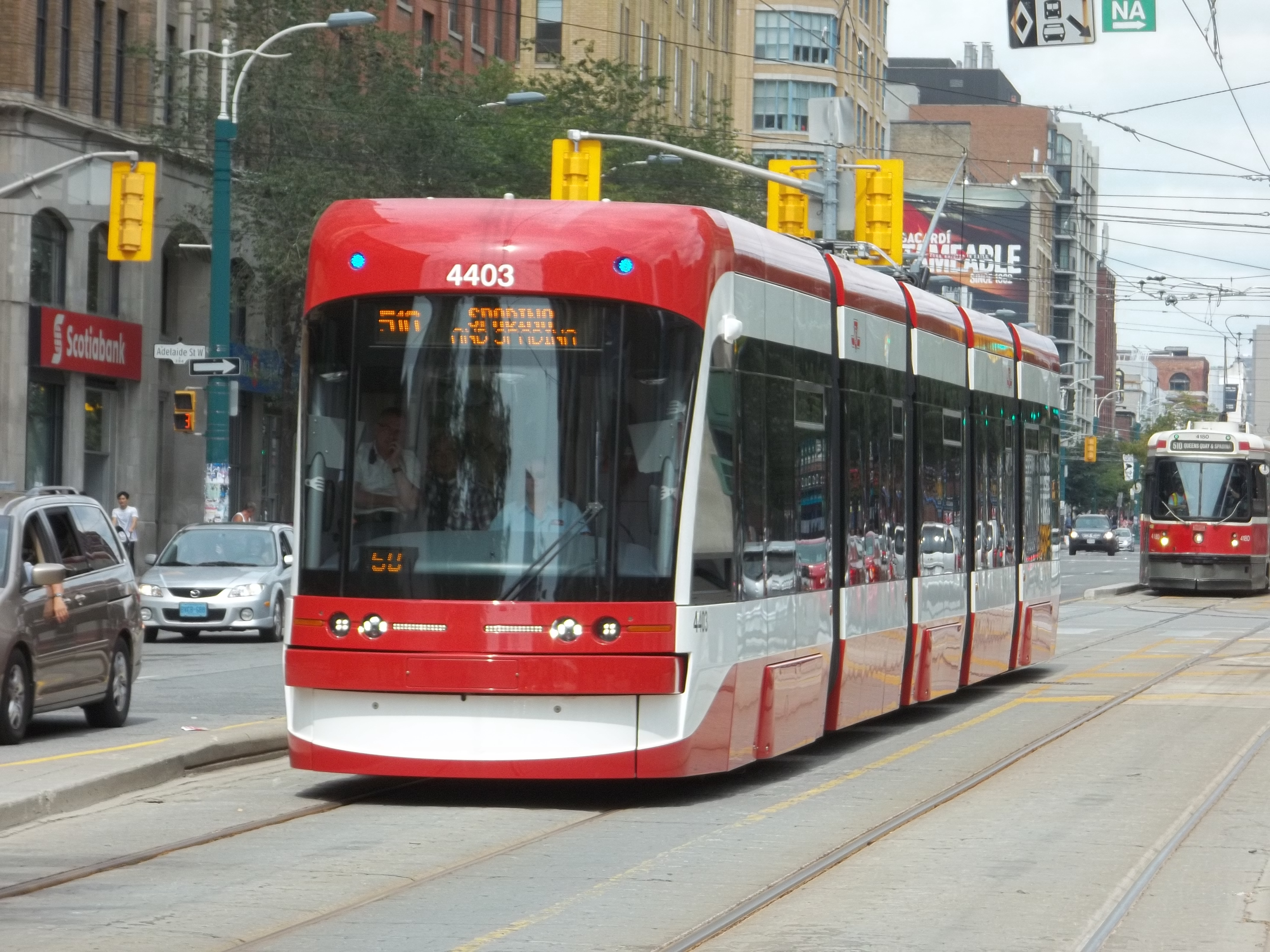
Flexity Outlook in Toronto, Canada

The Bombardier Flexity Outlook is a series of low-floor trams of the multi-articulated type, manufactured by Bombardier Transportation. Part of the larger Bombardier Flexity product line (many of which are not low-floor), Flexity Outlook vehicles are modular in design and commonly used throughout Europe.

== Types ==
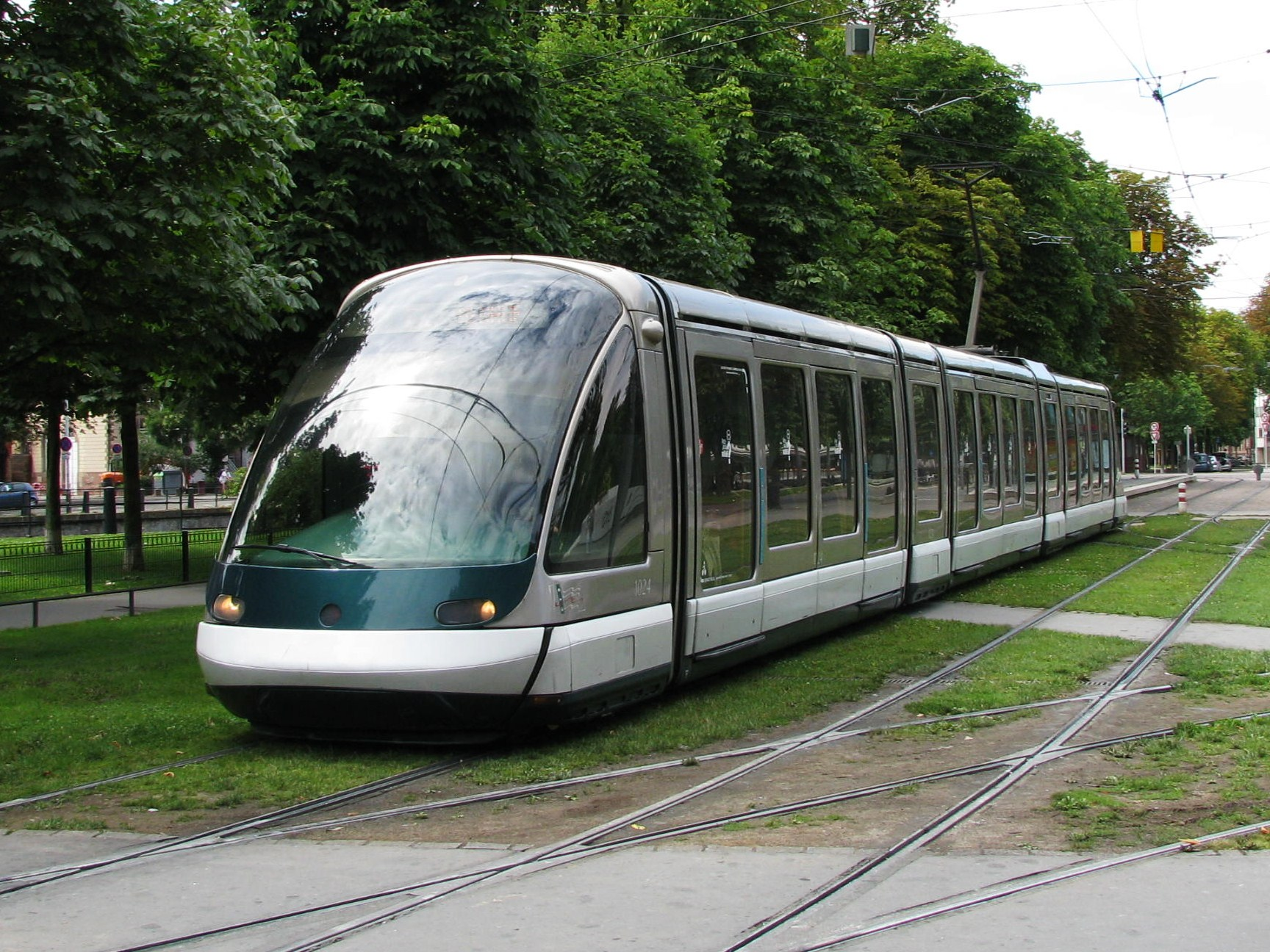
The Eurotram in Strasbourg

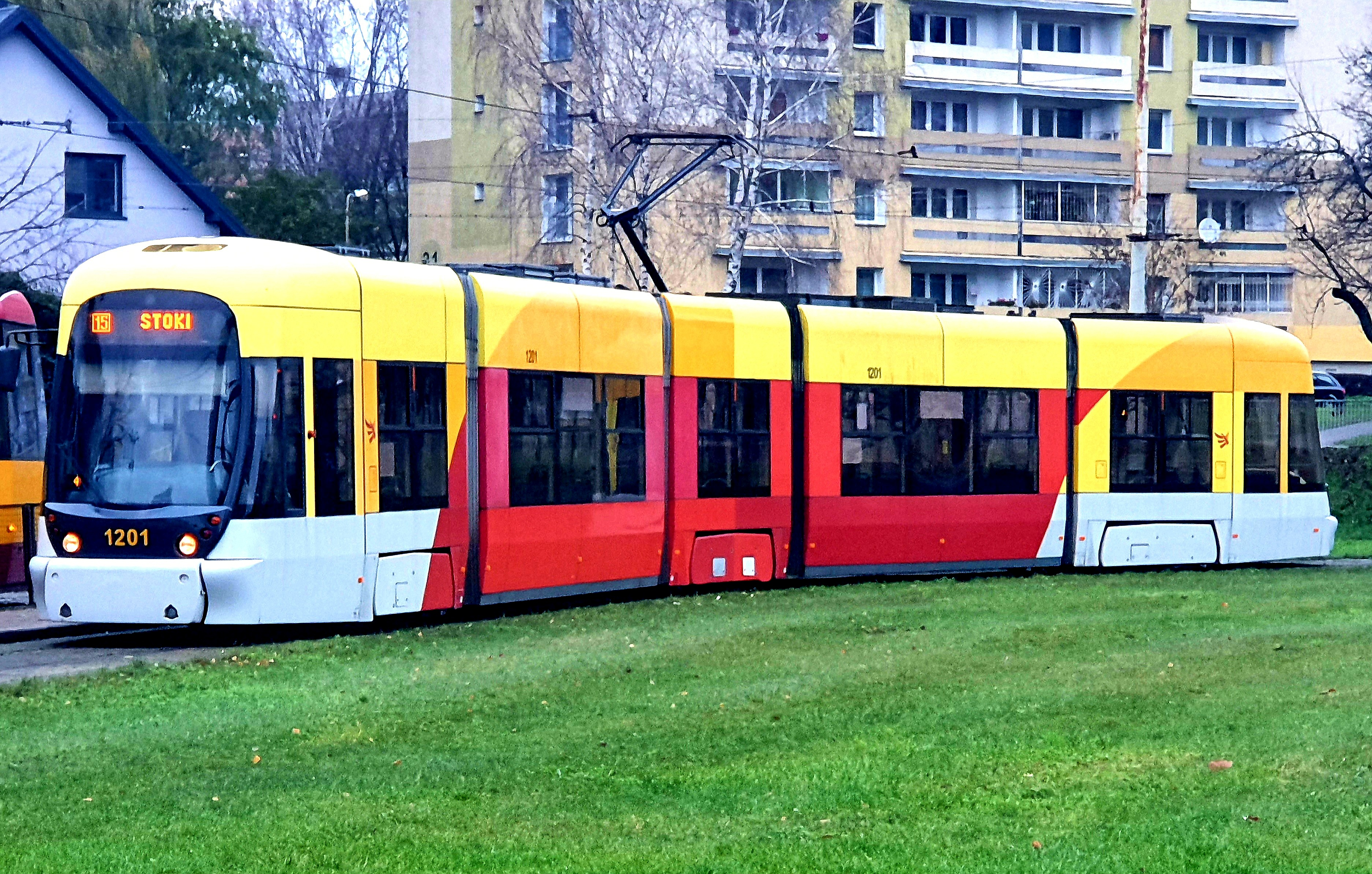
Cityrunner in Łódź, Poland

Bombardier marketed two types or families of designs as "Flexity Outlook".

=== Eurotram ===
The Eurotram is an electric tramcar designed by for use on the network of the Compagnie de Transports Strasbourgeois (CTS). It was initially contracted to Socimi and ABB. After Socimi went bankrupt, the order for Eurotrams was completed by ABB Group. Later models were manufactured under successor companies Adtranz and Bombardier Inc. The Eurotram was ordered for use in two cities outside of Strasbourg: Porto and Milan.

When manufactured by Bombardier, the company marketed this type as Flexity Outlook (E), until it ceased production of this model in 2006.

=== Cityrunner ===
The more common Cityrunner, which has a more traditional tram design, is used by several cities, such as Innsbruck, Linz, and Graz (Austria); as well as Łódź (Poland); Geneva (Switzerland); Eskişehir (Turkey); Brussels (Belgium); Marseille (France); Valencia and Alicante (Spain); Palermo (Italy); and Toronto (Canada). Although the Toronto Transit Commission ordered the Flexity Outlook Cityrunner for its legacy tram system, Metrolinx ordered the Flexity Freedom for Toronto's Line 5 Eglinton.

While most Flexity Outlook trams are bi-directional, the Toronto cars are single-ended in order to meet the operating requirements of that city's legacy tram routes. Bombardier has built single-ended Flexity Outlook versions for cities including Graz, Łódź and Milan.

The Flexity Outlook Cityrunner has a modular design, allowing it to be customised for use on networks that require narrow vehicles or nearly unique tight curve radii, down to 10.973 metres (36 ft) in the case of Toronto. Toronto's version of the Outlook is gauged to fit its legacy tram lines, with a track gauge of 4 ft 10 7/8 in (1,495 mm).

Its closest competitors are the Citadis from Alstom, the Combino and S70 from Siemens, and Bombardier's other Flexity trams.

=== Olympic Line ===
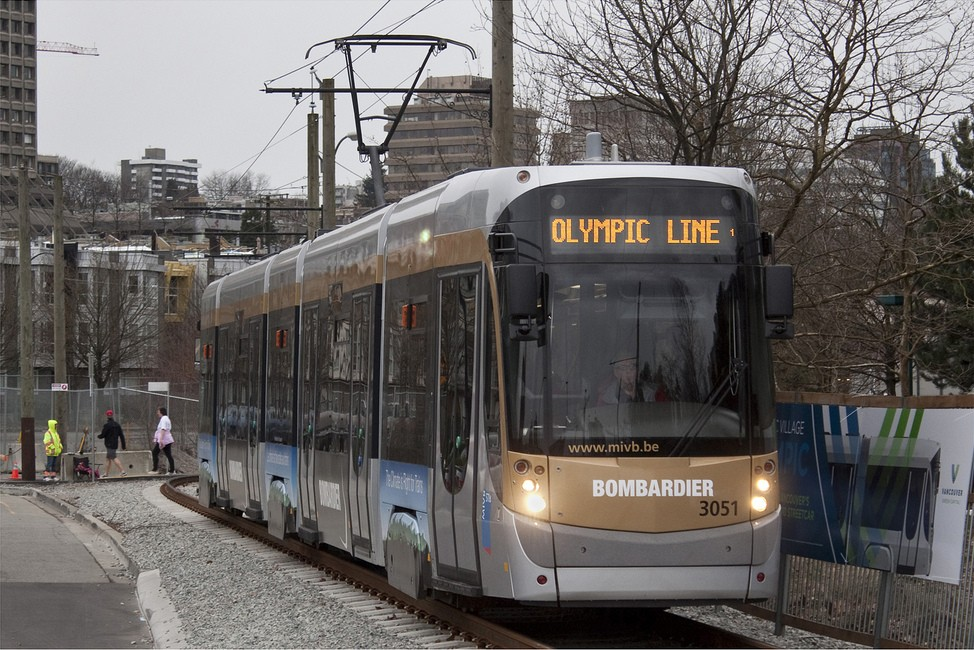
Brussels tram in Vancouver during the 2010 Winter Olympics

Bombardier Transportation operated a Flexity Outlook demo system in Vancouver from January 21 to March 21, 2010, coinciding with the 2010 Winter Olympics. The trams were on loan from a fleet of Flexity Outlook series made for the Brussels tram network. The service was called the Olympic Line and used an electrified railway right-of-way owned by the City of Vancouver and not part of the regional transit authority (TransLink).

The temporary line operated from Granville Island to near Olympic Village Station on the Canada Line at 2nd Avenue. Service consisted of a 1.8-kilometre (1.1 mi) link with two stations, with cars operating every 10 minutes.

== See also ==
- Bombardier T2000
