= Rue du Bailli =

Street in Brussels, Belgium

Rue du Bailli (French); Baljuwstraat (Dutch)
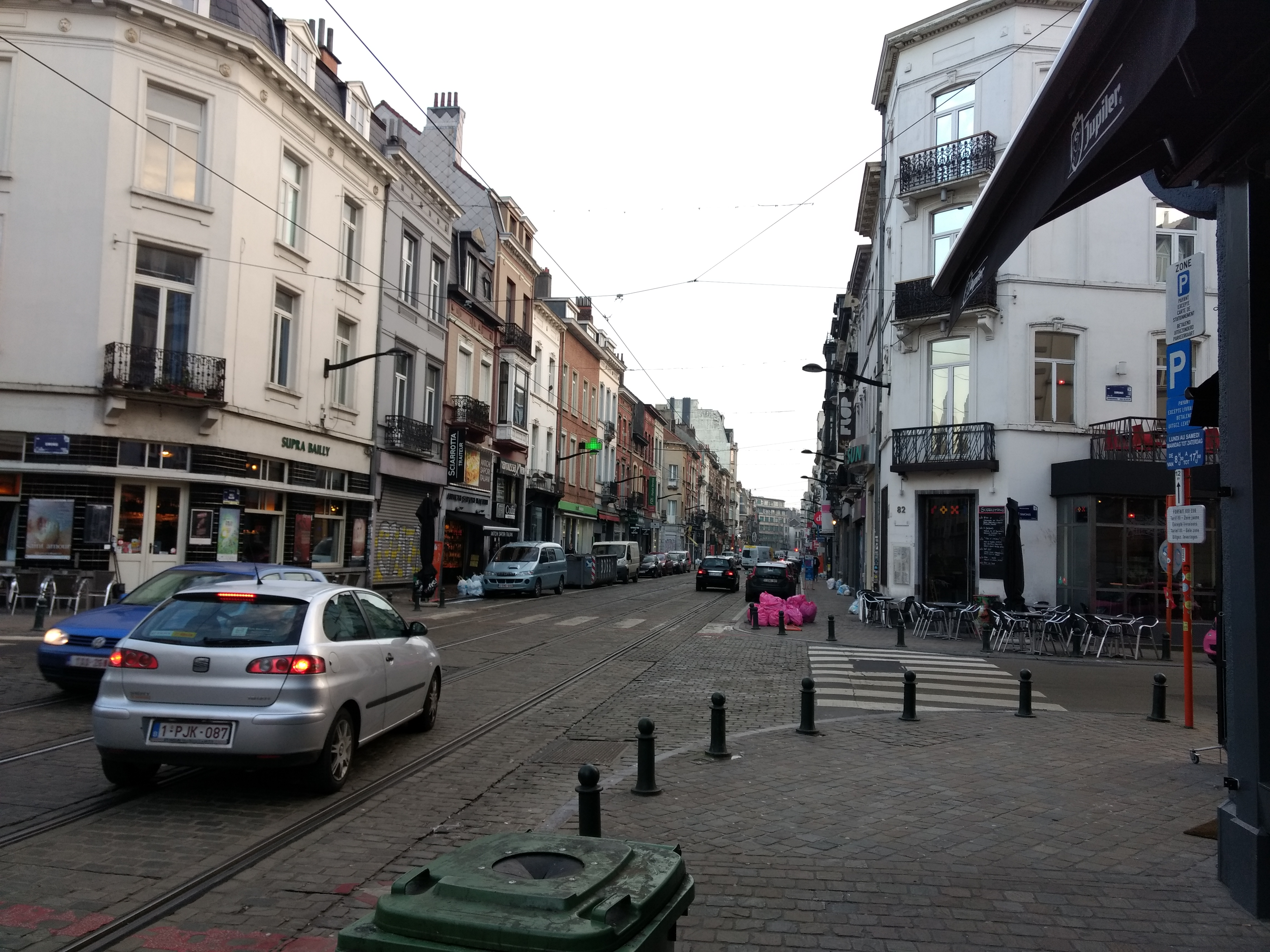
- The crossroad between the Rue du Bailli/Baljuwstraat and the Rue Simonis/Simonisstraat

- Location within Brussels Location within Belgium
- Type: Street
- Location: City of Brussels and Ixelles, Brussels-Capital Region, Belgium
- Postal code: 1000, 1050
- Coordinates: 50°49′35″N 4°21′40″E

The Rue du Bailli (French, pronounced [ʁy dy baji]) or Baljuwstraat (Dutch, pronounced [ˈbɑl.jyuˌstraːt]), meaning "Bailiff Street", is a shopping street in Brussels, Belgium, running through the municipalities of Ixelles and the City of Brussels. It runs from the Avenue Louise/Louizalaan to La Trinité, via the Rue de Livourne/Livornostraat, the Rue Faider/Faiderstraat and the Rue Simonis/Simonisstraat.

== See also ==
- List of streets in Brussels
- History of Brussels
- Belgium in the long nineteenth century
