= Aux Marocains =

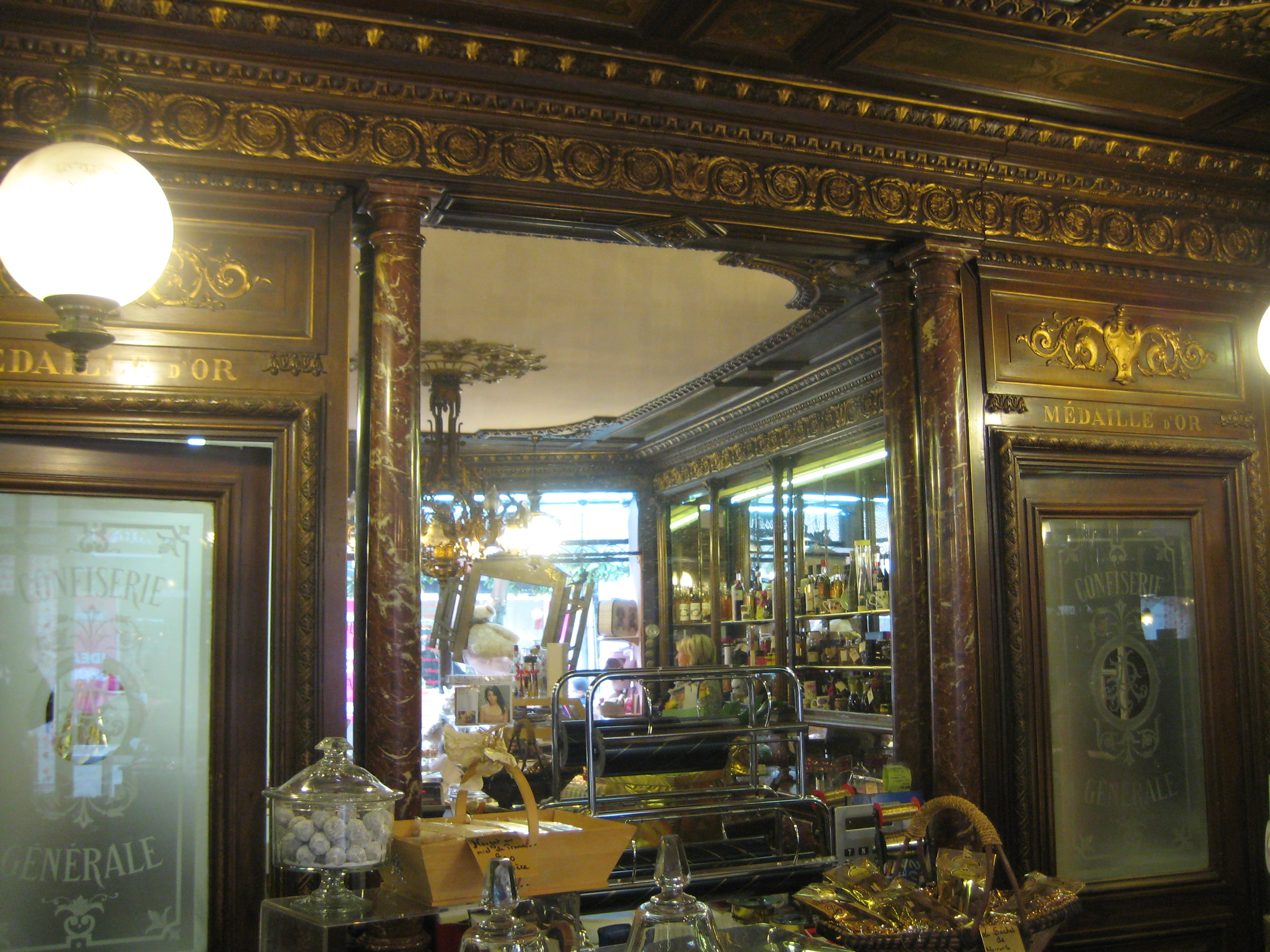
- Interactive map of the Aux Marocains area
- Former names: Confiserie Générale A P

General information
- Type: Confectionery
- Architectural style: Second Empire
- Location: Vichy, Département of Allier, France, 33 rue Georges Clemenceau
- Coordinates: 46.12579°N 3.42259°E
- Opened: 1860
- Owner: M. & Ms Diot

Website
- Official site of Aux Marocains (in French)

Aux Marocains is a confectionery, located 33 rue Clemenceau in the French spa city of Vichy in the Département of Allier, in center of France. Established in 1860, it is still active. Its name come from a candy — Le Marocain (The Marocan) — that was created there in the early 20th century and is still produced, a variant of another candy, the Négus de Nevers. The facade of the building, the storefront (Art Deco) and the interior of the shop (Second Empire-style) are listed on the Supplementary Inventory of Monument historique since 1990.

== Photo gallery ==
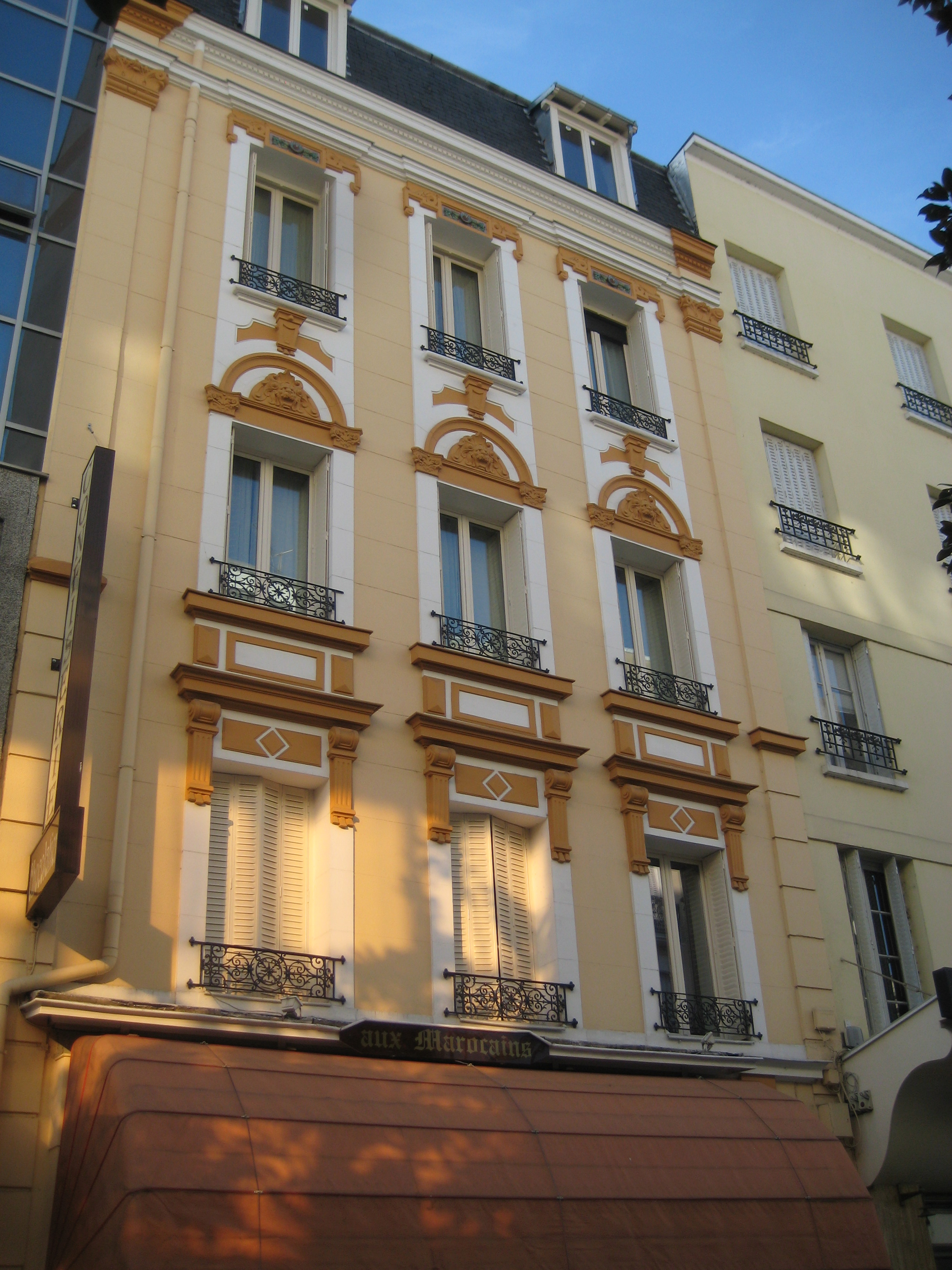
Building in 33 rue Clemenceau with Aux Marocains shop on the ground level.

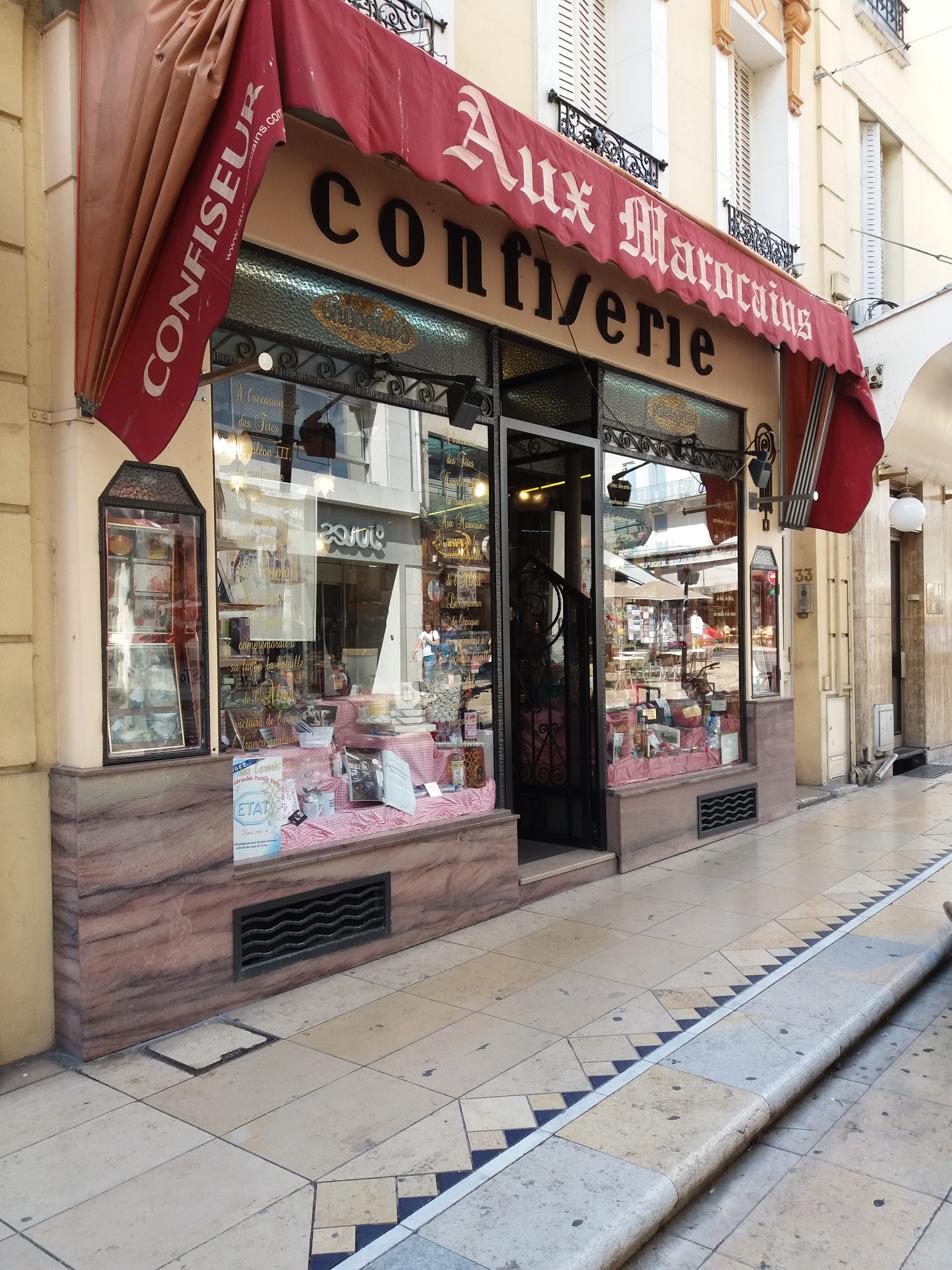
The Art Deco facade of the boutique

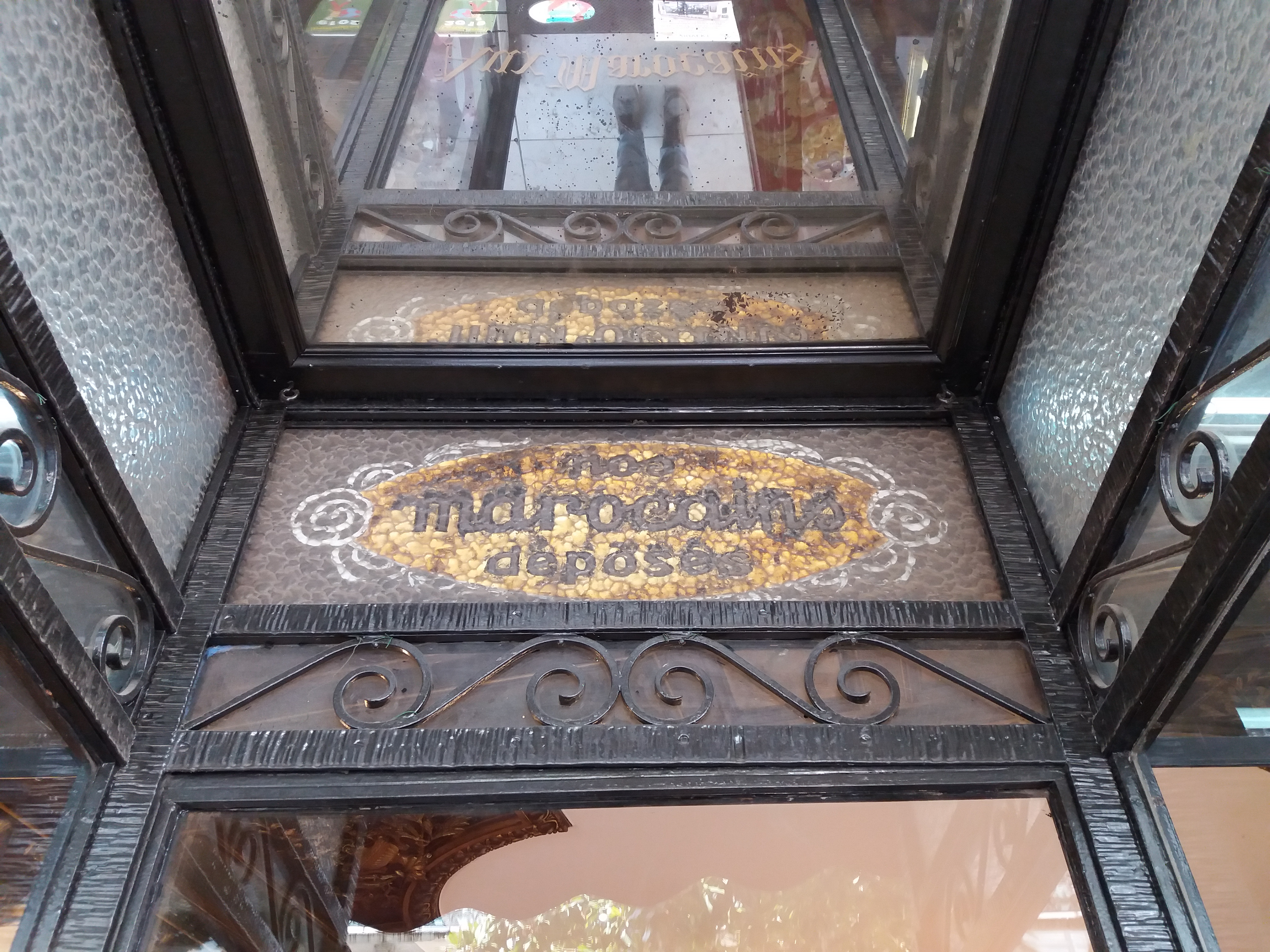
Over the front door Nos Marocains déposés ("Our Marocains, a registered trademark")

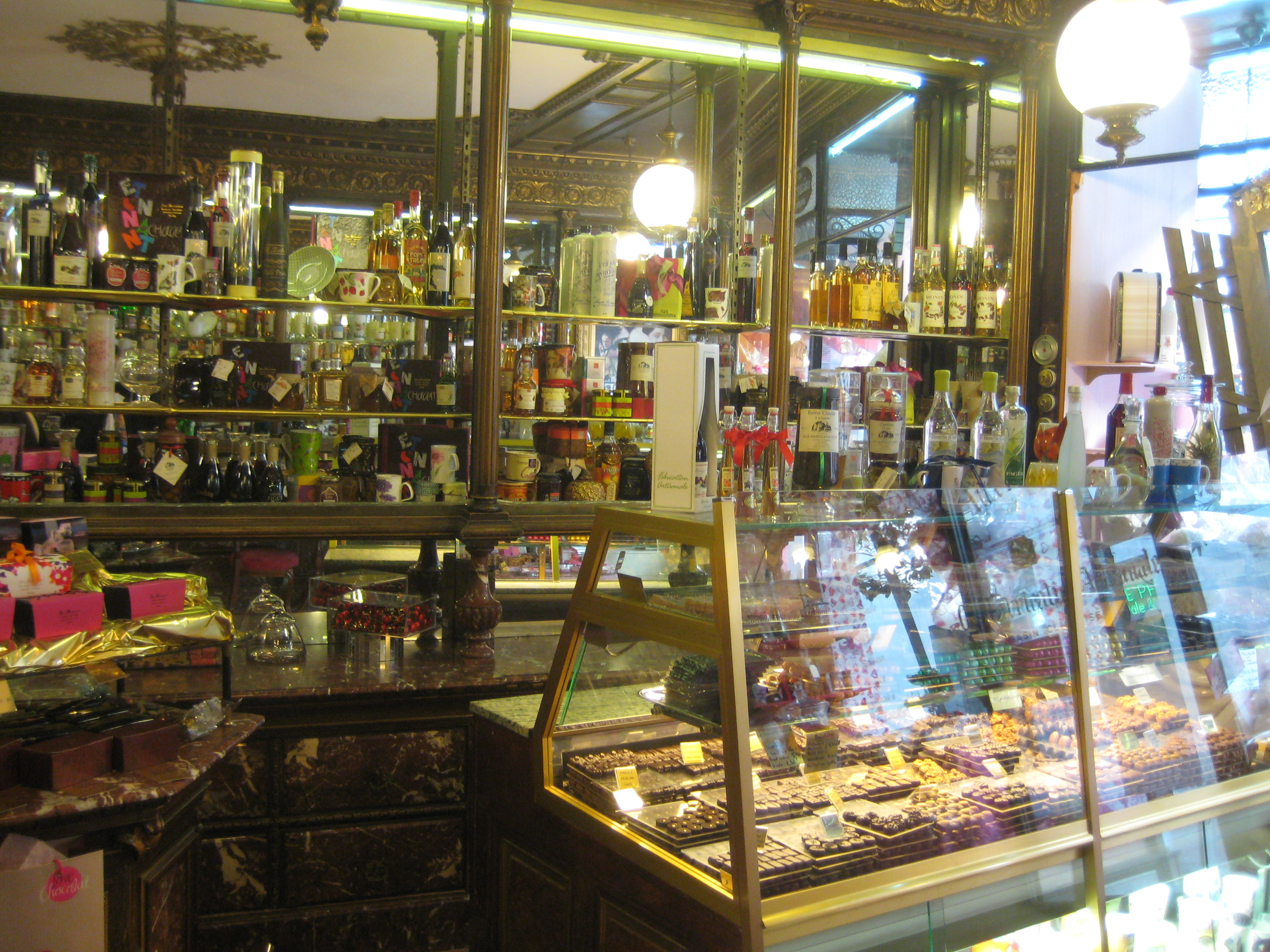
Inside the confectionery
