= Central Boulevards of Brussels =

Thoroughfares in Brussels, Belgium

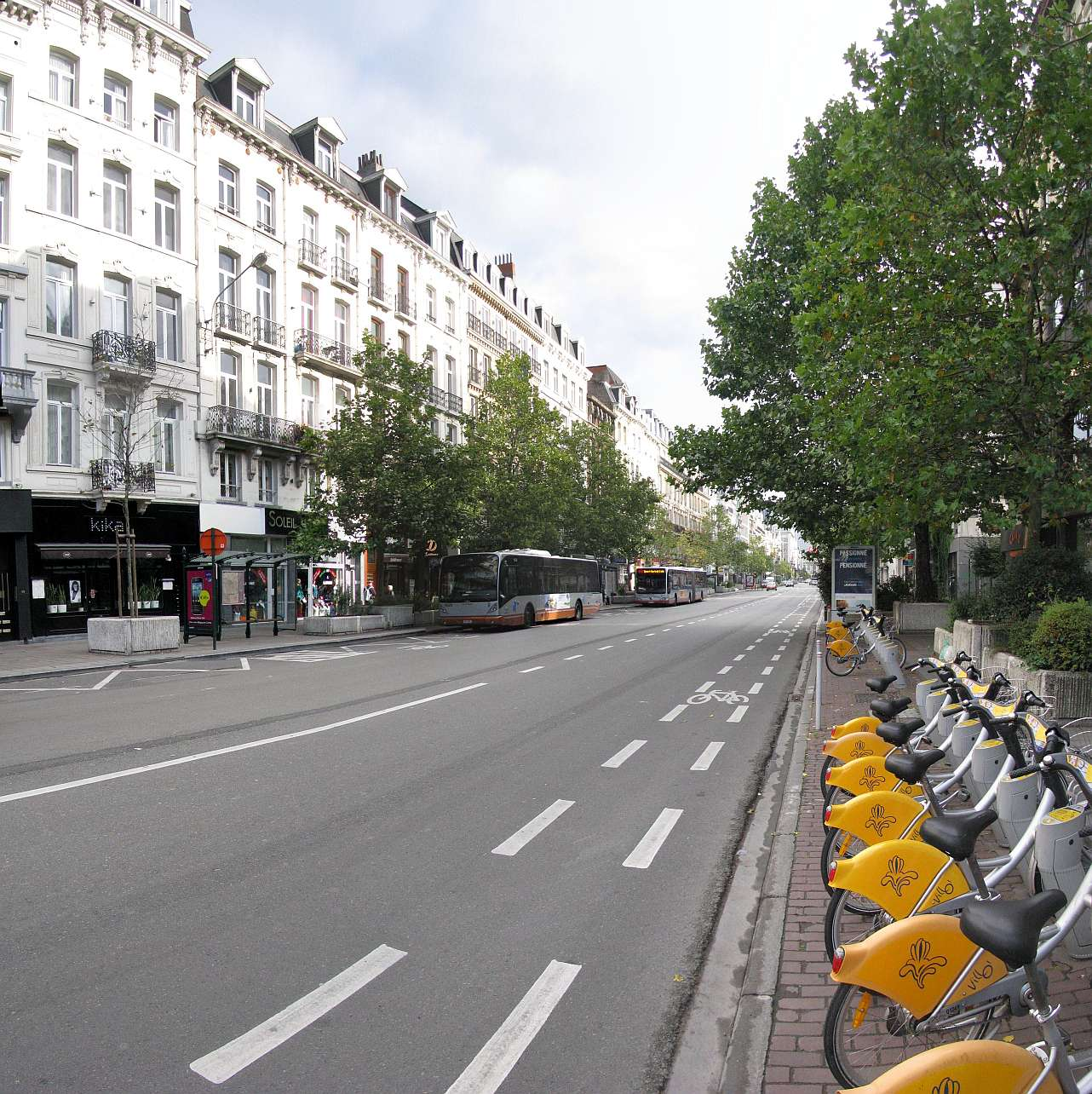
Looking upwards the Boulevard Anspach/Anspachlaan near the Place Fontainas/Fontainasplein

The Central Boulevards (French: Boulevards du Centre; Dutch: Centrale Lanen) are a series of grand boulevards in central Brussels, Belgium. They were constructed following the covering of the river Senne (1867–1871), as part of the major urban works by the architect Léon Suys under the tenure of the city's then-mayor, Jules Anspach. They are from south to north and from west to east: the Boulevard Maurice Lemonnier/Maurice Lemonnierlaan, the Boulevard Anspach/Anspachlaan, the Boulevard Adolphe Max/Adolphe Maxlaan, and the Boulevard Émile Jacqmain/Émile Jacqmainlaan. The latter two branch off from the Place de Brouckère/De Brouckèreplein. Other major squares on the Central Boulevards are the Place de la Bourse/Beursplein, the Place Fontainas/Fontainasplein and the Place Anneessens/Anneessensplein.

The covering of the Senne and the completion of the Central Boulevards allowed the construction of the modern buildings that are focal to downtown Brussels today. The wide, straight boulevards were lined with stately Haussmann-esque buildings, housing prestigious apartments that were among the country's first. Architectural quality was stimulated by two architectural competitions. Public buildings such as the Bourse Palace, the South Palace, and the (now demolished) Central Halls, were also built on the boulevards. By 1895, continuous construction had been realised in an eclectic array of styles.

In the 20th century, especially following the 1958 Brussels World's Fair (Expo 58), the Central Boulevards evolved into an axis for motorised traffic. In 1976, tram traffic was brought underground by the opening of the North–South Axis. The idea of an urban motorway was ultimately abandoned following "protest picnics" in 2012, and since 2015, the central part of the boulevards has been pedestrianised.

== History ==
=== Origins: covering of the Senne ===
The 1837 course of the Senne superimposed on the modern city

The Senne/Zenne (French/Dutch) was historically the main waterway of Brussels, but it became more polluted and less navigable as the city grew. By the second half of the 19th century, it had become a serious health hazard and was filled with garbage and decaying organic matter. It was heavily polluted, and it flooded frequently, inundating the lower town and the working class neighbourhoods that surrounded it.

Numerous proposals were made to remedy this problem, and in 1865, the City of Brussels' then-mayor, Jules Anspach, selected a design by the architect Léon Suys to cover the river and build a series of grand boulevards and public buildings. The project faced fierce opposition and controversy, mostly due to its cost and the need for expropriation and demolition of working-class neighbourhoods. The construction was contracted to a British company, but control was returned to the government following an embezzlement scandal. This delayed the project, but it was still completed in 1871.

The covering of the Senne brought boulevards to the heart of Brussels, whereas they had hitherto been limited to the Small Ring, a series of roadways built on the site of the 14th-century walls bounding the historic city centre. The boulevards, whose initial function was to go around the capital, thus became structural urban thoroughfares. The central boulevards' completion also allowed urban renewal and the construction along them of the modern buildings of Haussmann-esque style, which are characteristic of downtown Brussels today.

=== Construction and development ===
The Central Boulevards—the Boulevard du Hainaut/Henegouwenlaan (now the Boulevard Maurice Lemonnier/Maurice Lemonnierlaan), the Boulevard Central/Centraallaan (now the Boulevard Anspach/Anspachlaan), the Boulevard du Nord/Noordlaan (now the Boulevard Adolphe Max/Adolphe Maxlaan), and the Boulevard de la Senne/Zennelaan (now the Boulevard Émile Jacqmain/Émile Jacqmainlaan)—were laid out between 1869 and 1871, and were progressively opened to traffic from 1871 to 1873. The opening of these new routes offered a more efficient way to get into Brussels' lower town than the cramped streets such as the Rue du Midi/Zuidstraat, the Rue des Fripiers/Kleerkopersstraat and the Rue Neuve/Nieuwstraat, and helped revitalise the town's lower quarters.

In order to accomplish this revitalisation and attract investment, public buildings were constructed as part of Léon Suys' massive programme of beautification of the city centre, including the Bourse Palace (1868–1873). The vast Central Halls (French: Halles Centrales, Dutch: Centrale Hallen), a notable example of metallic architecture, located between the Rue des Halles/Hallenstraat and the Rue de la Vierge Noire/Zwarte Lievevrouwstraat, replaced unhygienic open-air markets, though they were torn down in 1958. The monumental fountain at the Place Fontainas/Fontainasplein, which was to break the boulevards' uniformity, was abandoned for budgetary reasons.

The construction of private buildings on the boulevards and surrounding areas took place later. Brussels' middle class continued to prefer living in new suburbs rather than the cramped areas of the city centre. Besides, the high prices of the land (expected to finance part of the construction costs) and the high rents were not within the means of the lower classes. Moreover, life in apartments was no longer desirable for residents of Brussels, who preferred to live in single family homes. For these reasons, the buildings constructed by private citizens had difficulty finding buyers.

To give builders an incentive to create elaborate and appealing façades on their works, two architectural competitions were organised, first in the period 1872–1876 and again in 1876–1878. Great freedom was given to the architects; no unity of style was sought nor imposed (other than a minimum height of 15 metres (49 ft) to avoid speculation) and the monumental composition adopted a de facto eclectic approach throughout the immense perspective of the boulevards. The first prize of 20,000 Belgian francs for the 1872–1876 competition was awarded to the architect Henri Beyaert who designed the Maison des Chats or Hier is't in den kater en de kat (loosely, "House of Cats") on the Boulevard du Nord. Nonetheless, it took another twenty years, until 1895, for buildings to solidly line the boulevards.

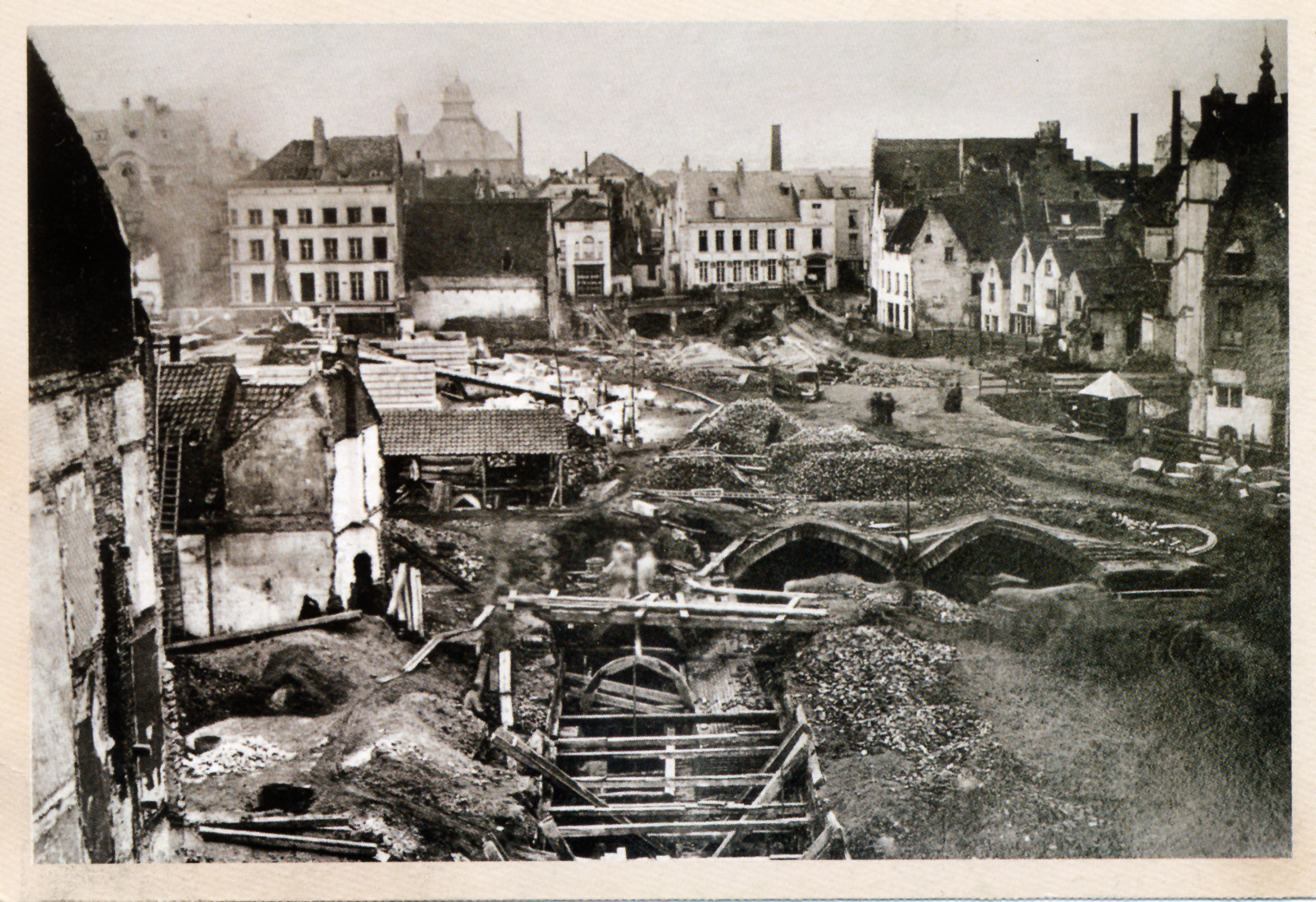
Destruction of the old neighbourhood and beginning of the vaulting in 1867

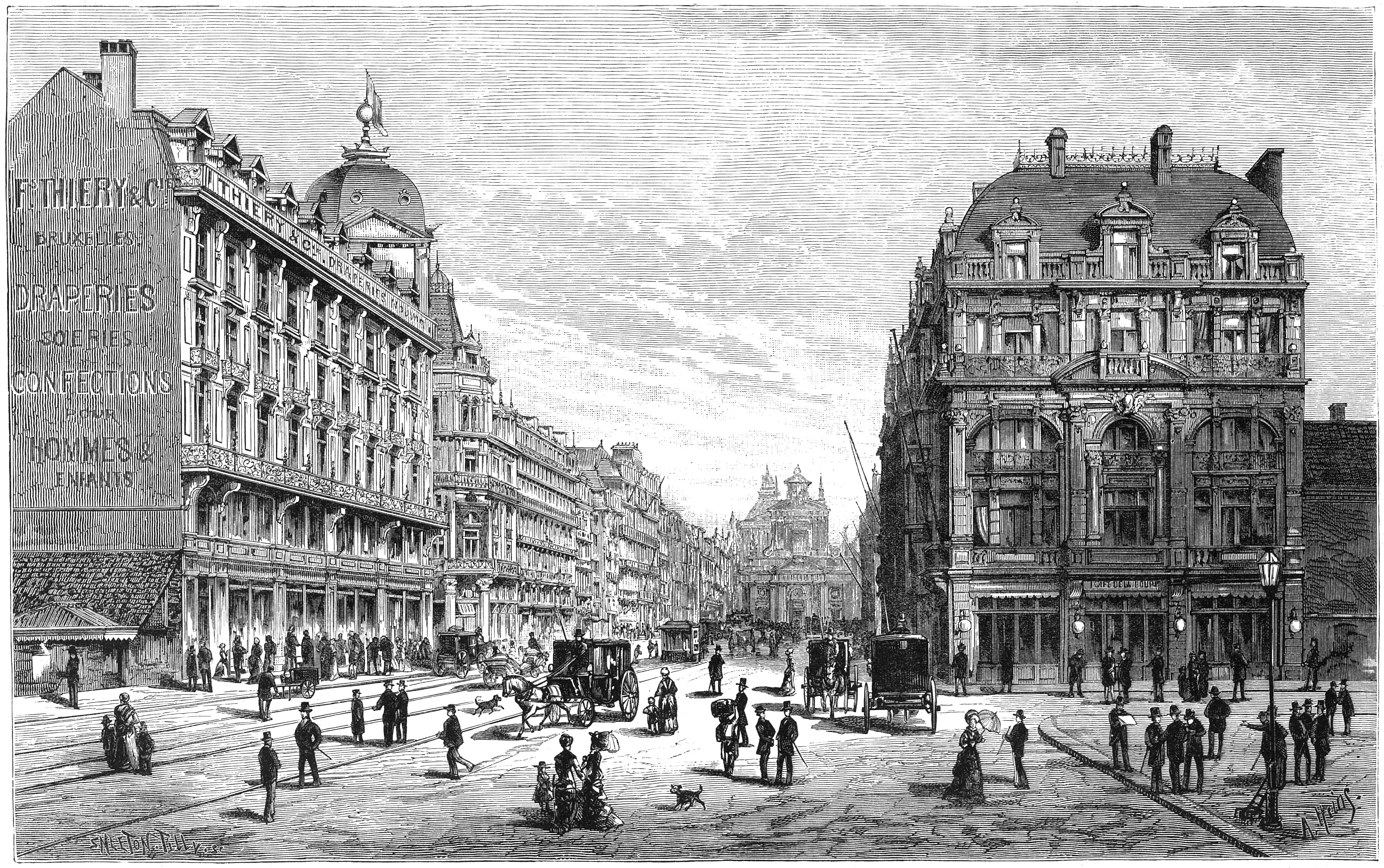
The Boulevard Anspach/Anspachlaan in 1880, etching by Armand Heins from L'Illustration nationale

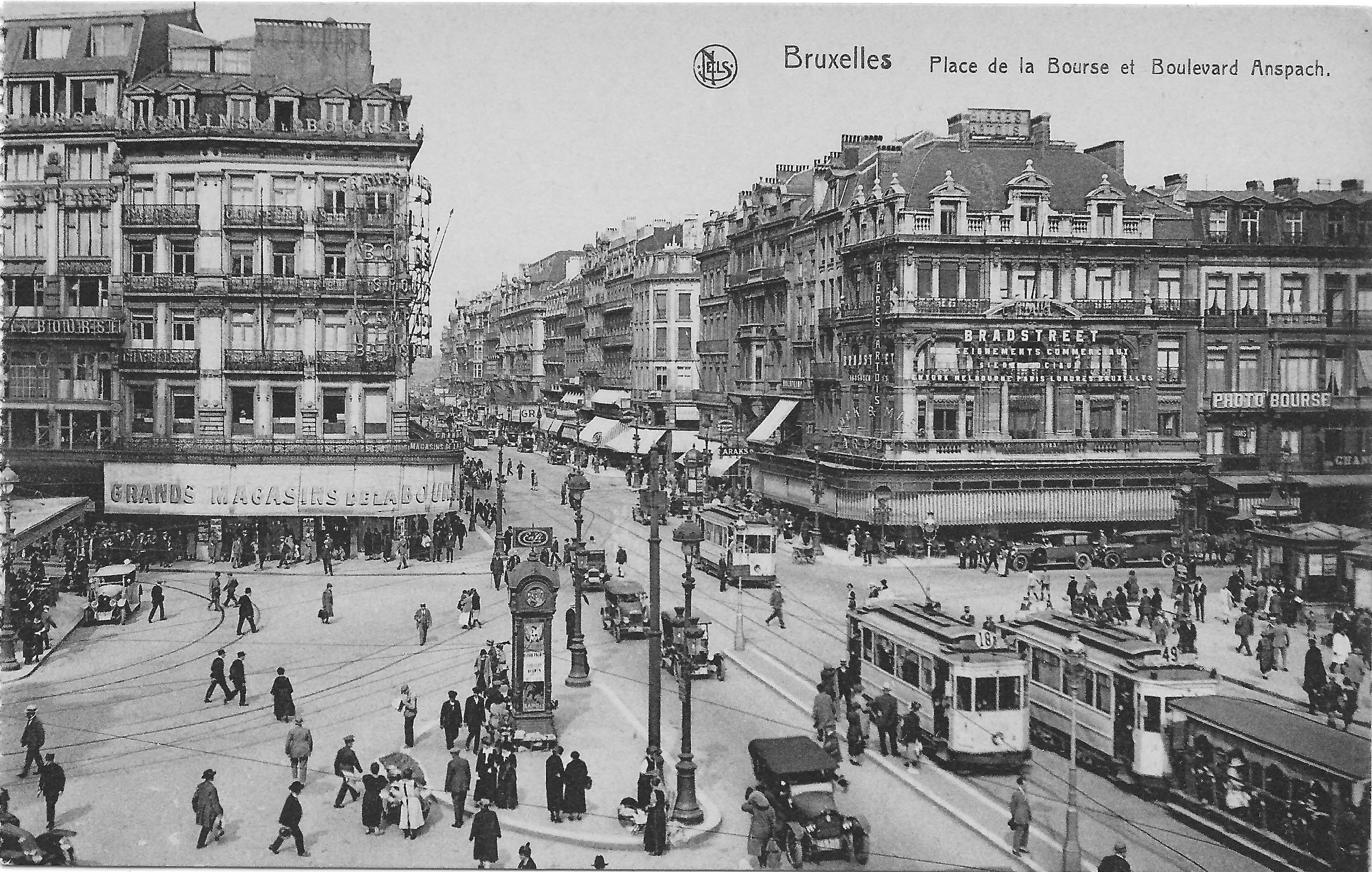
The Place de la Bourse/Beursplein and the Boulevard Anspach in the 1920s

=== Contemporary (1945–present) ===
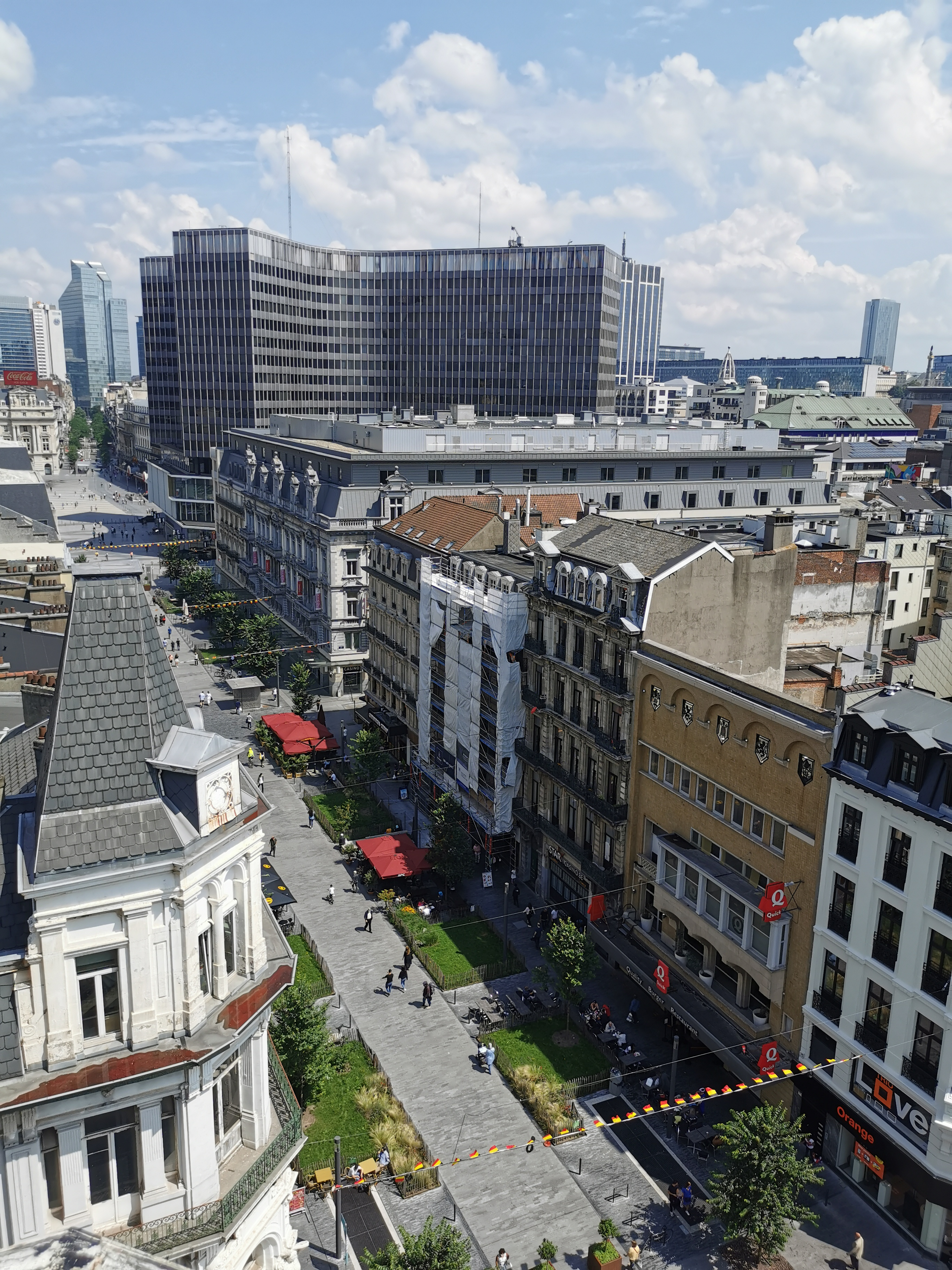
View on the Boulevard Anspach towards the Place de Brouckère/De Brouckèreplein from the former Actiris building

The covering of the Senne and the construction of the Central Boulevards have left deep traces in Brussels' historic centre. The formerly working-class districts have made way for apartment buildings and for the Stock Exchange with its commercial district, department stores, luxury hotels, concert halls, cafés and brasseries. From the end of the Second World War until the late 1970s, especially following the 1958 Brussels World's Fair (Expo 58), the Central Boulevards were subject to urban planners' failed attempts to transform them into urban motorways (see Brusselisation). In 1976, tram traffic was brought underground by the opening of the North–South Axis. In spite of this, the boulevards have mostly retained their 19th-century appearance to this day.

In June 2012, "protest picnics" were held on the Boulevard Anspach to express dissatisfaction with the City of Brussels' mobility policy. Following these events, the city's then-mayor, Freddy Thielemans, decided to make the boulevard car-free every Sunday afternoon for the entire summer. His successor, Yvan Mayeur, wished to expand the Boulevard Anspach into a permanent pedestrian zone with a new street cover, equipped with fountains, works of art, benches and trees. On 29 June 2015, the boulevards finally became completely car-free between the Place de la Bourse/Beursplein and the Place de Brouckère/De Brouckèreplein, as part of a broader pedestrianisation of Brussels' city centre (French: Le Piétonnier). The area, covering 50 hectares (120 acres), includes much of the historic centre within the Small Ring, such as the Grand-Place/Grote Markt, the Place de Brouckère and the Boulevard Anspach.

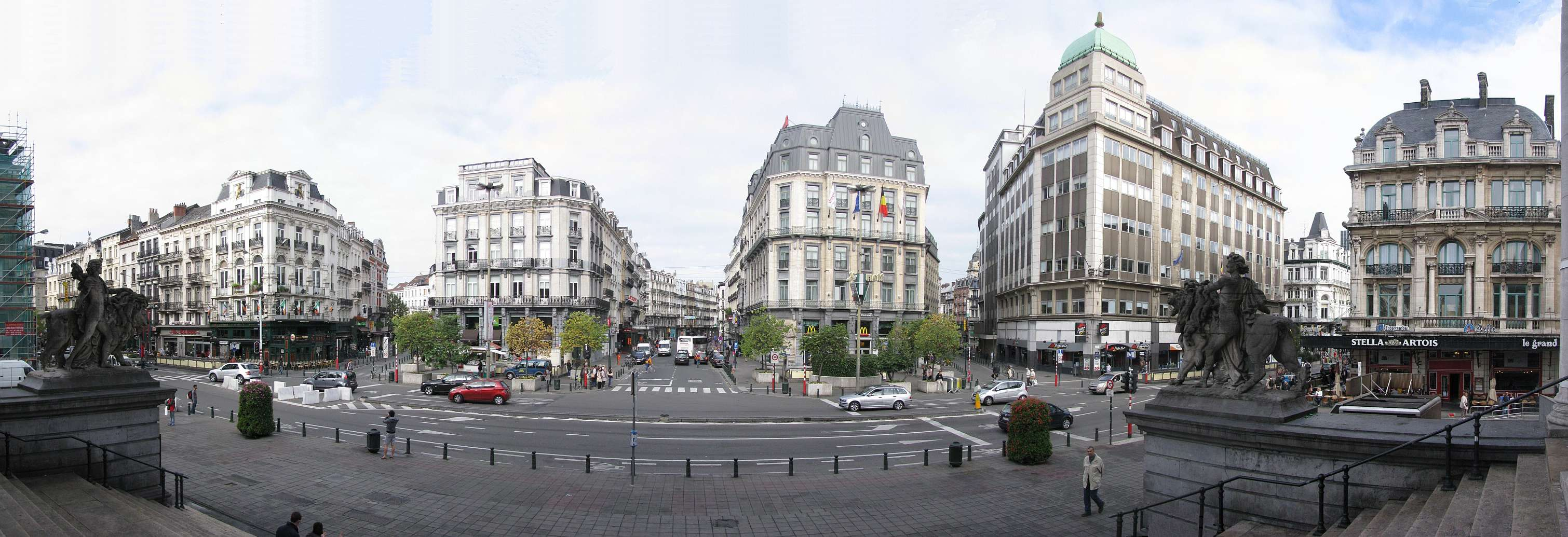
The Place de la Bourse in 2012, before pedestrianisation

== The boulevards ==
=== Boulevard Maurice Lemonnier ===
Formerly named the Boulevard du Hainaut/Henegouwenlaan, the Boulevard Maurice Lemonnier/Maurice Lemonnierlaan stretches from the Boulevard du Midi/Zuidlaan to the Place Fontainas/Fontainasplein. Interrupted halfway by the Place Anneessens/Anneessensplein (former location of the Old Market), this artery is characterised by a homogeneous succession of low-rise buildings for the most part, bourgeois dwellings with a predilection for the neoclassical style, apartment buildings, and commercial buildings such as the South Palace. In 1919, the city council ordered the boulevard to be renamed in honour of the alderman and patriot Maurice Lemonnier (1860–1930), who returned from a long captivity as a prisoner in Germany during World War I. Some remarkable buildings along this relatively well-preserved stretch include the South Palace, the Model School (currently Charles Buls Primary School), the former Municipal School no. 13 (currently the Haute École Francisco Ferrer) on the Place Anneessens, as well as the old Castellani rotunda (now transformed into a parking lot).

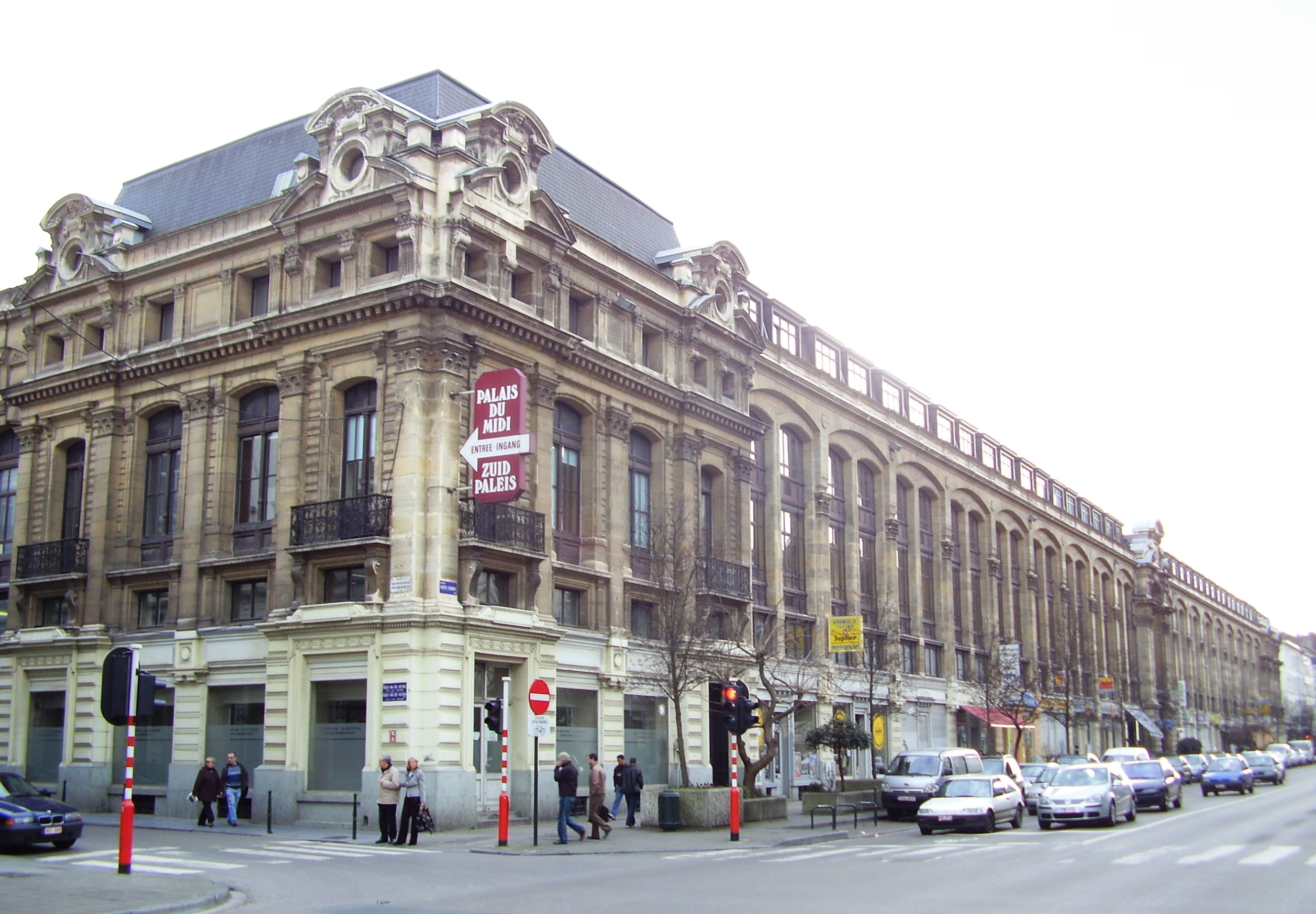
South Palace on the Boulevard Maurice Lemonnier/Maurice Lemonnierlaan

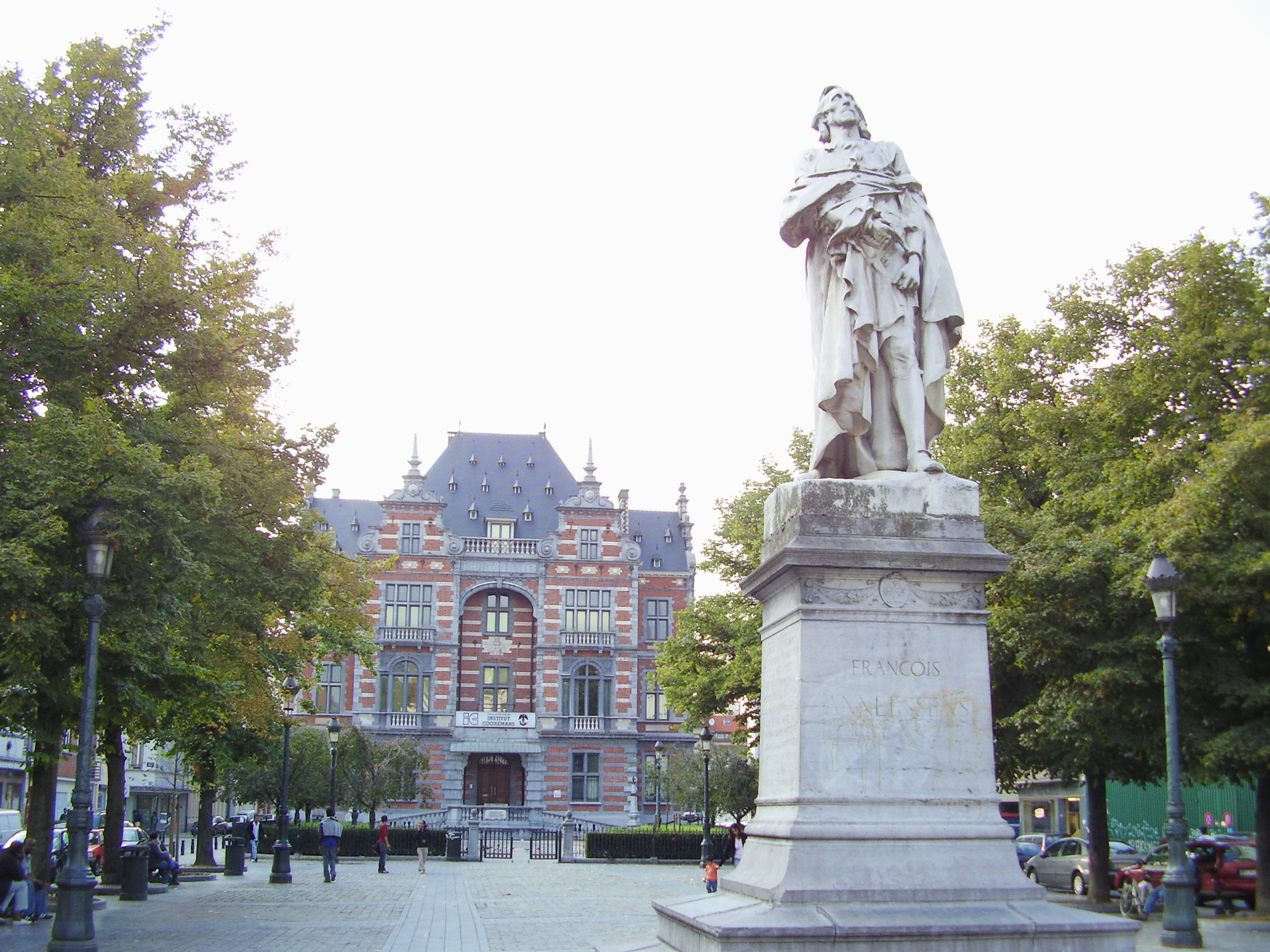
Place Anneessens/Anneessensplein (François Anneessens) and Haute École Francisco Ferrer

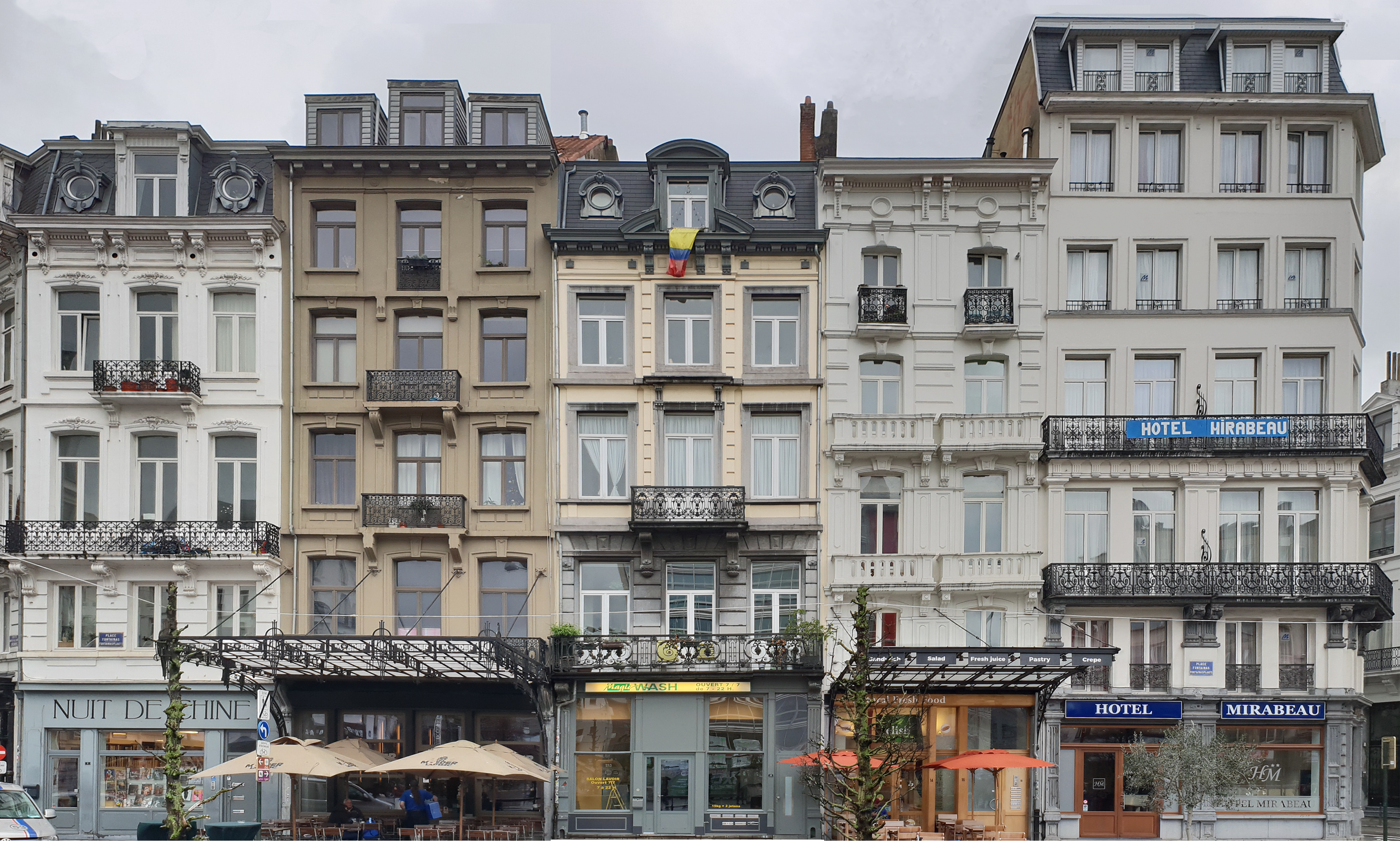
Place Fontainas/Fontainasplein

=== Boulevard Anspach ===
Central by its original name as much as by its location, the Boulevard Anspach/Anspachlaan connects the Place Fontainas to the Place de Brouckère. In 1879, it was renamed in honour of Jules Anspach (1829–1879), the former mayor of the City of Brussels who instigated these works. Among the most important buildings on the Central Boulevards are concentrated there: the Bourse Palace, major shops and entertainment venues, and formerly markets and department stores (Grand Bazar Anspach and Grands Magasins de la Bourse). Large buildings, several of which bear the signature of the French promoter Mosnier, are adjacent to hotels (Grand Hotel and Hotel Central), cafés, cinemas, theatres, and concert halls (Pathé Palace cinema, Bourse Theatre and Ancienne Belgique). Some remarkable buildings on this section include the former Stock Exchange on the Place de la Bourse, as well as Anspach Gallery.

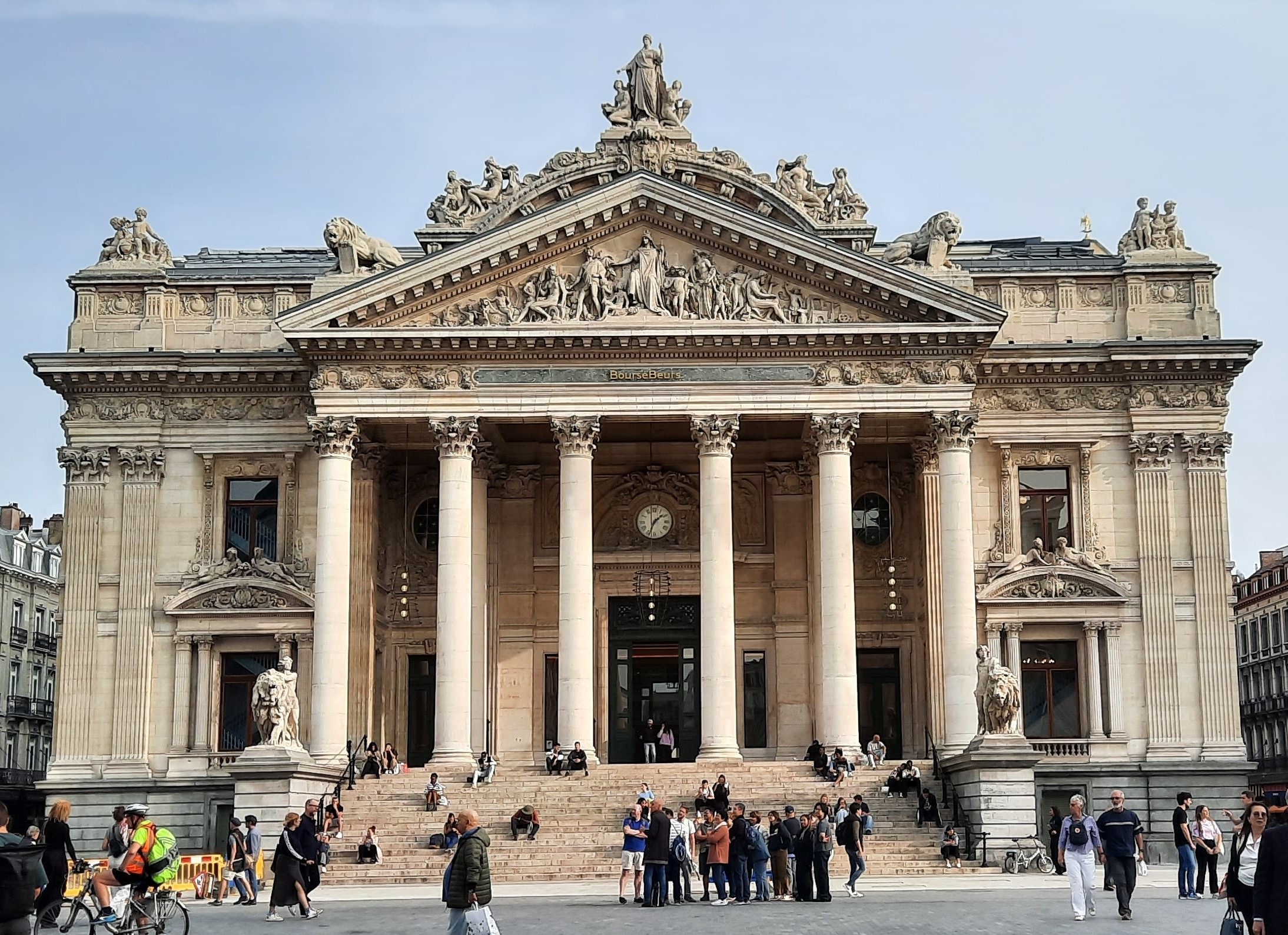
Bourse Palace on the Place de la Bourse/Beursplein

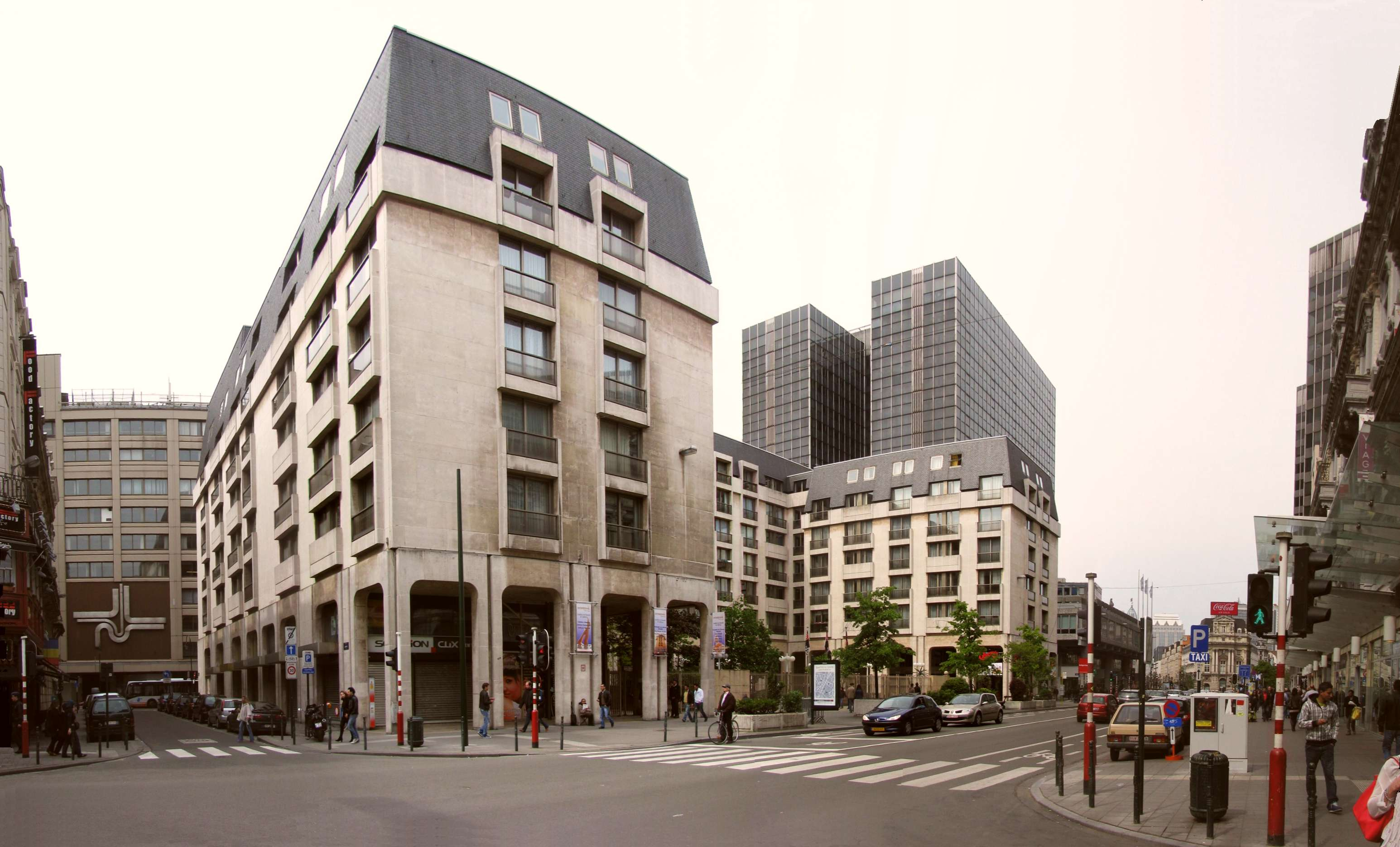
Boulevard Anspach/Anspachlaan towards the Place de Brouckère/De Brouckèreplein

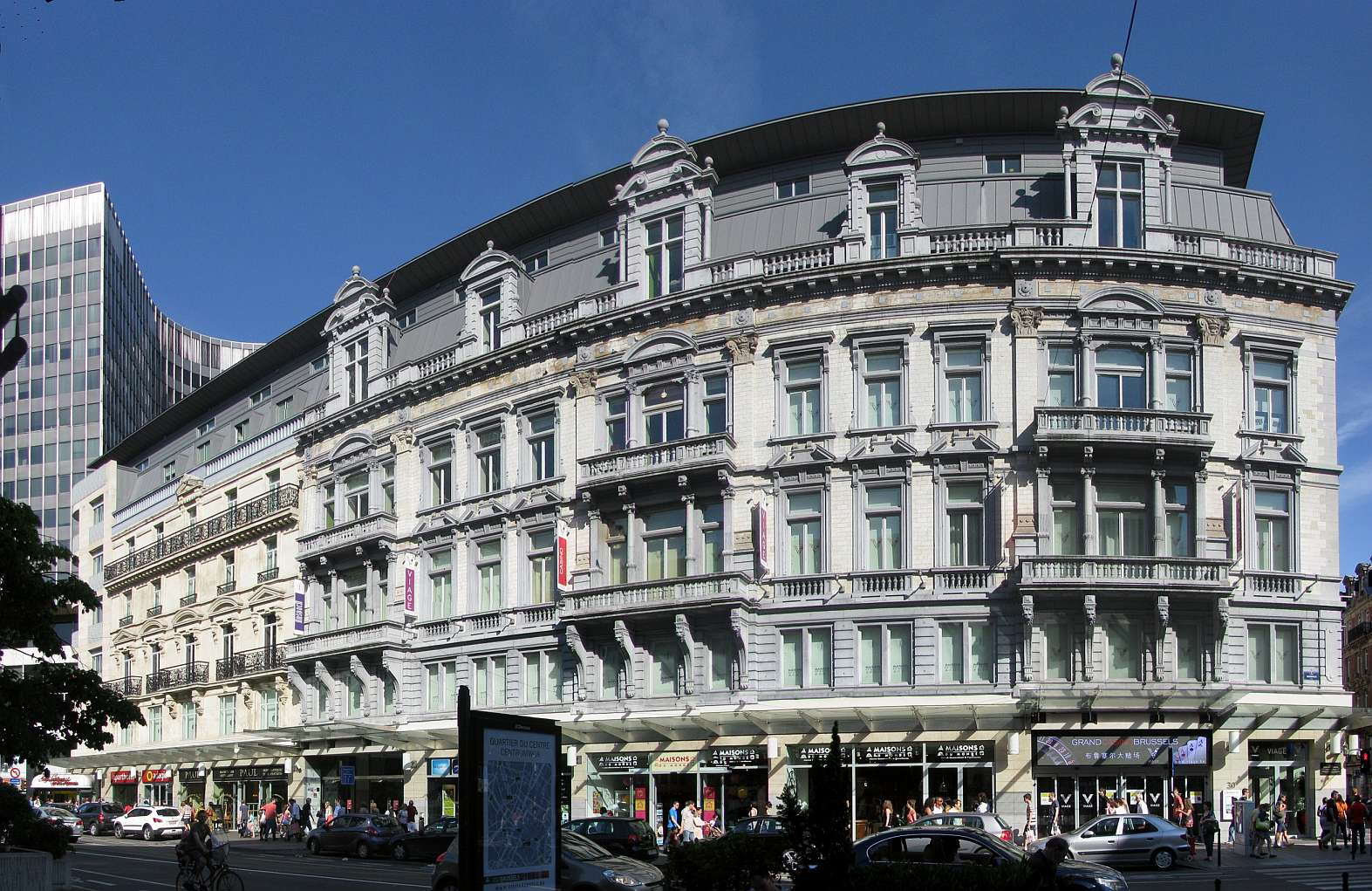
Anspach Gallery on the Boulevard Anspach

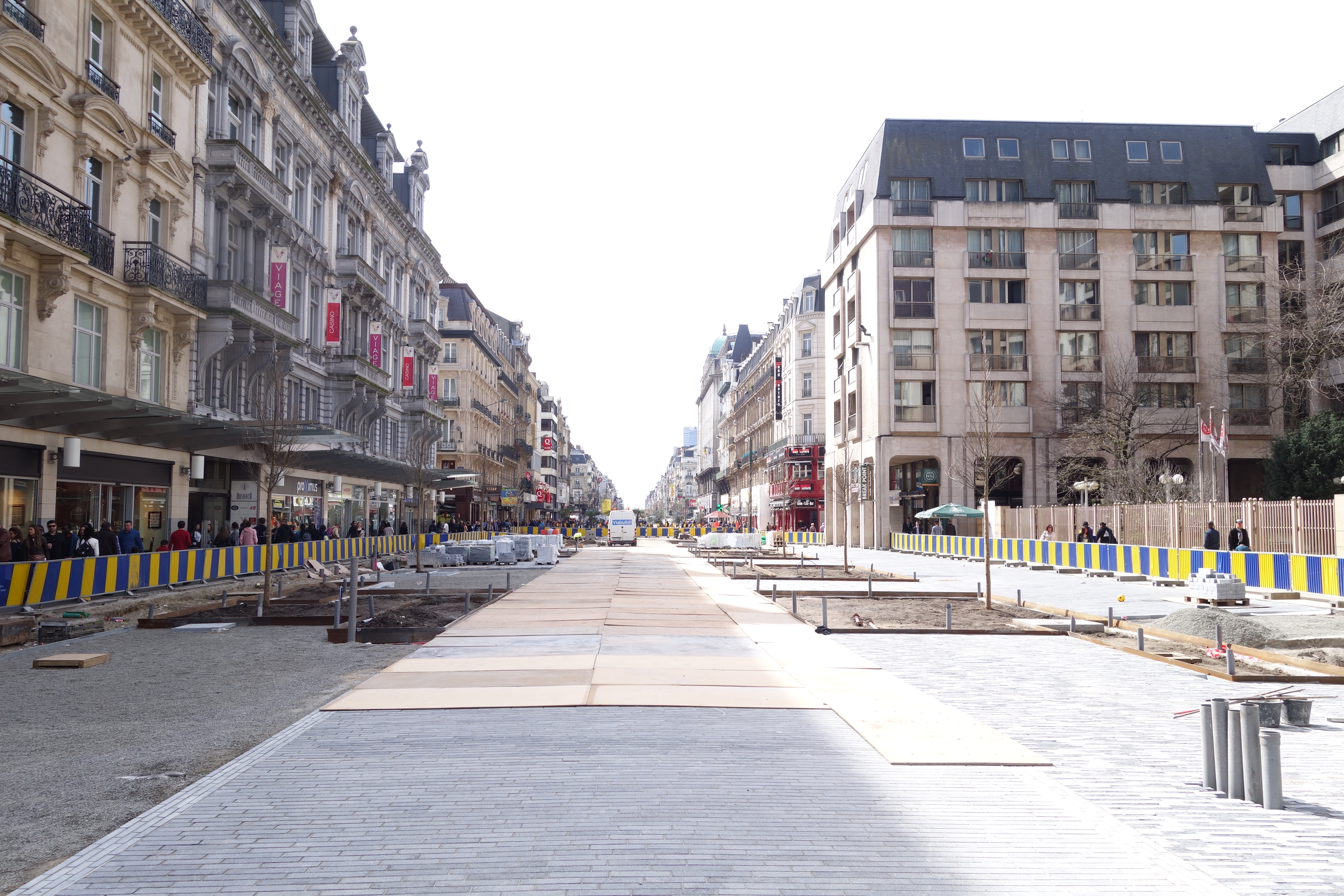
Boulevard Anspach

=== Boulevard Adolphe Max ===
Unlike the other sections of the Central Boulevards, the Boulevard Adolphe Max/Adolphe Maxlaan (formerly the Boulevard du Nord/Noordlaan) does not cover the Senne. It doubles with the Boulevard Émile Jacqmain/Émile Jacqmainlaan and connects the Place de Brouckère to the Boulevard du Jardin botanique/Kruidtuinlaan and the Place Charles Rogier/Karel Rogierplein, forming a "Y" crossroad with the Boulevard Émile Jacqmain. It is characterised by five-level buildings on average, monumental in appearance for the most part. A dozen of them belong to the Haussmann-esque vein in the Second Empire style. Others, of neoclassical inspiration, are distinguished by the decoration of their balconies, windows, and pediments. In 1919, it was renamed in honour of the then-mayor of the City of Brussels, Adolphe Max (1869–1939). Remarkable buildings on this stretch include the House of Cats, the entrance of the Northern Gallery glazed shopping arcade, as well as the luxurious Hotel Le Plaza and Hotel Atlanta.

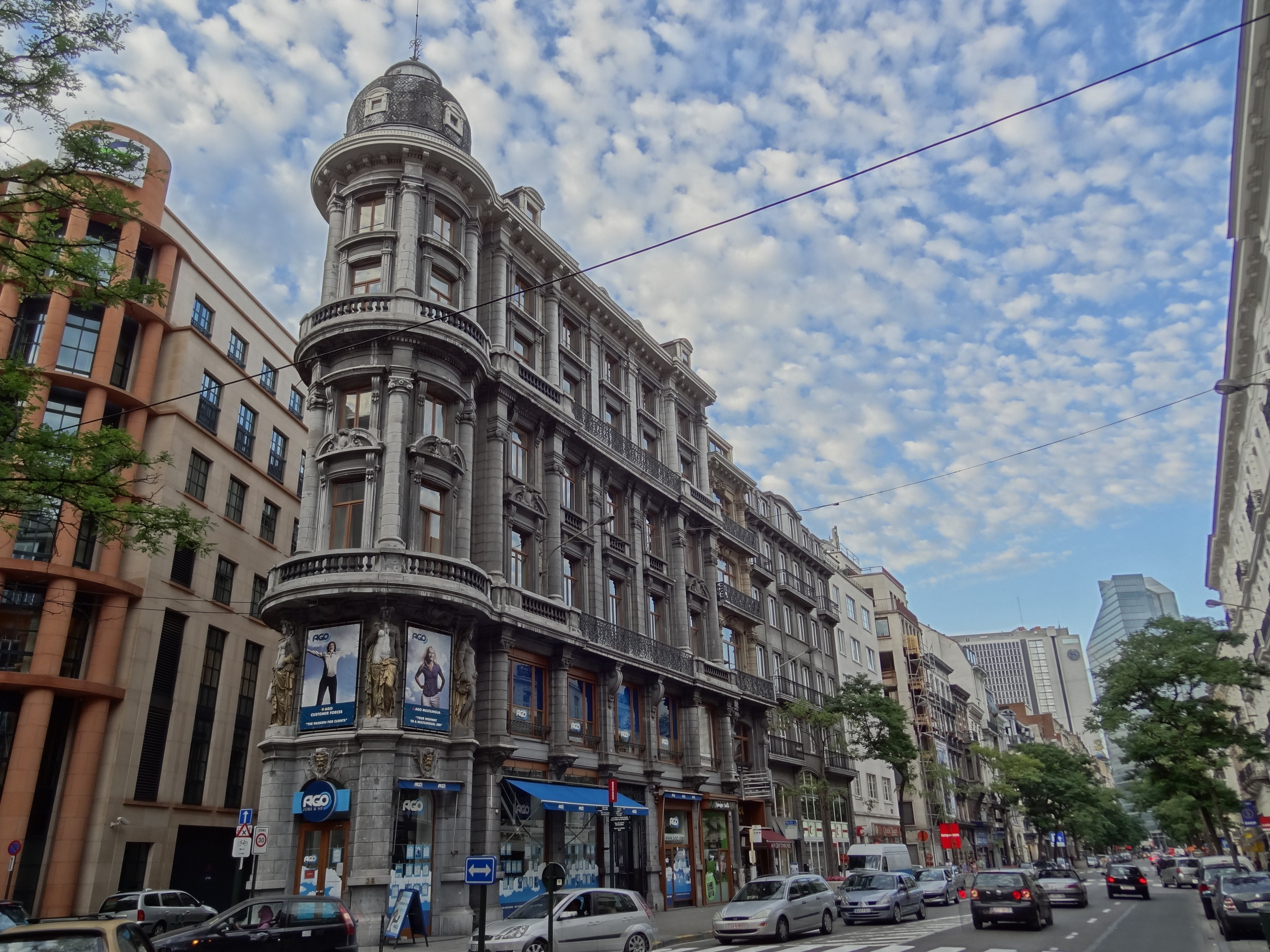
Le Printemps building on the Boulevard Adolphe Max/Adolphe Maxlaan

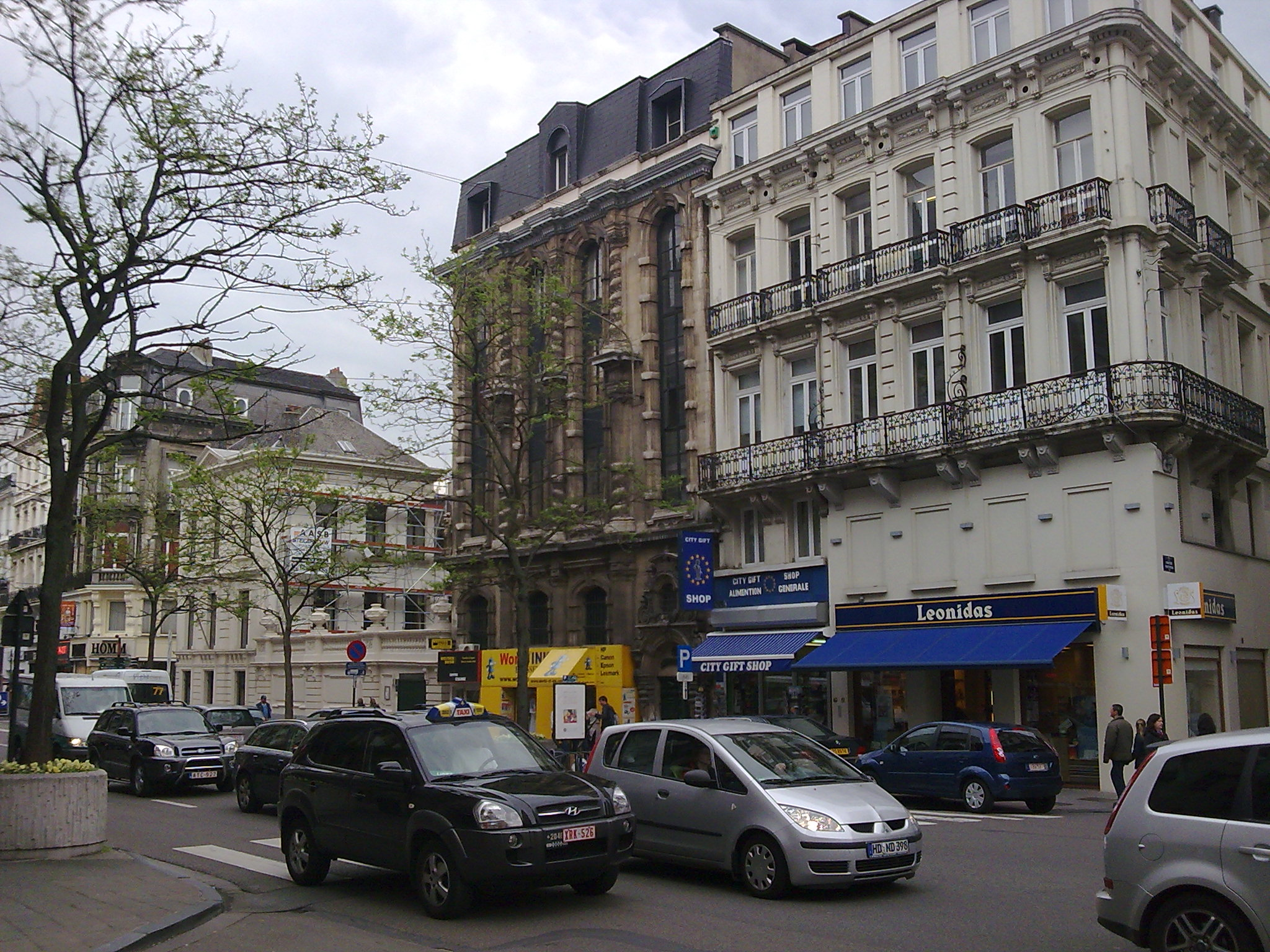
Boulevard Adolphe Max

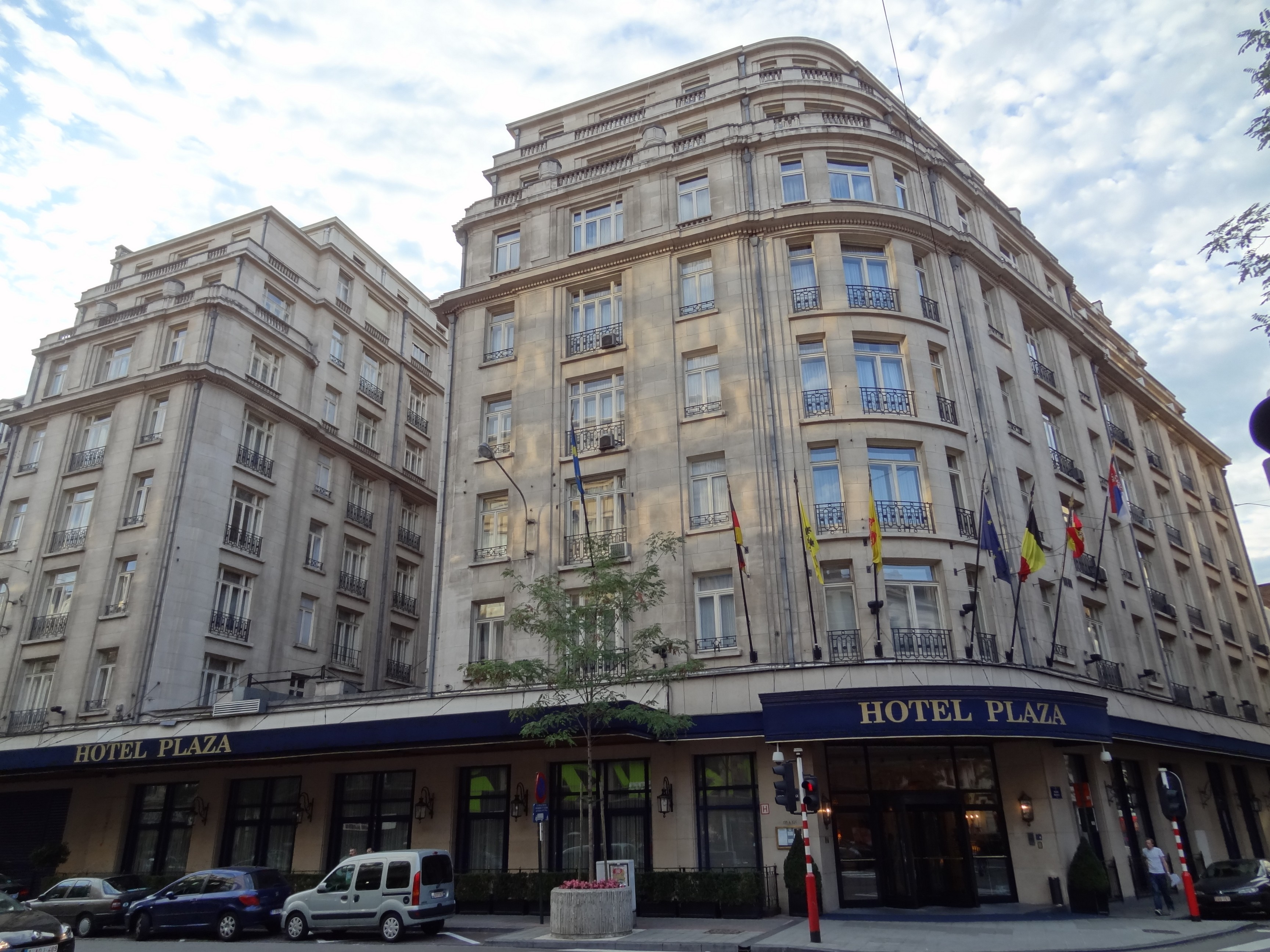
Hotel Le Plaza on the Boulevard Adolphe Max

=== Boulevard Émile Jacqmain ===
Connecting the Place de Brouckère to the Boulevard du Jardin botanique and the Boulevard d'Anvers/Antwerpselaan, the Boulevard Émile Jacqmain forms the western branch of the fork that marks the northern end of the Central Boulevards. Sumptuous in its time, the former Boulevard de la Senne/Zennelaan (because it follows the course of the river) was bordered by apartment buildings, commercial buildings, luxury hotels, town houses, and some bourgeois dwellings, which have now mostly been replaced by offices. Eclectic styles dominate with a good representation of the Second Empire. Functionalism and Art Deco are also represented by some buildings typical of the interwar period.

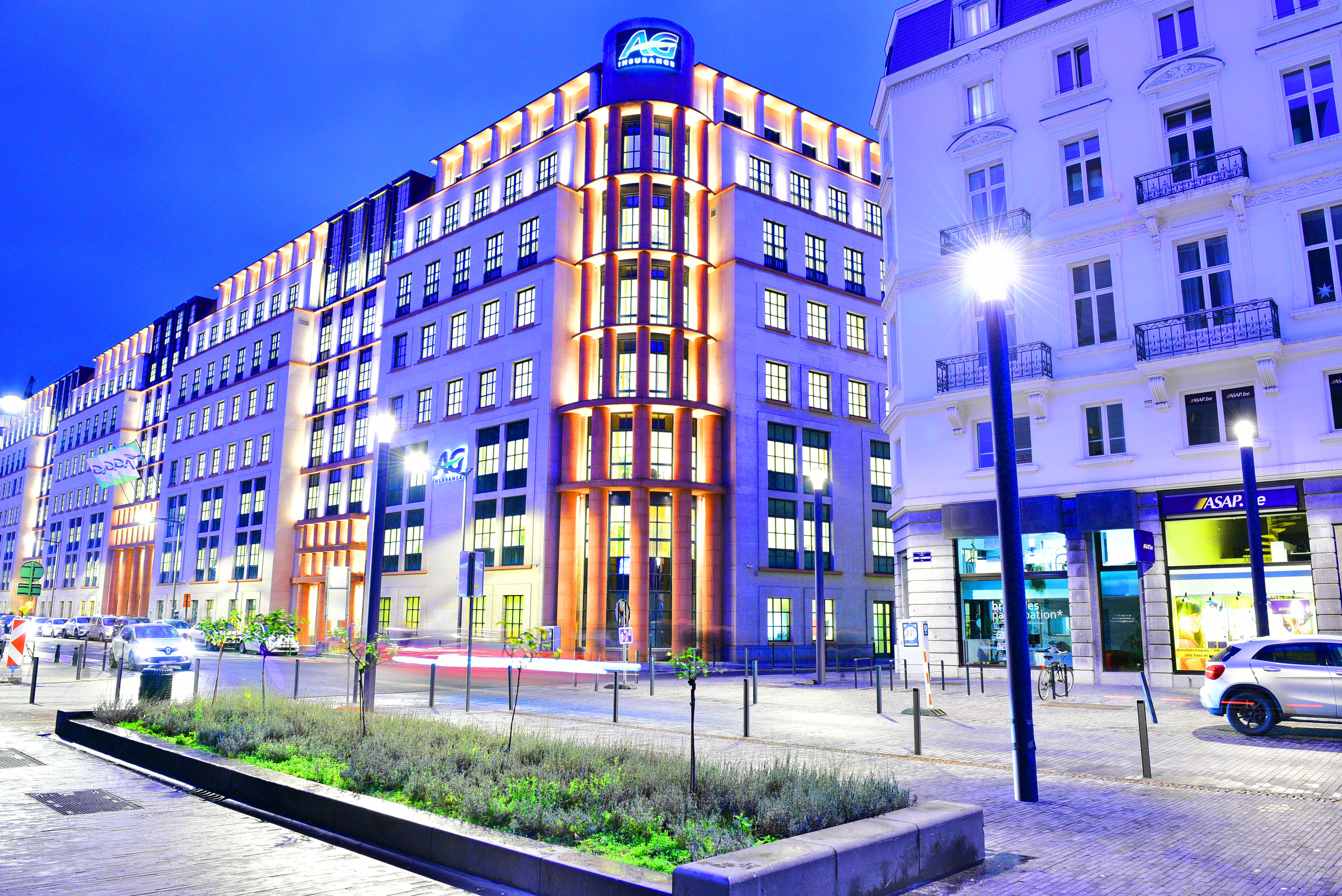
AG Insurance building on the Boulevard Émile Jacqmain/Émile Jacqmainlaan

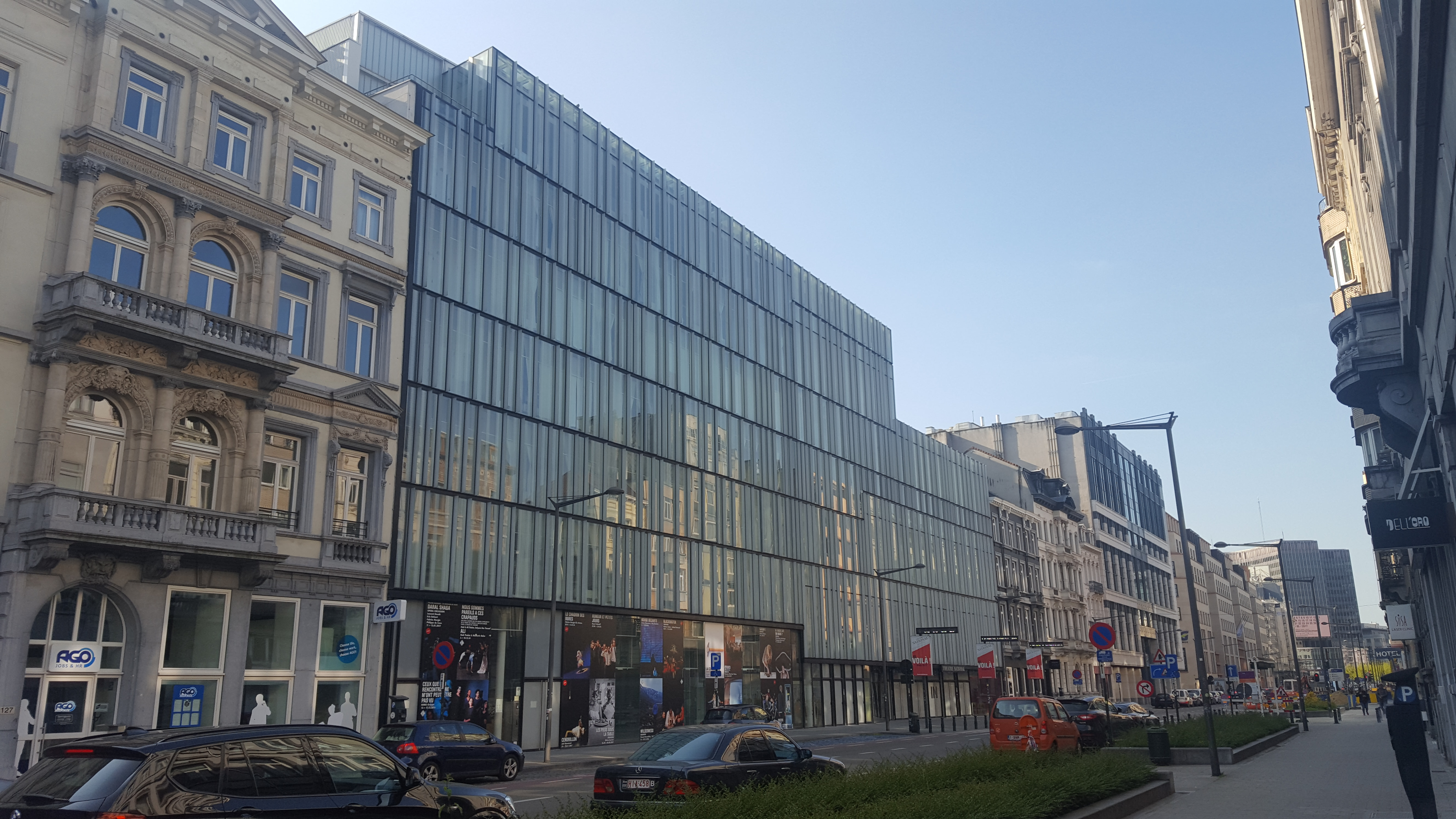
Théâtre national Wallonie-Bruxelles on the Boulevard Émile Jacqmain

== See also ==
- List of streets in Brussels
- Haussmann's renovation of Paris
- History of Brussels
- Belgium in the long nineteenth century
