= Hercule-Louis Turinetti, marquis of Prié =

Governor of the Habsburg Netherlands (1658–1726)

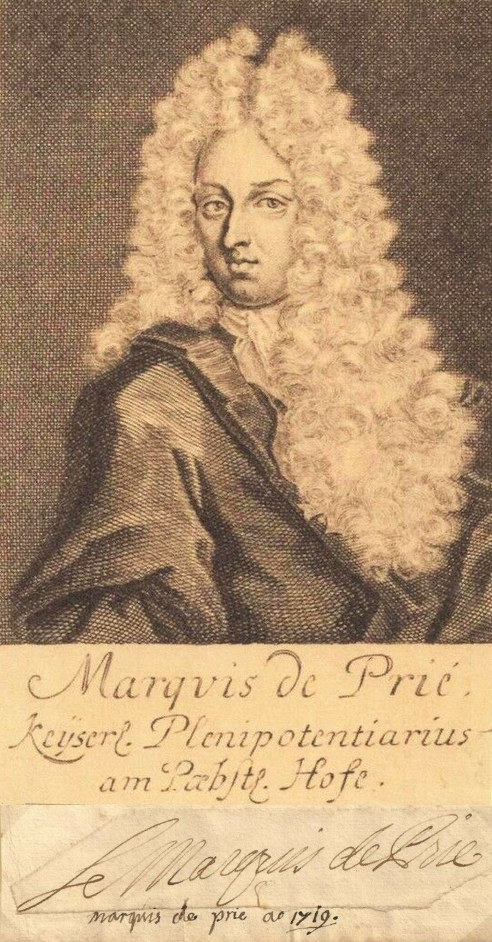
Portrait of Ercole Giuseppe Lodovico Turinetti (circa 1719)

Ercole Giuseppe Lodovico Turinetti, marchese di Priero e di Pancalieri also marchese di Priè (in Italian) or Hercule-Louis Turinetti, marquis de Prié (in French) (Turin, 27 November 1658 – Vienna, 12 January 1726), was interim Governor of the Habsburg Netherlands between 1716 and 1724.

== Biography ==
=== Rise to power ===
He was born in Turin in 1658, the second son of Giorgio Turinetti, Director of finances of the Duchy of Savoy, and Maria Violante Valperga di Rivara (1630-1690).
Upon the death of his father in 1673, he adopted the title of Count of Pertengo, as second-born. In 1678 his elder brother entered a monastery, leaving Ercole the title of head of the house.

In 1680, Queen-Regent Anne Marie d'Orléans appointed him Ambassador of Savoy in London. Returning to Turin, in 1683 he acquired all the assets and titles of the Turinetti family following the death of his uncle Giovan Antonio, and assumed the title of Marquis of Priero, while his younger brother adopted that of Count of Pertengo.

In 1691, he was appointed by Victor Amadeus II as Ambassador of Savoy to the Holy Roman Empire in Vienna. He had to leave Vienna a few years later, when Victor Amadeus II made an alliance with France. When Victor Amadeus switched sides in 1703 and re-established his alliance with the Holy Roman Empire, Turinetti returned to Vienna in 1704. He then went directly into the service of the Habsburg Empire and in 1706 became an Imperial councilor of state.

In 1708, Emperor Joseph I of Habsburg appointed him Imperial Ambassador to the Pope. As ambassador, he succeeded in having the Austrian Archduke Charles recognized by Pope Clement XI as the rightful King of Spain in 1709. His intervention in this capacity was fundamental for the development of Austrian rule in northern Italy. He returned to Vienna in 1714.

=== In the Habsburg Netherlands ===
In 1716, the Italian Marquis di Priè was deputy for the absent governor-general, Prince Eugene of Savoy. Turinetti ruled in a highly despotic manner, which eventually turned the entire country against him. He overhauled the structure of the Brussels central government, replacing the former Council of State, Council of Finance and the Secret Council by one all-encompassing Council of State under his own supervision. Because the reluctance of especially the Brabantine elite to cooperate with Prié's new form of government the entire central administration was paralysed for several years, until in 1725 Emperor Charles VI recalled Prié to Vienna upon the resignation of Prié's supporter, Prince Eugene.

Prié also upset the political elites in several towns in the Southern Netherlands. When the labour guilds of Antwerp and Brussels protested vigorously against the government taxes and tried to assert their ancient privileges, Prié caused the aged Frans Anneessens, syndic or chairman of one of these guilds, to be arrested and put to death (1719).

Prié also clashed with Claude Alexandre de Bonneval, the Austrian Master of the ordnance to the Low Countries and had him arrested and imprisoned pending his court martial at which he was convicted and condemned to death. The Emperor commuted the sentence to one year's imprisonment and banishment. De Bonneval then offered his services to the Turkish government, and was appointed to organize and command the Turkish artillery, eventually contributing to the Austrian defeat in the Austrian-Ottoman war.

In the autumn of 1724 Prince Eugene resigned his governorship of the Netherlands, which caused Prié to lose his only support. The Emperor intervened and relieved Prié of his duties. A commission was appointed to examine his rule, but Prié died only a year later, before the commission reached its final conclusions. The Emperor left the office of governor general to his sister Maria-Elisabeth.

== Literature ==
- Augusto MAESTRI, Ercole Giuseppe Luigi TURINETTI (Marquis di Priè.), "Accordi segreti fra Rinaldo d'Este, Duca di Modena, ed il Marchese di Prie, ambasciatore cesareo, per l'acquisto della Mirandola, 1708-1711". Documenti inediti tratti dalla Biblioteca Estense (MSS. Campori) e dall'Archivio di Stato di Modena (1911)
- Enzo Piscitelli, Legazione Sarda in Vienna (1707–1859, Roma (1950), pp. 16–17
- A. Reumont, "Il marchese di Priè nel Belgio". In: Archivio Storico Italiano IV, 17 (1886), pp. 213–242
- M. Huisman, "Prié, Hercule-Joseph Turinetti, marquis de", Biographie Nationale, XVIII (1905), pp. 231–243.
- Ghislaine De Boom, Les ministres plénipotentaires dans les Pays-Bas autrichiens, principalement Cobenzl, Brussels: Académie Royale de Belgique (1932).
- R. Zedinger, Die Verwaltung der Österreichischen Niederlande in Wien (1714 - 1795), Vienna-Cologne-Weimar, Böhlau Verlag (2000).
