= André-Napoléon Fontainas =

Belgian liberal politician and mayor of Brussels (1807–1863)

André-Napoléon de Fontainas
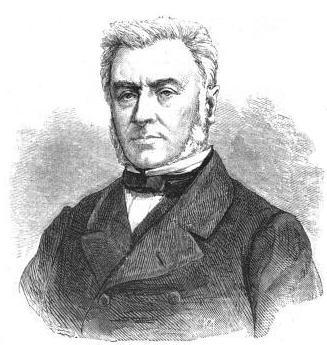

Mayor of Brussels
- In office 21 April 1860 – 19 July 1863
- Preceded by: Charles de Brouckère
- Succeeded by: Jules Anspach

Personal details
- Born: André-Napoléon de Fontainas; 23 December 1807 Brussels, First French Empire
- Died: 19 July 1863 (aged 55) Brussels, Belgium
- Party: Liberal Party
- Occupation: Lawyer, politician

André-Napoléon Fontainas (23 December 1807 – 19 July 1863) was a Belgian liberal politician, alderman and mayor of the City of Brussels.

== Life ==
Fontainas was born and died in Brussels. His father came from the Auvergne region in France, and settled in Brussels in 1796 and worked in the Amigo prison. André-Napoléon graduated as a lawyer at the State University of Louvain and started working at the bar of Brussels. He was elected to the city council in 1841 and was appointed as an alderman in 1846. In 1849 he became a member of the chamber of representatives, after which he gave up his legal practice. As a politician he worked on social issues, to alleviate slum conditions and to improve educational facilities. In 1860, as first alderman of Brussels, he was appointed burgomaster by King Leopold I of Belgium. André-Napoléon de Fontainas served only for 30 months, as he died on 19 July 1863, while in office.

== Legacy ==
In recognition of his efforts for education, the city council authorised the construction of a housing block for retired teachers and the Cité Fontainas was inaugurated on 26 September 1867. Today, one of Brussels' central squares, the Place Fontainas/Fontainasplein, is also named in is honour.

== See also ==
- List of mayors of the City of Brussels
