= South Palace =

Former covered market in Brussels, Belgium

- Palais du Midi (French); Zuidpaleis (Dutch)
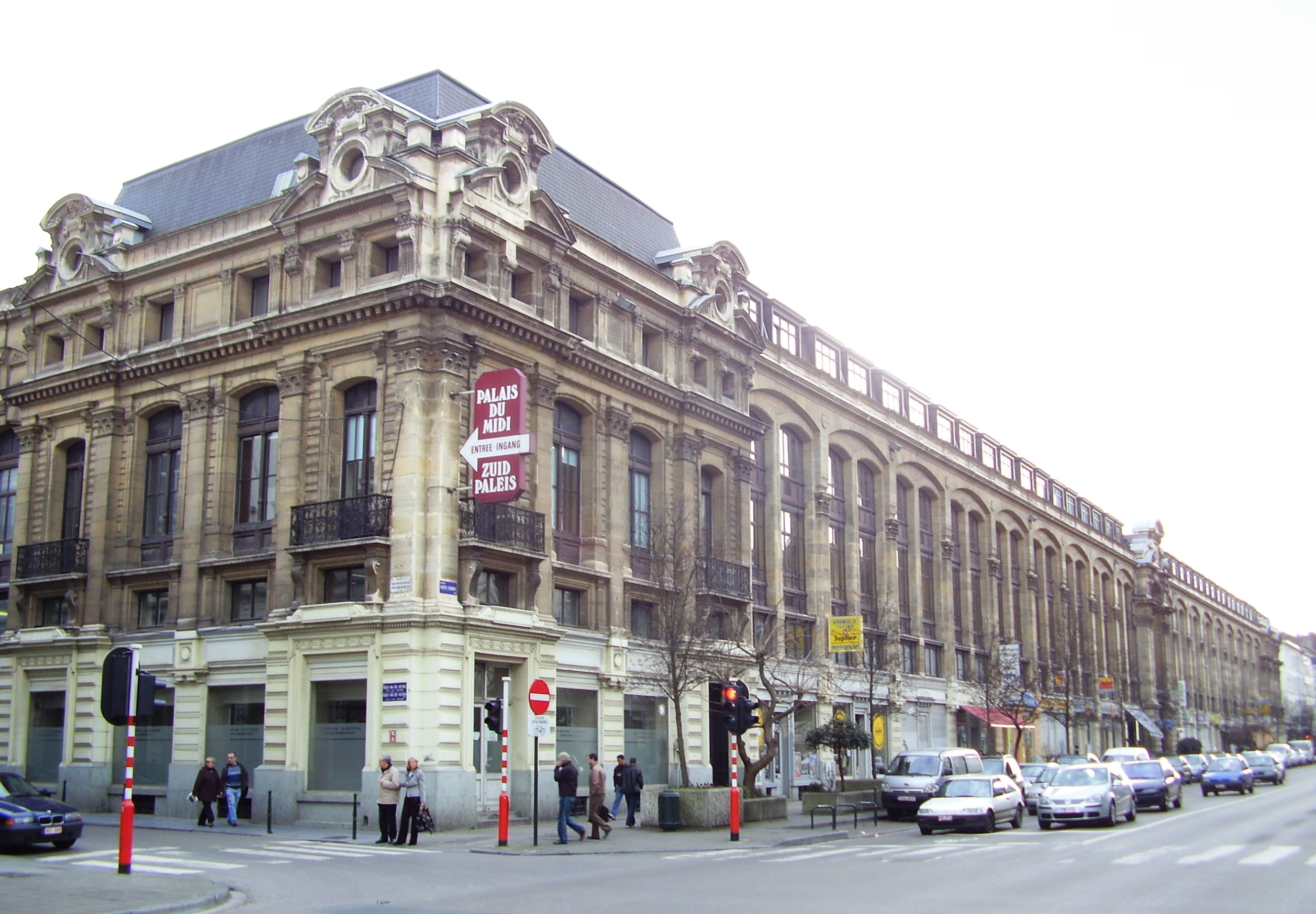
- The South Palace seen from the Boulevard Maurice Lemonnier/Maurice Lemonnierlaan
- Interactive map of the South Palace area
- Alternative names: Midi Palace

General information
- Architectural style: Eclectic; Neoclassical; Second Empire
- Location: Boulevard Maurice Lemonnier / Maurice Lemonnierlaan 132–172, 1000 City of Brussels, Brussels-Capital Region, Belgium
- Coordinates: 50°50′29″N 4°20′35″E
- Construction started: 1875
- Completed: 1880
- Inaugurated: 1879
- Owner: City of Brussels

Design and construction
- Architect: Wynand Janssens

The South Palace or Midi Palace (French: Palais du Midi; Dutch: Zuidpaleis) is a former covered market in Brussels, Belgium. It was originally built between 1875 and 1880 by the architect Wynand Janssens for the Compagnie générale des Marchés, though it was heavily renovated in the 20th and 21st centuries. Nowadays, it still houses shops, as well as several sports halls and a school.

The building is located at 132–172, boulevard Maurice Lemonnier/Maurice Lemonnierlaan in the Midi–Lemonnier or Stalingrad Quarter (southern part of the City of Brussels).

== History ==
The South Palace was built following the covering of the river Senne (1867–1871), carried out under the tenure of the then-mayor of the City of Brussels, Jules Anspach. The objective was to stimulate commercial activity in the southern section of the Central Boulevards, considered less prestigious by the bourgeoisie of the time. Construction began in 1875, commissioned by the Compagnie générale des Marchés, and was completed in 1880. The building was designed by the local architect Wynand Janssens, who also designed the Hôtel du Gouverneur, the former main office of the Belgian National Bank.

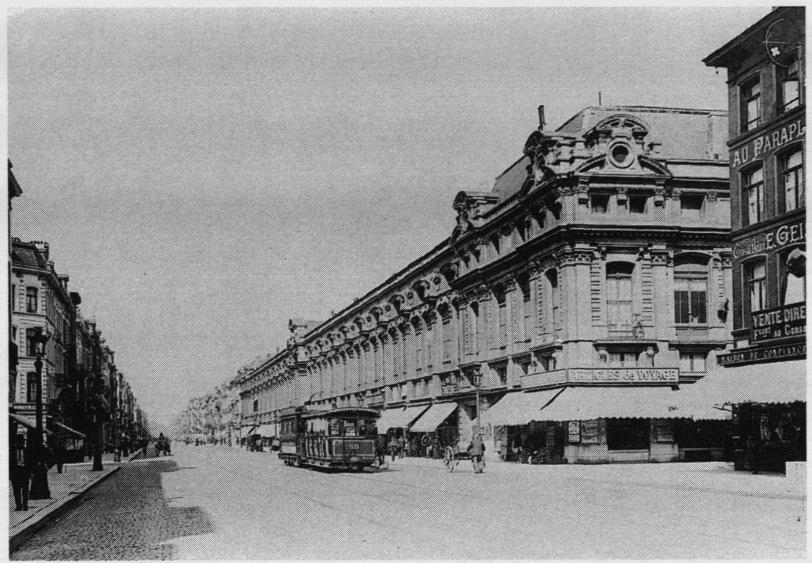
The South Palace in the late 19th century

Destined for varying fortunes, this market-bazaar has served all sorts of purposes. Market activity gradually declined during the 20th century, but the commercial vocation of the ground floors has never wavered. However, the shops planned for the first floor quickly gave way to the City of Brussels' industrial school. The City purchased the complex in 1907 and gradually transformed it into administrative offices.

The building underwent a first renovation and redevelopment campaign from 1924 to 1927. The architect commissioned for this purpose, Maurice Van Ysendyck, fitted out a ticket hall in the south wing, removed decorative elements from the Lemonnier façade to let in more light, and gained space by adding mansard roofs to certain wings. From 1950 to 1958, the east wing was renovated: the supports of the original attic were lowered and a further floor, set back from the original structure, was added. Interior alterations were also made on that occasion.

In the second half of the 20th century, the complex began to take on new uses. For example, from the early 1980s onwards, sports activities were held there, and new schools were established. The Vrije Universiteit Brussel (VUB) expressed interest in the building during its early years, but ultimately decided not to purchase it. Another major restoration was conducted in phases between 1979 and 1992 under the direction of André and Jean Polak. It focused on enhancing the building's commercial function, developing a sports complex in the north wing, and renovating the school in the south.

In 2010, a new renovation began on several sports halls, including that of the Royal IV Brussels basketball club (known as the Royal Atomia Brussels until 2011). In 2013, a neighbourhood project was launched to restore and upgrade the dilapidated façades.

== Description ==
An imposing commercial complex in eclectic style, described at the time as a "disastrous undertaking" by the specialist press, the building is decorated in blue and white stone. Above a ground floor of display windows, the upper floors feature large bays, made possible by the use of a metallic structure.

Using neoclassical elements for decorative purposes, the architect opted for the same colossal pilasters across the entire façade, which forced him to multiply the transitional elements to adapt them to the different elevations. This resulted in a profusion of decoration, further emphasised by Second Empire-style ornamentation (rosettes, friezes of meanders or acanthus leaves, festoons, mascarons, lion heads, bee motifs and symbols of Hermes).

The immense quadrangle surrounds two vast inner courtyards, originally glazed, separated by a covered passageway called the Passage du Travail/Arbeidsdoorgang ("Work Passage"). The corners and central sections are covered with monumental gables that sometimes conceal the openings.

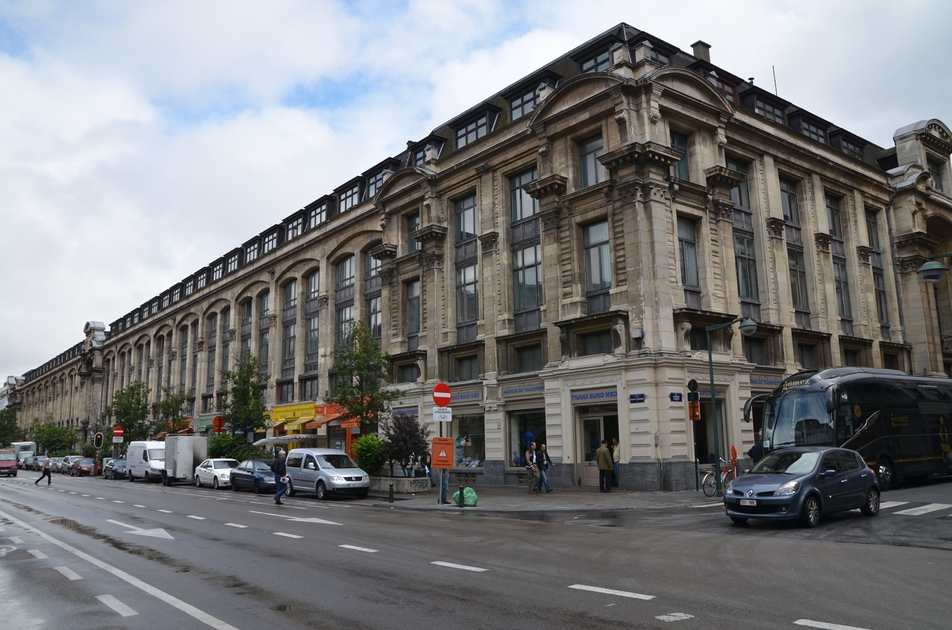
Façade along the Boulevard Maurice Lemonnier/Maurice Lemonnierlaan

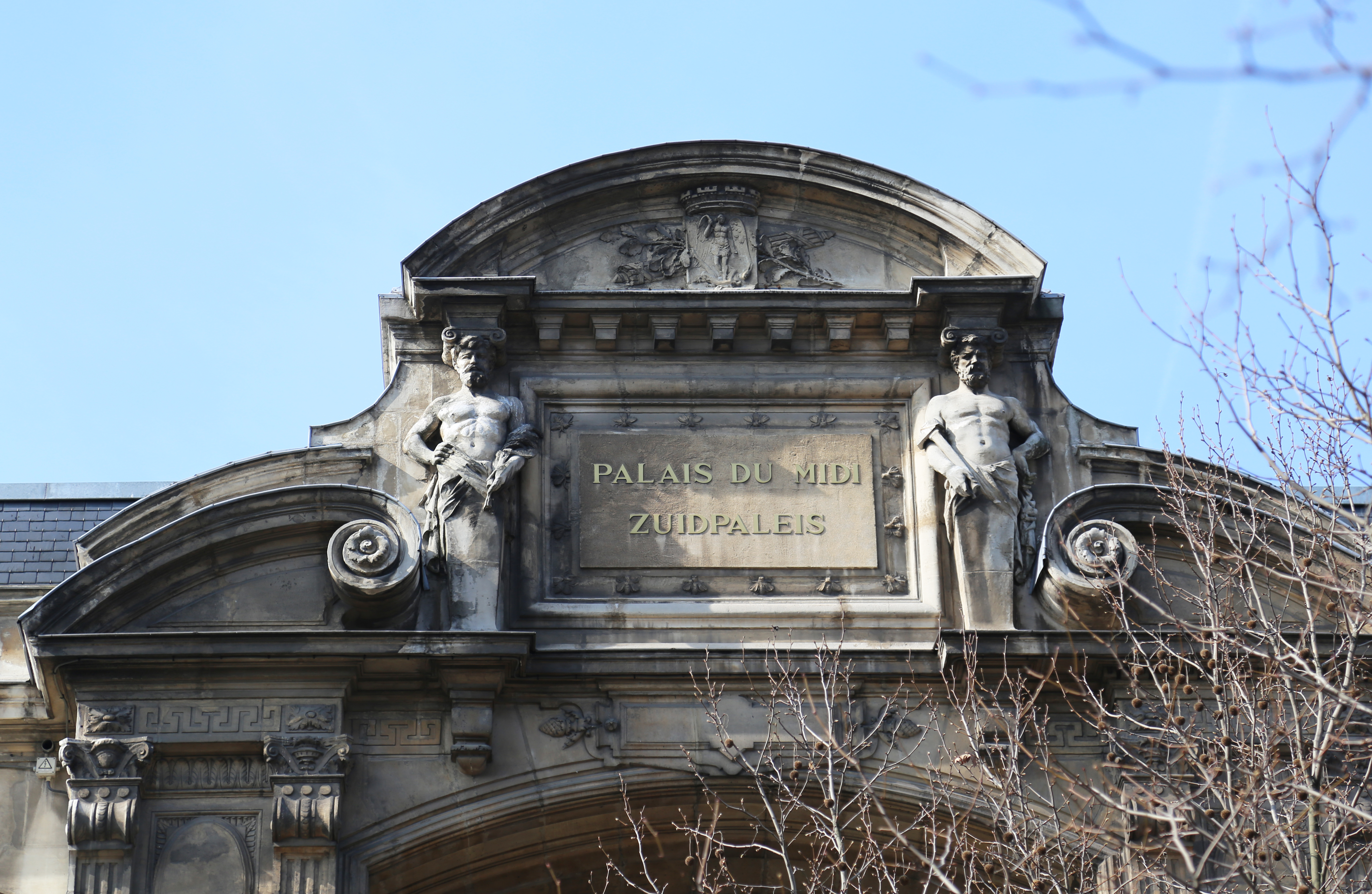
Pediment of the Passage du Travail/Arbeidsdoorgang

== See also ==
- Neoclassical architecture in Belgium
- History of Brussels
- Belgium in the long nineteenth century
