= Place Anneessens =

Square in Brussels, Belgium

Place Anneessens (French); Anneessensplein (Dutch)
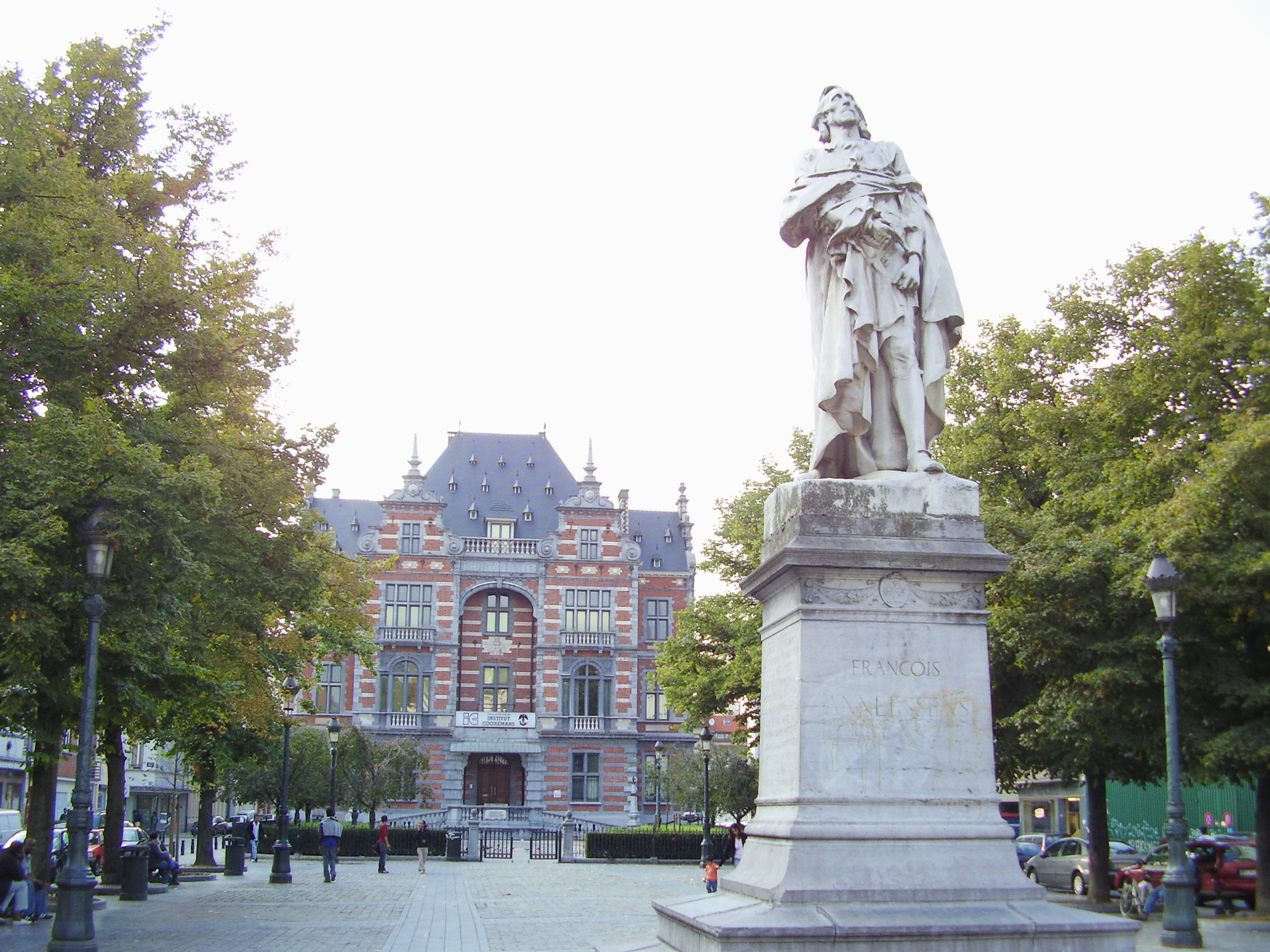
- Haute École Francisco Ferrer and Monument to François Anneessens on the Place Anneessens/Anneessensplein

- Location within Brussels Location within Belgium
- Type: Square
- Location: City of Brussels, Brussels-Capital Region, Belgium
- Quarter: Midi–Lemonnier or Stalingrad Quarter
- Postal code: 1000
- Coordinates: 50°50′38″N 04°20′38″E

Construction
- Inauguration: 1639

The Place Anneessens (French, pronounced [plas a.nɛ.sɛns]) or Anneessensplein (Dutch, pronounced [ˈaneːsənsˌplɛin]) is a square in central Brussels, Belgium. It is named in honour of François Anneessens, dean of the Nation of St. Christopher (one of the Guilds of Brussels), who was beheaded on the Grand-Place/Grote Markt (Brussels' main square) during a period of uprisings within the Austrian Netherlands.

The square is located halfway down the Boulevard Maurice Lemonnier/Maurice Lemonnierlaan, in the Midi–Lemonnier or Stalingrad Quarter (southern part of the City of Brussels). It is served by the premetro (underground tram) station Anneessens on lines 4 and 10.

== History ==
Together with the seven streets that lead to it, the Place Anneessens was laid out in 1639 on the Voldersbempt or Pré aux Foulons, a secluded piece of meadow bordered by the Rue d'Anderlecht/Anderlechtstraat, the river Senne and a man-made arm of the river, called the "Lesser Senne" (French: Petite Senne, Dutch: Kleine Zenne).

Until the covering of the Senne (1867–1871), the square was the site of a famous flea market, known as the Old Market (French: Vieux Marché, Dutch: Oude Markt). Due to the construction of the Central Boulevards, which attracted a more affluent public, and complaints from local residents about "its filth and its fleas", in March 1873, Brussels' municipal council decided to transfer the Old Market to the Place du Jeu de Balle/Vossenplein in the Marolles/Marollen district, a function that square has kept to this day.

In 1870, the square was given the name of the liberal politician Joseph Lebeau. As early as 1889, it was renamed after François Anneessens, dean of the Nation of St. Christopher, who was beheaded in 1719 on the Grand-Place because of his resistance to innovations in city government detrimental to the power of the guilds and for his suspected involvement with uprisings within the Austrian Netherlands. A statue created in 1889 by the sculptor Thomas Vinçotte recalls Anneessens' memory.

== Places of interest ==
On the western side, the Place Anneessens is dominated by the former Municipal School no. 13, a building from 1880 in neo-Flemish Renaissance style to the plans of the architect Charles-Émile Janlet. The Lucien Cooremans Institute was also housed in the building. Nowadays, the building is occupied by two departments of the Haute École Francisco Ferrer (HEFF).

Since November 2013, there has been a comic strip wall with a four-storey mural depicting a scene from Thorgal on the corner of the Place Anneessens and the Rue de la Caserne/Kazernestraat.

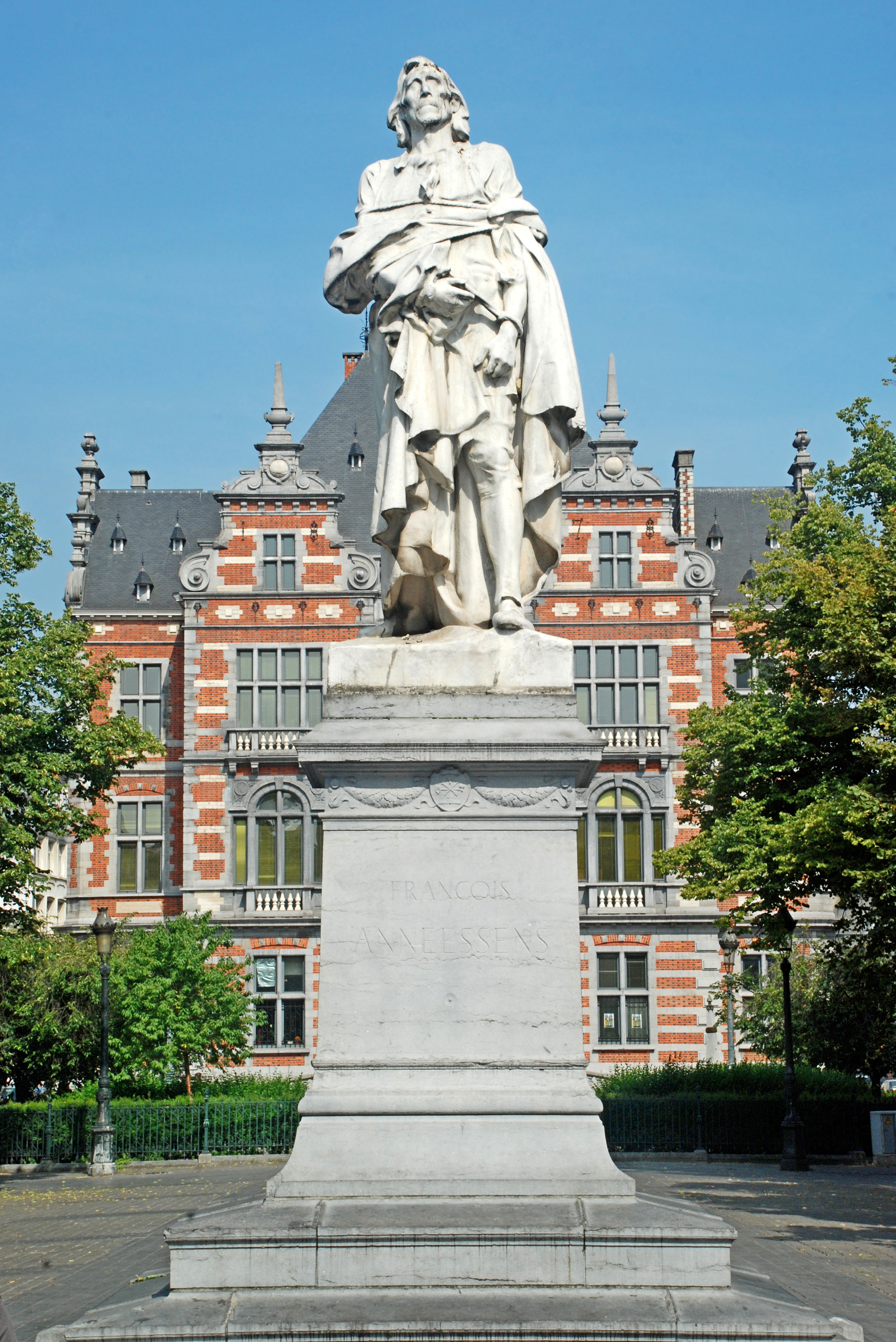
Monument to François-Anneessens (Vinçotte, 1889)

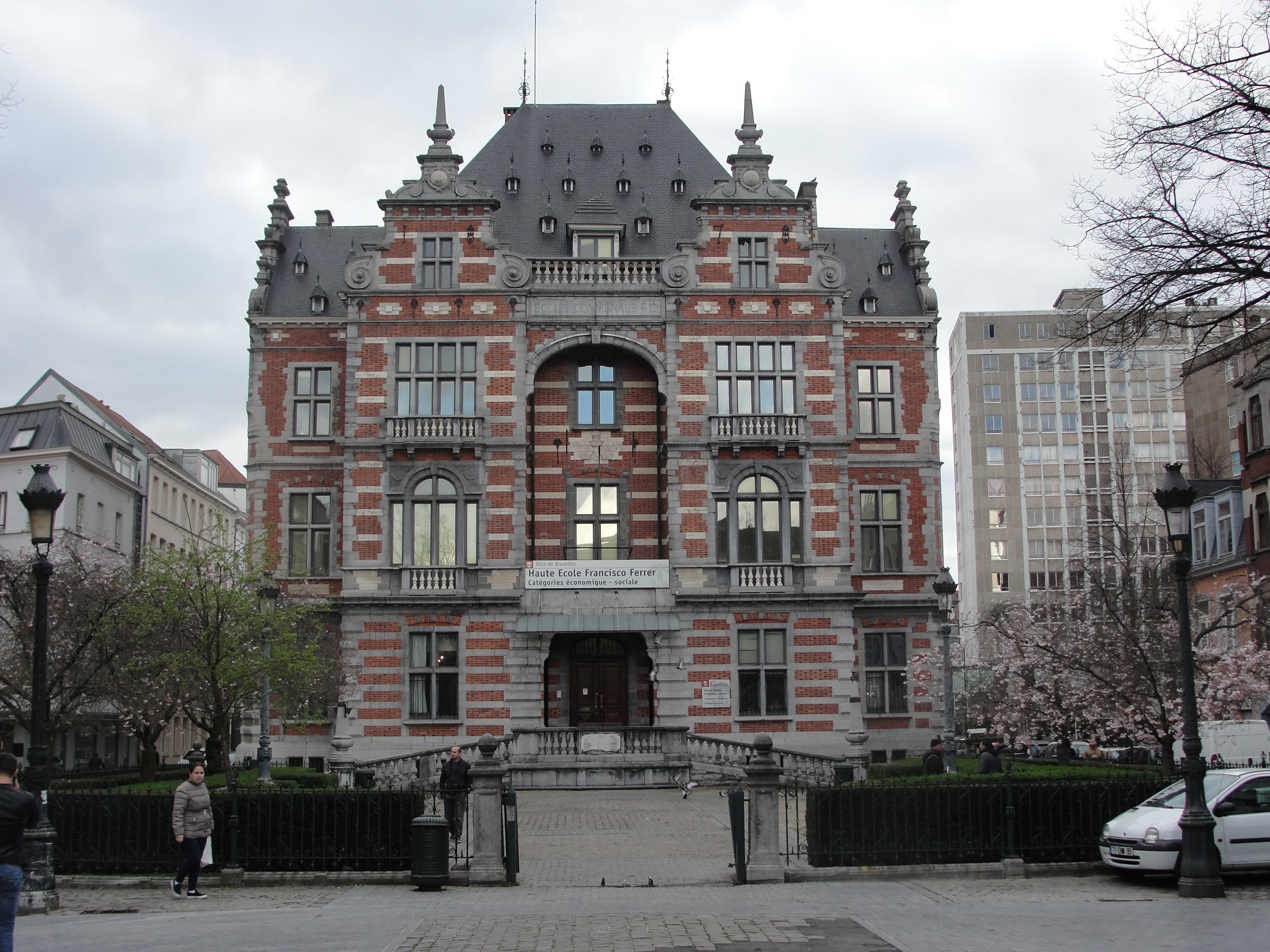
Former Municipal School no. 13 (Janlet, 1880), now the Haute École Francisco Ferrer

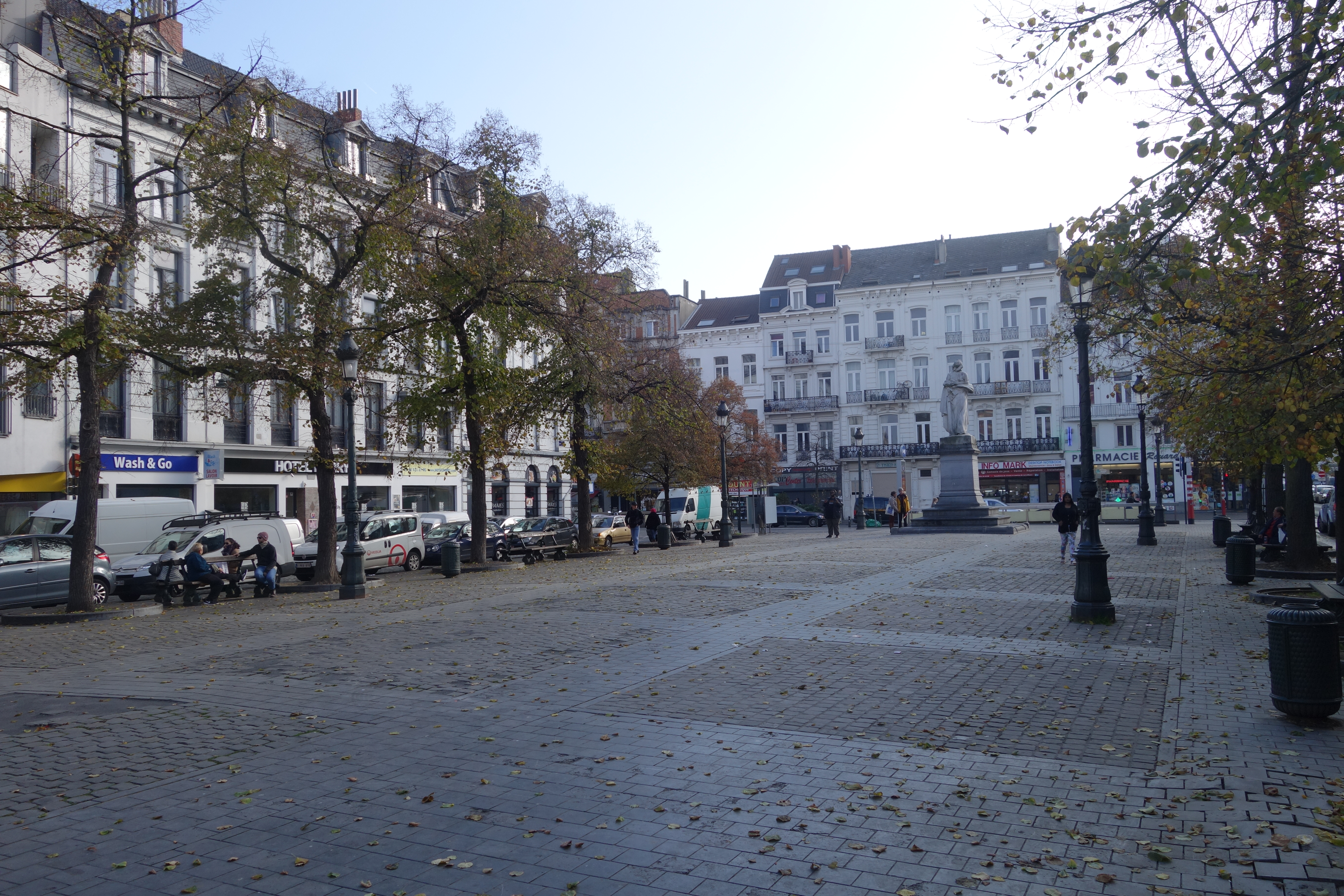
View towards the Boulevard Maurice Lemonnier/Maurice Lemonnierlaan

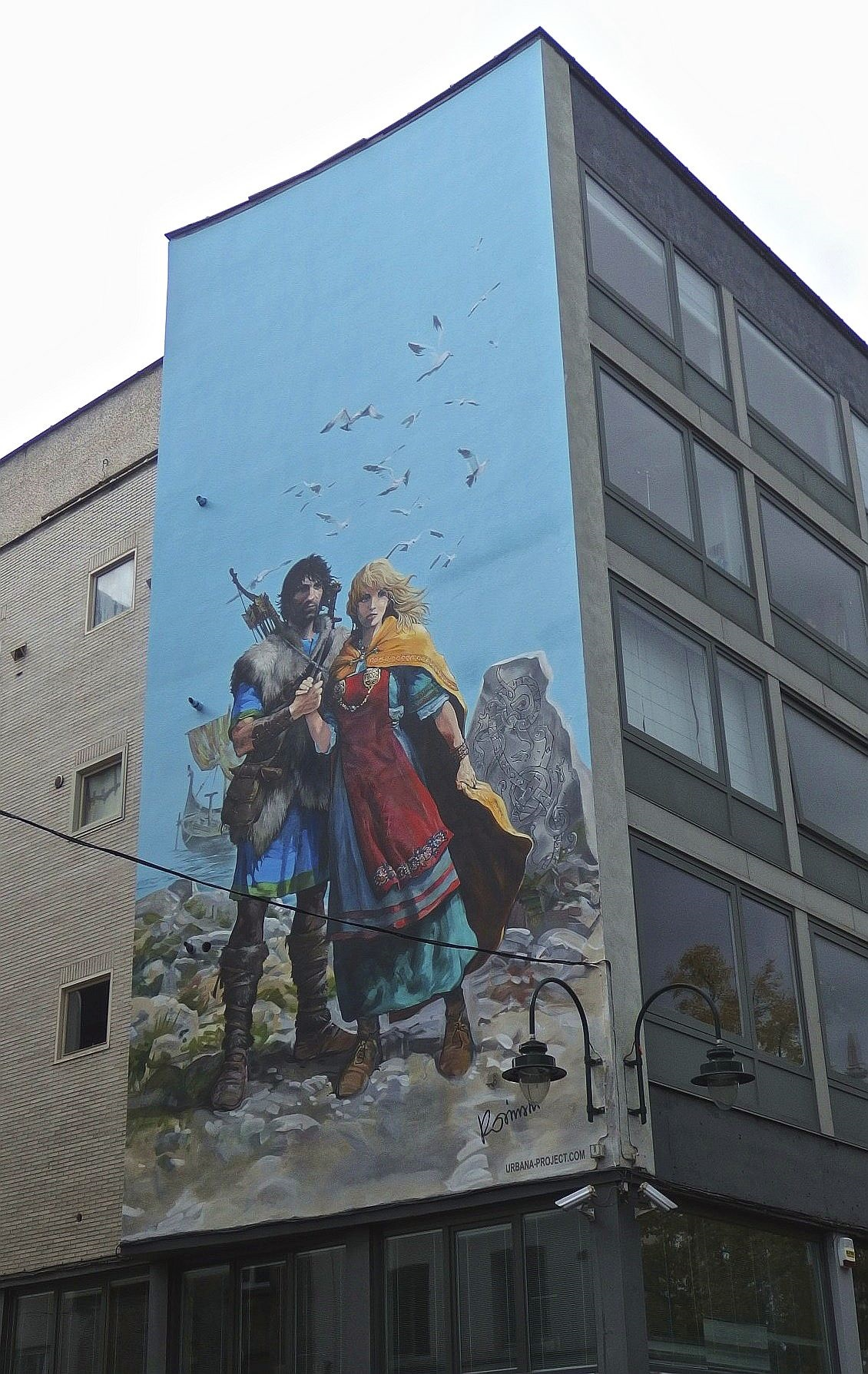
Thorgal and Aaricia comic strip wall (2013)

== See also ==
- Neoclassical architecture in Belgium
- History of Brussels
- Belgium in the long nineteenth century
