= Boulevard Maurice Lemonnier =

Thoroughfare in Brussels, Belgium

Boulevard Maurice Lemonnier (French); Maurice Lemonnierlaan (Dutch)
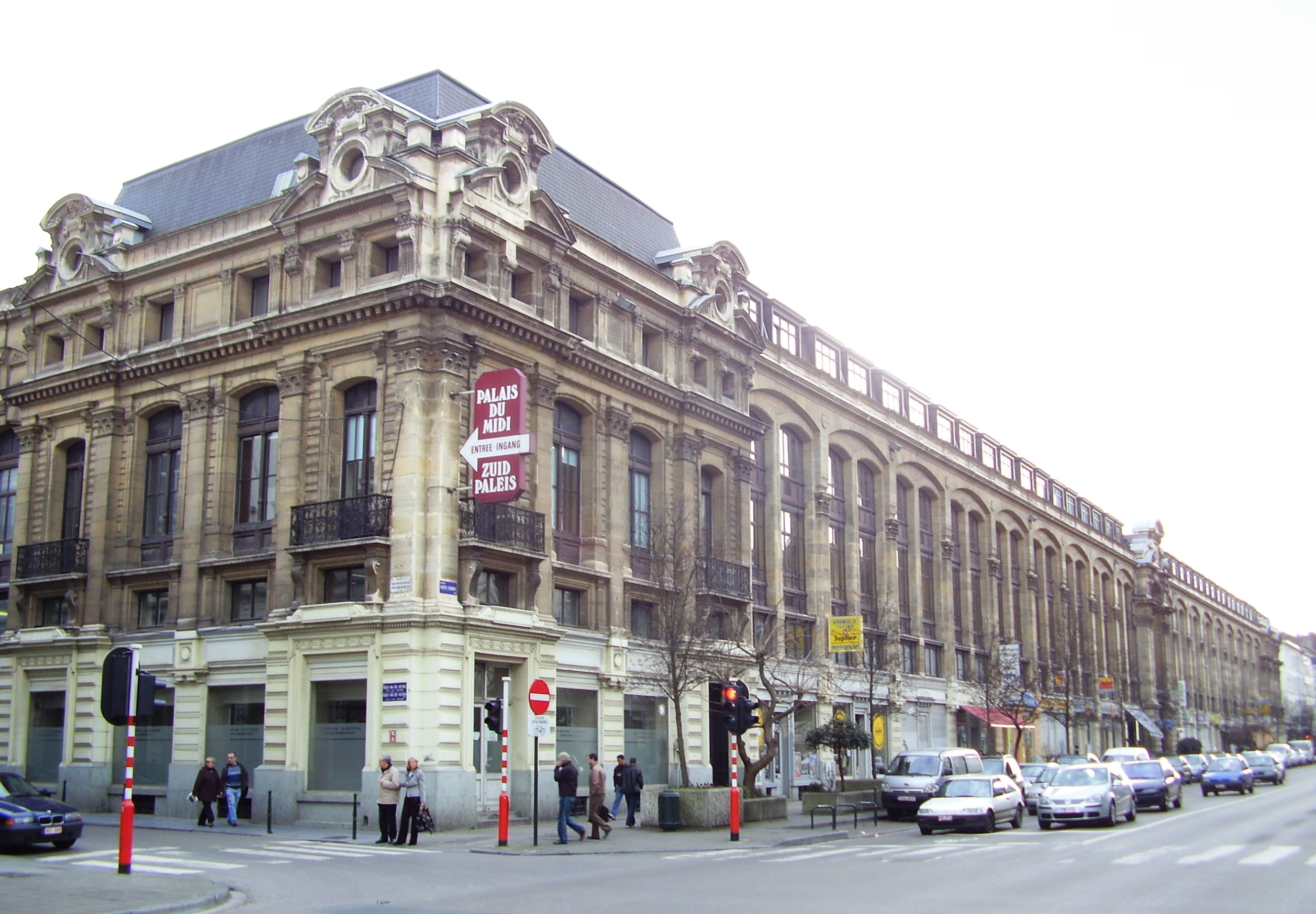
- South Palace on the Boulevard Maurice Lemonnier/Maurice Lemonnierlaan

- Location within Brussels Location within Belgium
- Former names: Boulevard du Hainaut (French); Henegouwenlaan (Dutch)
- Part of: Central Boulevards of Brussels
- Namesake: Maurice Lemonnier
- Type: Boulevard
- Location: City of Brussels, Brussels-Capital Region, Belgium
- Quarter: Midi–Lemonnier or Stalingrad Quarter
- Postal code: 1000
- Coordinates: 50°50′34″N 4°20′38″E

Construction
- Completed: 1868–1871

Other
- Designer: Léon Suys

The Boulevard Maurice Lemonnier (French) or Maurice Lemonnierlaan (Dutch) is a central boulevard in Brussels, Belgium. It was created following the covering of the river Senne (1867–1871), and bears the name of Maurice Lemonnier, a former Alderman for Public Works.

The Boulevard Maurice Lemonnier stretches from the Boulevard du Midi/Zuidlaan to the Place Fontainas/Fontainasplein. To the north, it crosses the Place Anneessens/Anneessensplein about halfway through, and continues towards the Place Fontainas where it becomes the Boulevard Anspach/Anspachlaan. This area is served by the premetro (underground tram) stations Lemonnier and Anneessens on lines 4 and 10.

== History ==
The Boulevard Maurice Lemonnier was laid out between 1868 and 1871, as part of the Central Boulevards, which were created after the covering of the river Senne. The boulevard was originally named the Boulevard du Hainaut/Henegouwenlaan ("Hainaut Boulevard"). In 1919, it was renamed in honour of the liberal politician and Alderman for Public Works, Maurice Lemonnier (1860–1930), who had been arrested and subsequently deported by the Germans in 1917.

== See also ==
- List of streets in Brussels
- History of Brussels
- Belgium in the long nineteenth century
