= Place Fontainas =

Square in Brussels, Belgium

Place Fontainas (French); Fontainasplein (Dutch)
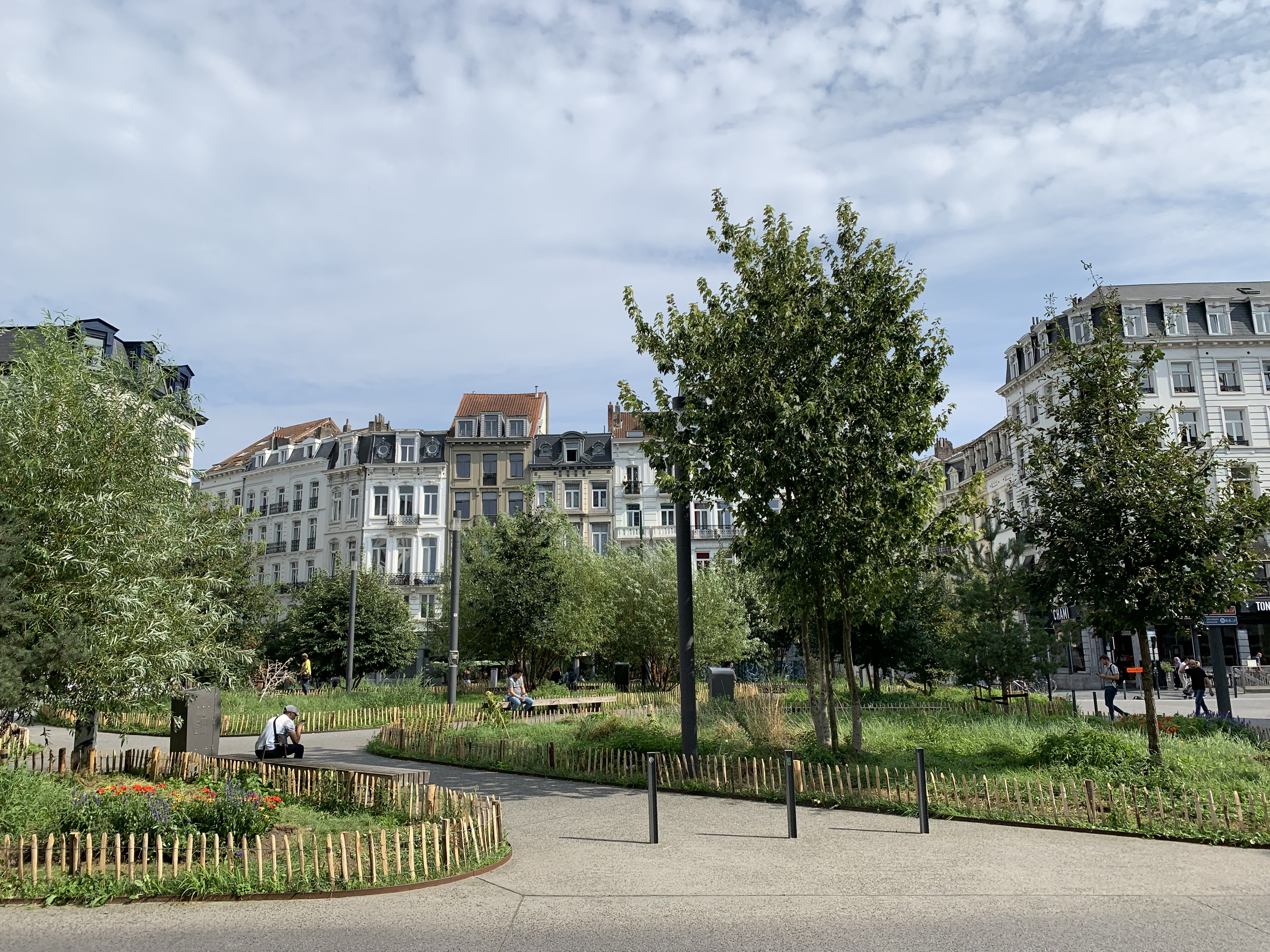
- The Place Fontainas/Fontainasplein in Brussels

- Location within Brussels Location within Belgium
- Type: Square
- Location: City of Brussels, Brussels-Capital Region, Belgium
- Quarter: Midi–Lemonnier or Stalingrad Quarter
- Postal code: 1000
- Coordinates: 50°50′43″N 04°20′47″E

Construction
- Completion: c. 1870

The Place Fontainas (French, pronounced [plas fɔ̃.tɛ.nas]) or Fontainasplein (Dutch, pronounced [fɔnˈtɛinɑsˌplɛin]) is a square in central Brussels, Belgium. It was created following the covering of the river Senne (1867–1871). It is named in honour of André-Napoléon Fontainas, a former mayor of the City of Brussels.

The square lies at the conjunction of the Boulevard Anspach/Anspachlaan to the north with the Boulevard Maurice Lemonnier/Maurice Lemonnierlaan to the south, in the Midi–Lemonnier or Stalingrad Quarter (southern part of the City of Brussels). It is served by the premetro (underground tram) station Anneessens on lines 4 and 10.

== History ==
=== Early history ===
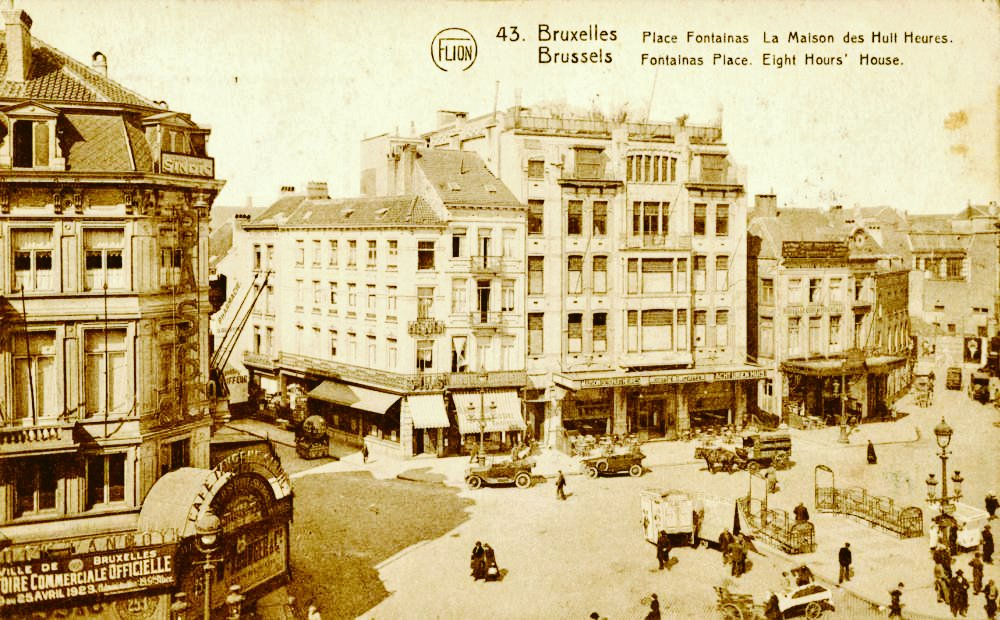
The Place Fontainas/Fontainasplein at the beginning of the 20th century

The Place Fontainas was laid out following the covering of the river Senne (1867–1871), as part of the major urban works by the architect Léon Suys under the tenure of the then-mayor of the City of Brussels, Jules Anspach.

Located at the junction of the Boulevard Anspach/Anspachlaan (then called the Boulevard Central/Centraallaan) and the Boulevard Maurice Lemonnier/Maurice Lemonnierlaan, the square occupies the site of the former Small Island (French: Petite Île, Dutch: Klein Eiland) formed by two arms of the Senne, an old link between the Rue du Marché au Charbon/Kolenmarkt and the Rue d'Anderlecht/Anderlechtsesteenweg. The bent end of the latter now forms the western side of the square.

In his 1865 project, Suys planned to erect a monumental fountain on the square, which was to break the boulevards' uniformity, but it was abandoned for budgetary reasons. Since 1871, the square has borne the name of the liberal politician and former mayor of the City of Brussels, André-Napoléon Fontainas.

=== 1970s to present ===
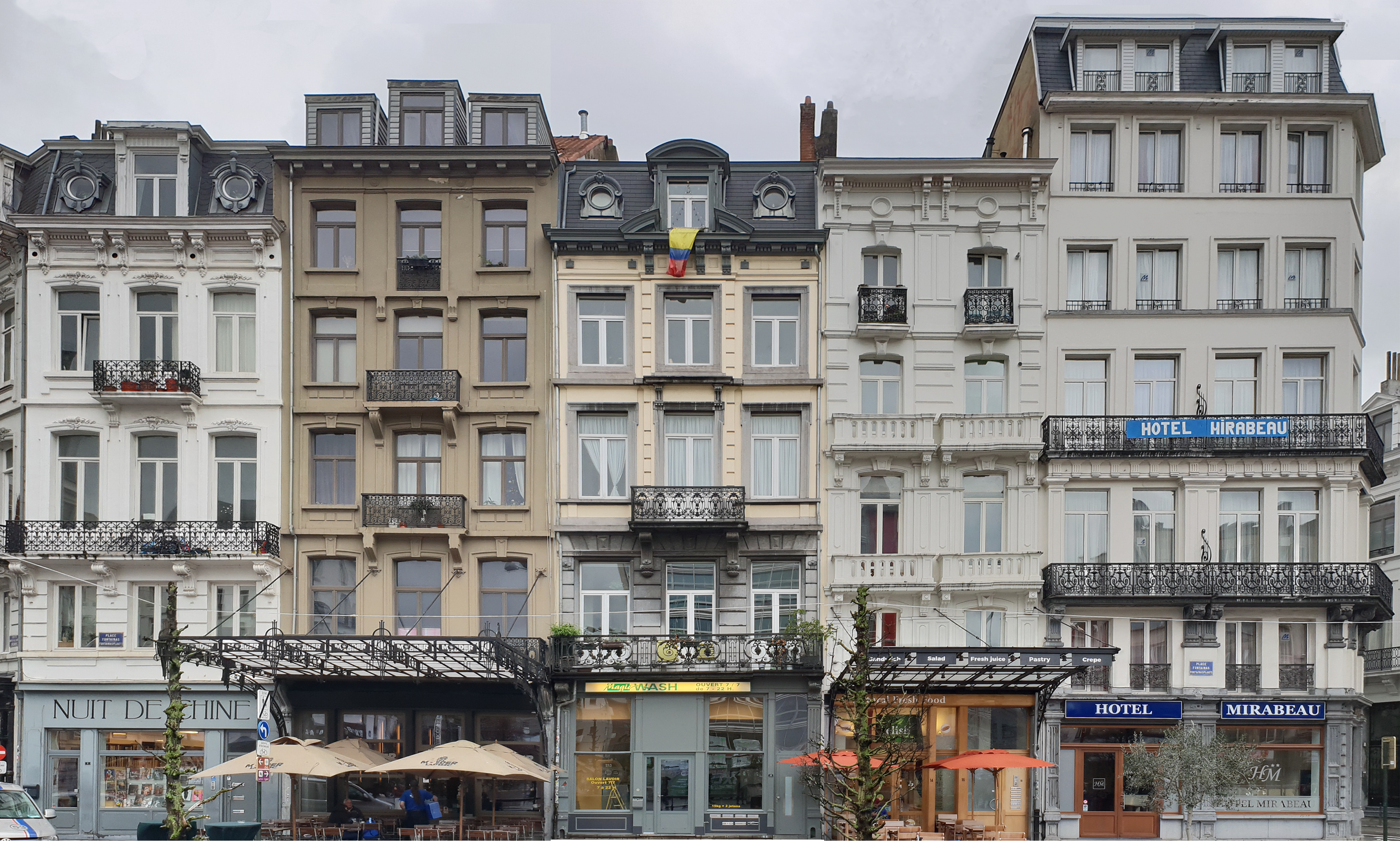
Eastern side

Due to the presence of gay bars on and around the Rue du Marché au Charbon, the Place Fontanais became the centre of gay prostitution in Brussels from the early 1970s. Men from all walks of life came there to pick up often young prostitutes (between 14 and 25 years old). After the police ended a prostitution network with Macedonian children aged 12 to 14 in 1995–96, gay prostitution in the square no longer caused any particular problems.

Since its creation in the 19th century, the square has often changed appearance. Nevertheless, it retains a large number of fin de siècle buildings. Since 29 June 2015, it has been part of a large pedestrian zone in central Brussels (French: Le Piétonnier). On that occasion, it was partially restored to its original appearance and was repaved. Decorated with plantations and equipped with numerous benches, it once again constitutes a pleasant space.

== See also ==
- Neoclassical architecture in Belgium
- History of Brussels
- Belgium in the long nineteenth century
