= Frans Anneessens =

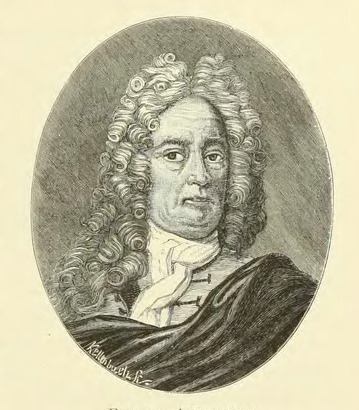
- Born: 25 February 1660
- Died: 19 September 1719 (aged 59)
- Resting place: Church of Our Lady of the Chapel

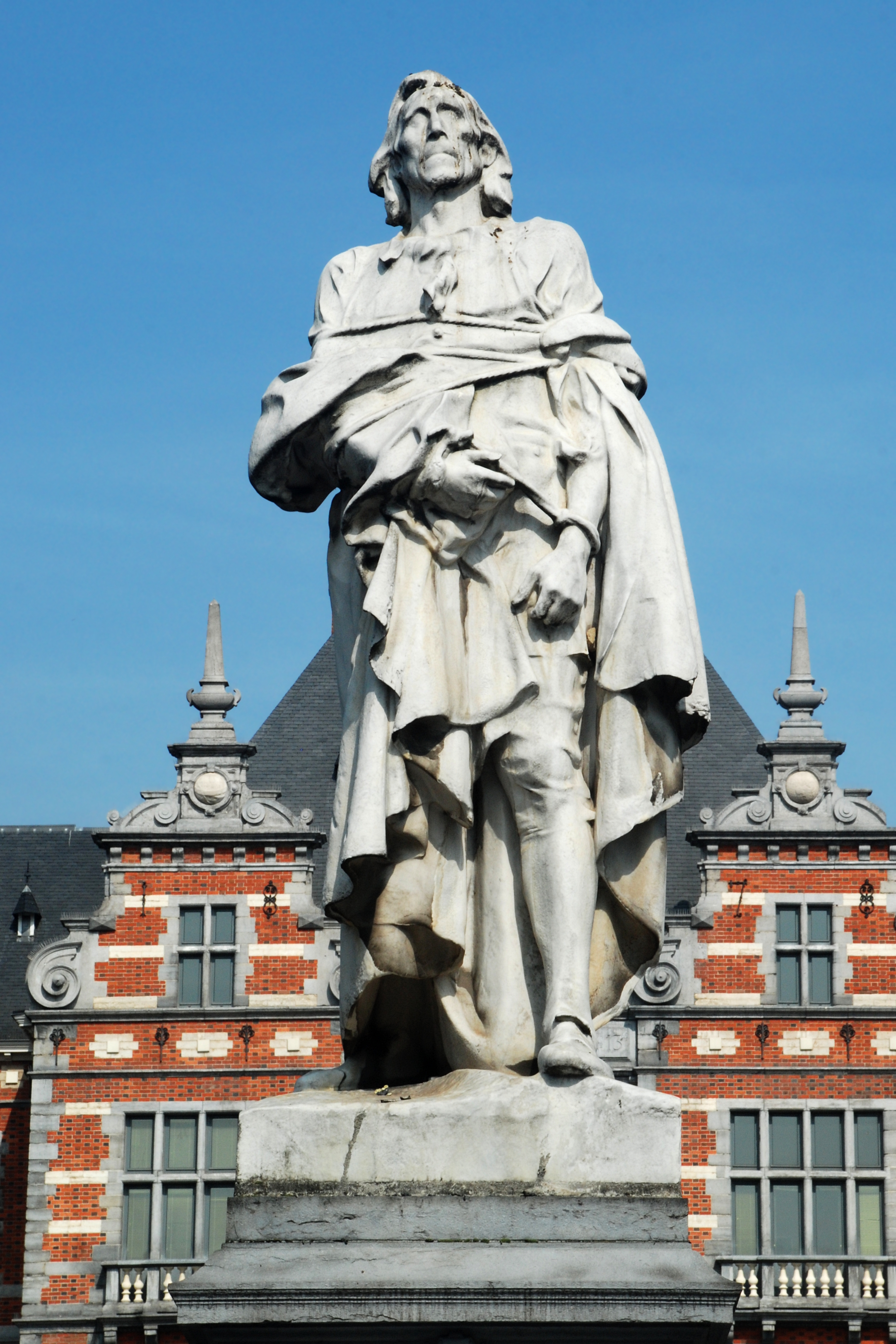
Statue of François Anneessens by Thomas Vinçotte (1889)

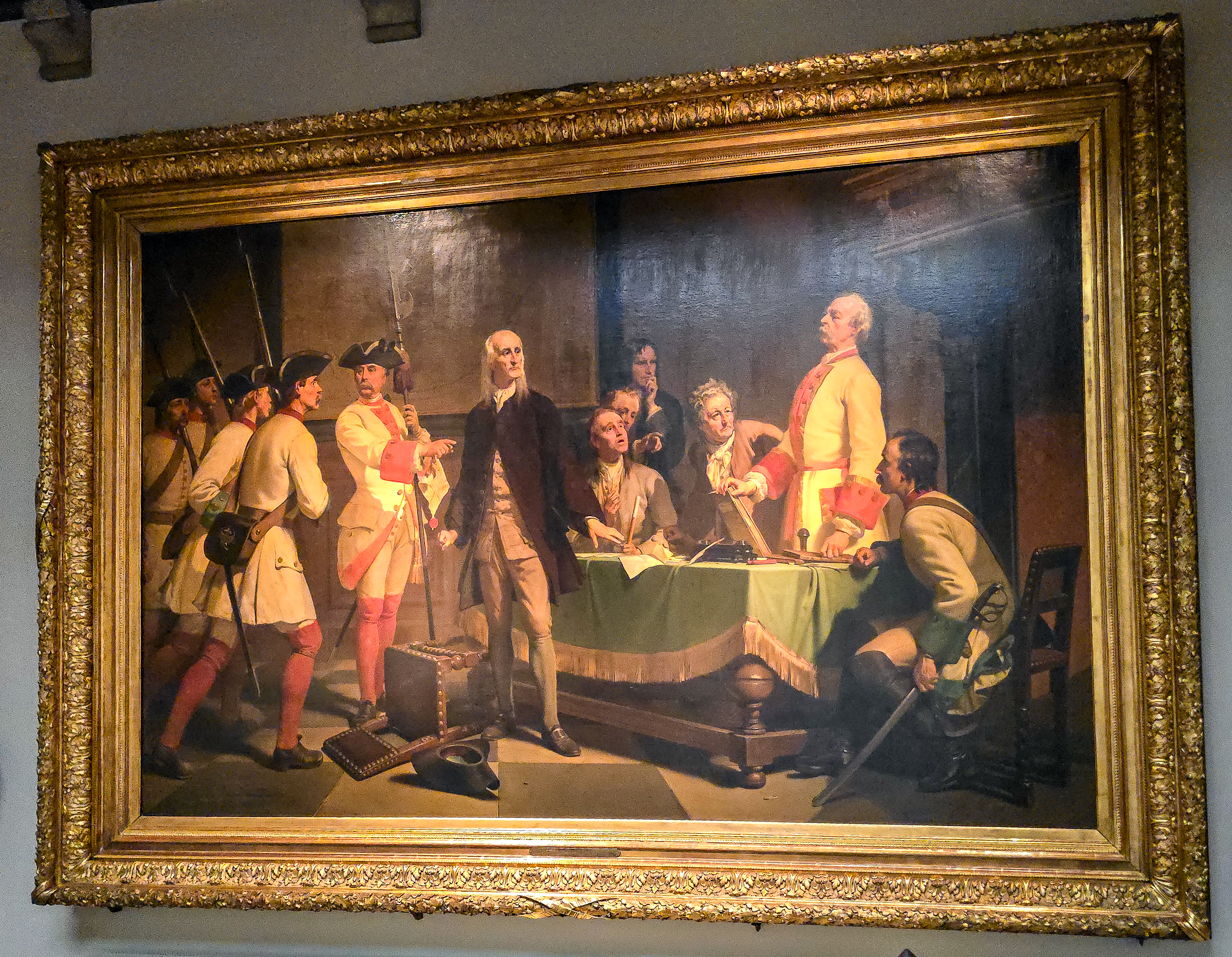
The arrest of Frans Anneesens, painting by in the Brussels City Museum by Joseph van Severdonck

Frans Anneessens (in Dutch) or François Anneessens (in French) (25 February 1660 – 19 September 1719) was dean of the Nation of St. Christopher, one of the Guilds of Brussels, Austrian Netherlands. He was beheaded on the Grand-Place/Grote Markt (Brussels' main square) because of his resistance to innovations in city government detrimental to the power of the guilds and for his suspected involvement with uprisings within the Austrian Netherlands.

== Background ==
Anneessens was as a slate cutter a member of the Nation of St. Nicholas and as a chair maker a member of the Nation of St. Christopher in Brussels. In 1689 he was chosen as the dean of the Nation of St. Christopher. In 1699 he represented his guild before the Council of Brabant to plead for the preservation of the time honoured privileges of the craft guilds of Brussels. The council rejected his plea and that of others and adopted a new regulation that curtailed the privileges of the guilds. The deans of the guilds refused to swear on this new regulation.

The end of the War of the Spanish Succession saw the Spanish Netherlands awarded to Austria. In 1716 the Austrians raised new taxes on the Flemish and Brabantine cities to fund the Dutch occupational forces installed by the Barrier Treaty and questioned their old medieval privileges. In 1717 these issues caused riots in Ghent, Antwerp, Mechelen and Brussels. The Italian Marquess de Prié, deputy for the absent governor-general, Prince Eugene of Savoy, suppressed the riots with brute force.

In the same year, the newly elected deans of the Guilds of Brussels were to swear to uphold the law, including a supplementary rider to the liberties of the city imposed in 1700. They refused to swear to uphold this last, with Anneessens apparently the ring-leader in the refusal.

To restore order de Prié ordered the arrest of those he saw to be the ringleaders in both the rioting and the refusal. Frans Anneessens was seen as the most important of these and was lured to a business conference with an Austrian colonel to discuss victuals for his regiment. There Anneessens was arrested. Anneessens and four other leaders were kept in confinement for six months. During this period they were denied contact with their families and denied Catholic services. On 12 September 1719, Anneessens was condemned to death and the four other guild leaders to perpetual banishment. The full trial records were published in two volumes in 1862–1863.

== Execution ==
The day set for Anneessens' execution was 19 September 1719. As the government feared trouble they had forced the priests to remove the ropes of the church bells and all major streets and squares were occupied by Austrian soldiery. At 8 o'clock Frans Anneessens was brought from prison, and placed on a cart while bound by his hands and feet. After reading the sentence, Anneessens refused to sign it, claiming to be innocent in the eyes of God. He was then brought to the scaffold on the Grand-Place where his wig was removed. When Anneesens tried to address the crowd, his words were drowned by drum rolls. The executioner then beheaded him with a sword.

After the execution, Anneessens body was removed by the Alexian Brothers and he was buried in the Chapel Church.

== Legacy ==
Anneessens is commemorated in Brussels with a statue, a street and a square named after him. Anneessens premetro station takes its name from the square.
