= Anspach Fountain =

Monumental fountain in Brussels, Belgium

- Fontaine Anspach (French); Anspachfontein (Dutch)
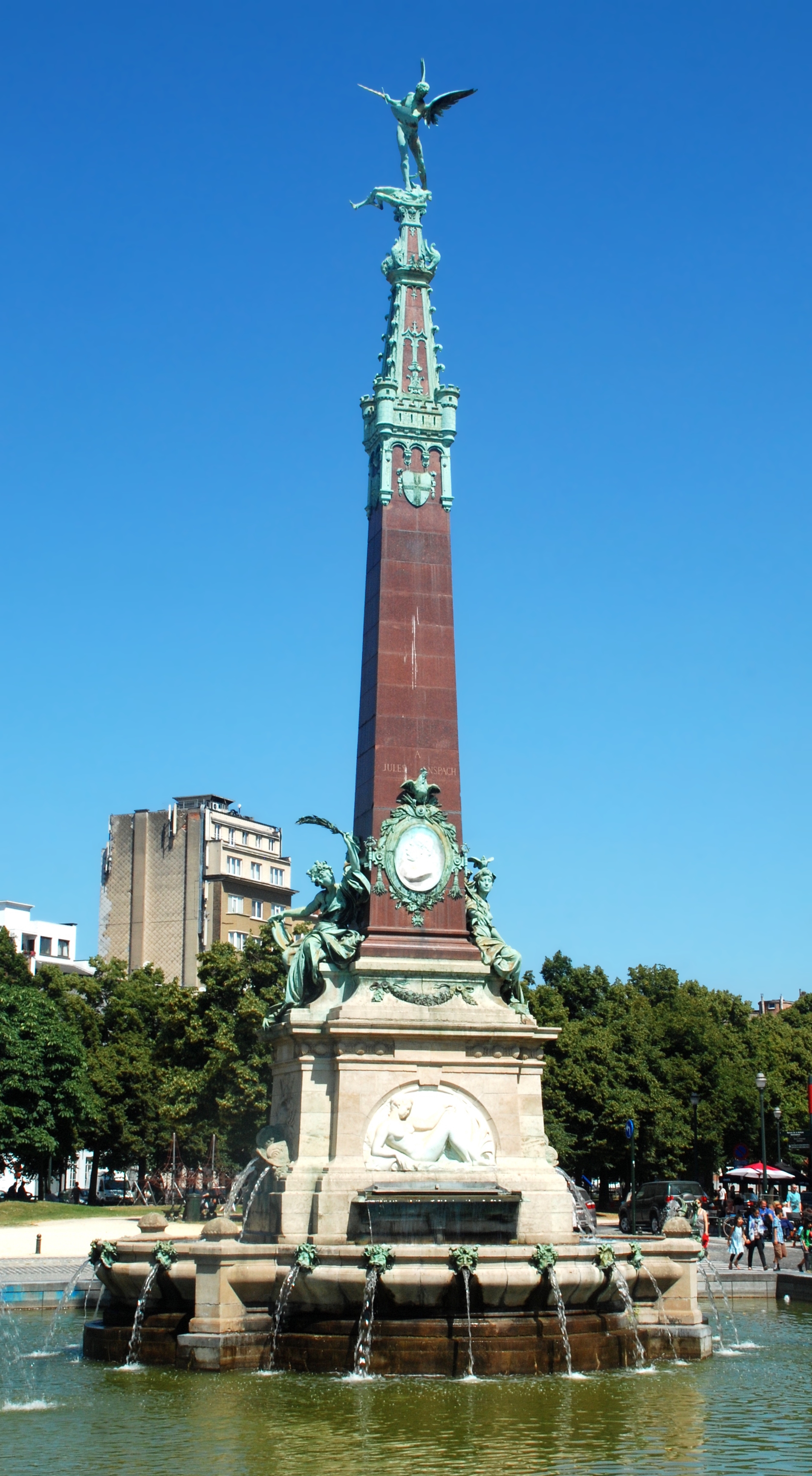
- Interactive map of Anspach Fountain
- Location: Square des Blindés / Pantsertroepensquare; 1000 City of Brussels, Brussels-Capital Region, Belgium
- Coordinates: 50°51′13″N 4°20′49″E
- Designer: Charles-Émile Janlet
- Type: Fountain
- Material: Blue stone, pink granite and bronze
- Height: 20 m (66 ft)
- Beginning date: 1895
- Completion date: 1897
- Dedicated to: Jules Anspach
- Dismantled date: 1973

The Anspach Fountain (French: Fontaine Anspach; Dutch: Anspachfontein) is an eclectic-style fountain-obelisk erected between 1895 and 1897 in the centre of the Place de Brouckère/De Brouckèreplein in Brussels, Belgium. Designed by the architect Charles-Émile Janlet, it is dedicated to the memory of Jules Anspach, a former mayor of the City of Brussels.

The monument was dismantled in 1973 following construction work on the Brussels Metro. It was reinstalled in 1981 in its current location on the Square des Blindés/Pantsertroepensquare, between the Quai aux Briques/Baksteenkaai and the Quai au Bois à Brûler/Brandhoutkaai, in the Quays or Sainte-Catherine/Sint-Katelijne Quarter.

== History ==
=== Construction ===
The Anspach Fountain was designed by the architect Charles-Émile Janlet and erected between 1895 and 1897 in the centre of the Place de Brouckère/De Brouckèreplein, left empty by the destruction of the former Temple of the Augustinians. The fountain pays homage to Jules Anspach, mayor of the City of Brussels from 1863 to 1879, as well as promoter of the covering of the river Senne (1867–1871) and the creation of the Central Boulevards. This monument stood exactly in the axis of the Boulevard Anspach/Anspachlaan, like a regulator of traffic at the birth of the fork between the Boulevard Émile Jacqmain/Émile Jacqmainlaan and the Boulevard Adolphe Max/Adolphe Maxlaan. It was considered in its time the most beautiful and the grandest in the city.

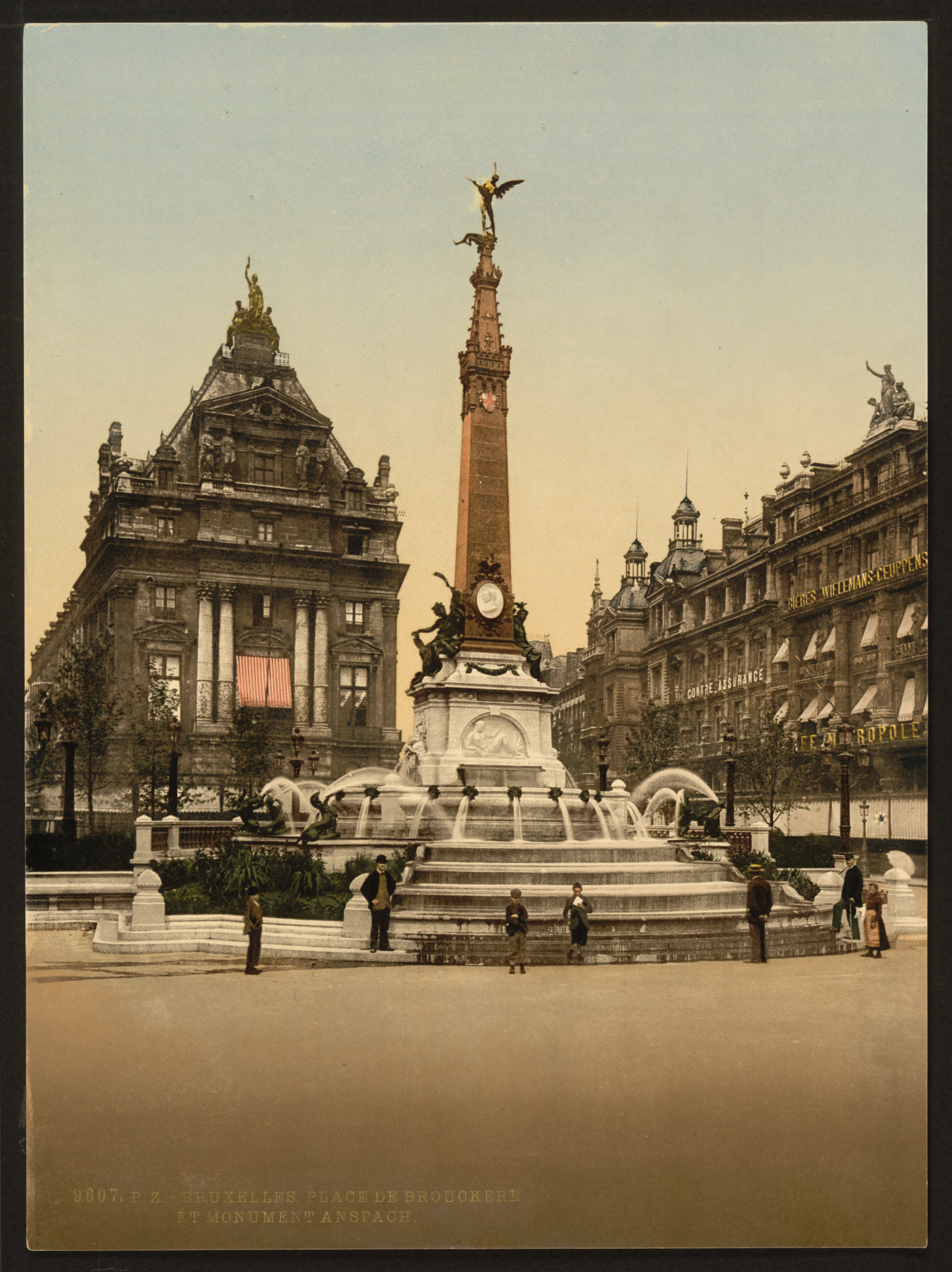
The Place de Brouckère/De Brouckèreplein with the Anspach Fountain in the late 19th century

=== Disassembly and reassembly ===
The fountain was dismantled and removed in 1973 to make way for access to De Brouckère metro station, with the pieces temporarily stored in a warehouse. The authorities had promised to put the monument back in place after the works, but it was eventually reinstalled in May 1981 in a basin that occupies the space between the Quai aux Briques/Baksteenkaai and the Quai au Bois à Brûler/Brandhoutkaai, in the Quays or Sainte-Catherine/Sint-Katelijne Quarter, some 700 metres (2,300 ft) from the Place de Brouckère.

== Description ==
The eclectic-style monument, 20 metres (66 ft) high, is made up of a Swedish granite obelisk surmounting a blue stone pedestal surrounded by a basin. Inseparable from the monumental perspective of the boulevards—and yet moved following the works of the metro—it is, through its dedication and former location, a tribute to Anspach.

=== Pedestal ===
The blue stone pedestal is adorned with a marble bas-relief depicting an allegory of The Covering of the Senne, represented by a naked woman seated in a tunnel, the work of the sculptor Paul De Vigne, as well as dolphin spitters made by the sculptor Georges Houtstont. The pedestal is surrounded by a four-lobed basin decorated with mascaron spitters also made by Houtstont (Note: The basin has two large lobes, each decorated with six mascaron spitters, and two smaller lobes, each decorated with four mascaron spitters.) and six chimeras sculpted by Godefroid Devreese. (Note: Nodaways, there are only four left to adorn the water feature.) On the pedestal, there are inscriptions recalling the names of the artists and the circumstances of the monument's construction.

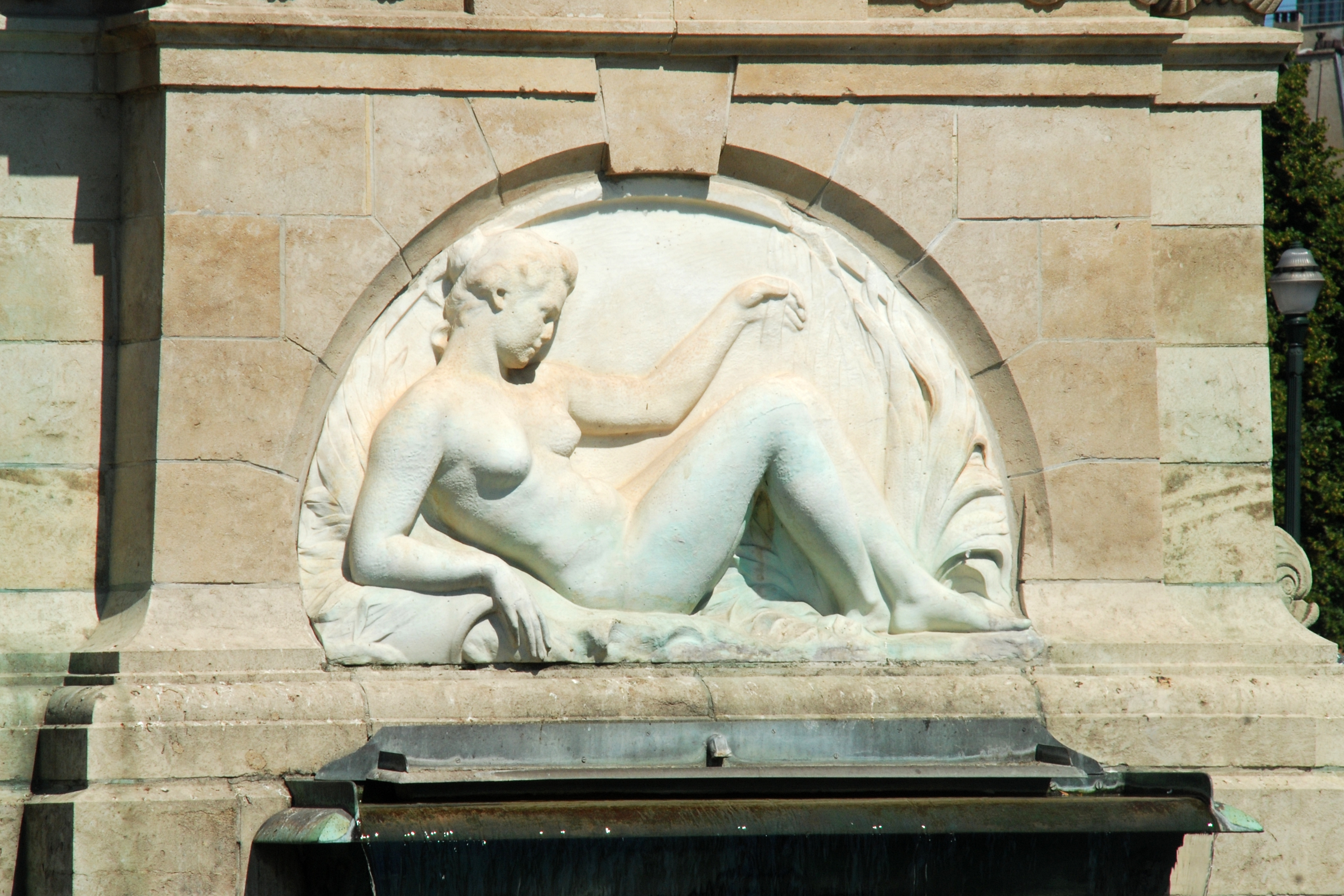
The Covering of the Senne by Paul De Vigne

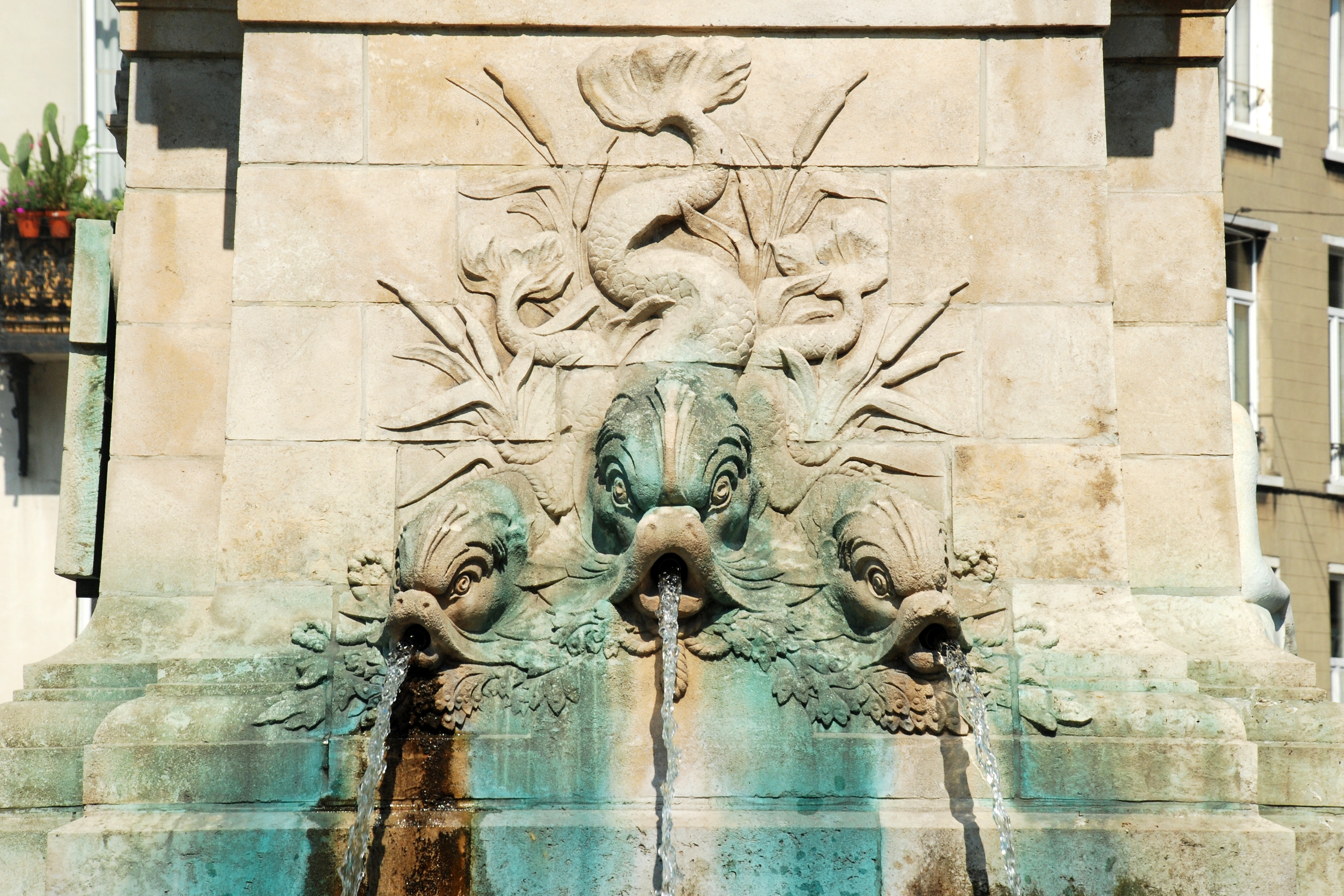
Dolphin by Georges Houtstont

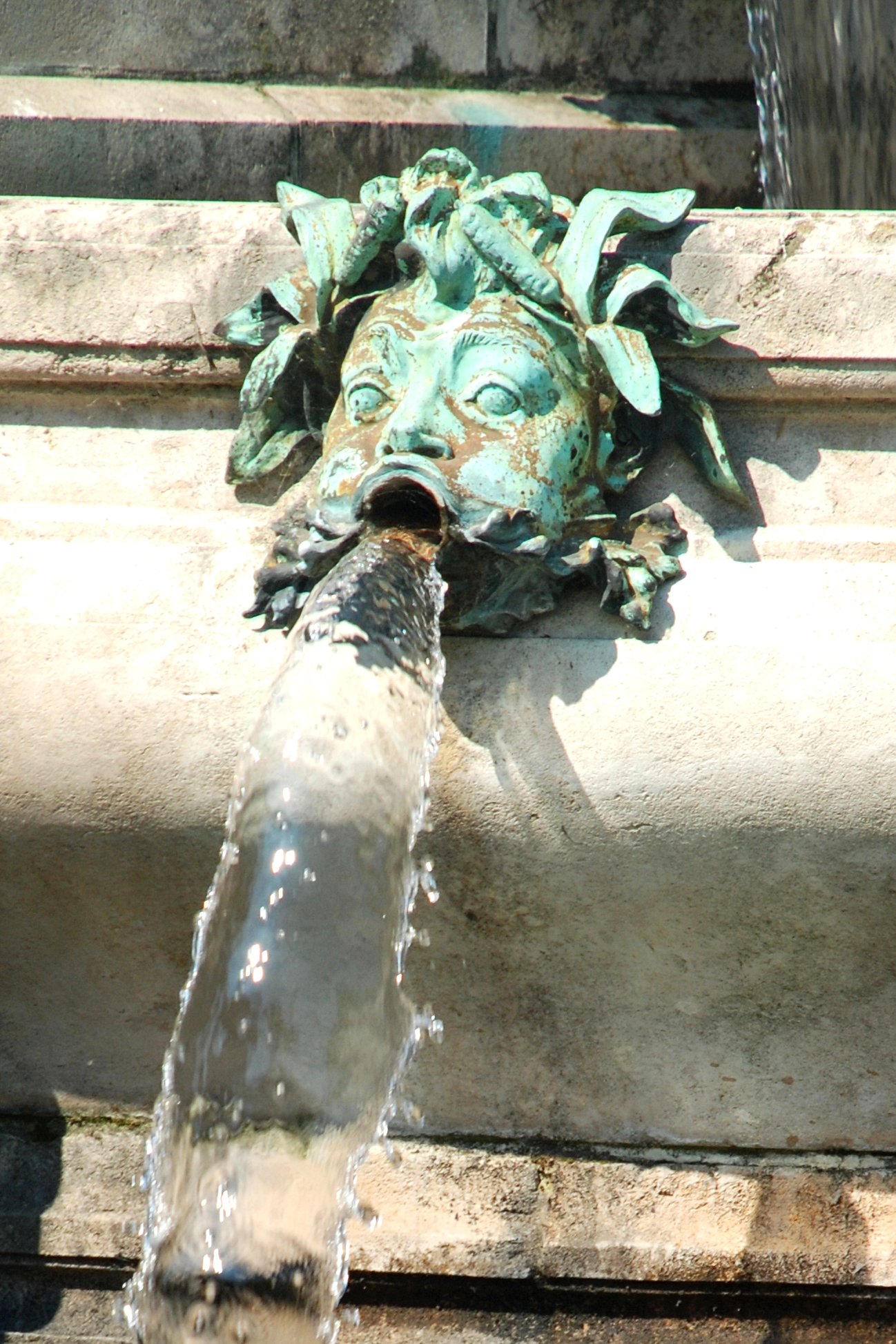
Mascaron by Pierre-Jean Braecke

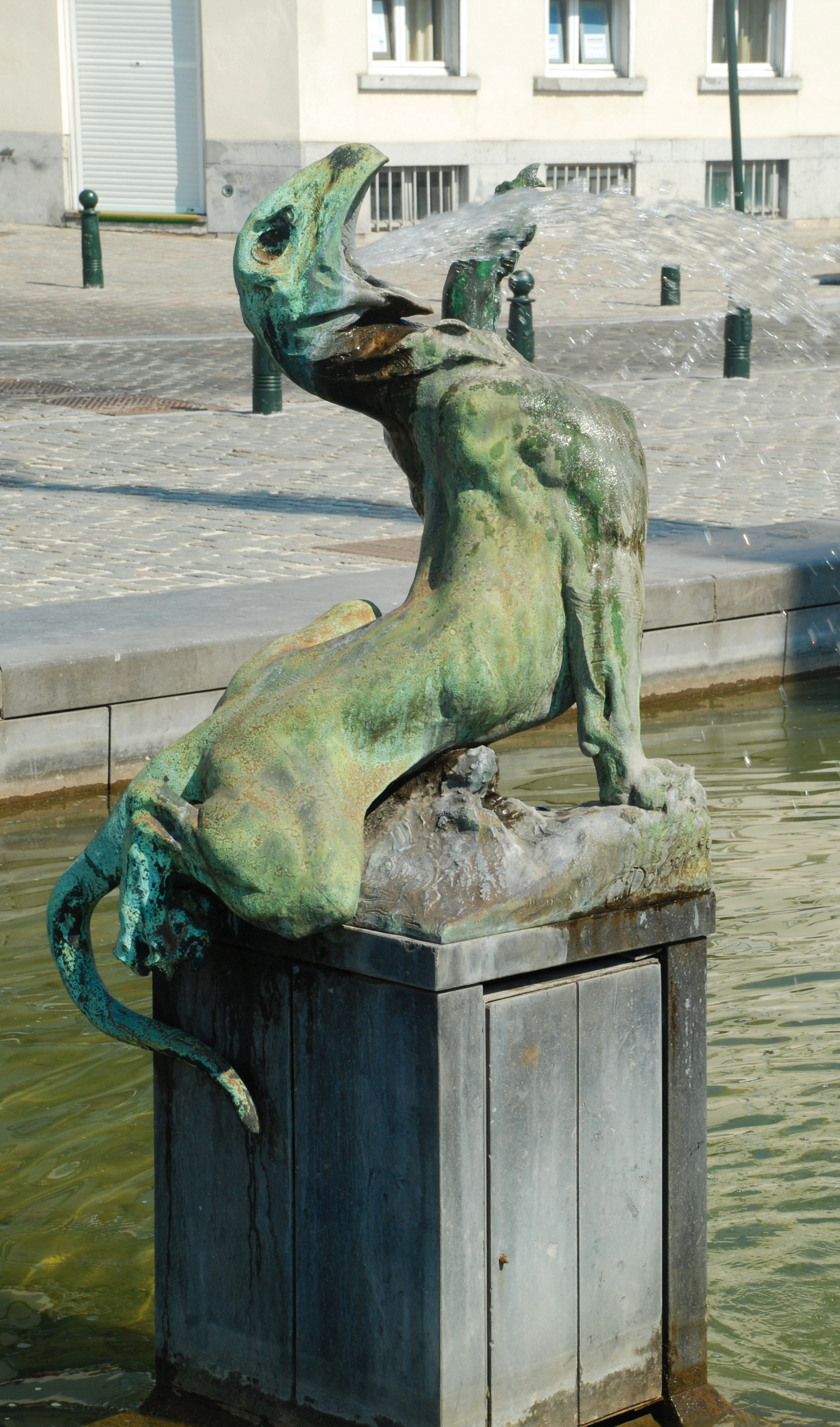
Chimera by Godefroid Devreese

=== Obelisk ===
The pink granite obelisk, 11 metres (36 ft) high, bears at its base a white marble medallion with Anspach's image by Paul De Vigne, surrounded by bronze allegories of The Municipal Judiciary and The Grateful City of Brussels by the sculptor Julien Dillens. The Municipal Judiciary's hair is decorated with oak leaves, a symbol of power. In her left hand, she holds a rudder, an allusion to the city's government, around which a snake coils, symbolising the prudence with which the mayor manages the city. The owl on her head represents wisdom and the scales at her feet justice. The Grateful City of Brussels bears a crown in the shape of walls, an allusion to the fact that Brussels was a fortified city in the Middle Ages. Anspach's medallion is surmounted by a rooster, symbolising vigilance.

The top of the obelisk bears a bronze ornament made by Pierre-Jean Braecke, depicting the town in medieval times, surmounted by a Gothic spire decorated with finials and ending with an effigy of Saint Michael, the patron saint of the City of Brussels, slaying a dragon or demon. The sculptor introduced an innovation into the traditional iconography of Saint Michael by representing him naked, following the example of ancient art. The upper part is also decorated with four coats of arms, referring to the historical Brussels' Guilds of Crossbowmen, Harquebusiers, Archers and Fencers.

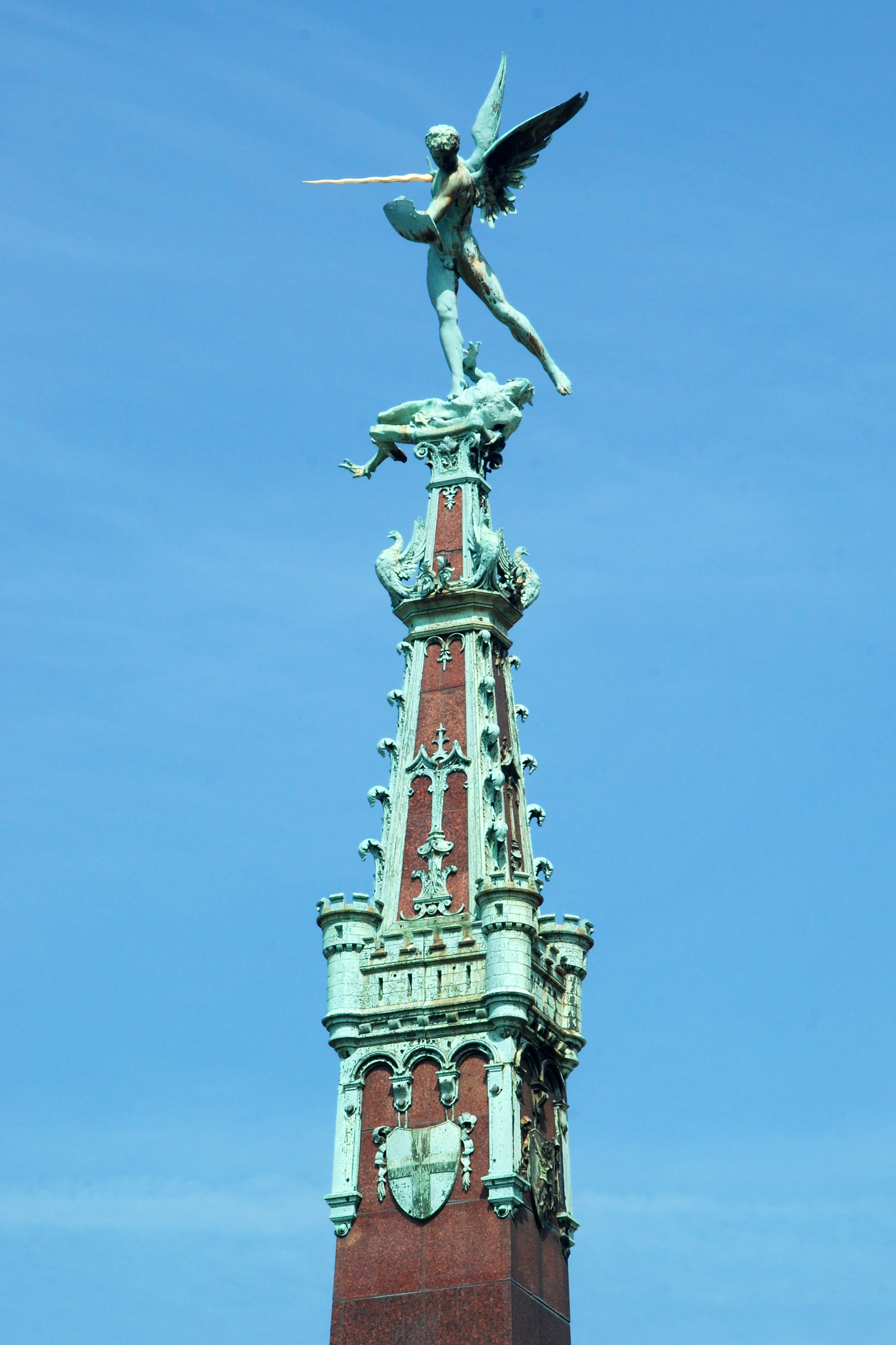
Statue of Saint Michael slaying the dragon by Pierre-Jean Braecke

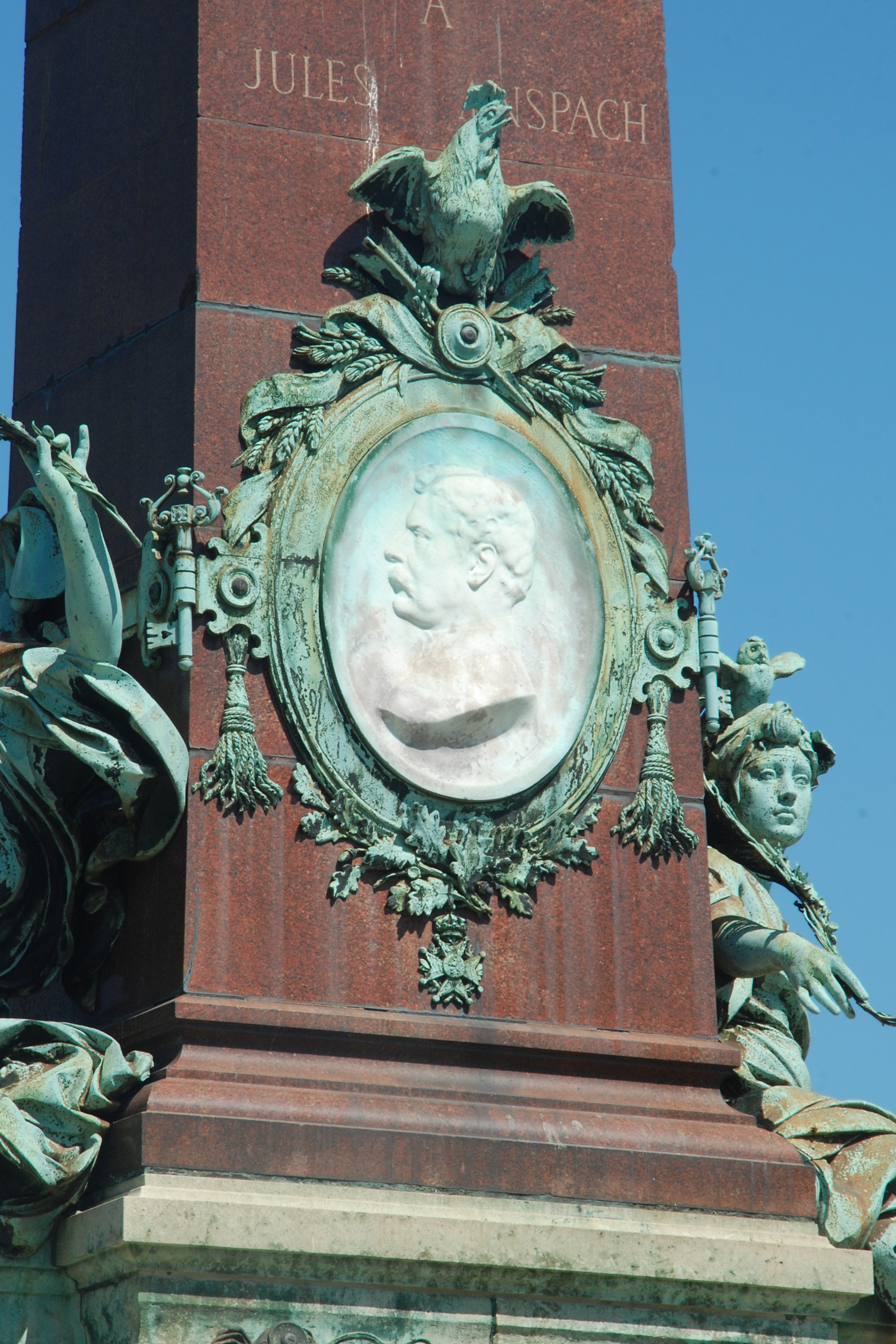
White marble medallion with Jules Anspach's effigy by Paul De Vigne

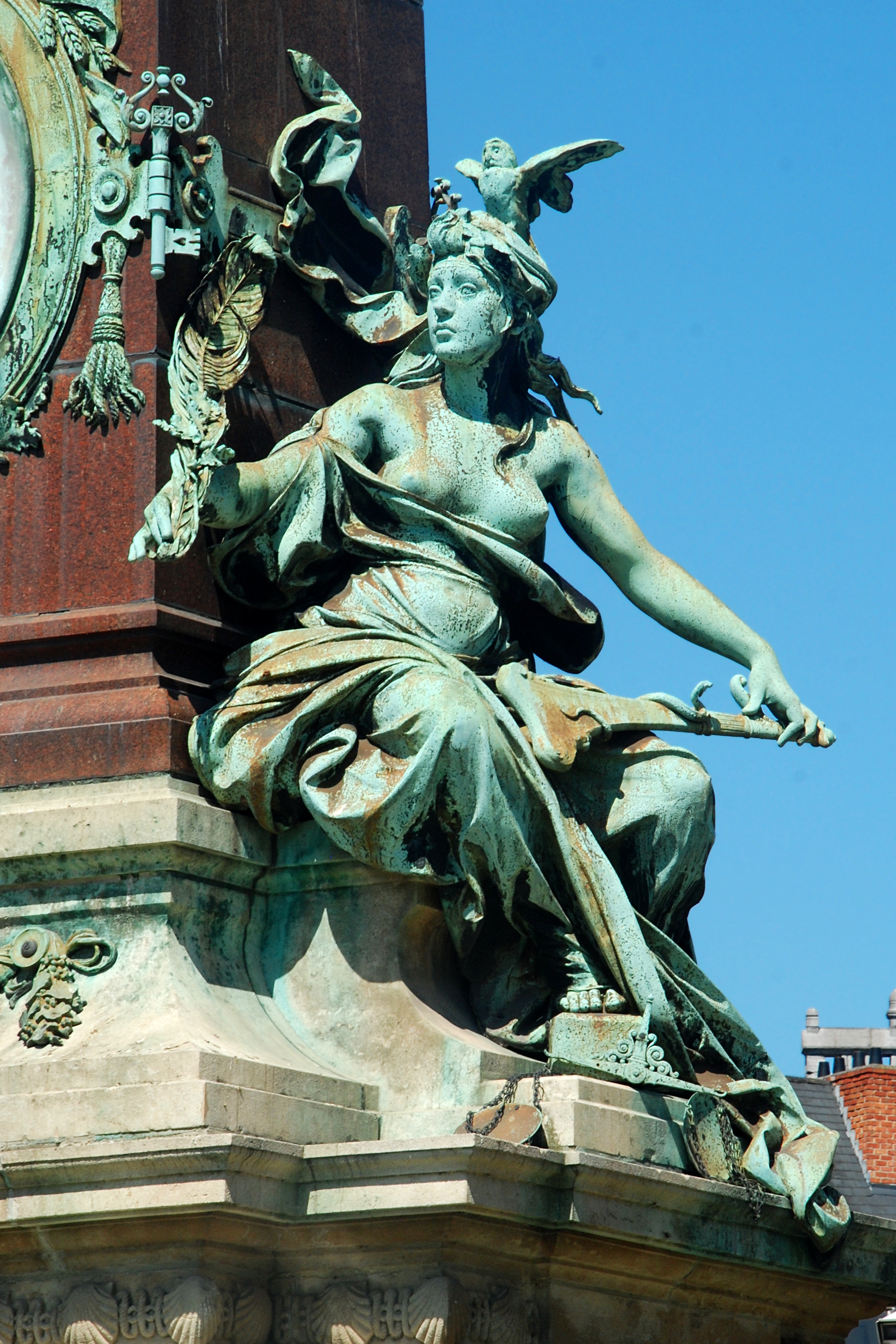
The Municipal Judiciary by Julien Dillens

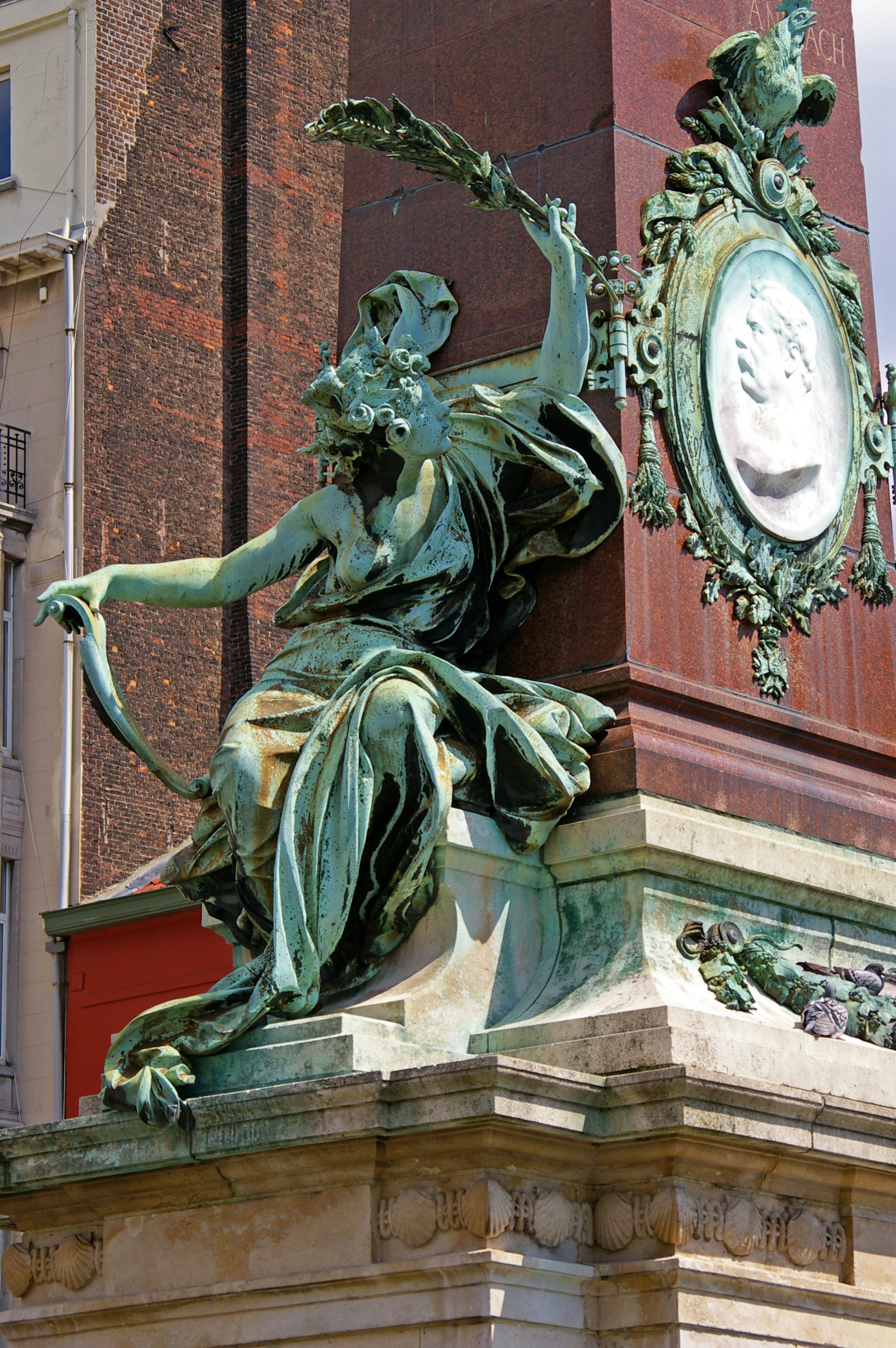
The Grateful City of Brussels by Dillens

== See also ==
- Sculpture in Brussels
- History of Brussels
- Culture of Belgium
- Belgium in the long nineteenth century
