= Senne (river) =

River in Belgium

Senne (French); Zenne (Dutch)
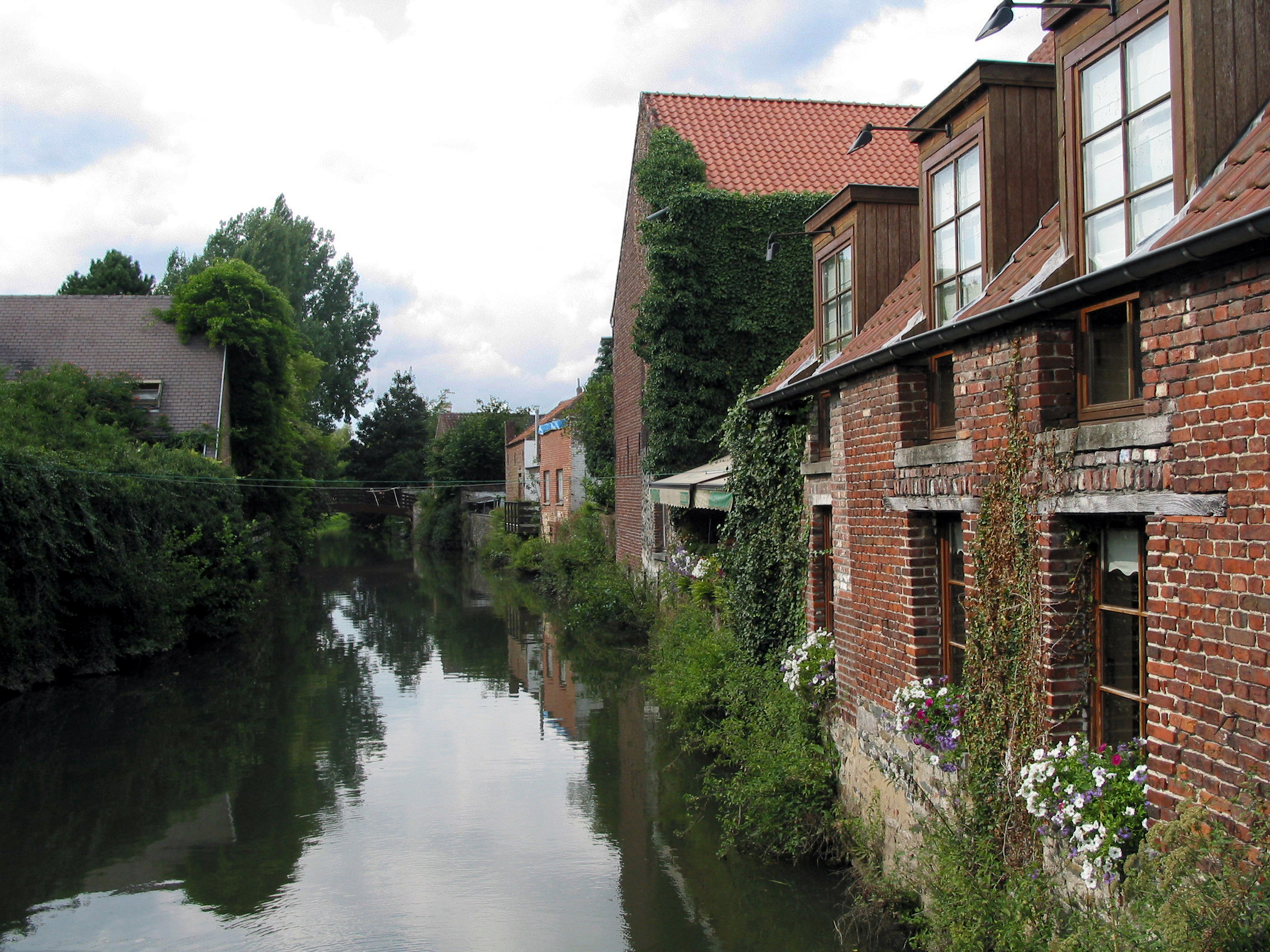
- The Senne in Rebecq

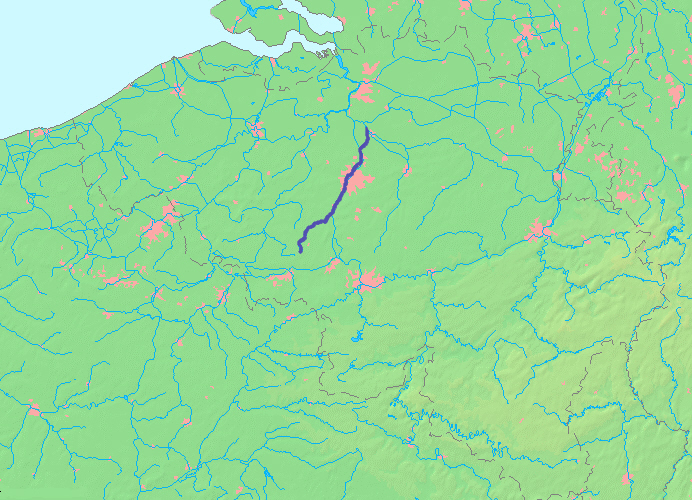

Location
- Country: Belgium

Physical characteristics
- Mouth
  - coordinates: 51°03′54″N 04°25′48″E
- Length: 103 km (64 mi)

Basin features
- Progression: Dyle→ Rupel→ Scheldt→ North Sea

The Senne (French, pronounced [sɛn]) or Zenne (Dutch, pronounced [ˈzɛnə]) is a small river that flows through Brussels, Belgium. It is an indirect tributary of the Scheldt, through the Dyle and the Rupel. Its source is in the village of Naast near the municipality of Soignies. After a total length of 103 km (64 mi), it joins the Dyle at Zennegat in Battel, north of the municipality of Mechelen, only a few hundred metres before the Dyle itself joins the Rupel. The Woluwe and the Maelbeek are some of the tributaries of the Senne.

== Covering and treatment ==
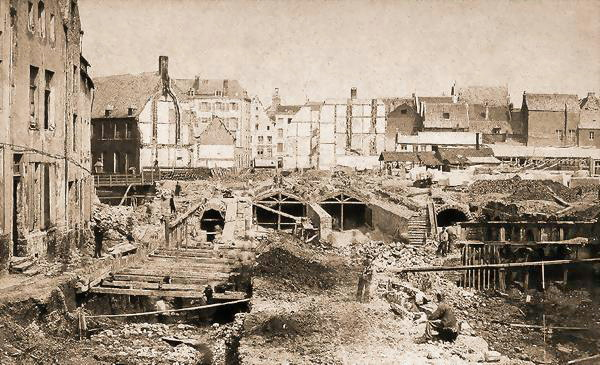
Covering of the Senne in Brussels in 1867

The 1837 course of the Senne superimposed on Brussels' modern downtown

In Brussels, the Senne had become a serious health hazard by the second half of the 19th century, and from 1867 to 1871, under the tenure of the city's then-mayor, Jules Anspach, its entire course through the urban area was completely covered over. This allowed urban renewal and the construction of modern buildings of Haussmann-esque style along grand central boulevards, characteristic of downtown Brussels today. The river is still visible in the outskirts of Brussels and outside the urban area, though within the city, it now runs mostly underneath the Small Ring (Brussels' inner ring road).

The Senne was notorious for being one of Belgium's worst polluted rivers, despite work done to the sewers and spillways in the Brussels–Charleroi Canal, since all effluents from the Brussels-Capital Region emptied into it without treatment. The drainage into the canal was not able to completely stop the floods that regularly affected certain outer areas of the city. In March 2007, the completion of new sewage treatment plants began to remediate this problem. However, in December 2009, the Brussels-North treatment plant of Aquiris was temporarily and abruptly shut down, creating a political and ecological crisis.

== Cultural impact ==
The yellow iris became used as the emblem of the Brussels-Capital Region due to its habitat in the marshy plains around the river and a stylised version is featured on its official flag. The unique seasonal wild yeasts of the Senne river valley are used in the production of the regional lambic style of beer. Brasserie de la Senne is a brewery named for the river.

Despite the covering of the Senne resulting in the river being all but invisible in central Brussels, it has had a cultural impact on the city. A nickname for residents of the city, zinneke, meaning "mutt" or "bastard" in the Brusselian dialect, is taken from the stray dogs that hung around the streets by the Lesser Senne (a tangent canal of the river) until the end of the 19th century. The name was revived at the start of the 21st century with the creation of the Zinneke Parade, a multicultural biennial event in Brussels, as well as Het Zinneke, sometimes called Zinneke Pis, a bronze sculpture depicting an urinating dog.

== Gallery ==
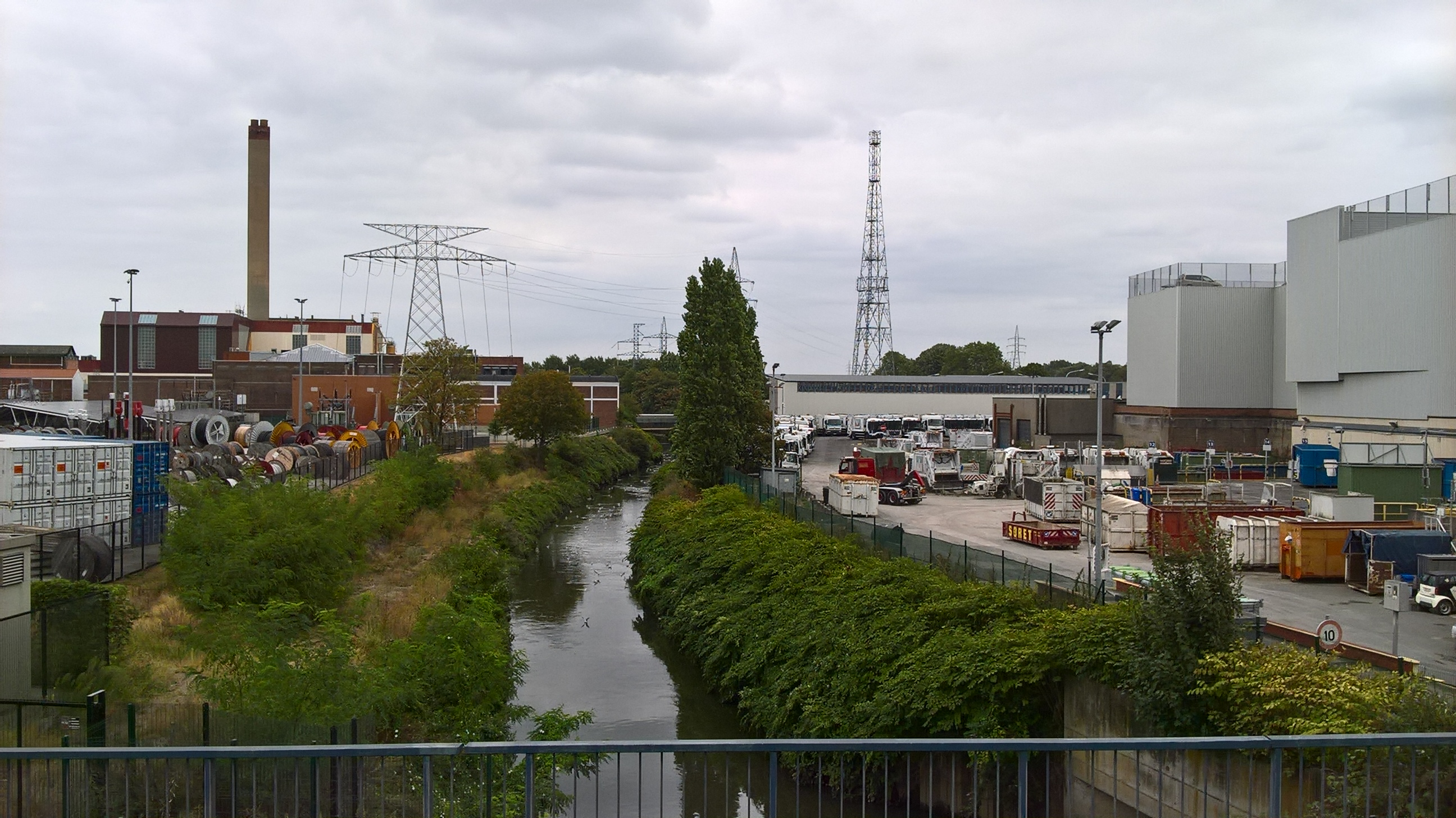
North-eastern view from the bridge of the Rue du Rupel/Rupelstraat in Brussels where the Senne leaves the city's canalisation

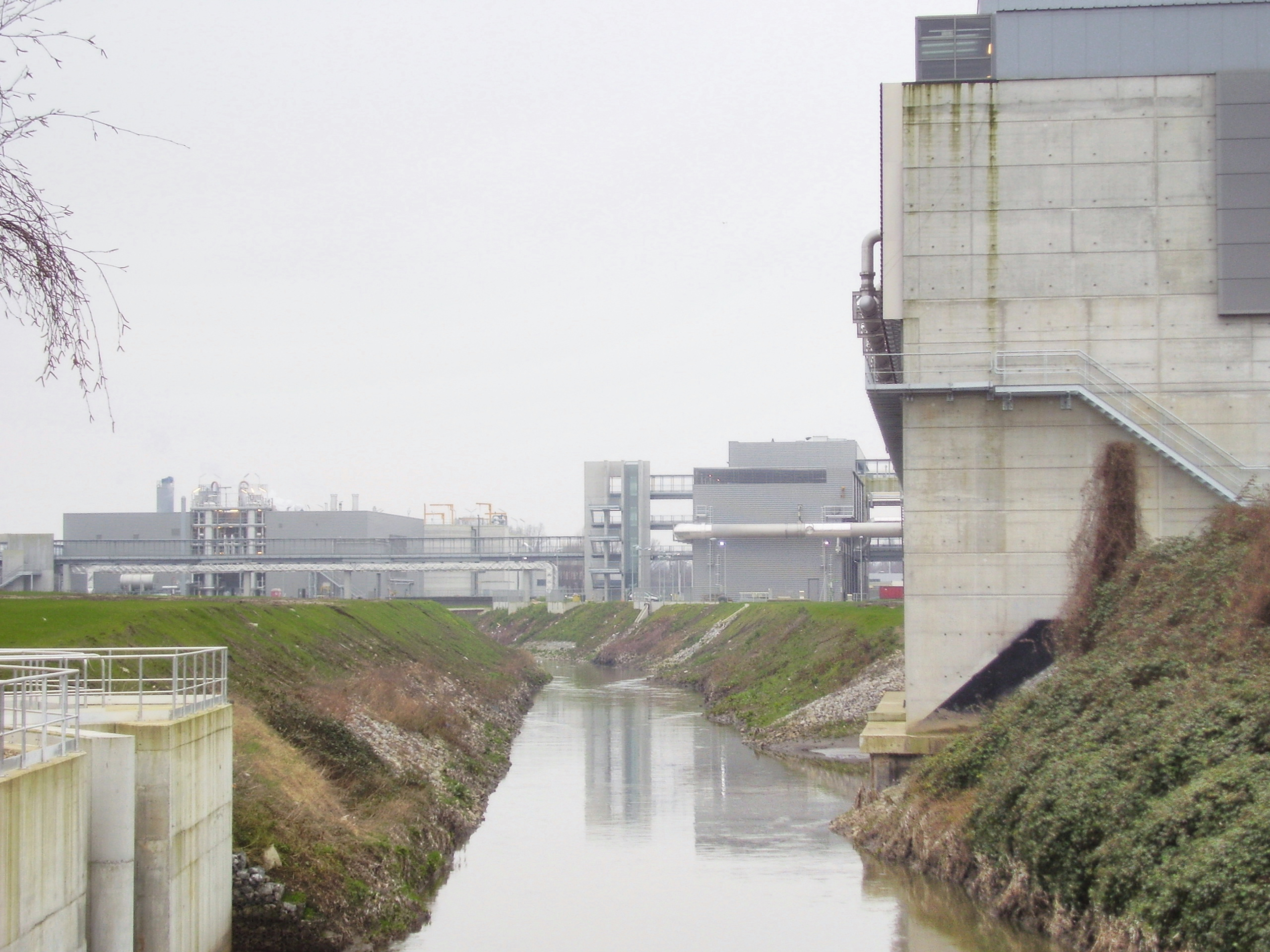
The Senne leaving the Brussels-North water treatment plant near the Buda Bridge in Haren

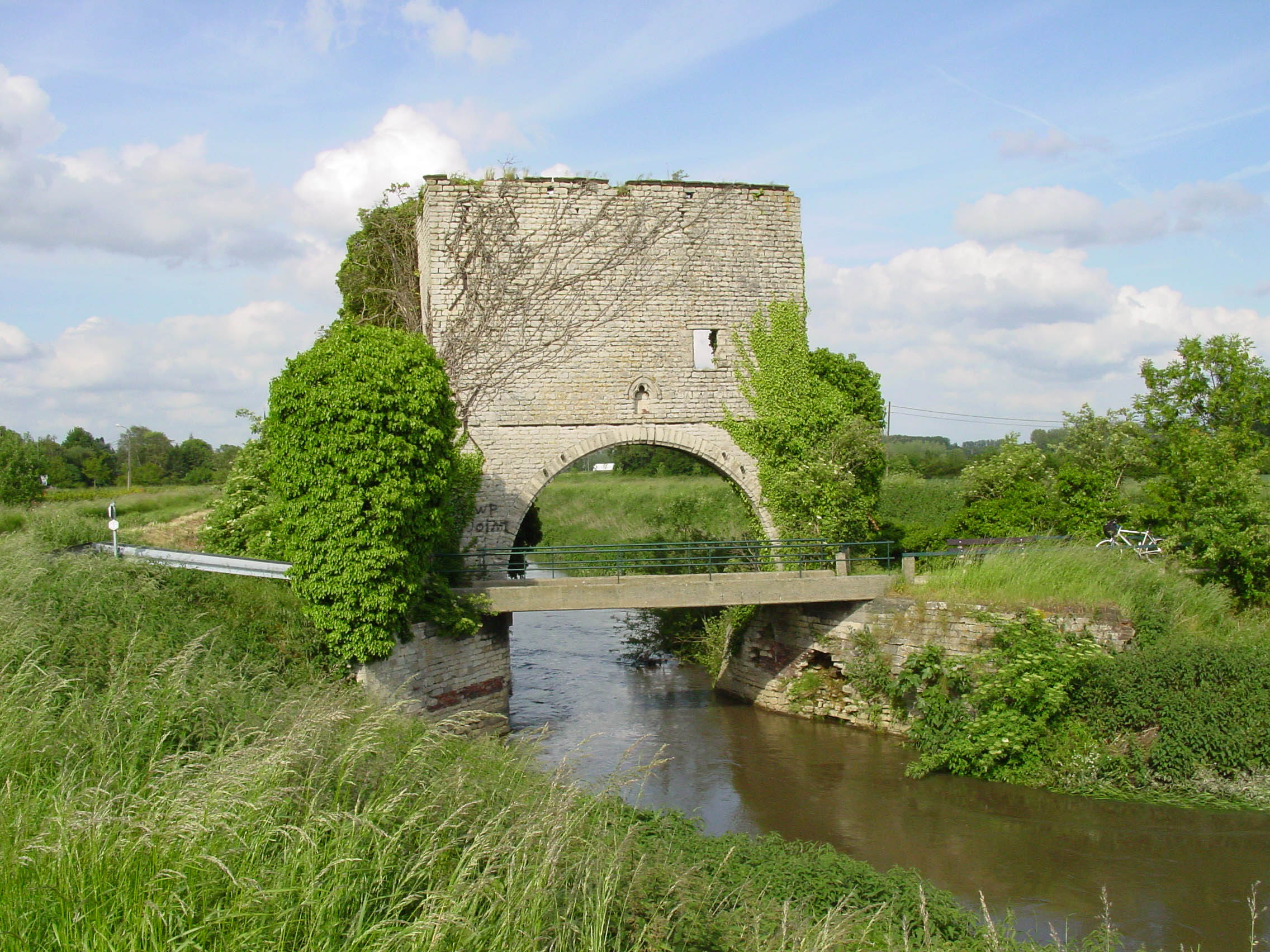
Remains of a sluice tower, quay and watermill over the Senne in the fields in Weerde

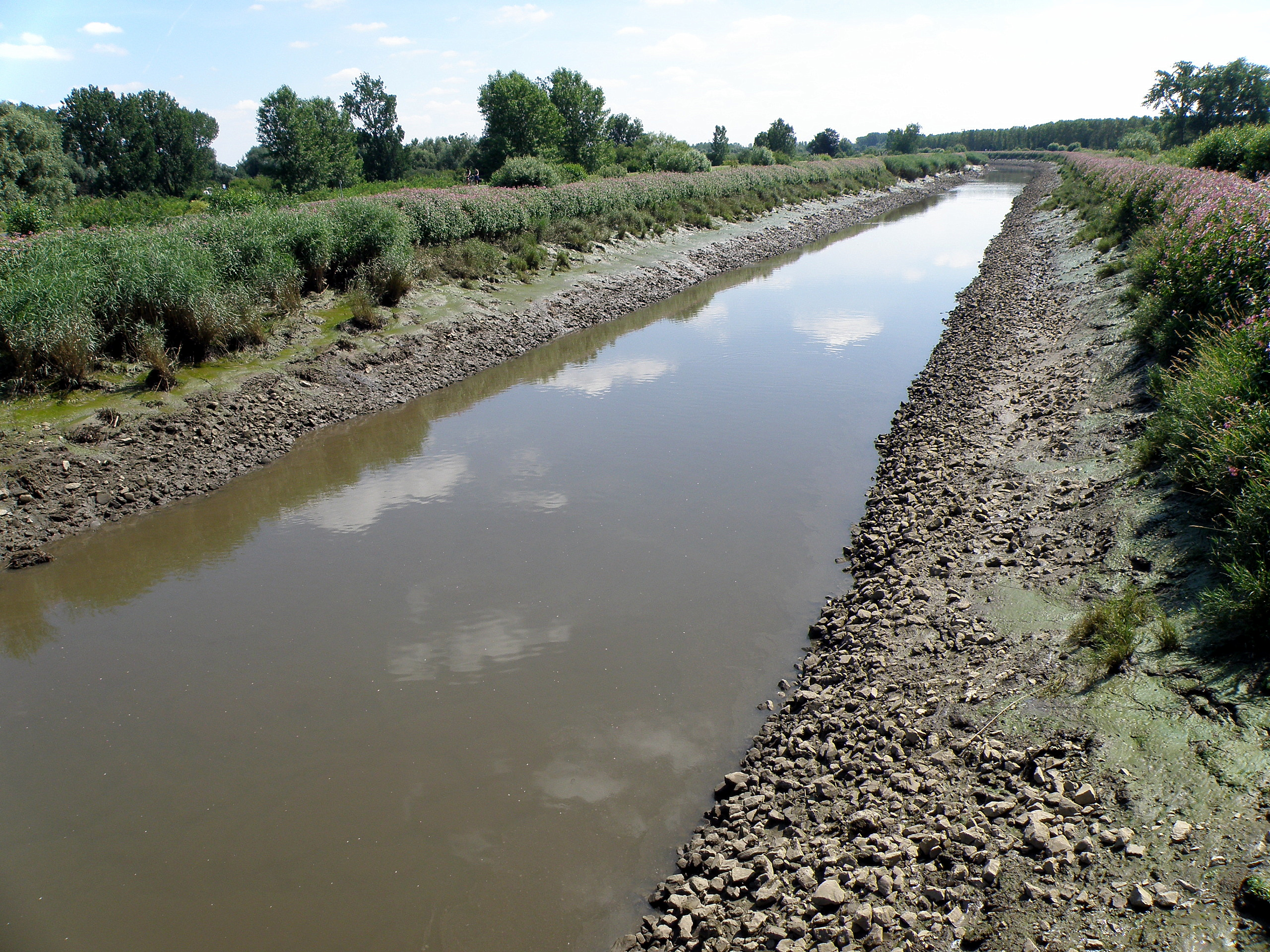
The Senne at Zennegat in Battel (north of Mechelen), close to its confluence with the Dyle

== See also ==
- List of rivers of Belgium
