= Covering of the Senne =

Covering of the main river of Brussels, Belgium

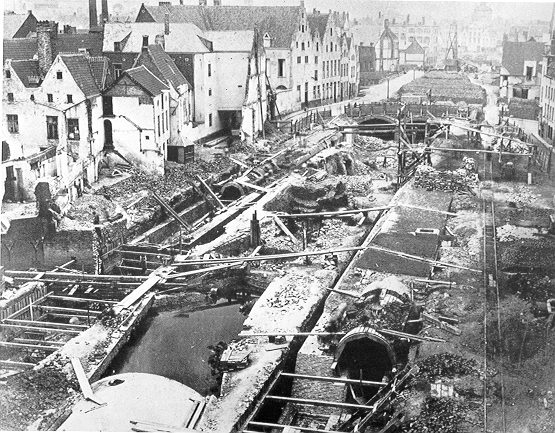
The covering of the Senne in Brussels

The covering of the Senne (French: Voûtement de la Senne; Dutch: Overwelving van de Zenne) was the covering and later diverting of the main river of Brussels, Belgium, and the construction of public buildings and major boulevards in its place. Carried out between 1867 and 1871, it is one of the defining events in the history of Brussels.

The Senne/Zenne (French/Dutch) was historically the main waterway of Brussels, but it became more polluted and less navigable as the city grew. By the second half of the 19th century, it had become a serious health hazard and was filled with garbage and decaying organic matter. It was heavily polluted, and it flooded frequently, inundating the lower town and the working class neighbourhoods that surrounded it.

Numerous proposals were made to remedy this problem, and in 1865, the City of Brussels' mayor, Jules Anspach, selected a design by the architect Léon Suys to cover the river and build a series of grand central boulevards and public buildings. The project faced fierce opposition and controversy, mostly due to its cost and the need for expropriation and demolition of working-class neighbourhoods. The construction was contracted to a British company, but control was returned to the government following an embezzlement scandal. This delayed the project, but it was still completed in 1871. Its completion allowed the construction of the modern buildings and boulevards that are focal to downtown Brussels today.

In the 1930s, plans were made to cover the Senne along its entire course within the greater Brussels area, which had grown significantly since the 19th-century covering. By 1955, the course of the Senne was diverted to the downtown's peripheral boulevards. In 1976, the disused tunnels were converted into the North–South Axis of Brussels' underground tram system, the premetro. Actual purification of the waste water from the Brussels-Capital Region was not completed until March 2007, when two treatment stations were built, thus finally cleansing the Senne after centuries of problems.

== The Senne in Brussels ==
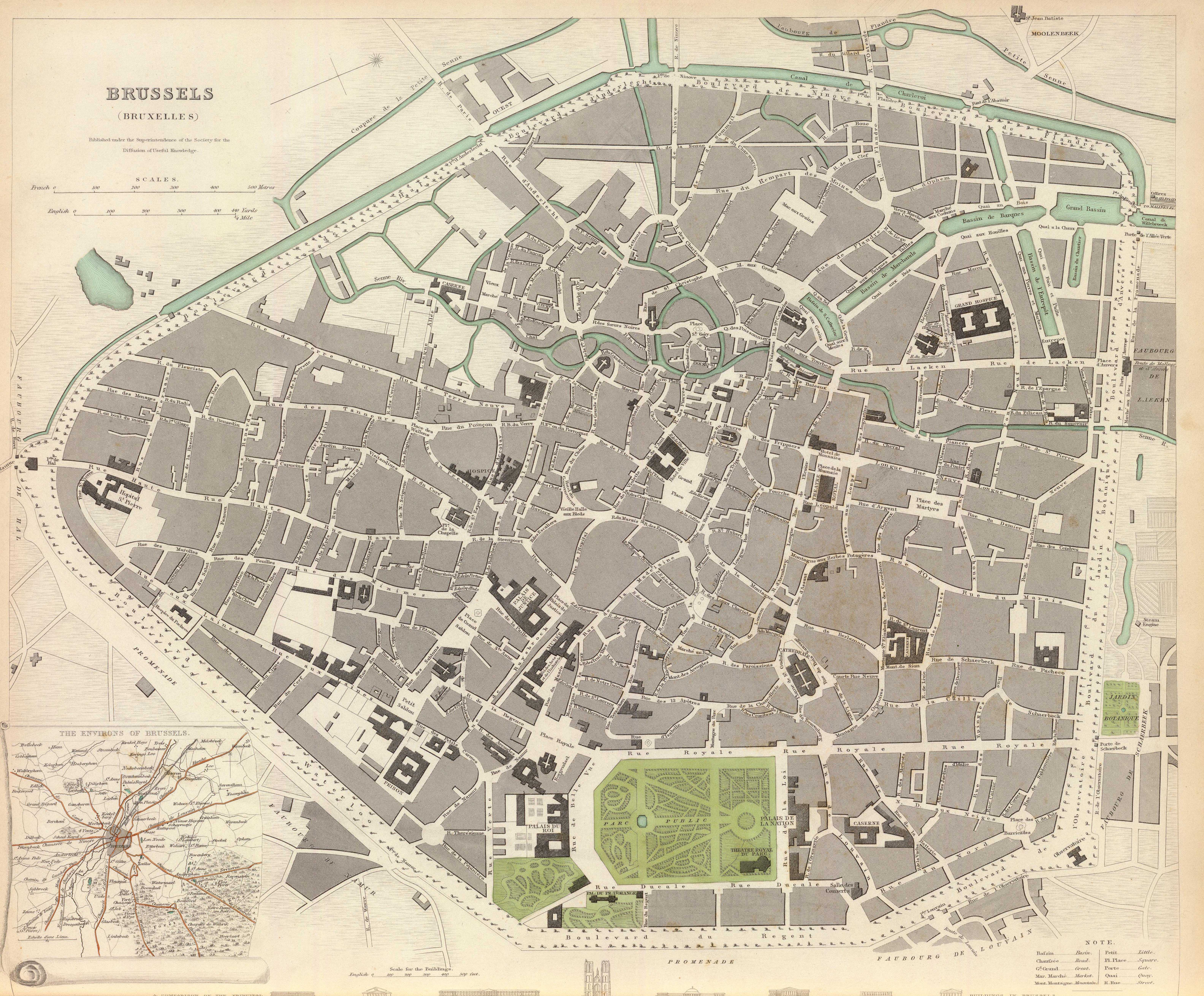
Map of Brussels with the Senne in 1837; north is roughly to the right

At the beginning of the 19th century, Brussels was still in many ways a medieval city. The Royal Quarter in the historic upper town, inhabited mainly by the nobility and the richer members of the bourgeoisie, was upscale and modern. The rest of the city, however, in particular the lower town, located in the western half of the Pentagon, in the valley of the Senne river, was densely populated and industrial, characterised by an illogical street layout, back alleys, narrow streets, and numerous dead-ends.

The Senne split into two branches in Anderlecht, penetrating the Pentagon, the former site of the second city walls, in two places. The main and more southern arm entered through the Greater Sluice Gate, near today's Brussels-South railway station. The smaller northerly arm entered through the Lesser Sluice Gate, near today's Ninove Gate. The courses of the two traced a meandering path through the city centre, forming several islands, the largest of which was known as Saint-Géry/Sint-Goriks Island. The two branches met up on the north side of Saint-Géry Island, exiting the Pentagon one block east of the Antwerp Gate. A man-made arm, called the "Lesser Senne" (French: Petite Senne, Dutch: Kleine Zenne), continued on the borders of the Pentagon in the former moat, outside the sluice gates. It followed the Brussels–Charleroi Canal before rejoining the main part of the Senne north of the city.

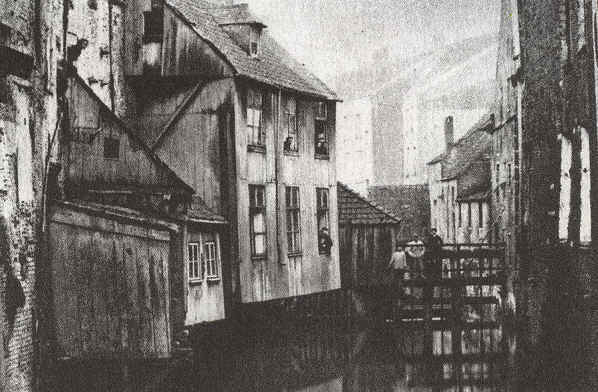
Many unsanitary and unsafe wooden add-ons projected over the river in the lower town.

Still described, in the 18th century, as a river with a "useful and pleasant course", the Senne had long since lost its usefulness as a navigable waterway, having been replaced by the first half of the 19th century by the Brussels–Charleroi Canal and the Brussels–Scheldt Maritime Canal (also known as the Willebroek Canal). The Senne had always been a river with an inconsistent flow, often overflowing its banks. In times of heavy rainfall, even the sluice gates were unable to regulate the flow of the river, which was often swollen by numerous creeks flowing down from higher ground. Making matters worse, within the city, the river's bed was narrowed by encroaching construction due to demographic pressure. The supports of numerous unregulated bridges impeded water flow and caused water levels to rise even further, exacerbated by a riverbed of accumulated waste.

During dry periods, however, much of the Senne's water was diverted for the needs of the city's populace, as well as to maintain the water level in the Charleroi Canal. This left a flow too feeble to evacuate the filthy water, leaving the sewage, garbage, detritus and industrial waste that had been dumped into the river to accumulate in the stagnant water. The Senne, which a witness in 1853 described as "the most nauseous little river in the world", had become an open-air sewer spreading pestilential odours throughout the city. Early in the second half of the 19th century, Brussels saw numerous dry periods, floods and a cholera epidemic, caused as much by the river itself as by the poverty and the lack of hygiene and potable water in the lower city. This forced the governments of the Province of Brabant and the City of Brussels to act.

== Attempts at purification ==
The 1837 course of the Senne superimposed on the modern downtown

The first studies and propositions to clean up the river date back to 1859, and between 1861 and 1864, the Brussels authorities assigned successive commissions of engineers to examine possible solutions. Dozens of different ideas were submitted, many of which were completely unfeasible. Several of them proposed diverting large amounts of cleaner water from other rivers upstream to dilute the Senne, while greatly improving the drainage system in the city. Other proposals involved diverting the Senne's main course completely to the Lesser Senne, which would then be enlarged and thus be more useful for boat traffic and mills. Others considered any sort of sanitisation impossible, and proposed covering the Senne without greatly changing its course. Among these was a proposal to double the size of the underground drainage tunnels, creating space for a subterranean railroad tunnel. The idea was ahead of its time, and would be implemented a century later with the North–South connection.

In 1865, King Leopold II, speaking to the City of Brussels' then-mayor, Jules Anspach, expressed the wish that Brussels "will succeed in getting rid of this cesspool called the Senne" before the end of his reign. In October of that year, the municipal council adopted a project submitted by the architect Léon Suys, which had Anspach's backing. The plan involved suppressing the Senne's secondary arm by closing the Lesser Sluice Gate and rectifying the sinuous course of its main arm between Brussels-South railway station and the north of the city. This main branch would be channelled into tunnels, to be placed directly beneath a long, straight 30-metre-wide (100 ft) boulevard, stretching from the Greater Sluice Gate to the Temple of the Augustinians (now the Place de Brouckère/De Brouckèreplein) before splitting into two. One branch was to head towards Brussels-North railway station and the present-day Place Charles Rogier/Karel Rogierplein, the other towards the Antwerp Gate, thus forming a long, narrow "Y" shape.

Anspach's backing of Suys' proposal was a calculated decision, as he had radical plans to transform the city. Anspach saw the proposal as an unexpected boon, as it allowed him to accomplish several of his goals at once. It had long been his ambition to transform the impoverished lower city into a centre of business and commerce, suitable for a modern capital (Belgium had declared its independence in 1830, with Brussels its capital). He wanted to attract the middle class, most of whom had left the dingy downtown for the cleaner suburbs, including the Leopold Quarter (now often called the European Quarter) and the Avenue Louise/Louizalaan, causing a large loss in tax revenue for the city. The elimination of the numerous alleys and dead-ends in the lower town in favour of a large, straight, wide, open-air boulevard, linking the two rapidly growing train stations, seemed both a necessity and an opportunity to beautify the city and improve both traffic circulation and hygiene.

== Controversy and opposition ==
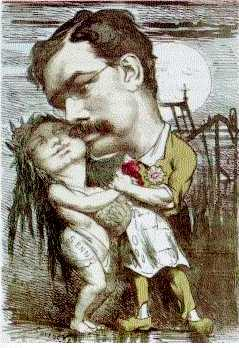
Jules Anspach and the Senne, editorial cartoon from L'Espiègle, 1868

The Belgian Parliament had passed a law in 1858 allowing the expropriation of privately owned land by the government when the land was to be used for the "greater good". This could be done even if the project was still speculative in nature, and allowed for more land to be taken beyond what was strictly necessary for a project. The city expropriated large swathes of the lower town, counting on reselling the land for a profit, which, after the project was complete, would be on a grandiose modern boulevard in an upper-class neighbourhood. The selling of land after the project's completion was seen as a way of financing the project itself. That the lower town's poorer residents were forced away into other already overcrowded districts or into the surrounding suburbs did not trouble the upper classes very much, as the displaced residents did not pay taxes or have the right to vote.

Even after Suys' proposal was officially adopted in 1865, Anspach faced strong opposition to the project. This opposition came first from engineers who felt that the covering was incompatible with Brussels' geology, would accumulate potentially dangerous gases and would not be able to handle enough water to prevent floods. Others opposed to the project complained about the soaring taxes resulting from its high cost, poor compensation for seized property and the lack of public input into the project. The press accused Anspach of being responsible for demolishing Brussels' old town, and published numerous caricatures mocking him.

A liberal, Anspach feared the government's weakness and rigidity and therefore gave the work of covering the river to a private British company, the Belgian Public Work Company (the English name was used), which was created for the task. The contract was signed on 15 June 1866, and the contractor was given three years for the undertaking. However, partway through construction, it was forced to relinquish control to the City of Brussels after an embezzlement scandal in which a company director, Frédéric Doulton, allegedly attempted to steal 2.5 million Belgian francs from the company. Anspach only barely kept his office in the 1869 by-elections.

== Demolition and construction ==
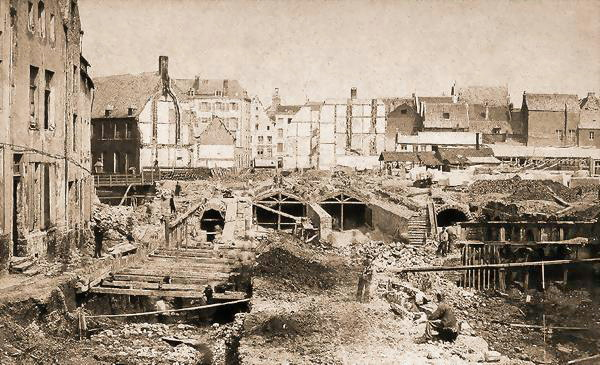
The beginning of the vaulting and construction of the sewers in 1867

The covering of the river itself, by far the largest operation, absorbed two-thirds of the subsidies granted by the public authorities—the Belgian state, the Province of Brabant and the City of Brussels—amounting to 18 million Belgian francs. (Note: This amount is roughly equivalent to €78 million in 2025 when taking into account inflation.) The city's financial resources for public works were temporarily monopolised by the operation. Now in sole control of the works, the city had to rely on the sub-contractors working on the project to see it through to completion.

The expropriation procedure of the first 1,100 houses located on the route was long and laborious, requiring an individual assessment of each building. The gigantic work, involving thousands of workers, began on 13 February 1867. From 1867 to 1871, the river was temporarily diverted and much of the old city centre was opened up. To prevent the water from rising with each shovel stroke, wells had to be installed at regular intervals, then the water pumped out to lower the water table below the apron. Excluding the important sewers built upriver and downriver in the adjacent suburbs, the covered section itself was 2.2 kilometres (1.4 mi) in length. Constructed from bricks, the covering consisted of two parallel 6-metre-wide (20 ft) tunnels, and a set of two lateral drainage pipes, each taking in waste water from its respective side of the street.

There were several technical difficulties that delayed the covering, many of which were due to Brussels' geology, though they were not as bad as some engineers had forecast. The embezzlement scandal also caused a significant delay in construction, largely due to the change in control. In spite of this, the project was completed in 1871, with the municipal council ceremonially opening the reconstructed sluice gates on 30 November. The work's effectiveness was soon put to the test. After a minor flood was stopped in 1873, torrential rains in 1876 brought the river's flow to 85 m^{3} (3,000 cu ft) without apparent disturbances.

== The new central boulevards ==
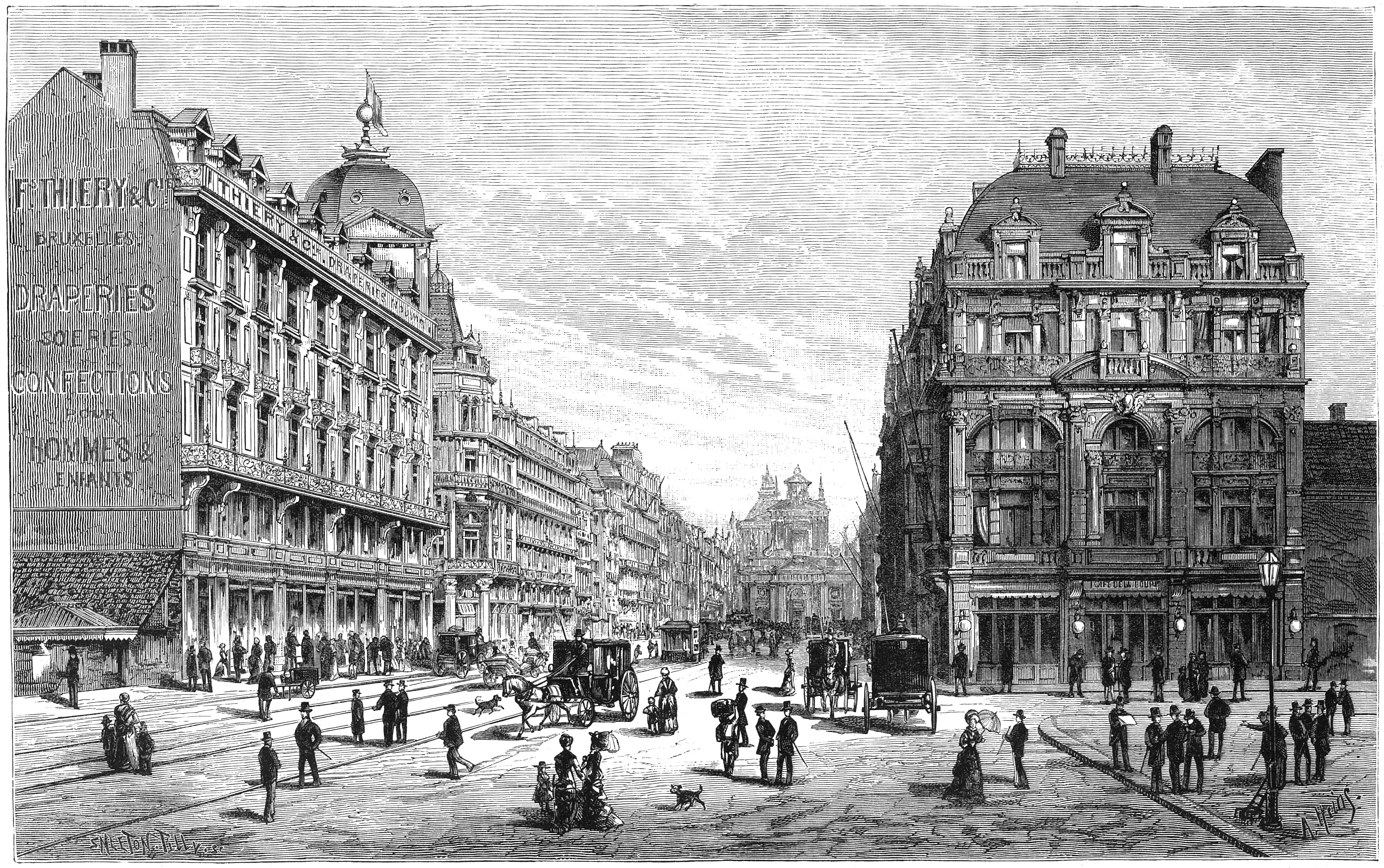
The Boulevard Anspach/Anspachlaan in 1880, etching by Armand Heins from L'Illustration nationale

The series of boulevards created by the project—the Boulevard du Hainaut/Henegouwenlaan (now the Boulevard Maurice Lemonnier/Maurice Lemonnierlaan), the Boulevard Central/Centraallaan (now the Boulevard Anspach/Anspachlaan), the Boulevard du Nord/Noordlaan (now the Boulevard Adolphe Max/Adolphe Maxlaan), and the Boulevard de la Senne/Zennelaan (now the Boulevard Émile Jacqmain/Émile Jacqmainlaan)—were laid out between 1869 and 1871, and were progressively opened to traffic from 1871 to 1873. The opening of these new routes offered a more efficient way to get into Brussels' lower town than the cramped streets such as the Rue du Midi/Zuidstraat, the Rue des Fripiers/Kleerkopersstraat and the Rue Neuve/Nieuwstraat, and helped revitalise the town's lower quarters.

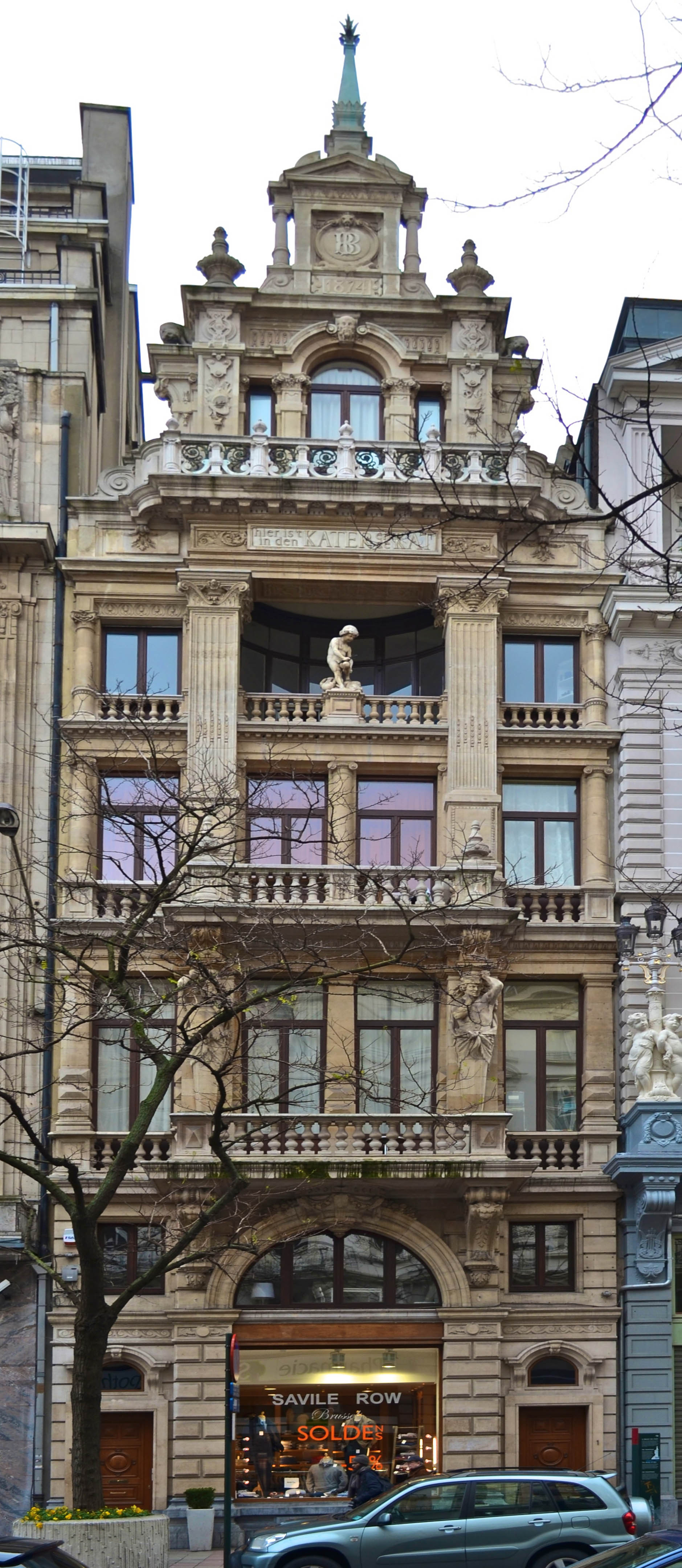
The House of Cats by Henri Beyaert, which won first prize in the 1876 contest

In order to accomplish this revitalisation and attract investment, public buildings were constructed as part of Léon Suys' massive programme of beautification of the city centre, including the Bourse Palace (1868–1873). The vast Central Halls (French: Halles Centrales, Dutch: Centrale Hallen), a notable example of metallic architecture, located between the Rue des Halles/Hallenstraat and the Rue de la Vierge Noire/Zwarte Lievevrouwstraat, replaced unhygienic open-air markets, though they were torn down in 1958. The monumental fountain at the Place Fontainas/Fontainasplein, which was to break the boulevards' uniformity, was abandoned for budgetary reasons.

The construction of private buildings on the boulevards and surrounding areas took place later. Brussels' middle class continued to prefer living in new suburbs rather than the cramped areas of the city centre. Besides, the high prices of the land (expected to finance part of the construction costs) and the high rents were not within the means of the lower classes. Moreover, life in apartments was no longer desirable for residents of Brussels, who preferred to live in single family homes. For these reasons, the buildings constructed by private citizens had difficulty finding buyers.

To give builders an incentive to create elaborate and appealing façades on their works, two architectural competitions were organised, first in the period 1872–1876 and again in 1876–1878. Great freedom was given to the architects; no unity of style was sought nor imposed (other than a minimum height of 15 metres (49 ft) to avoid speculation) and the monumental composition adopted a de facto eclectic approach throughout the immense perspective of the boulevards. The first prize of 20,000 Belgian francs for the 1872–1876 competition was awarded to the architect Henri Beyaert who designed the Maison des Chats or Hier is't in den kater en de kat (loosely, "House of Cats") on the Boulevard du Nord. Nonetheless, it took another twenty years, until 1895, for buildings to solidly line the boulevards.

The former Temple of the Augustinians, built at the beginning of the 17th century in the Brabantine Baroque style after designs by Jacob Franquart, was the only remaining part of a convent destroyed in 1796 by French revolutionaries. After having been used as a Protestant church from 1815 to 1830, it subsequently saw use as a concert hall, a commercial exchange, and a post office. At the centre of the Place de Brouckère/De Brouckèreplein, the church's façade was intended by Suys to be one of the new boulevards' focal points. The work to cover the river, which nearly surrounded the church, preserved the building's integrity at great trouble and expense, but it was finally demolished in 1893, its style no longer popular with the people and its presence unsuitable for the area. The church was replaced by a fountain-obelisk dedicated to the memory of Jules Anspach. Its façade's masonry, however, was preserved, being disassembled and reconstructed as the façade of the Church of the Holy Trinity in the municipality of Ixelles.

== Diversion and treatment ==
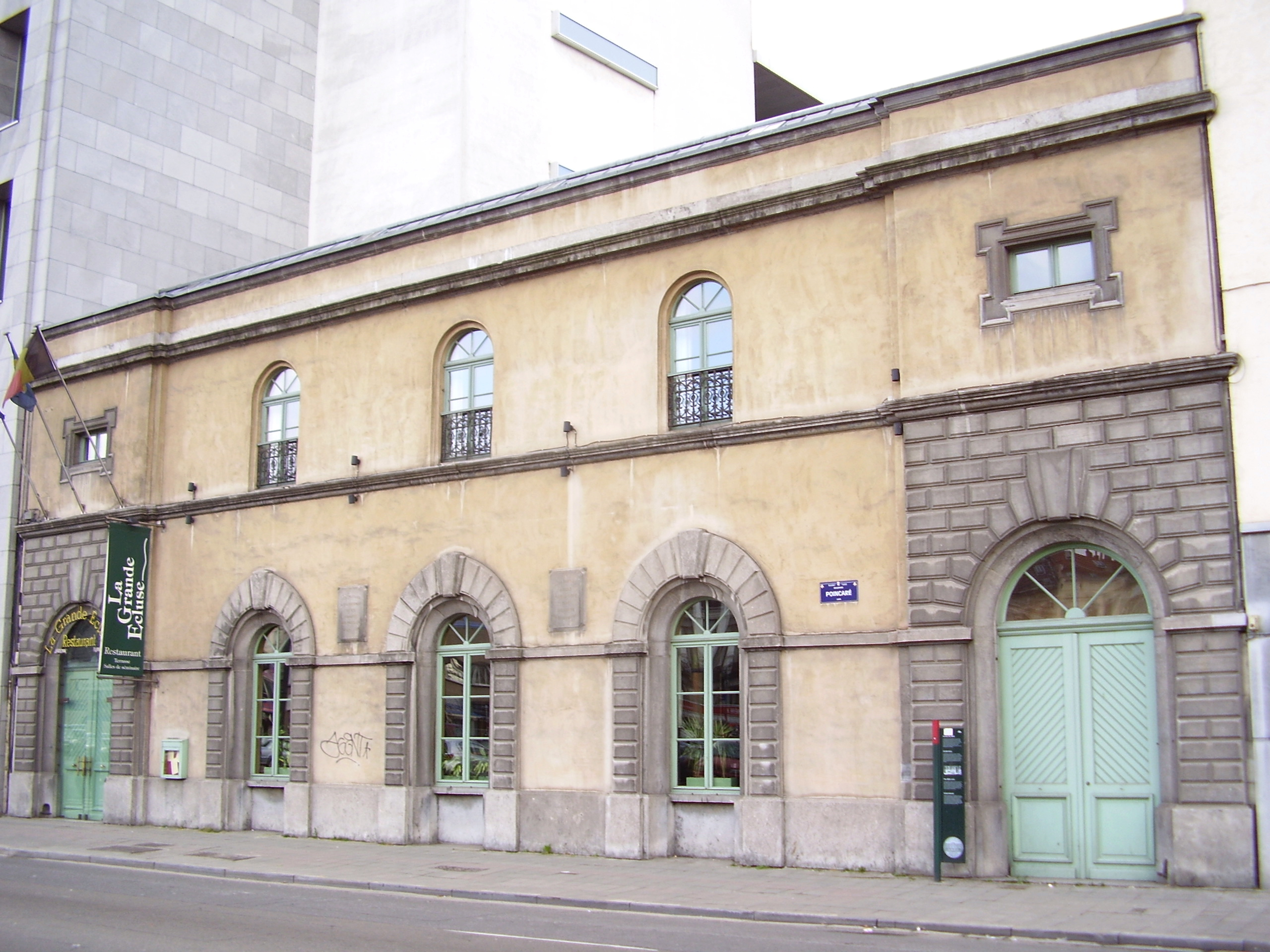
The building housing the Greater Sluice's mechanism, rebuilt by Léon Suys in 1868–1871

Although the original covering of the Senne resolved sanitary problems and flooding in Brussels' old city, this was not the case in peripheral areas. The Senne was still very polluted, despite work done to the sewers and spillways in the canal. The drainage into the canal was not able to completely stop the floods that regularly affected certain outer areas of the city.

In 1930, a group was created whose objective was to channel the Senne into tunnels for nearly its entire course through the Brussels metropolitan area. This was done in order to expand the benefits that the covering achieved in the old city. In the centre, the course of the river was to be changed (using a diversion) from the central boulevards to the peripheral boulevards of the Small Ring. The project, delayed by the Second World War and the work carried out on the North–South connection, was finished in 1955.

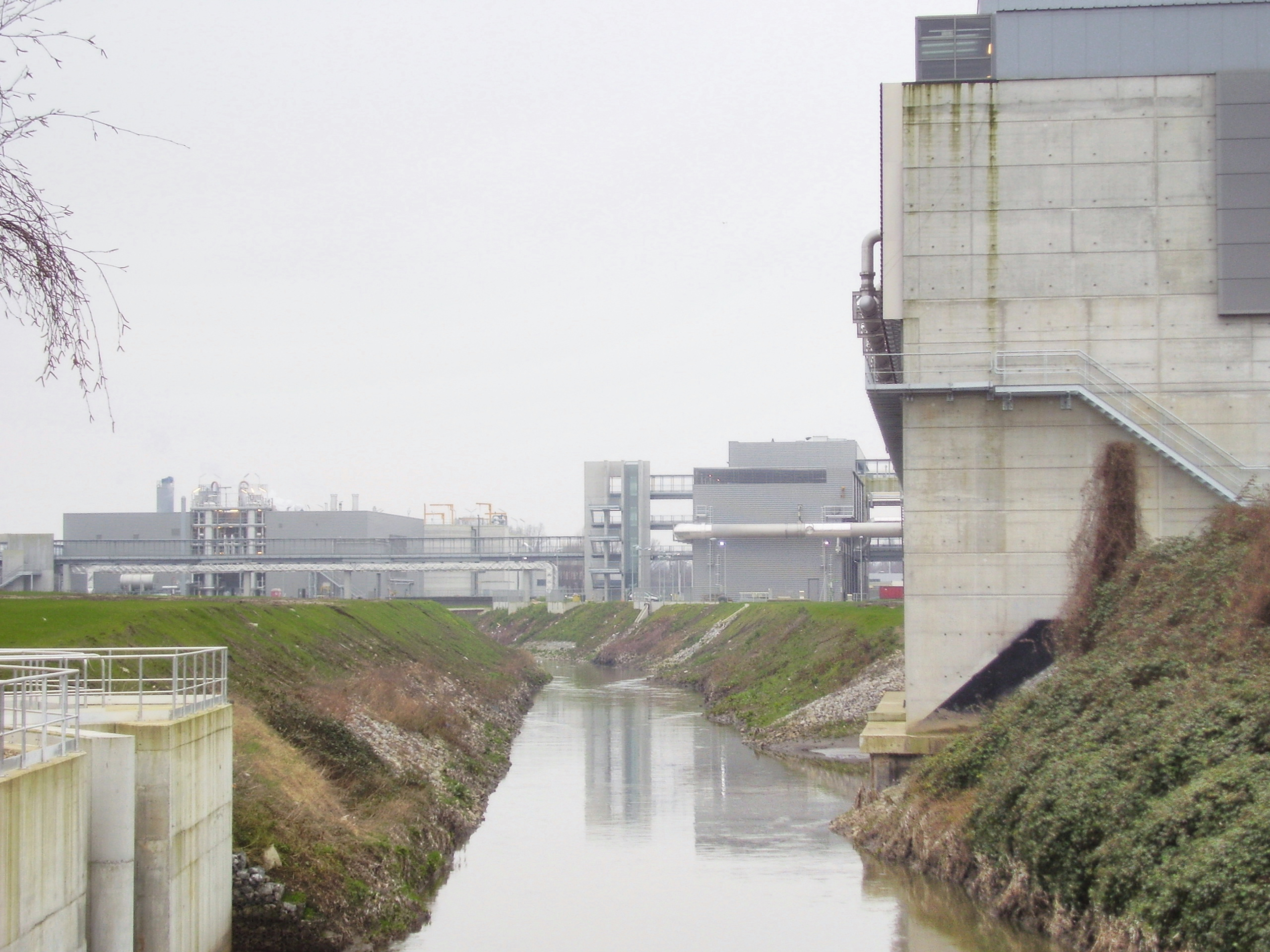
The Senne leaving the Brussels-North water treatment plant near the Buda Bridge in Haren

The central boulevards' disused channels later facilitated the construction of the North–South Axis of the premetro (underground tram), which opened in 1976. The conversion of the existing tunnels to metro tunnels ensured that there was minimal disruption on the surface. Some of the former pipes also served as storm drains. The Anspach Fountain was reinstalled in May 1981 in a basin that occupies the space between the Quai aux Briques/Baksteenkaai and the Quai au Bois à Brûler/Brandhoutkaai in the Quays or Sainte-Catherine/Sint-Katelijne Quarter.

Actual purification of the waste water from the Brussels-Capital Region was not completed until the 21st century, when two water treatment plants were built. The Brussels-South plant treats refuse water from 360,000 inhabitants, which is about one third of the polluted water, and lies on the border of Anderlecht and Forest. The Brussels-North plant, completed in March 2007, is located in Haren, between the Senne and the Charleroi-Willebroek Canal, near the Buda Bridge. A portion of the cost was footed by the Flemish government, as seven of the adjacent municipalities lie within the Flemish Region. This plant is capable of treating the water of 1.2 million inhabitants and should finally be capable of fully purifying the Senne, which had also long caused much of the Scheldt's pollution.

In 2021, a small part (200 m (660 ft)) of the river was uncovered again near the suburb of Buda. Plans are underway to uncover a larger 600 m (2,000 ft) section in Maximilien Park (north of the city centre) by 2025. These moves were made after the success of the water treatment in earlier decades, and a desire to include more green space in the city, as well as to build the river's ecological resilience, which had been essentially dead.

== See also ==
- Haussmann's renovation of Paris
- History of Brussels
- Belgium in the long nineteenth century
