= Paul de Vigne =

Belgian sculptor (1843–1901)

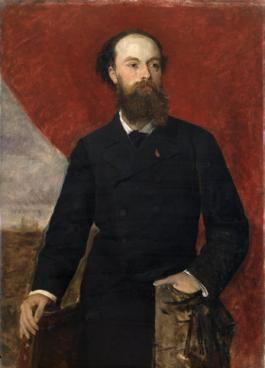
- Paul de Vigne
- Born: 26 April 1843; Ghent, Belgium
- Died: 1901 (aged 57–58)
- Occupation: sculptor

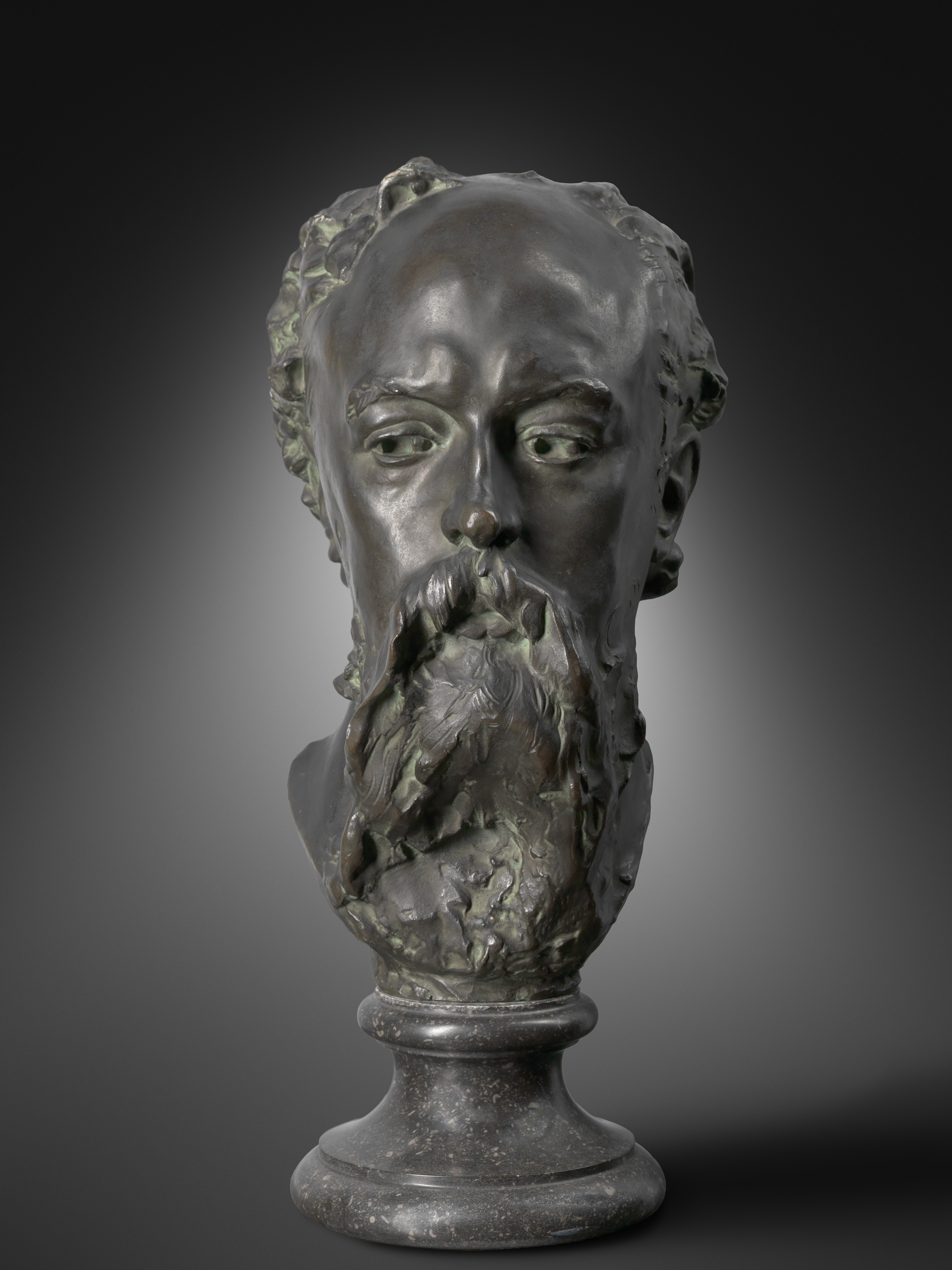
Portrait of Paul De Vigne by Auguste Rodin, 1880, Museum of Fine Arts, Ghent

Paul de Vigne (1843–1901), Belgian sculptor, was born on 26 April 1843 in Ghent. He created public monuments for display in Belgium and France.

He was trained by his father, a statuary, and began by exhibiting his Fra Angelico da Fiesole at the Ghent Salon in 1868. Among his contemporaries, Vigne, a classic sculptor, has the purest style, and the most anxious desire for harmonious perfection. His early works reflect the inspiration of Italian art, particularly that of Florence in the 14th and 15th centuries.

In 1872 he exhibited at the Brussels Salon a marble statue, Heliotrope (Ghent Gallery), and in 1875, in Brussels, Beatrix and Domenica. He was employed by the government to execute caryatides for the ornate facade of the Royal Conservatory of Brussels. In 1876 at the Antwerp Salon he had busts of Emmanuel Hiel and W. Wilson, which were afterwards placed in the municipal museum in Brussels. Until 1882 he lived in Paris, where he produced the marble statue Immortality (Brussels Gallery), and The Crowning of Art, a bronze group on the façade of the Palace of Fine Arts in Brussels. His monument to the popular heroes, Jan Breydel and Pieter de Coninck, was unveiled in Bruges in 1887.

At his death he left unfinished his principal work, the Anspach Fountain, which was erected in Brussels under the direction of the architect Charles-Émile Janlet with the co-operation of various sculptors. Among other notable works by De Vigne are Volumnia (1875); Poverella (1878); a bronze bust of Psyche (Brussels Gallery), of which there is an ivory replica; the marble statue of Marnix de Ste Aldegonde on the Sablon Square, Brussels; the Metdepenningen monument in the cemetery in Ghent; and the monument to Canon de Haerne in Kortrijk.

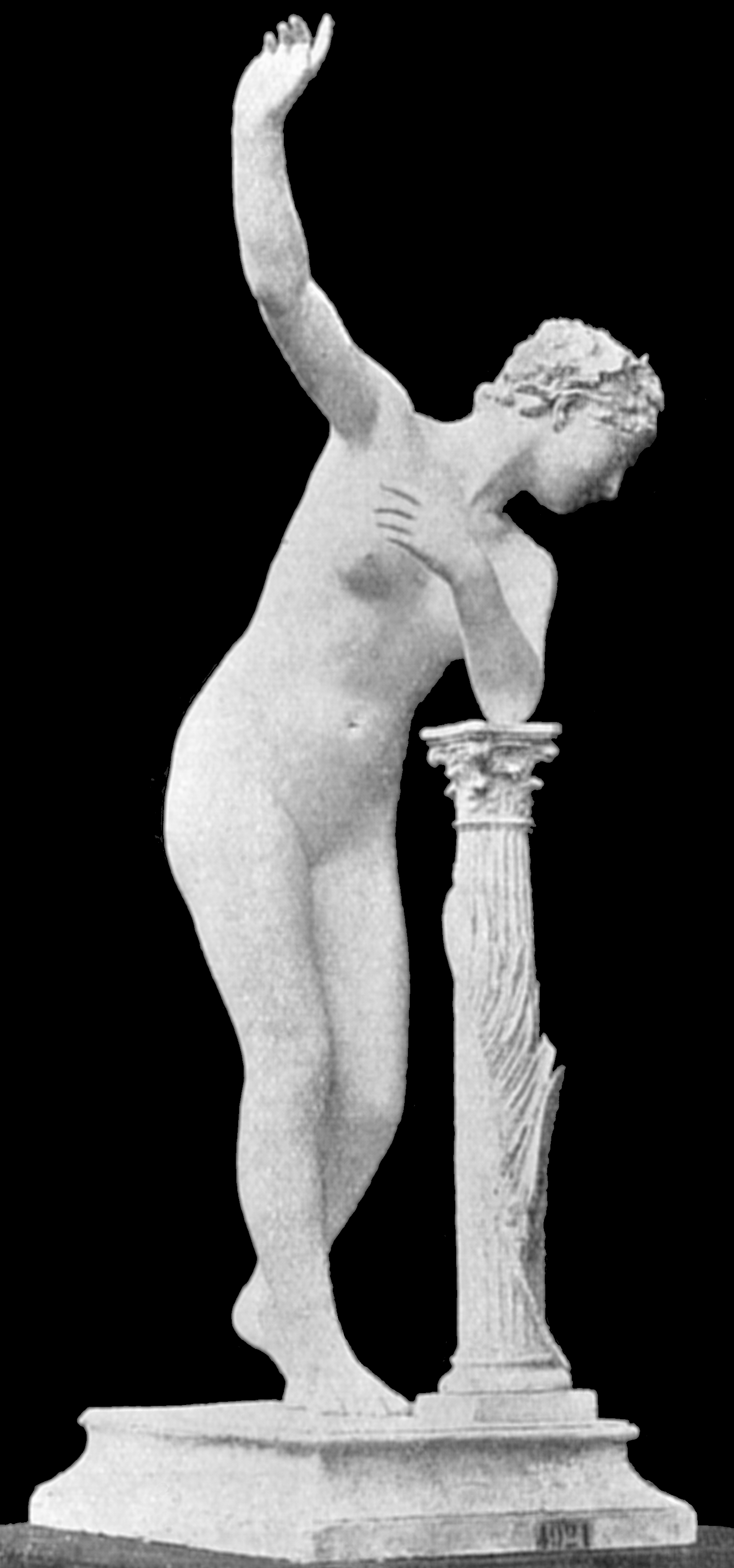
Tomb statue l'Immortalité

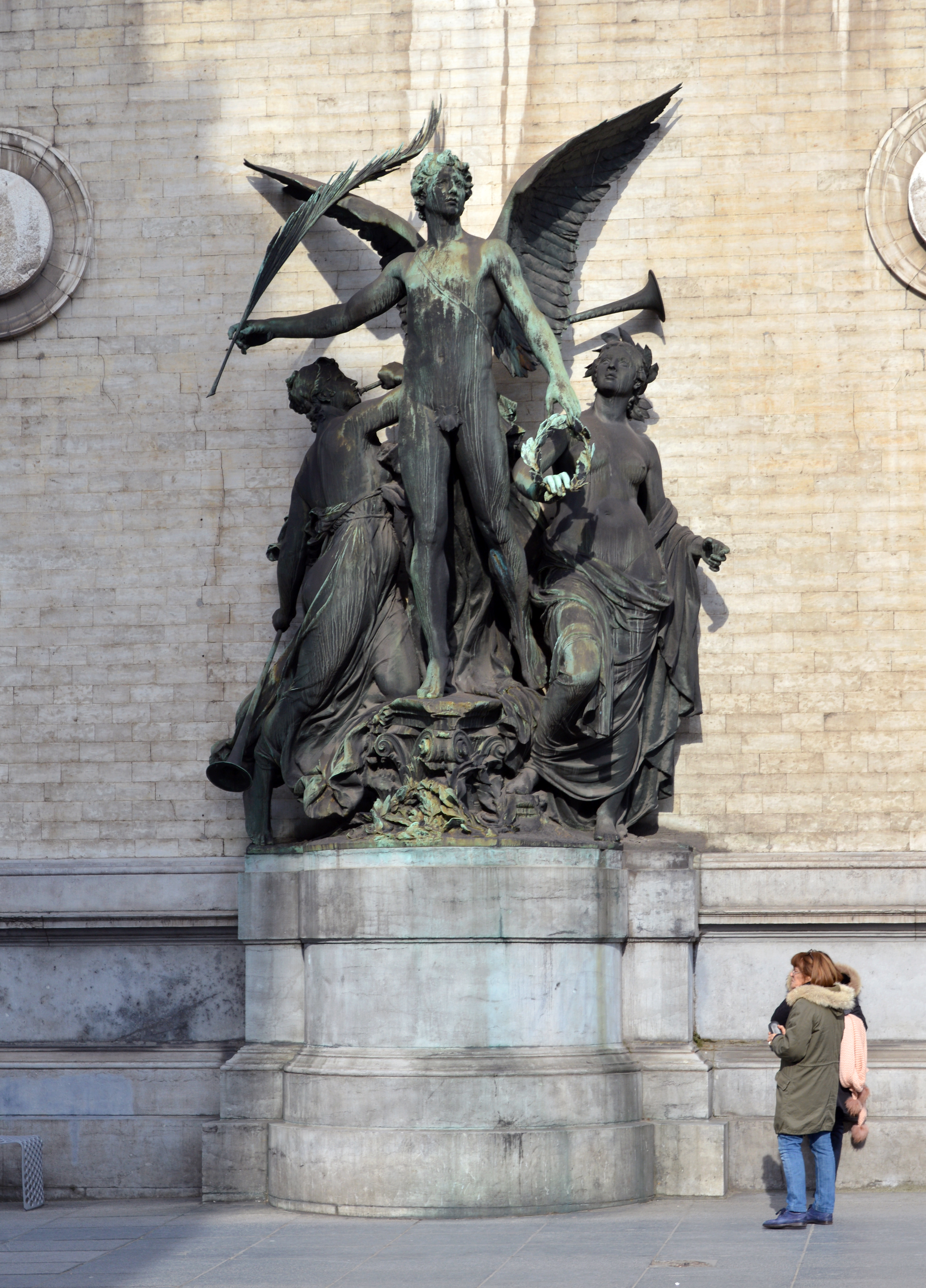
Triumph of Art (Brussels)

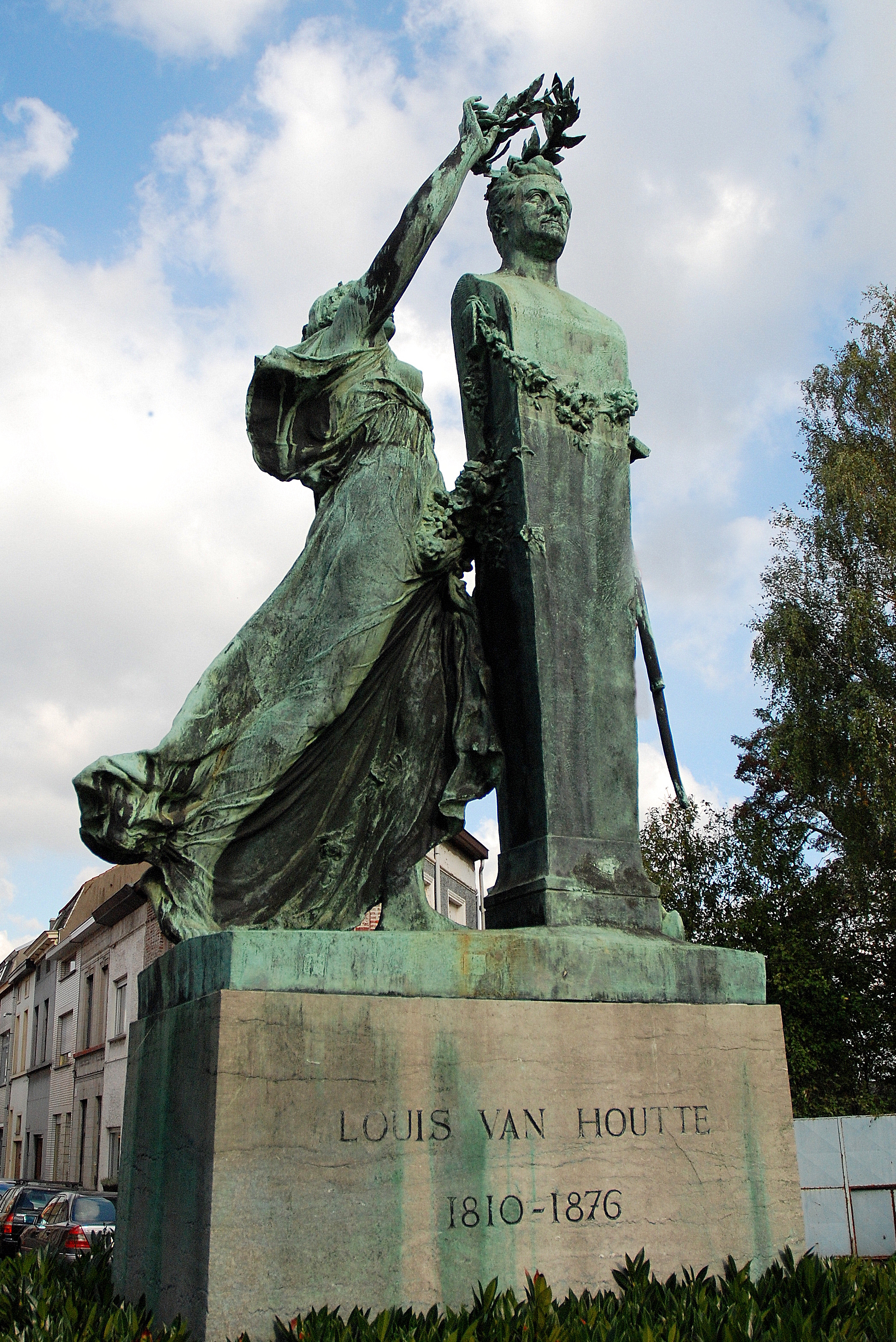
Sculpture in Gentbrugge

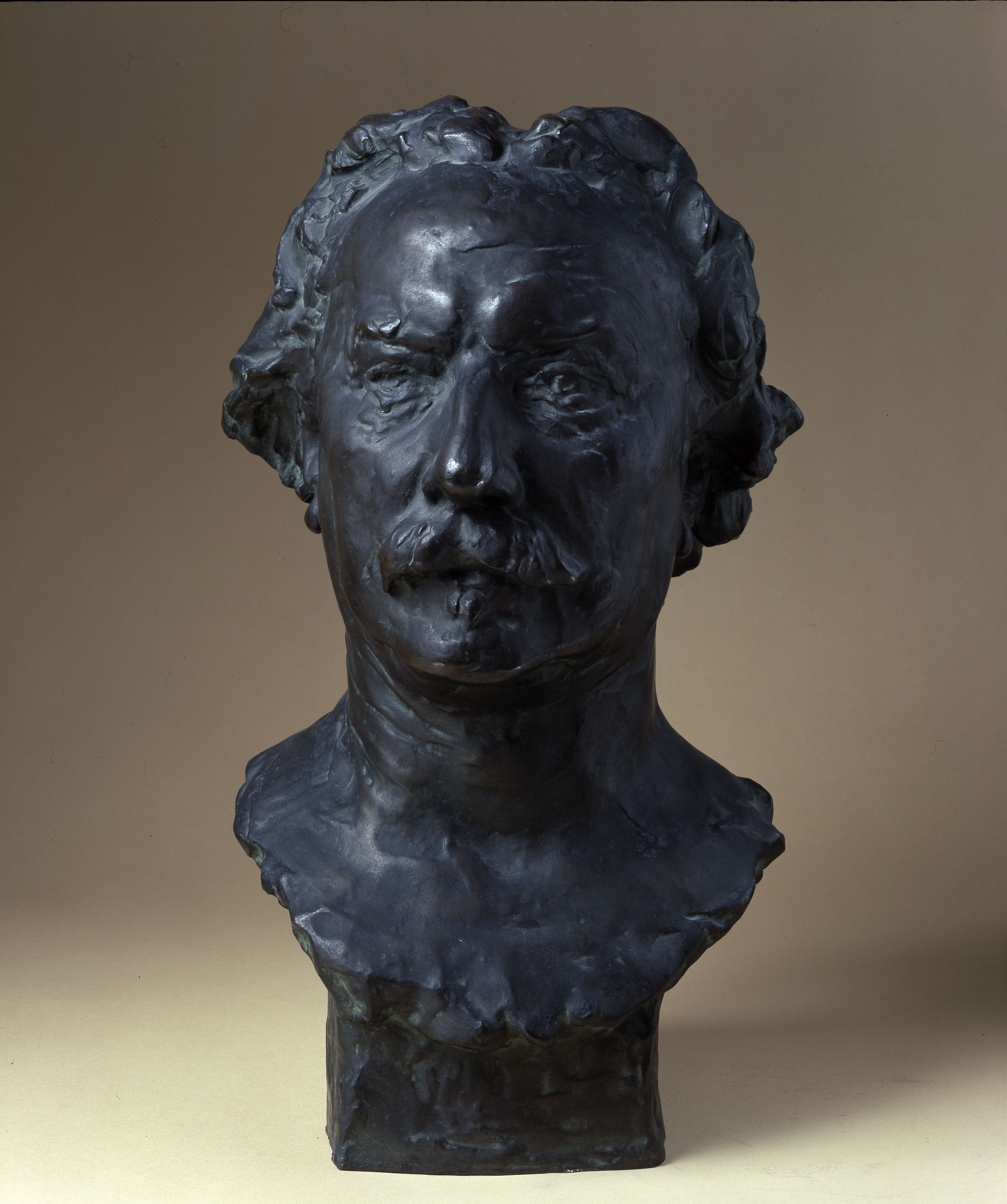
Lievin De Winne by Paul De Vigne
