= Godefroid Devreese =

Belgian sculptor

- Born: 19 August 1861; Kortrijk, Belgium
- Died: 31 August 1941 (aged 80); Brussels, Belgium
- Occupation: Sculptor

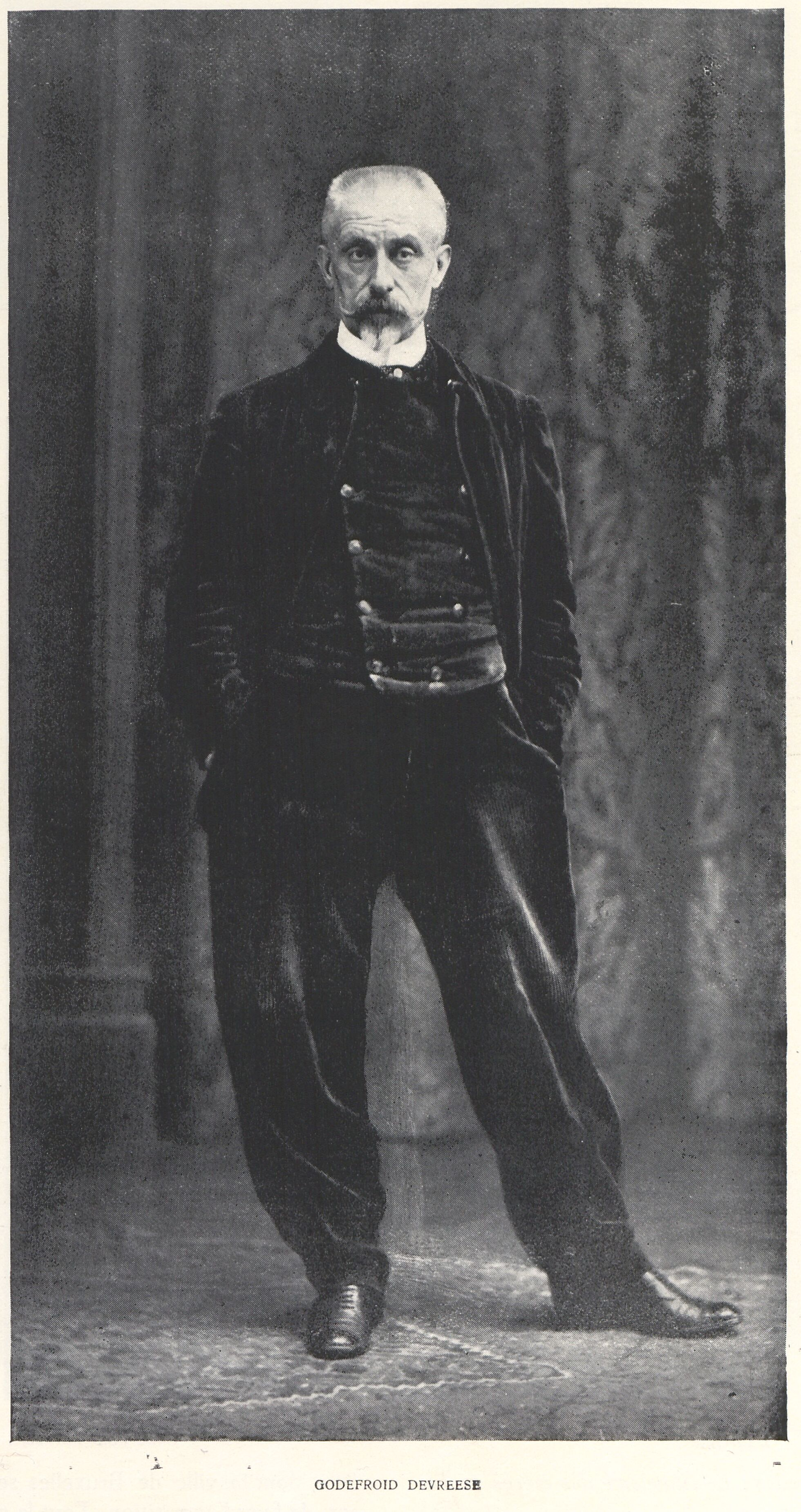
Photograph of Devreese, L'Art belge, 1920)

Godefroid Devreese (19 August 1861 – 31 August 1941) was a Belgian sculptor. His work was part of the sculpture event in the art competition at the 1936 Summer Olympics.

== Honors and Awards ==
- Grand Officer of the Order of the Crown (Belgium)
- Commander of the Order of Leopold (Belgium)
- Commander of the Order of the Crown of Romania
- Commander of the Order of the Crown of Italy
- Commander of the Order of Isabella the Catholic
- Officer of the Order of the Legion of Honour
