= Jules Anspach =

Belgian liberal politician and mayor of Brussels (1829–1879)

Baron Jules Anspach
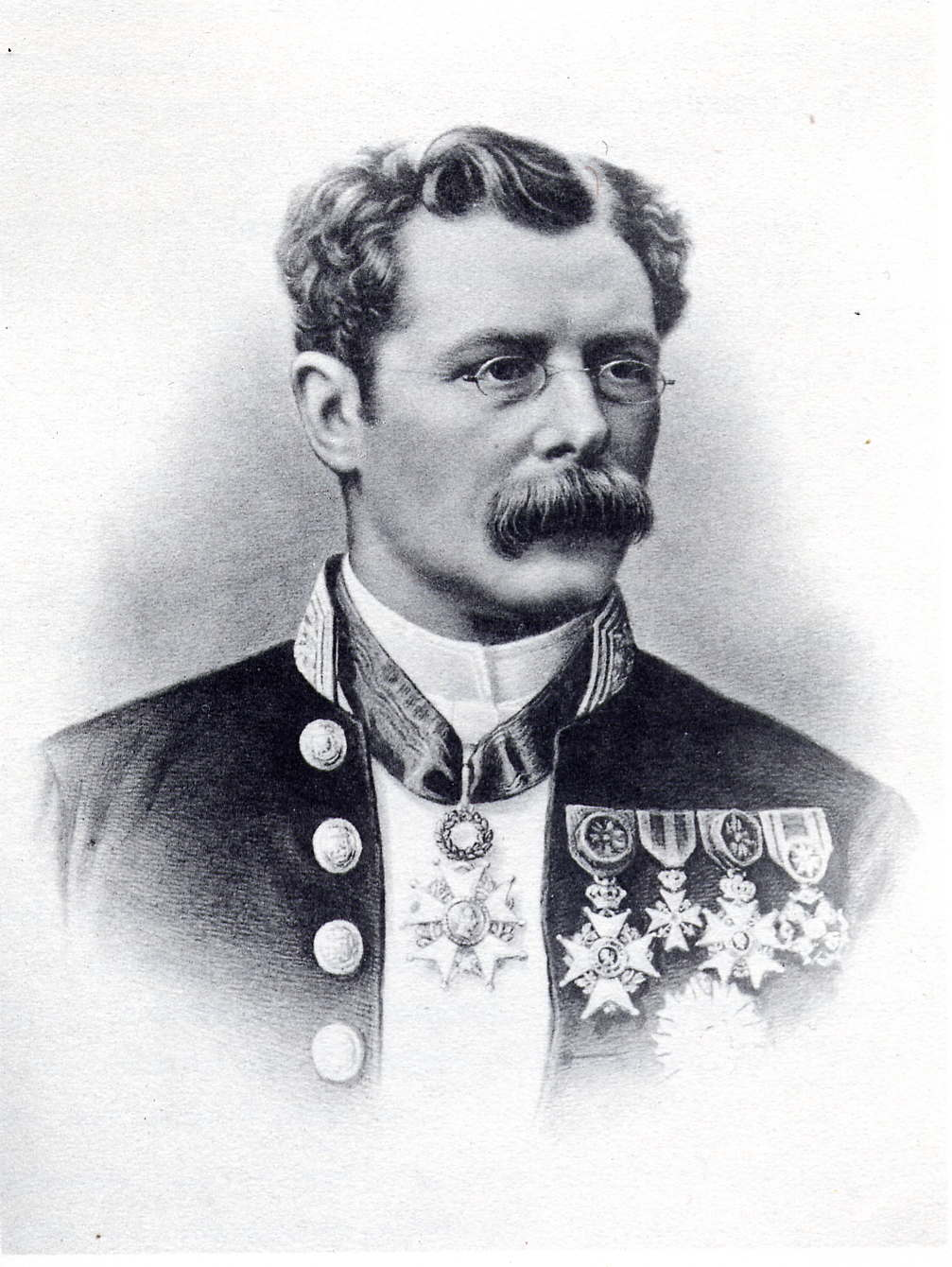

Mayor of Brussels
- In office 15 October 1863 – 19 May 1879
- Preceded by: André-Napoléon Fontainas
- Succeeded by: Felix Vanderstraeten

Personal details
- Born: Jules Victor Anspach; 20 July 1829 Brussels, United Kingdom of the Netherlands
- Died: 19 May 1879 (aged 49) Etterbeek, Belgium
- Party: Liberal Party
- Occupation: Politician

Baron Jules Victor Anspach (20 July 1829 – 19 May 1879) was a Belgian liberal politician and mayor of the City of Brussels. He is best known for his renovations surrounding the covering of the river Senne (1867–1871).

== Life ==
Anspach was born in Brussels into a family of Calvinist Genevan origin. His father François (died 1858) served in the Belgian Chamber of Representatives. Jules Anspach studied law at the Free University of Brussels, becoming a Doctor of Law. As with many Liberals, Anspach was a Freemason. Like his father, Anspach was elected to the Chamber of Representatives.

Anspach rose rapidly, replacing Fontainas as mayor of Brussels in 1863, aged only 34, holding the office until his death in 1879. He effected massive changes to the urban landscape of Brussels, centred on his oeuvre, the covering of the Senne (1867–1871). His renovations in Brussels paralleled those by Baron Haussmann in Paris. The modern city remains largely Anspach's creation in its basic form. He is buried in Brussels Cemetery.

== Legacy ==
The Boulevard Anspach/Anspachlaan, one of the central boulevards created by his massive renovations of the city, and the main artery in downtown Brussels today, bears his name.

== See also ==
- List of mayors of the City of Brussels
- Belgian nobility
