= Buda Bridge =

Bridge in Brussels, Belgium

Buda Bridge: Pont de Buda (French); Budabrug (Dutch)
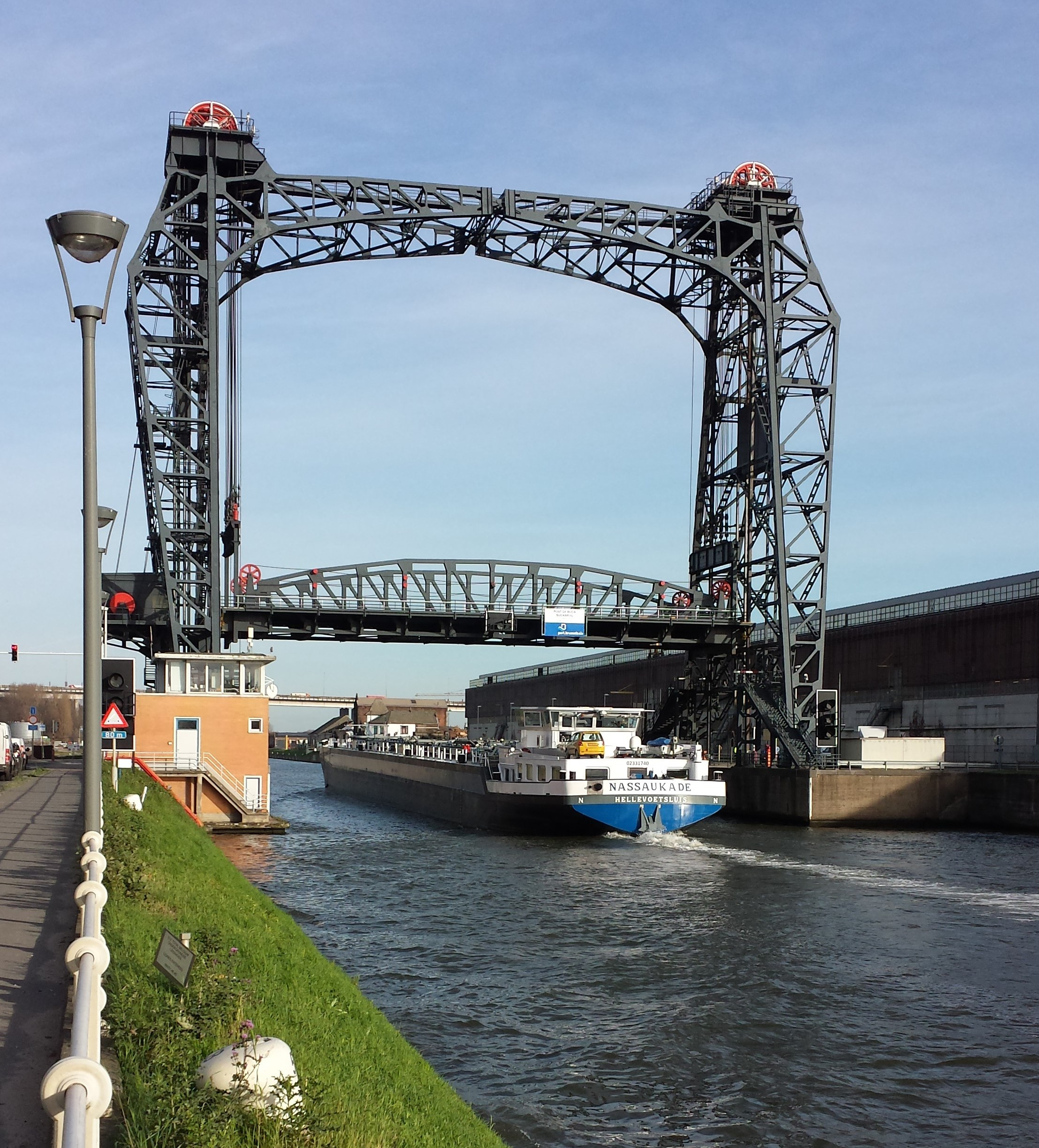
- General view of the bridge with the roadway raised
- Coordinates: 50°54′17″N 4°24′28″E
- Carries: Road traffic
- Crosses: Brussels–Scheldt Maritime Canal (Willebroek Canal)
- Locale: Neder-Over-Heembeek, Brussels-Capital Region, Belgium

Characteristics
- Material: Metal
- Height: 43 m (141 ft)
- No. of spans: 1

History
- Opened: 1955

Location
- Interactive map of Buda Bridge

The Buda Bridge (French: Pont de Buda; Dutch: Budabrug) is a vertical-lift movable bridge that crosses the Brussels–Scheldt Maritime Canal (Willebroek Canal) in Brussels, Belgium. It was inaugurated in 1955 and replaced a 1934 bridge destroyed during World War II. The structure stands 43 metres (141 ft) tall and allows the roadway to be raised to a height of 33 metres (108 ft) in order to facilitate the passage of vessels navigating the canal.

The bridge takes its name from an old farm in the area, itself named in honour of the victory the Austrian army achieved over the Ottoman army at Buda, the present-day western part of Budapest, Hungary.

== Gallery ==
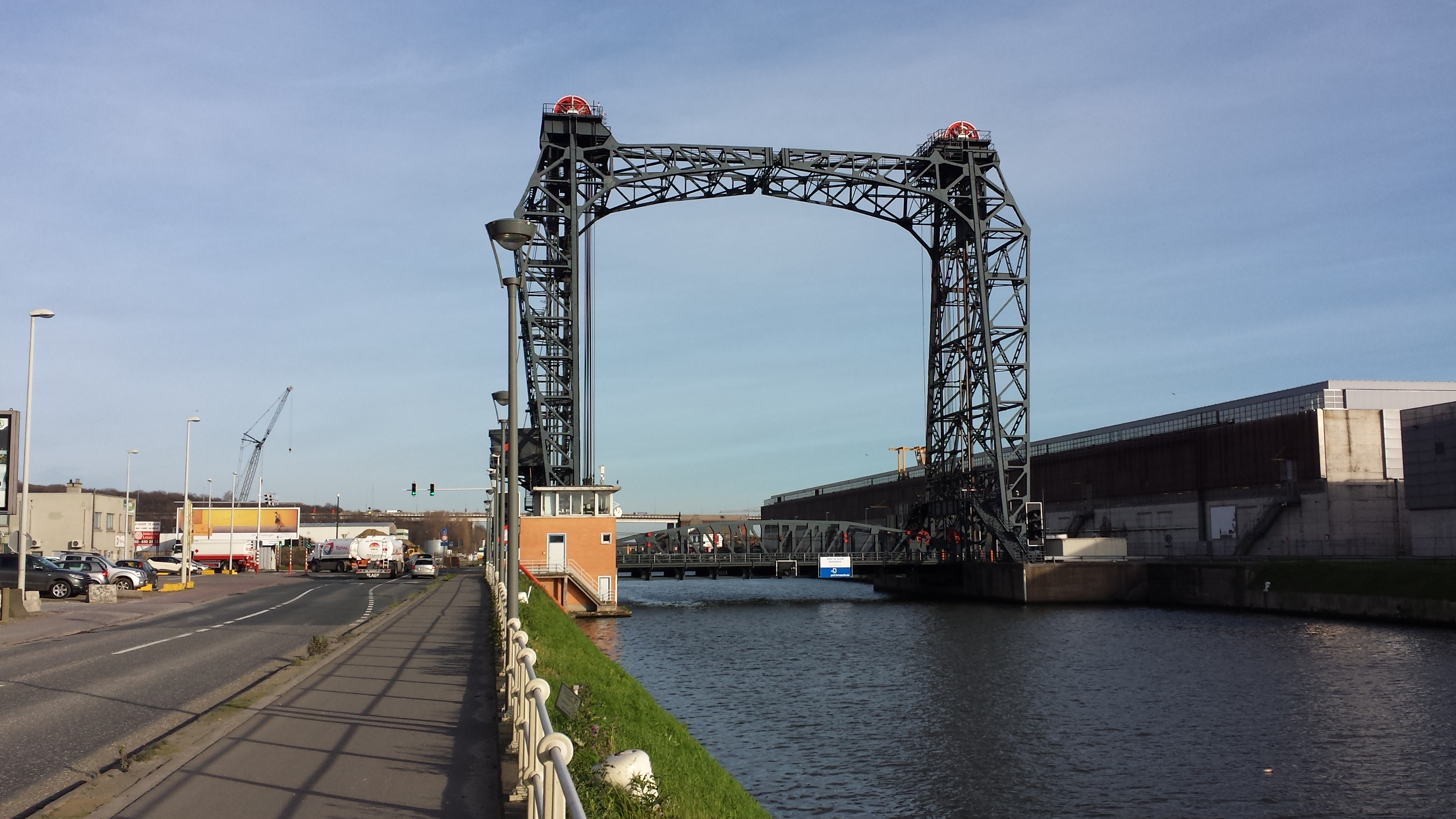
General view of the bridge with the roadway lowered

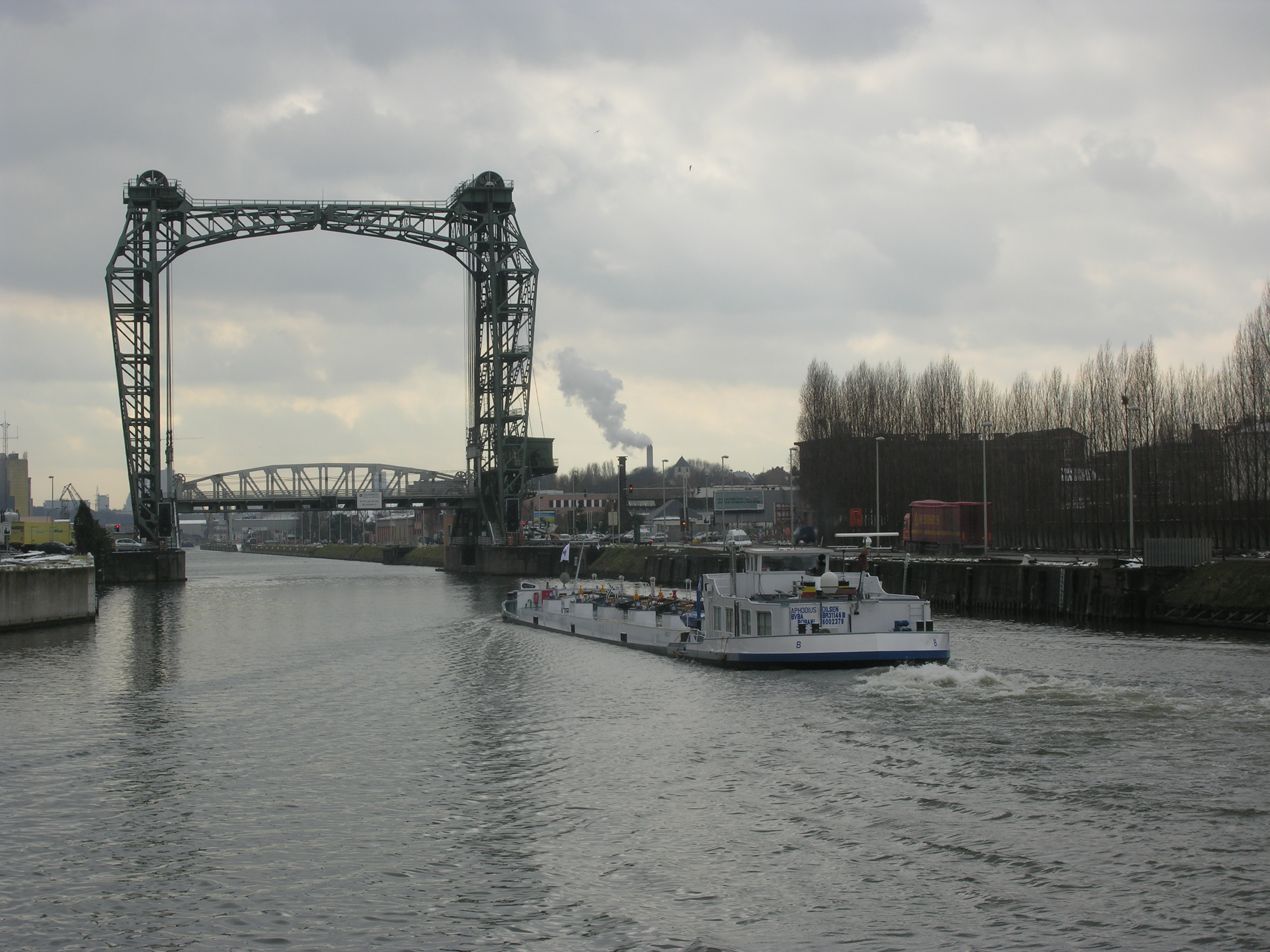
General view of the bridge with the roadway raised

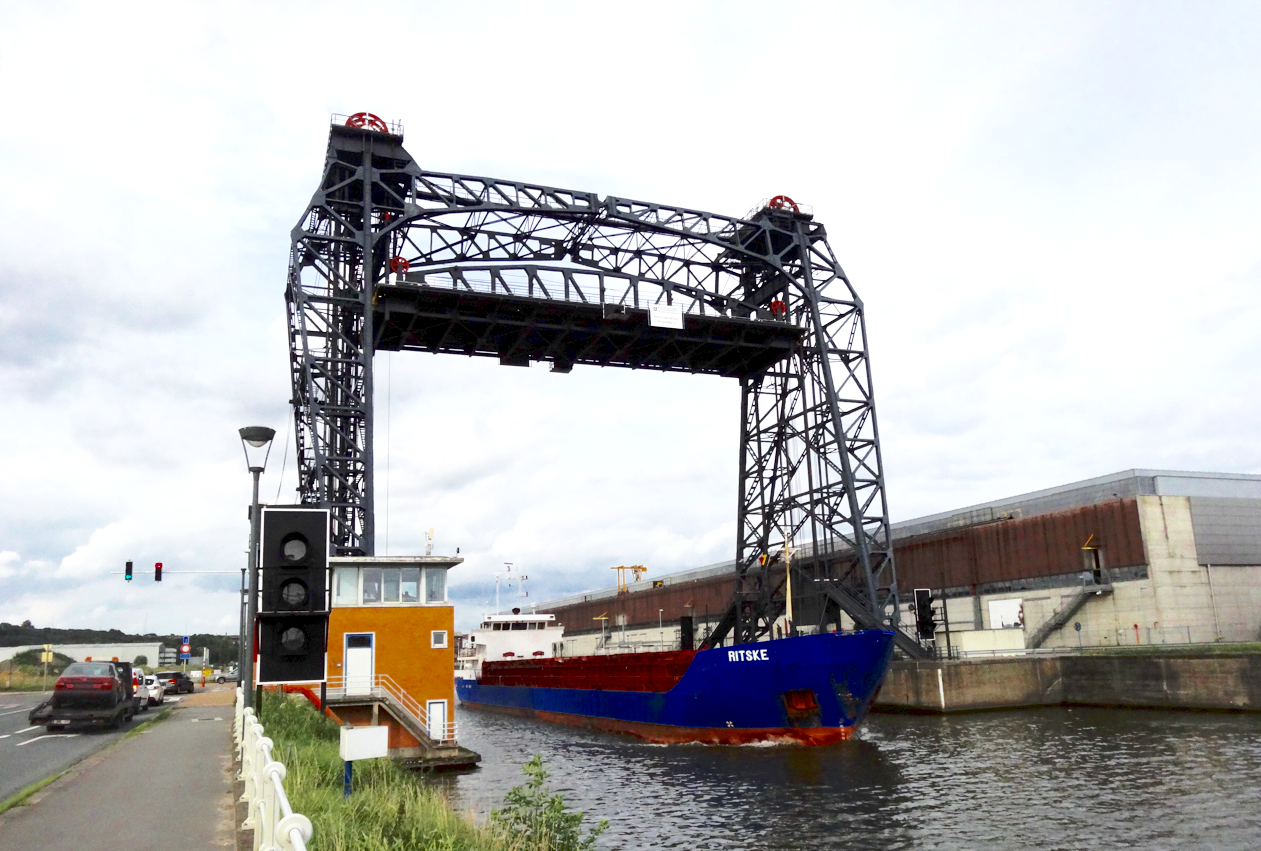
View of the bridge with the roadway raised
