= Hotel Le Plaza, Brussels =

Hotel in Brussels, Belgium

Hotel Le Plaza
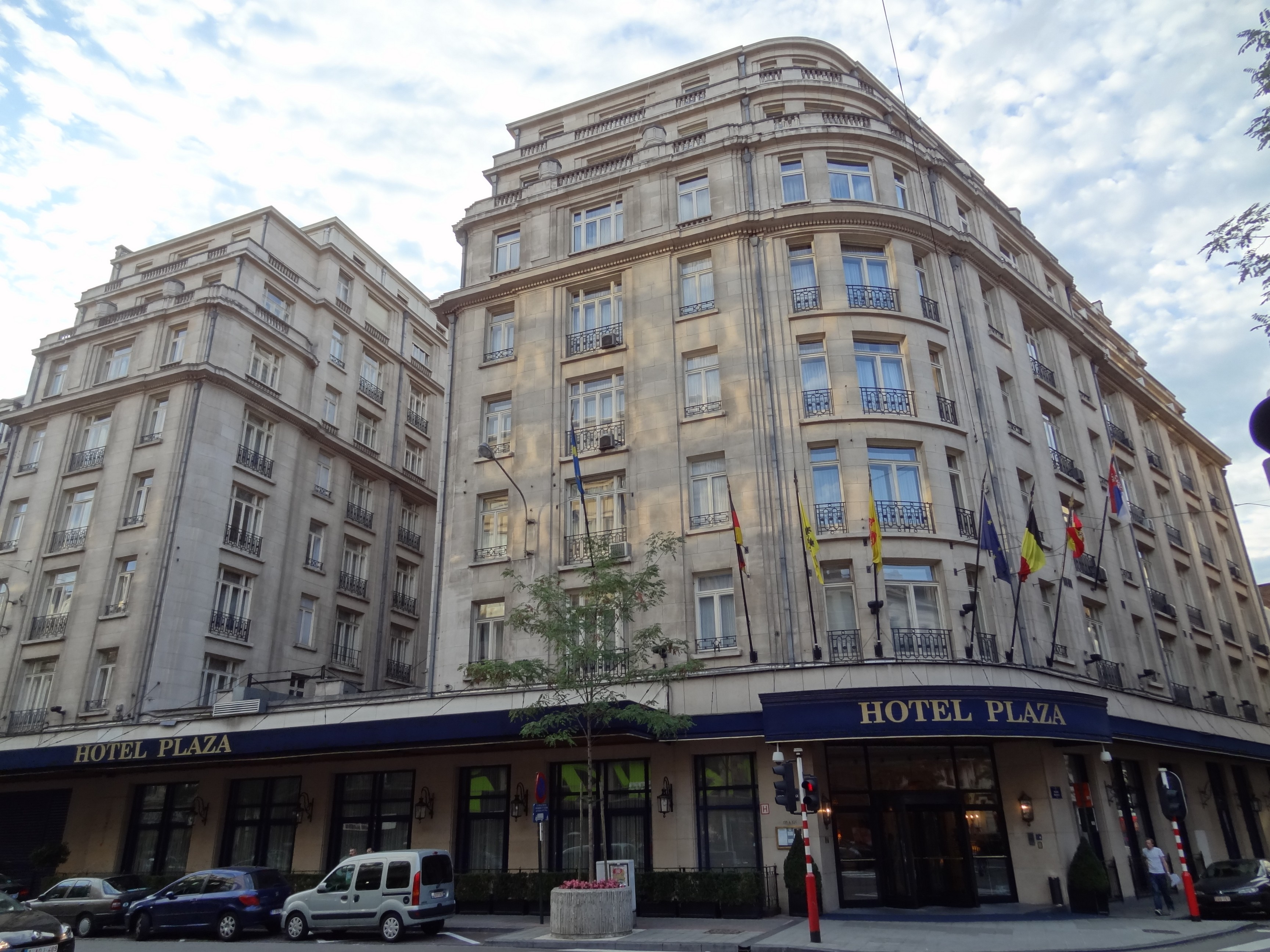
- The Hotel Le Plaza seen from the Boulevard Adolphe Max/Adolphe Maxlaan

General information
- Type: Hotel
- Architectural style: Art Deco; Louis XVI
- Location: Boulevard Adolphe Max / Adolphe Maxlaan 118–126, 1000 City of Brussels, Brussels-Capital Region, Belgium
- Coordinates: 50°51′16″N 4°21′23″E
- Opening: 1930 (96 years ago); 1996 (30 years ago)
- Closed: 1976 (original)
- Owner: Baron van Gysel de Meise

Technical details
- Floor count: 7

Design and construction
- Architect: Michel Polak
- Designations: Protected (23/07/1992)

Other information
- Number of rooms: 190
- Number of suites: 14
- Number of restaurants: 1 (L'Estérel)
- Parking: 1
- Public transit: 1 4 5 10 De Brouckère and 2 4 6 10 Rogier

Website
- www.leplaza-brussels.be/en

The Hotel Le Plaza is a five-star luxury hotel in the Marais–Jacqmain Quarter of Brussels, Belgium. Built in an Art Deco style with Louis XVI interiors and opened to customers in 1930, it is one of the last independent hotels in Brussels, and also one of the oldest. It has 190 rooms and 14 spacious suites. It has served as a meeting place for statesmen, artists and entertainers.

The hotel is located at 118–126, boulevard Adolphe Max/Adolphe Maxlaan, not far from the Place de Brouckère/De Brouckèreplein and the Place Charles Rogier/Karel Rogierplein, as well as Brussels' busiest shopping street, the Rue Neuve/Nieuwstraat.

== History ==
=== Origins and early history ===
Under the reign of King Leopold II, following the covering of the river Senne (1867–1871), Brussels was remodelled with large boulevards and green avenues. The then-mayor of the City of Brussels, Jules Anspach, contributed to the transformation of the urban landscape of the capital through the realisation of thoroughfares from the North Station to the South Station, including routes from south to north and from west to east: the Boulevard Maurice Lemonnier/Maurice Lemonnierlaan, the Boulevard Anspach/Anspachlaan, the Boulevard Adolphe Max/Adolphe Maxlaan, and the Boulevard Émile Jacqmain/Émile Jacqmainlaan.

The Hotel Le Plaza opened its doors in 1930 on the Boulevard Adolphe Max. Soon after, guests came to stay there, and it became one of the symbols of Brussels' luxury hotel sector. In 1940, during the German occupation, the hotel was placed under the authority of German troops, and the military commander for Belgium and northern France took up quarters there. Premeditating its destruction, the Hotel Le Plaza was, like the Palace of Justice, made into a booby trap by the Germans before the arrival of the Allied forces. When it exploded, it killed two British Army officers—Captain George Hayton (age 32) and Major Anthony Wright (age 30)—and destroyed the hotel's Winter Garden and stained glass dome. The rest of the hotel was not damaged.

During the Belgo-Congolese Round Table Conference, the Hotel Le Plaza served as the headquarters for the Congolese delegates. It was there that they celebrated on 27 January 1960, after receiving assurances of Congolese independence from Belgium on 30 June of that year. On this occasion, the singer Le Grand Kallé and the African Jazz sang and played for the first time their song Indépendance Cha Cha, which immediately became the anthem of the anti-colonial movements throughout Black Africa.

Historical pictures

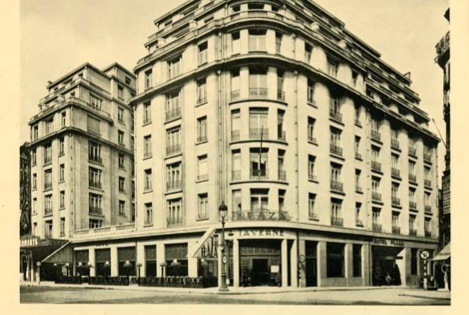
The main front

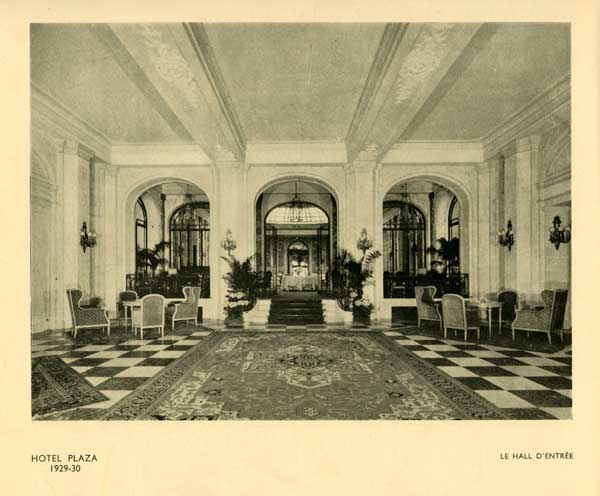
The lobby

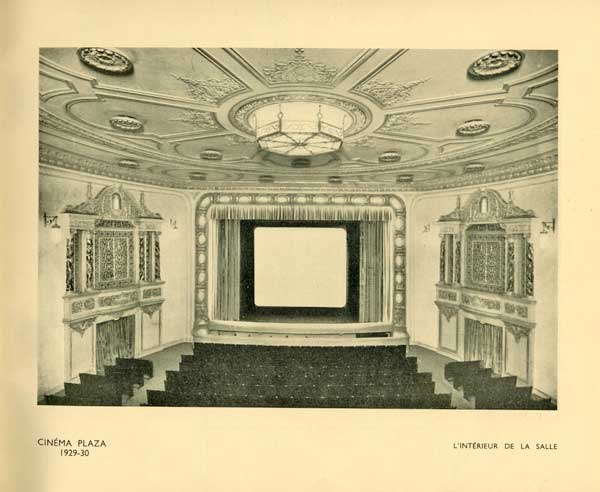
The theatre

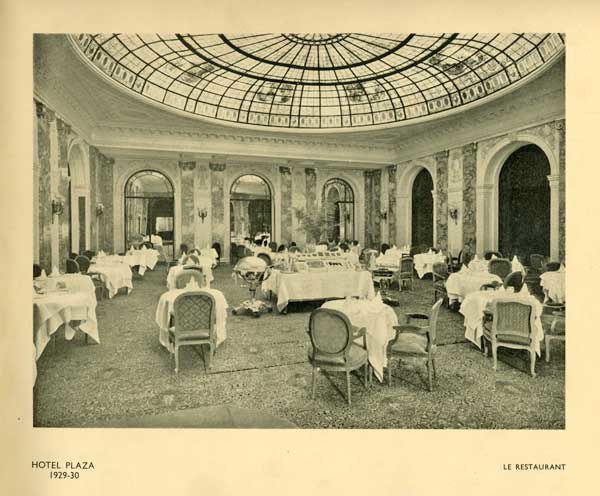
The Winter Garden

=== Closure, renovation and reopening ===
The Hotel Le Plaza was obliged, like many of its contemporaries, to close in 1976. Twenty years passed before the rebirth of the Hotel le Plaza under the impulse of its owner, Baron van Gysel de Meise. With a view to restore the building's original purpose, while modernising its amenities, the Société de Gestion Hôtelière undertook, from February 1995, considerable renovation and furnishing works for an investment of 400 million Belgian francs. The restoration works were placed under the direction of the decorator Pierre-Yves Rochon—who was in particular in charge of the decoration of the Hôtel George V in Paris—and of Anne van Gysel.

On 23 July 1992, the hotel was listed as a protected monument by the Monuments and Sites Directorate of the Brussels-Capital Region.

== Building ==
The architect of the Hotel Le Plaza, Michel Polak, found inspiration in the style of the Hôtel George V in Paris, ensuring by its concrete frame a remarkable solidity. The frontage was covered with French stones. The interior was designed to reflect the ideas of brightness and splendour: high ceilings, large corridors, large light rooms, several naturally lit bathrooms, and majestic stairways covering eight floors, decorated with stained glass windows and fringed with wrought iron handrails.

=== Rooms ===
The Hotel Le Plaza offers 190 rooms and suites on seven floors: 109 classic rooms, 53 Deluxe rooms, 20 Prestige rooms, 4 Executive suites, 1 Plaza suite and 1 Presidential suite, which is one of the biggest in the Benelux. The rooms are amongst the largest of the city, with a minimal size of 35 m^{2} (380 sq ft). The suites, with high ceilings, are situated along large and spacious corridors.

=== Theatre ===
The theatre is a former cinema with a surface of 460 m^{2} (5,000 sq ft), designated as a historical monument through a royal decree. It was built in 1930, in a unique Spanish–Arab–Moorish style. Under the name of Acropole Cinema, it opened in 1928 and had an interior designed in a Spanish style, with many false windows and barley sugar columns. Seating was provided in stalls and balcony. At one time (possibly in the 1930s), it ran cine-variety shows.

The entrance to the cinema was located at the left-hand side of the twin-blocked building and originally had a large vertical PLAZA sign over the entrance. There was a Plaza Taverne located on the corner of the Boulevard Adolphe Max and the narrow Rue de Malines/Mechelsestraat, now the main entrance to the hotel. The rear of the building backs onto the former Variétiés theatre (Cinerama) around the corner on the Rue de Malines.

During the renovation, the decision was taken to keep the original boxes, the genuine bracket-lamps, the stage, as well as the richly sculpted wall ornaments of Andalusian inspiration. It is now used as a banquet hall and conference facility.

=== L'Estérel restaurant ===
The restaurant features the particularity of combining a bar and a restaurant for 48 guests. The decoration of the restaurant is luxurious like the hotel. The particularity of this decoration is the painted ceiling, picturing a mainly blue sky. The menu, created by the chef Olivier Bontemps and his sous-chef Alexandre Van Kalck, varies with the seasons to guarantee fresh quality ingredients.

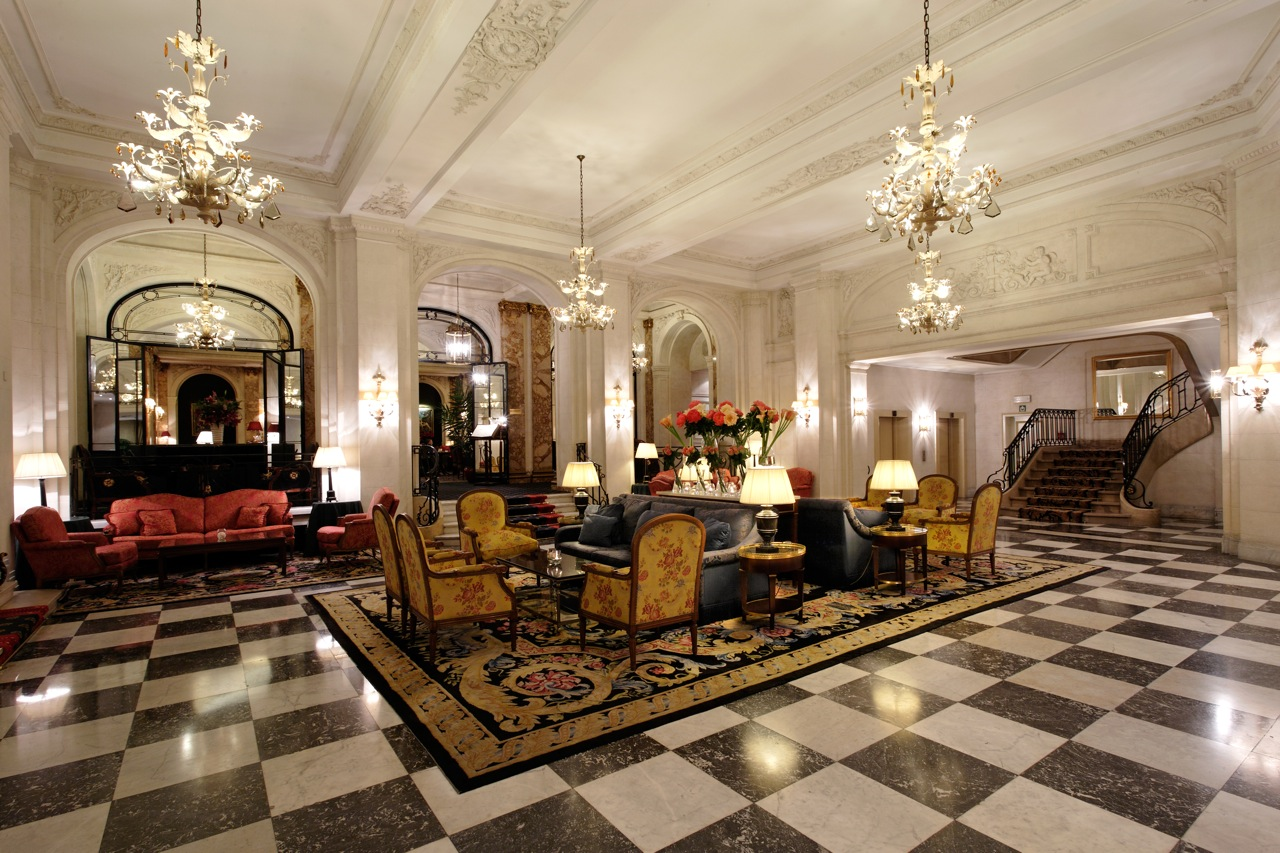
The reception

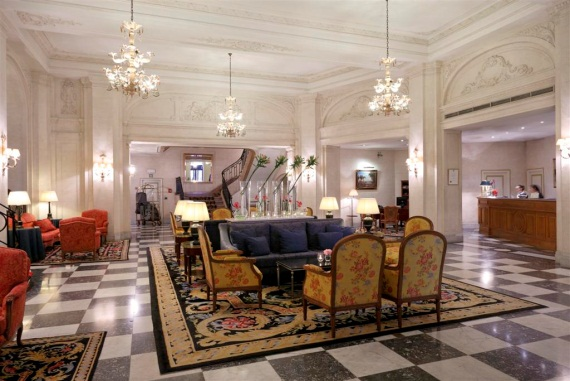
The lobby

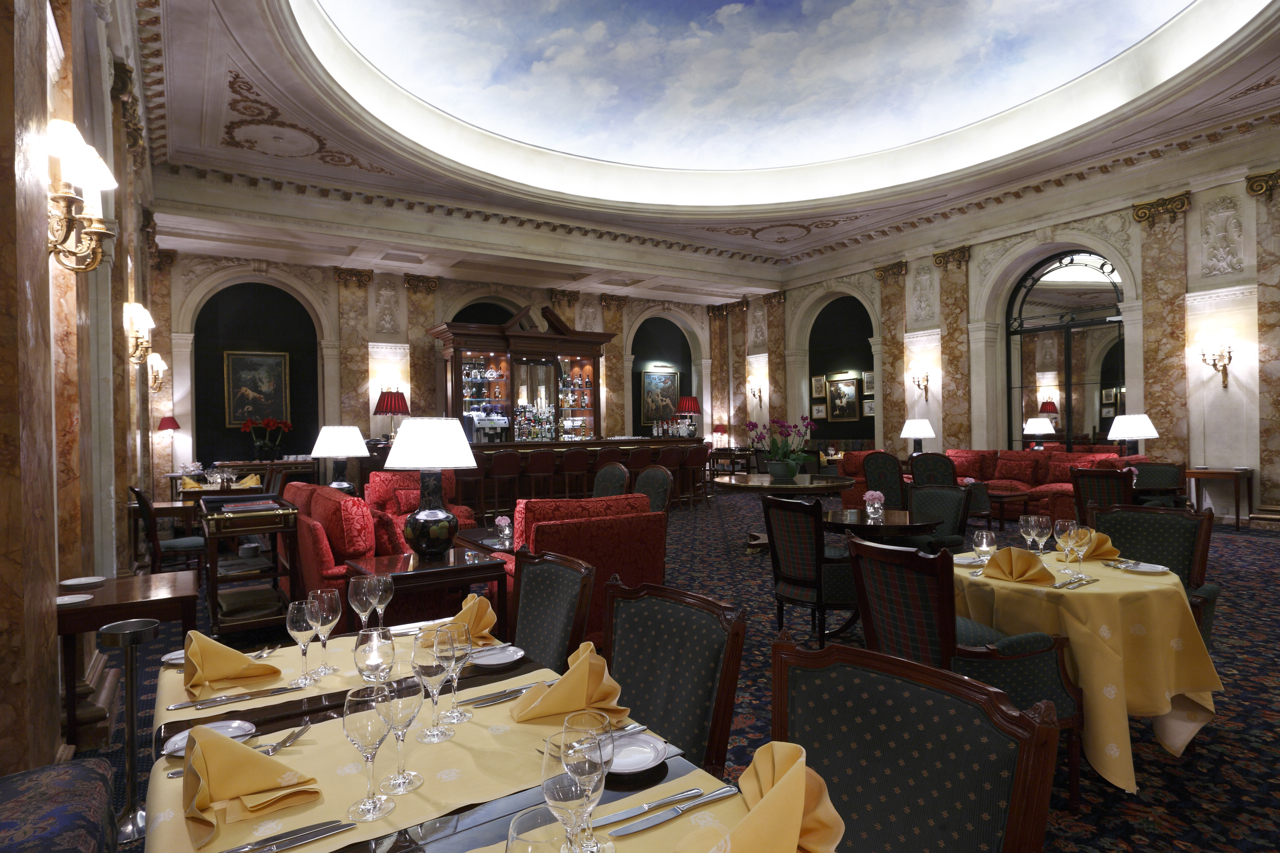
The restaurant

== Famous guests ==
Shortly after the liberation of Brussels on 4 September 1944, the British General Staff occupied the Hotel Le Plaza. In addition, Sir Winston Churchill and Joseph Luns, Secretary-General of NATO from 1971 to 1984, stayed there regularly. Other important personalities of politics and finance were regular guests of the hotel, but it was most appreciated by the world of the arts and show business: Charles Aznavour, Jean Marais, Maurice Chevalier, Mistinguett, Louis Jouvet, Michèle Morgan, Gérard Philippe, Annie Cordy, Simone Signoret and Yves Montand, Luis Mariano, Gary Cooper, Raymond Devos, Georges Guétary, Josephine Baker, Fernandel, Lucienne Boyer, Charles Trenet, Martine Carol, Bourvil, Brigitte Bardot, Jean-Claude Pascal, and Claudine Dupuis.

== See also ==
- Lists of hotels
- Corinthia Grand Hotel Astoria
- Hotel Métropole, Brussels
- Art Deco in Brussels
- History of Brussels
- Belgium in the long nineteenth century
