= Hotel Métropole, Brussels =

Hotel in Brussels, Belgium

Hotel Métropole
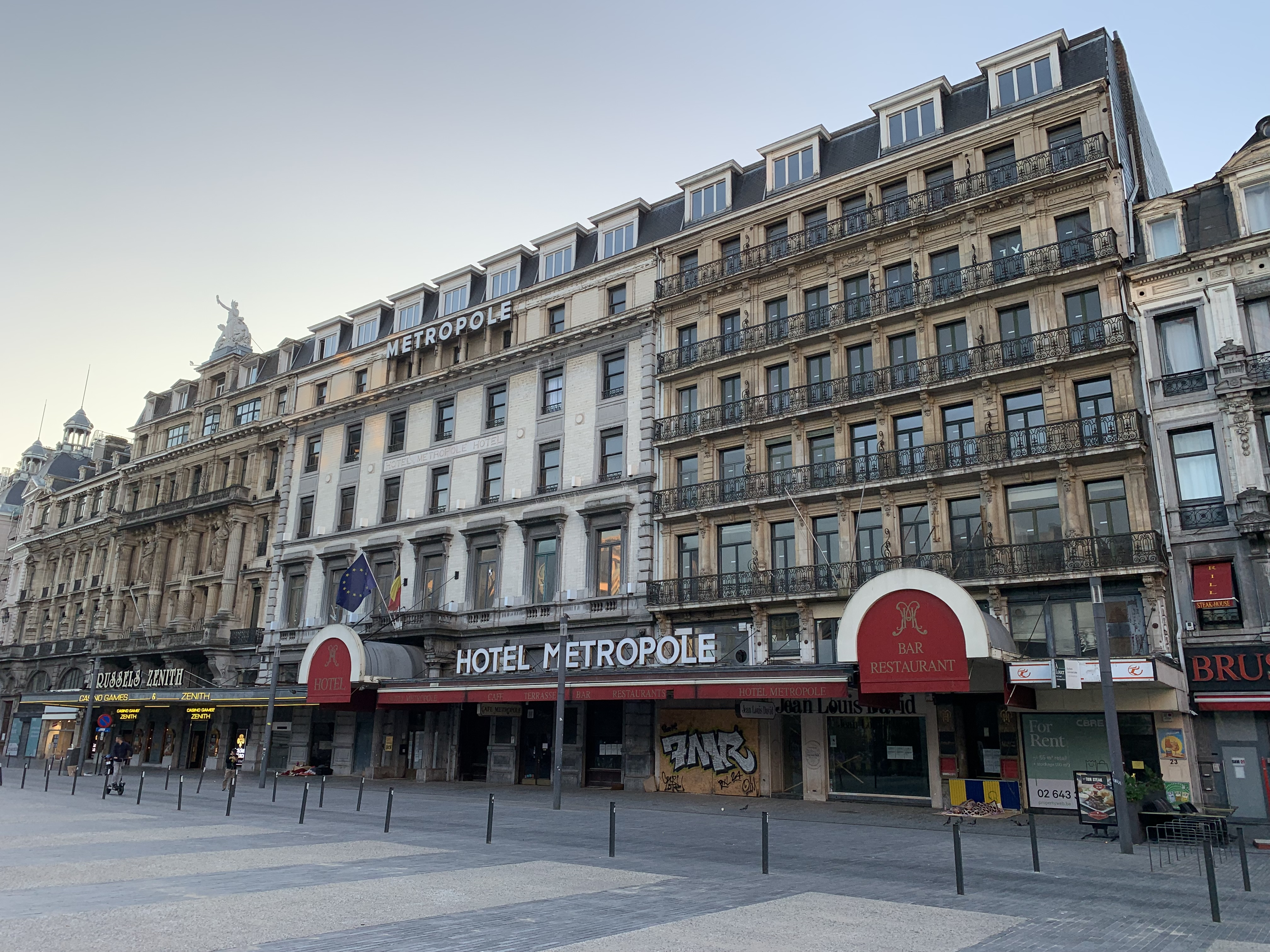
- The Hotel Métropole seen from the Place de Brouckère/De Brouckèreplein

General information
- Type: Hotel
- Architectural style: Eclectic; Neo-Renaissance; Neo-Rococo
- Location: Place de Brouckère / De Brouckèreplein 31, 1000 City of Brussels, Brussels-Capital Region, Belgium
- Coordinates: 50°51′05″N 4°21′13″E
- Opening: 1895 (131 years ago)
- Closed: 2020
- Owner: Lone Star Funds

Technical details
- Floor area: 952 m^{2} (10,250 sq ft)

Design and construction
- Architects: 1872–1874: Antoine Trappeniers; 1891–1895: Alban Chambon
- Designations: Protected (28/02/2002)

Other information
- Number of rooms: 251
- Number of suites: 22
- Number of restaurants: 1 (Café Métropole)
- Public transit: 1 4 5 10 De Brouckère

Website
- www.metropolehotel.com

The Hotel Métropole is a currently closed five-star luxury hotel in central Brussels, Belgium. It was built in 1872–1874 in an eclectic style with neo-Renaissance and Louis XVI influences. The hotel opened in 1895 and was the only 19th-century hotel still in operation in Brussels, until it closed due to the COVID-19 pandemic in April 2020, after 125 years of continuous operation. The hotel had 251 rooms and 22 spacious suites. It was sold in 2022 and the new owners announced plans to restore it and reopen it.

The hotel is located at 31, place de Brouckère/De Brouckèreplein, next to the Boulevard Adolphe Max/Adolphe Maxlaan and the Northern Gallery glazed shopping arcade, as well as Brussels' busiest shopping street, the Rue Neuve/Nieuwstraat.

== History ==
=== Origins and early history ===
Under the reign of King Leopold II, following the covering of the river Senne (1867–1871), Brussels was remodelled with large boulevards and green avenues. The then-mayor of the City of Brussels, Jules Anspach, contributed to the transformation of the urban landscape of the capital by the realisation of thoroughfares from the North Station to the South Station, including from south to north and from west to east: the Boulevard Maurice Lemonnier/Maurice Lemonnierlaan, the Boulevard Anspach/Anspachlaan, the Boulevard Adolphe Max/Adolphe Maxlaan, and the Boulevard Émile Jacqmain/Émile Jacqmainlaan.

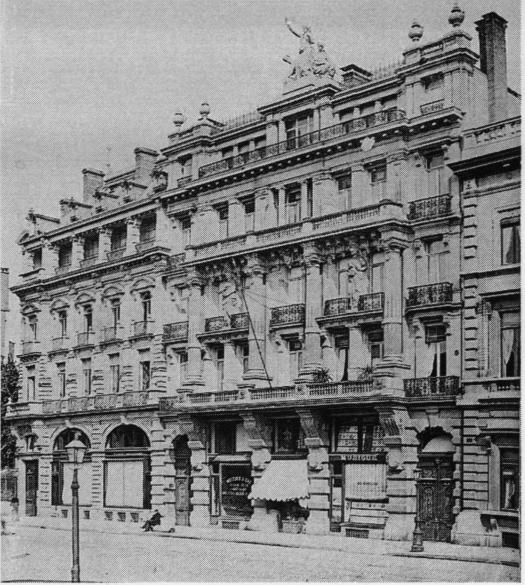
The Café Métropole, c. 1870–1890

In 1890, Prosper and Edouard Wielemans, two brothers with a brewing company, opened the Café Métropole on the Place de Brouckère/De Brouckèreplein—a major square on the new boulevards—as a place to sell their beer. The café was a huge success, and in 1891, the Wielemans-Ceuppens family purchased the next-door building, a former property of the Caisse générale d'épargne et de retraite (ASLK/CGER), and turned it into the Hotel Métropole, inaugurated in 1895. This main building had been built in 1872–1874 by the architect Antoine Trappeniers. The hotel's former reception desk is still easily recognisable today as the former bank's desk.

Following their purchase, the Wielemans brothers commissioned the French architect Alban Chambon, who was already responsible for the decoration of the Café Métropole, to design a luxurious hotel of international class. Chambon called upon the best artists and craftsmen of the time to assist him in his work. Nowadays, Chambon's design is still a prominent feature of the heritage hotel, which is considered an important historical landmark in the city. Not only was the Hotel Métropole one of the first luxury hotels, it was also the first to have electricity and central heating, and was until 2020 the only surviving 19th-century hotel in Brussels.

=== 20th century ===
In the 20th century, the hotel was enlarged by successive annexations of neighbouring buildings to occupy almost the entire block between the Place de Brouckère, the Rue Fossé aux Loups/Wolvengracht, the Rue Neuve/Nieuwstraat, and the Northern Gallery glazed shopping arcade, and split by the Impasse du Cheval/Paardgang. The most remarkable extension was that of the 3,000-seater Métropole Cinema, carried out in Art Deco style by the architect Adrien Blomme and inaugurated in 1932, which included a projection room, a tavern, shops, a disco La Frégate and two floors of supplementary hotel rooms with a patio above the cinema.

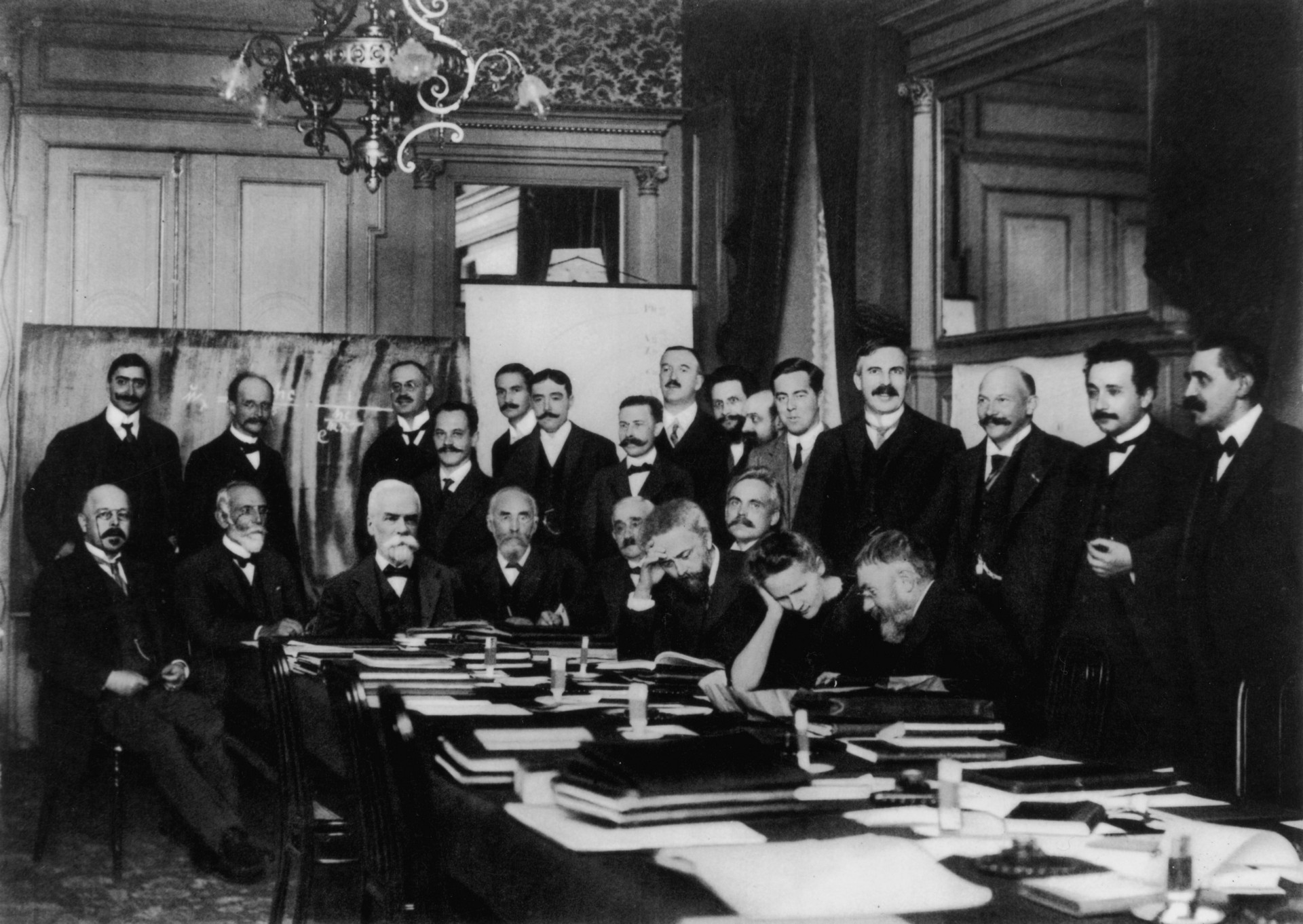
The 1911 Solvay Conference in Brussels was the first world physics conference.

The Hotel Métropole is famous for having hosted numerous national and international events, including the first Solvay Conference on Physics and on Chemistry in 1911, which brought together personalities such as Einstein, Marie Curie and Henri Poincaré. Moreover, it is the birthplace of the Black Russian cocktail, which was created in 1949 by the barman Gustave Tops for the U.S. ambassador to Luxembourg, Perle Mesta.

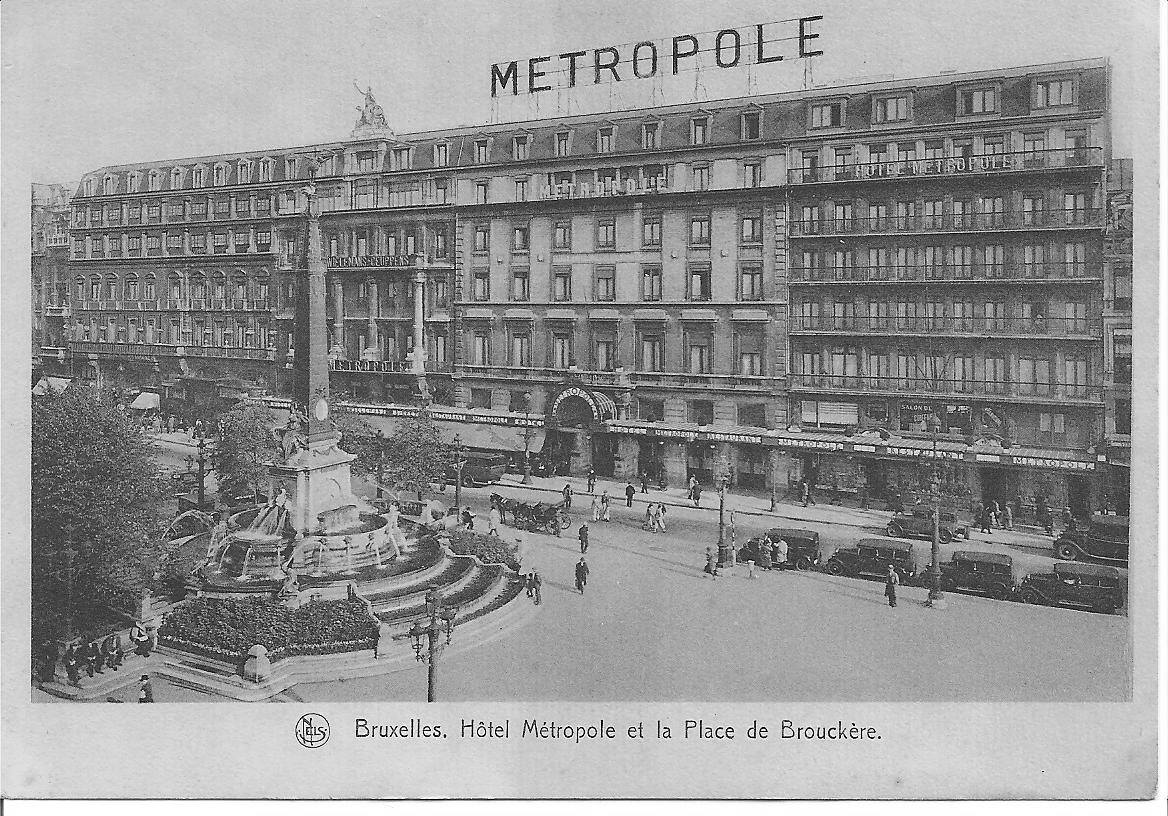
The Hotel Métropole in the 1920s

During the Second World War's occupation of Belgium, the Hotel Métropole was requisitioned by the Germans forces, then for a year by the Allied forces. After the war, the hotel experienced another golden era. Great statesmen, artists and entertainers visiting Brussels all stayed at the hotel: Eisenhower, the General De Gaulle, the Shah, Jacques Brel, Maurice Chevalier, to name a few. Toots Thielemans made his debut in the jazz orchestra that played in the Café Métropole. Annie Cordy also had her own suite in the hotel.

In the second half of the 20th century, the hotel underwent more renovation works. In 1985, Le Bar 19ème and the restaurant L'Alban Chambon were opened. Ten years later, the hotel celebrated its centenary.

=== 21st century ===
On 28 February 2002, the hotel's façade and ground floor, as well as the Belle Époque lift and ironwork, were protected by the Monuments and Sites Directorate of the Brussels-Capital Region. That same year, the restaurant was completely renovated, giving it an Italian Baroque décor. In 2011, the hotel undertook the renovation of its bar, subsequently known as Le 31. The redesigned interior combined late-19th-century decorative elements with contemporary furnishings. During the works, original ceiling frescoes were discovered and restored. Since 29 June 2015, the hotel has stood at the edge of a large pedestrian zone in central Brussels (French: Le Piétonnier). However, it remains directly accessible by car via the Rue Fossé aux Loups and the Boulevard Émile Jacqmain.

The hotel faced severe financial difficulties due to a drop in tourism after the 2016 Brussels bombings. It closed in April 2020, following the outbreak of the COVID-19 pandemic. In 2021, it was announced that the closure would be permanent. In June 2021, its former brasserie, the Café Métropole, temporarily reopened under a pop-up lease, before finally closing as well in February 2022. In November 2022, the Métropole's owners, the Bervoets family, sold the hotel to the American private equity firm Lone Star Funds for €100 million (€400,000 per room). The new owners announced that the hotel would be thoroughly renovated. In March 2025, Lone Star secured a €41 million loan for the renovation. An opening date of 2026 was announced, with the hotel set to be managed by the French group Centaurus. However, later in 2025, Lone Star Funds and Centaurus parted ways, and Centaurus sued the owners for breach of contract. No new opening date has been announced, though the restoration of the façade was completed in October 2026, when all scaffolding was removed.

== Building ==
The hotel's façade, in eclectic style with an Italian neo-Renaissance dominance, has three levels and nine bays, crowned by an attic balustrade that was maintained during the 19th-century transformation into the hotel, but was raised by two levels under a mansard roof, as today. The current modern awning, originally in iron and glass, spans the entire width of the façade and is rounded in a barrel above the entrance.

The hotel's reception, lobby, and lounge are overtly ornate in an eclectic style of French Renaissance character, with Corinthian columns, rich furnishings, gilded details, and chandeliers, largely preserved in the state made by Chambon. Similarly, the hotel's eleven meetings and conference rooms are decorated in a neo-Renaissance style. The lobby is lit by a skylight, and still conserves its original lift and main iron staircase.

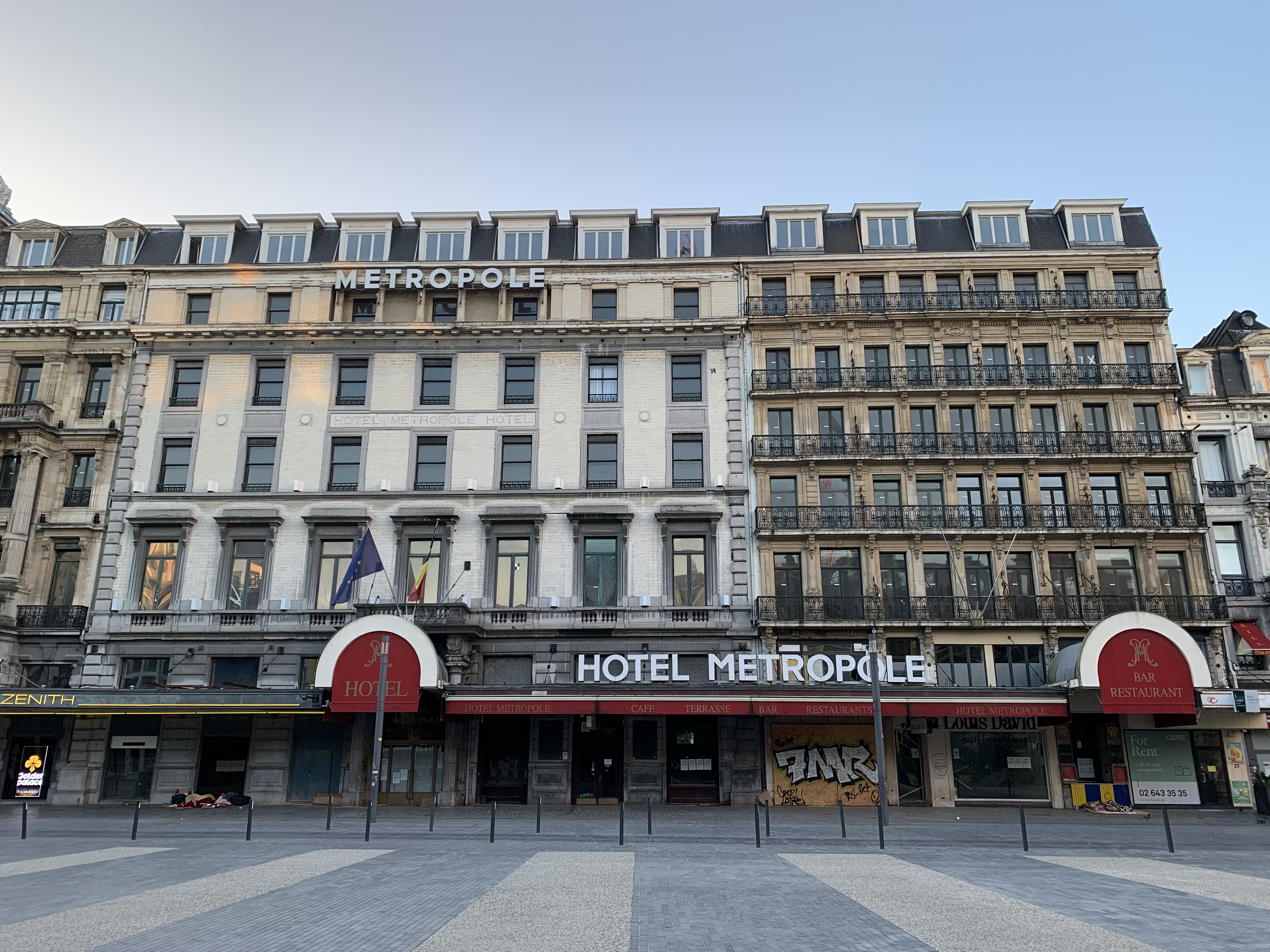
The Hotel Métropole's main façade

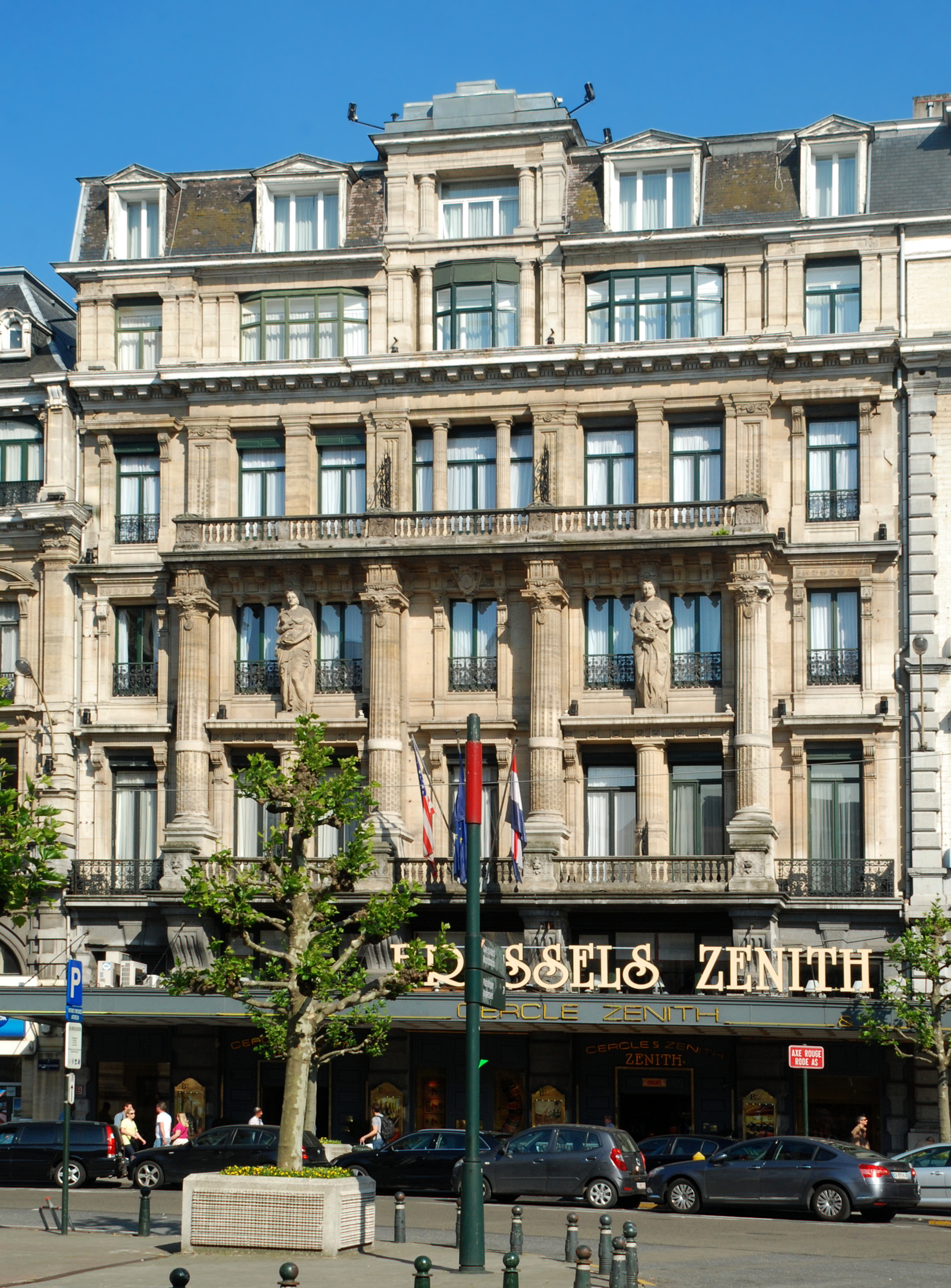
Café Métropole

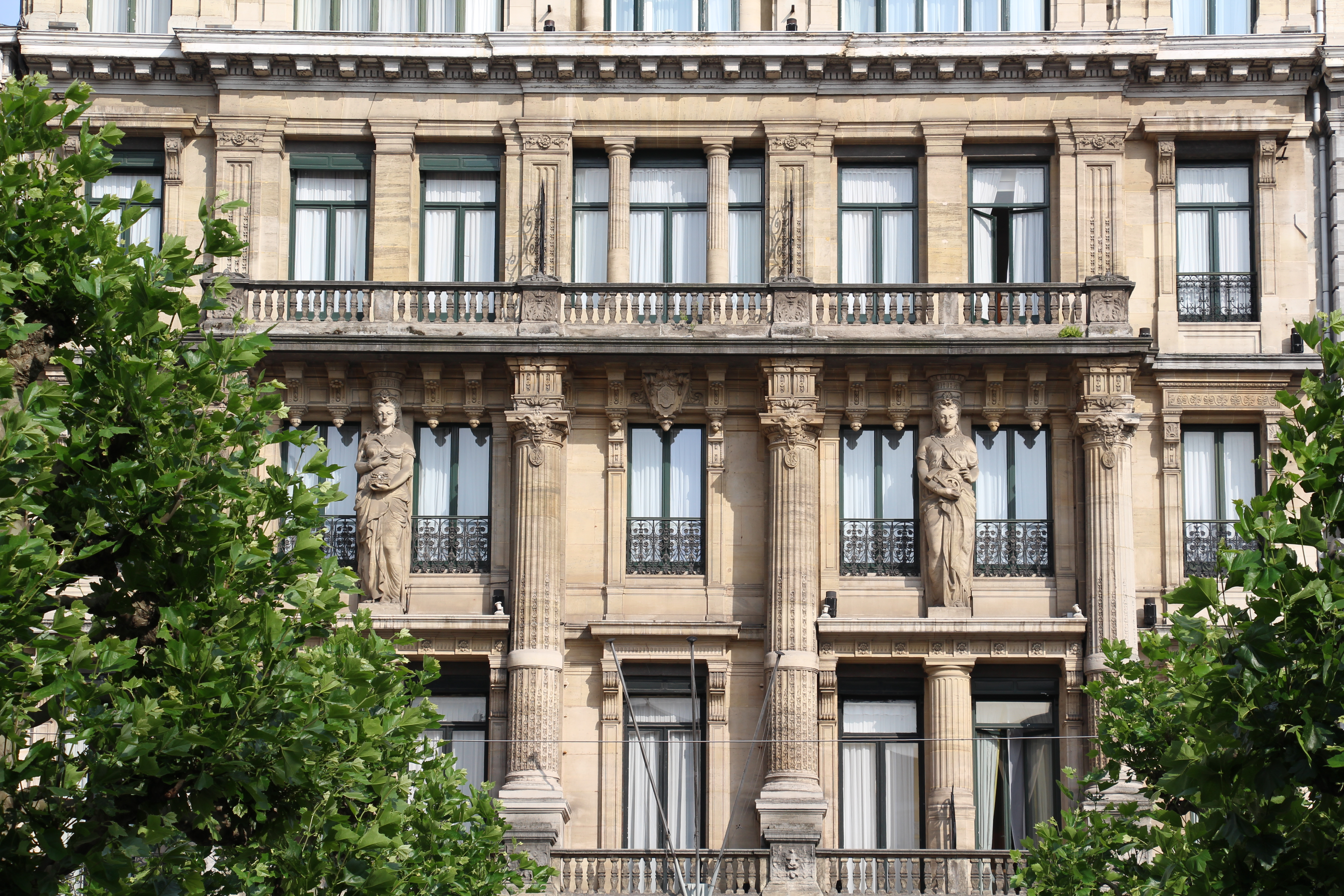
Closeup of the café's façade

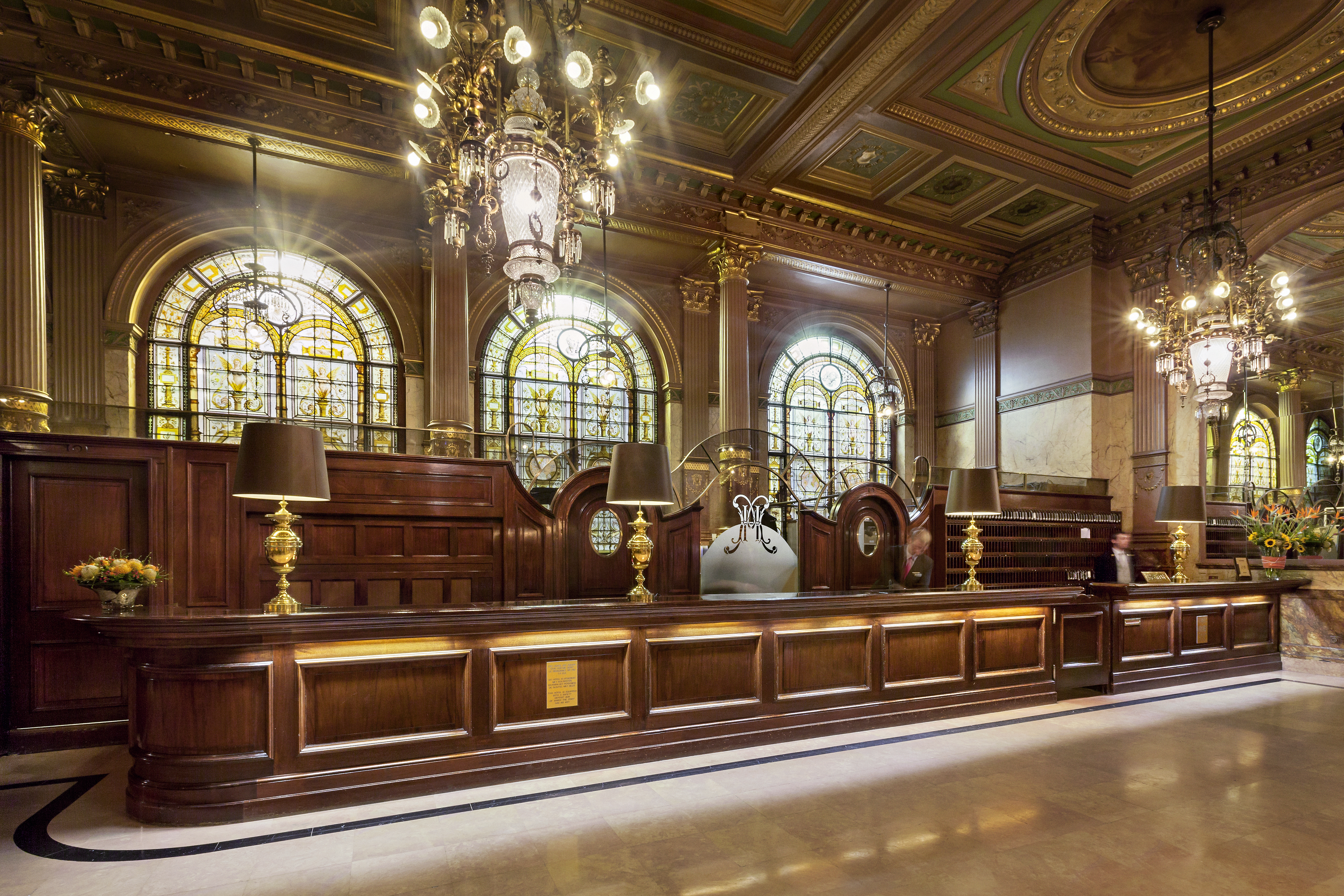
The hotel lobby

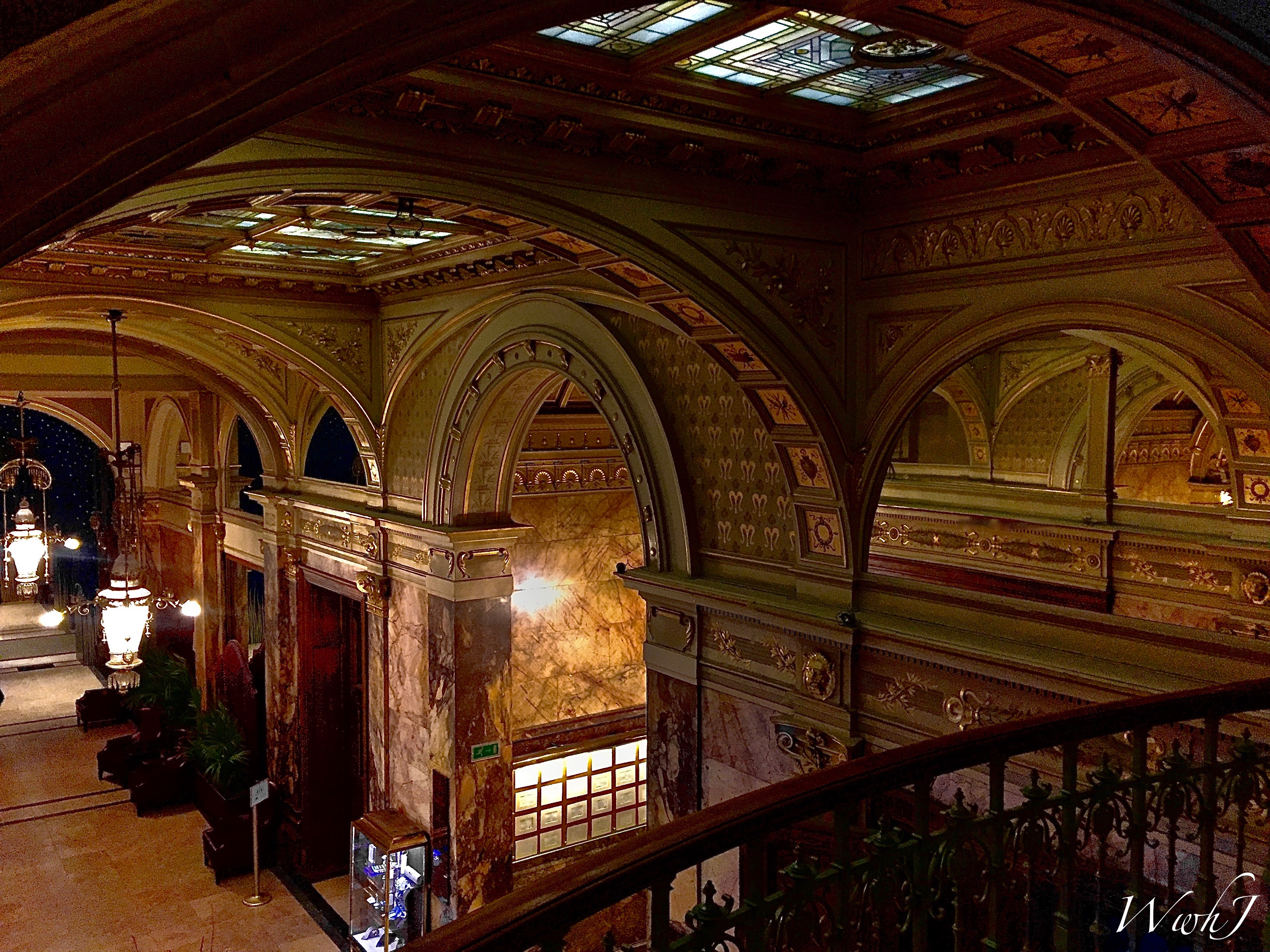
The corridor

== See also ==
- Lists of hotels
- Corinthia Grand Hotel Astoria
- Hotel Le Plaza, Brussels
- History of Brussels
- Belgium in the long nineteenth century
