= Place de Brouckère =

Square in Brussels, Belgium

Place de Brouckère (French); De Brouckèreplein (Dutch)
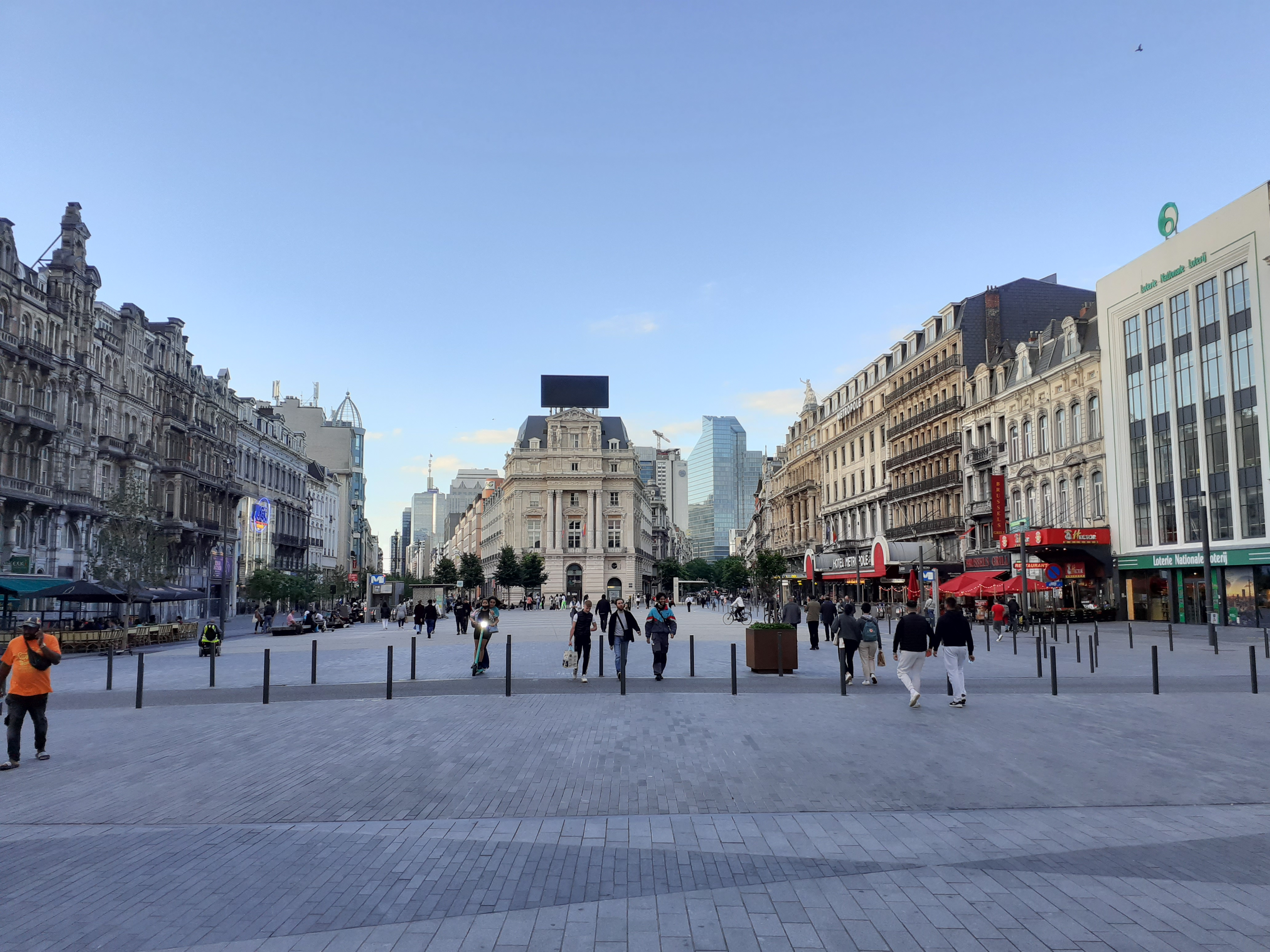
- The Place de Brouckère/De Brouckèreplein in Brussels

- Location within Brussels Location within Belgium
- Namesake: Charles de Brouckère
- Type: Square
- Length: 350 m (1,150 ft)
- Width: 50 m (160 ft)
- Location: City of Brussels, Brussels-Capital Region, Belgium
- Quarter: Marais–Jacqmain Quarter
- Postal code: 1000
- Nearest metro station: 1 5 De Brouckère
- Coordinates: 50°51′05″N 04°21′09″E

Construction
- Completion: c. 1870

Other
- Designer: Léon Suys

The Place de Brouckère (French, pronounced [plas də bʁu.kɛʁ]) or De Brouckèreplein (Dutch, pronounced [də ˈbrukɛr(ə)ˌplɛin]) is a major square in central Brussels, Belgium. It was created following the covering of the river Senne (1867–1871), replacing the Temple of the Augustinians, which was demolished in 1893. It is named in honour of Charles de Brouckère, a former mayor of the City of Brussels and professor at the Free University of Brussels, who played an important political role during the Belgian Revolution of 1830. The square measures approximately 50 by 350 metres (160 by 1,150 ft) and is nearly entirely paved.

The Place de Brouckère is located in the perspective of the Boulevard Émile Jacqmain/Émile Jacqmainlaan and the Boulevard Adolphe Max/Adolphe Maxlaan to the north, forming a "Y" crossroad, and the Boulevard Anspach/Anspachlaan to the south. The area around the square is characterised by the presence of theatres, a cinema, hotels and restaurants, as well as some of the city's main entertainment venues and shopping streets. It is served by the metro and premetro (underground tram) station De Brouckère on lines 1, 4, 5 and 10.

== History ==
=== Early history ===
The Place de Brouckère was laid out following the covering of the river Senne (1867–1871), as part of the major urban works by the architect Léon Suys under the tenure of the then-mayor of the City of Brussels, Jules Anspach. It took the place of the former Temple of the Augustinians. This church, built at the beginning of the 17th century in the Brabantine Baroque style, was the only remaining part of a convent destroyed in 1796 by French revolutionaries. The work to cover the river, which nearly surrounded the church, preserved the building's integrity at great trouble and expense, but it was finally demolished in 1893, its style no longer popular with the people and its presence unsuitable for the area. Its façade's masonry, however, was preserved, being disassembled and reconstructed as the façade of the Church of the Holy Trinity in Ixelles.

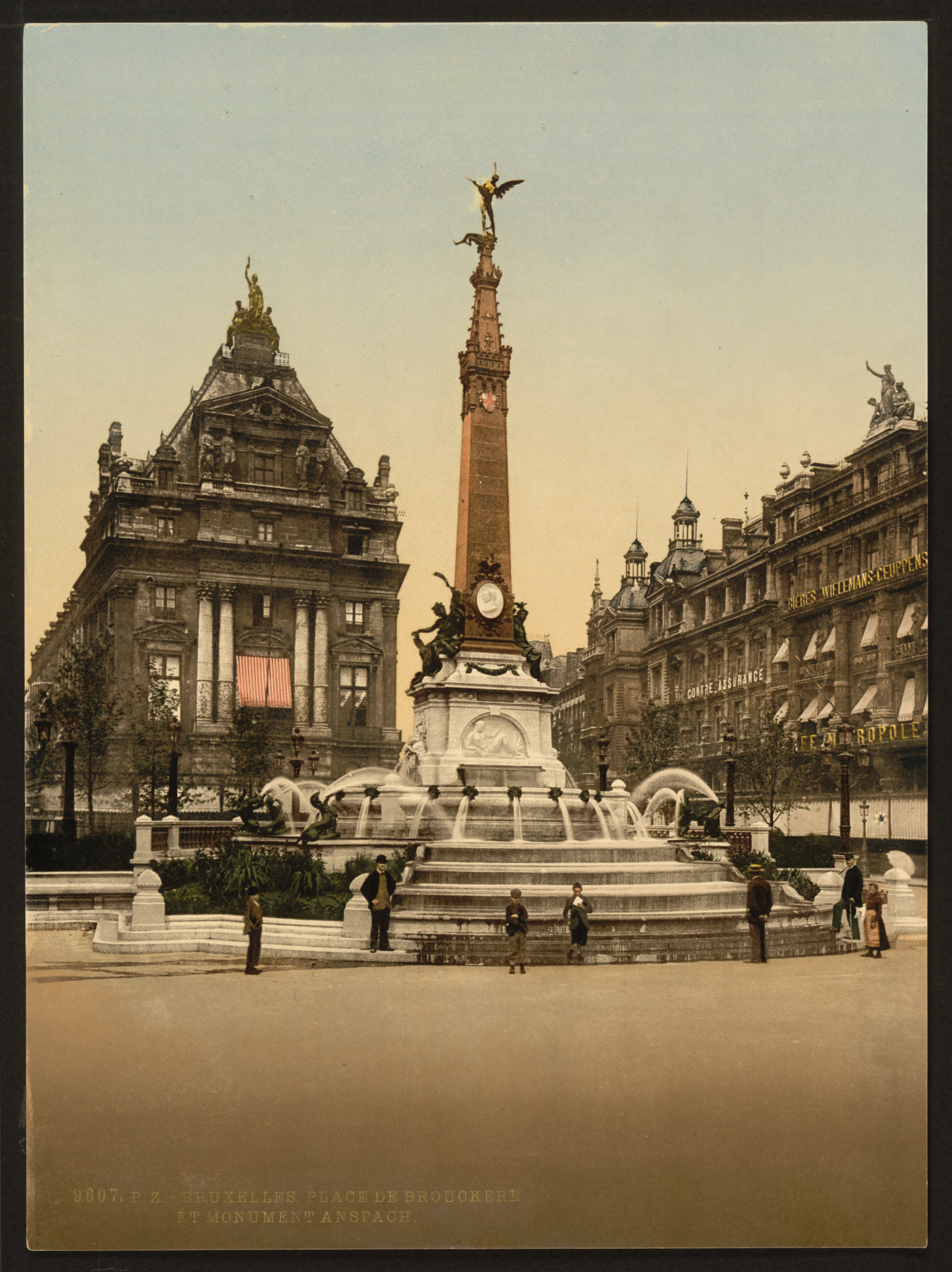
The Place de Brouckère/De Brouckèreplein with the Anspach Fountain in the late 19th century

In the centre of the square, left empty by the destruction of the church, a granite fountain-obelisk dedicated to the memory of Jules Anspach, by the architect Charles-Émile Janlet, was erected. Inaugurated in 1897, the Anspach Fountain was surmounted by a bronze effigy of Saint Michael, the patron saint of the City of Brussels, slaying a dragon or demon. This monument stood exactly in the axis of the Boulevard Anspach/Anspachlaan, like a regulator of traffic at the birth of the fork between the Boulevard Émile Jacqmain/Émile Jacqmainlaan and the Boulevard Adolphe Max/Adolphe Maxlaan. Inseparable from the monumental perspective of the boulevards—and yet moved following the works of the metro—it is, through its dedication and former location, a tribute to Anspach.

For its role as a prestigious central square, its triangular configuration, and the presence of cinemas and theatres all around it, including the former Continental and Métropole café-hotels, La Scala theatre and Eldorado cinema (today's UGC De Brouckère), the Place de Brouckère could have been compared to a mini-Broadway in Brussels from the 1930s to 1960s, when large illuminated advertisements lit the square from the rooftops. Its appearance back then earned it international fame, and it was referenced in many works of music, among them Django Reinhardt's jazz song Place De Brouckère (1942). On 4 September 1944, the square was the scene of great jubilation during the liberation of Brussels by the British Guards Armoured Division. In the 1950s, it hosted one of the tourist pavilions of the 1958 Brussels World’s Fair (Expo 58), built especially for the occasion.

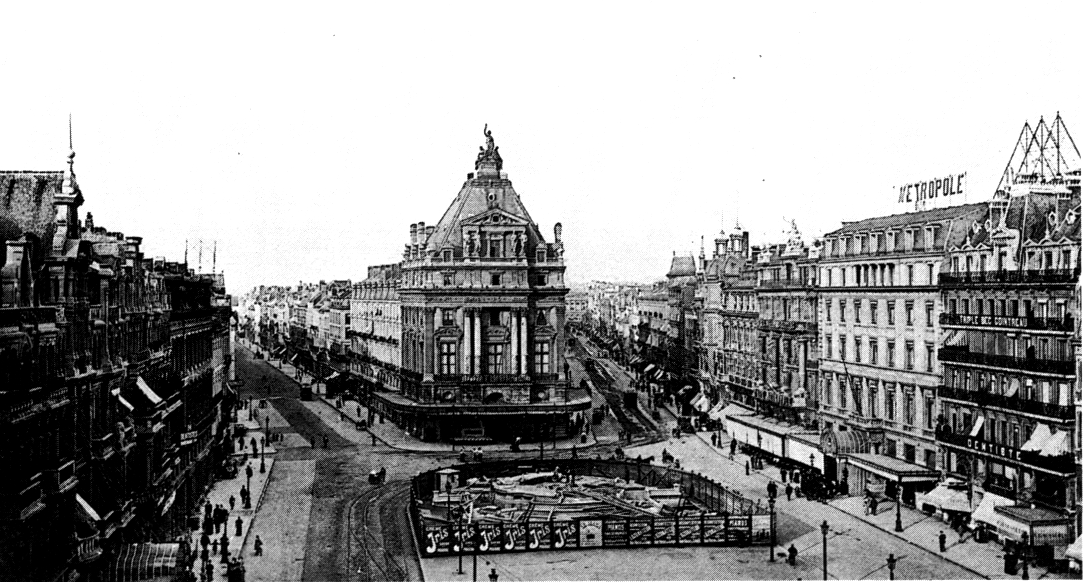
The Place de Brouckère after the demolition of the Temple of the Augustinians. In the foreground, the Anspach Fountain is under construction.

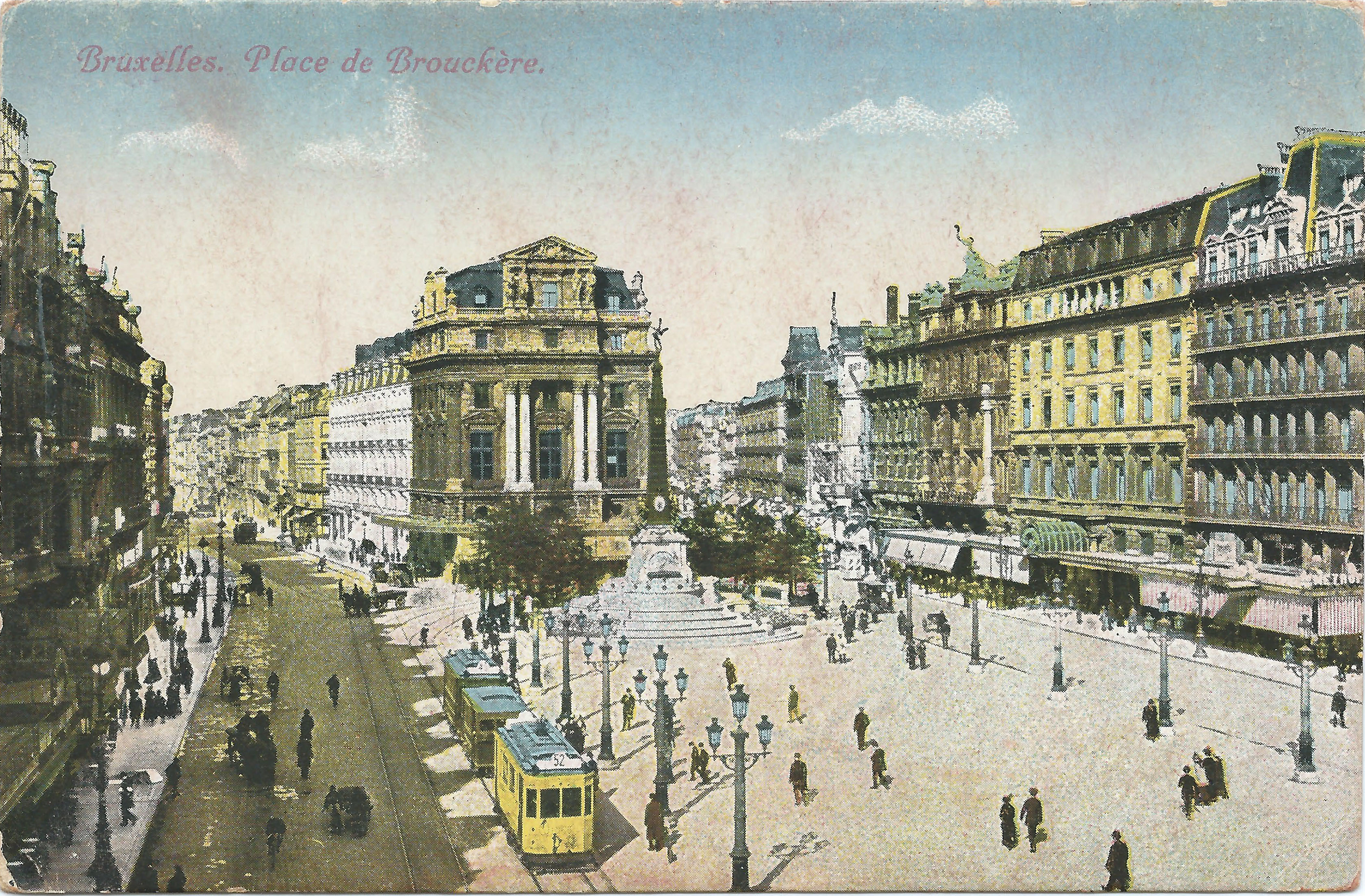
The square on a pre-1930 postcard. Note the lower roof of the Hotel Continental.

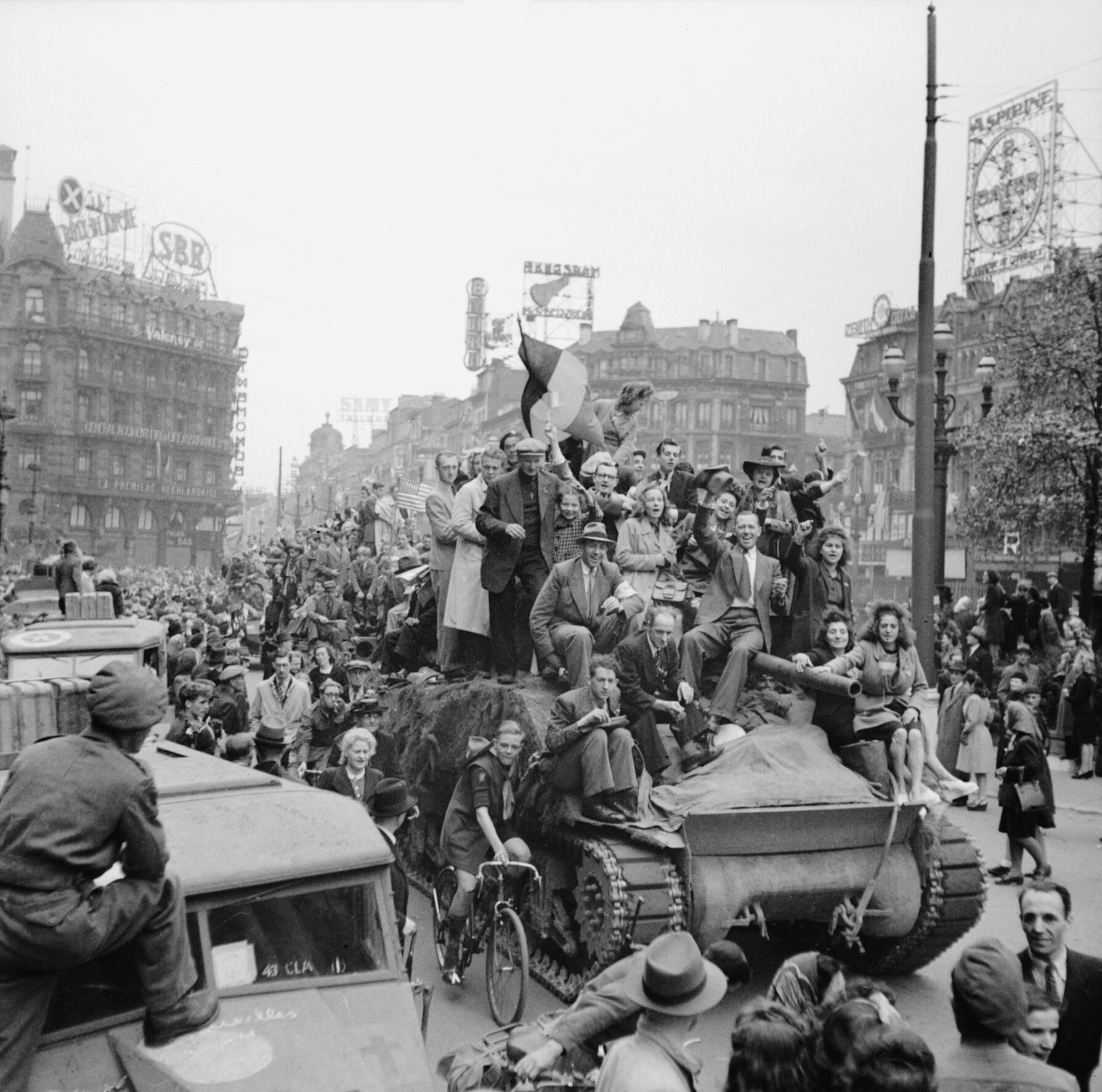
British tanks arrive in Brussels on 4 September 1944, ending the German occupation

=== Redevelopment (1960s–present) ===
The south-eastern sides of the Place de Brouckère were razed in 1967–1971, at the same time as the two blocks delimited by the Place de la Monnaie/Muntplein, the Rue de l'Évêque/Bisschopsstraat, the Rue de Laeken/Lakensestraat, the Rue des Augustins/Augustijnenstraat and the Rue du Fossé aux Loups/Wolvengracht, to make room for the modernist Monnaie Center by the architects Jacques Cuisinier, Jean Gilson, André and Jean Polak and Robert Schuiten, as well as the Philips Tower by Structures Architectural Bureau. On that occasion, car traffic was channelled in the square's centre between wide pavement-terraces fitted out in the "above-ground" style of the time with the addition of numerous benches, trees and planters.

The Anspach Fountain was dismantled and removed in 1973 to make way for access to De Brouckère metro station. The authorities had promised to put it back in place after the works, but it was eventually reinstalled in May 1981 in a basin that occupies the space between the Quai aux Briques/Baksteenkaai and the Quai au Bois à Brûler/Brandhoutkaai, in the Quays or Sainte-Catherine/Sint-Katelijne Quarter, some 700 metres (2,300 ft) from the Place de Brouckère.

If today almost all the signs have disappeared from the Place de Brouckère (with the exception of the Coca-Cola sign on the roof of the Hotel Continental), various attempts at revitalising the square are underway to bring it back to its heyday. In 2014, the City of Brussels' then-mayor, Yvan Mayeur, declared his wish to turn the square into "A Times Square in the centre of Brussels". Since 29 June 2015, the square has been pedestrianised, as part of a large pedestrian zone in central Brussels (French: Le Piétonnier). On that occasion, it was partially restored to its original appearance and was repaved.

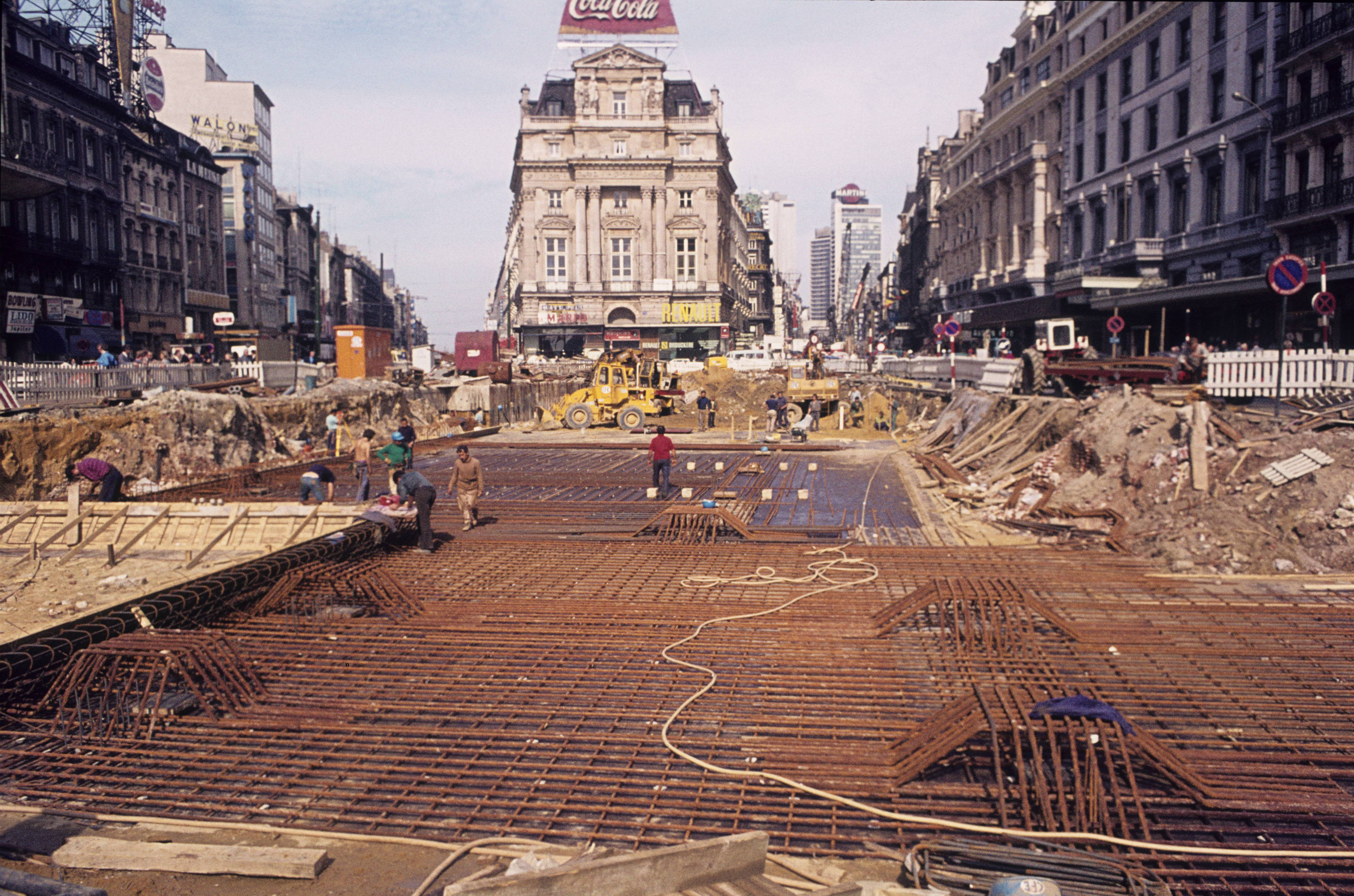
The square in 1974 during the construction of De Brouckère metro station

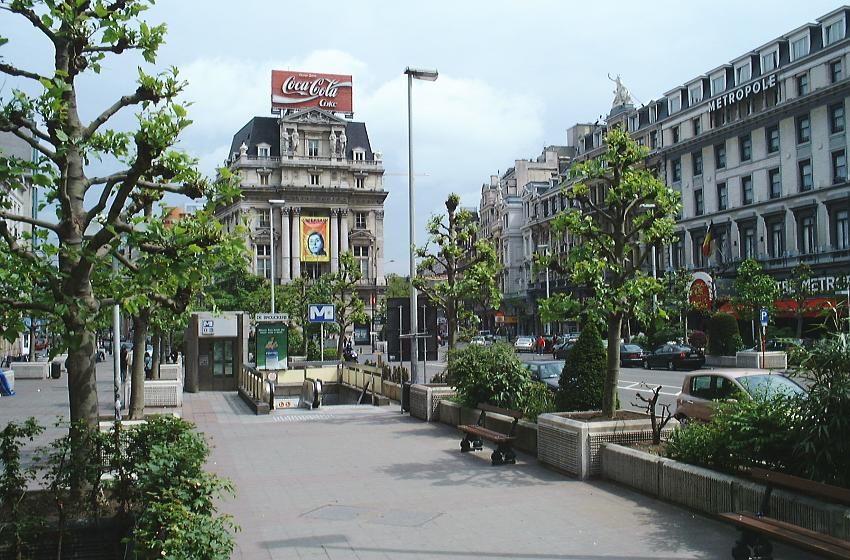
The square in 2007, before its pedestrianisation and renovation

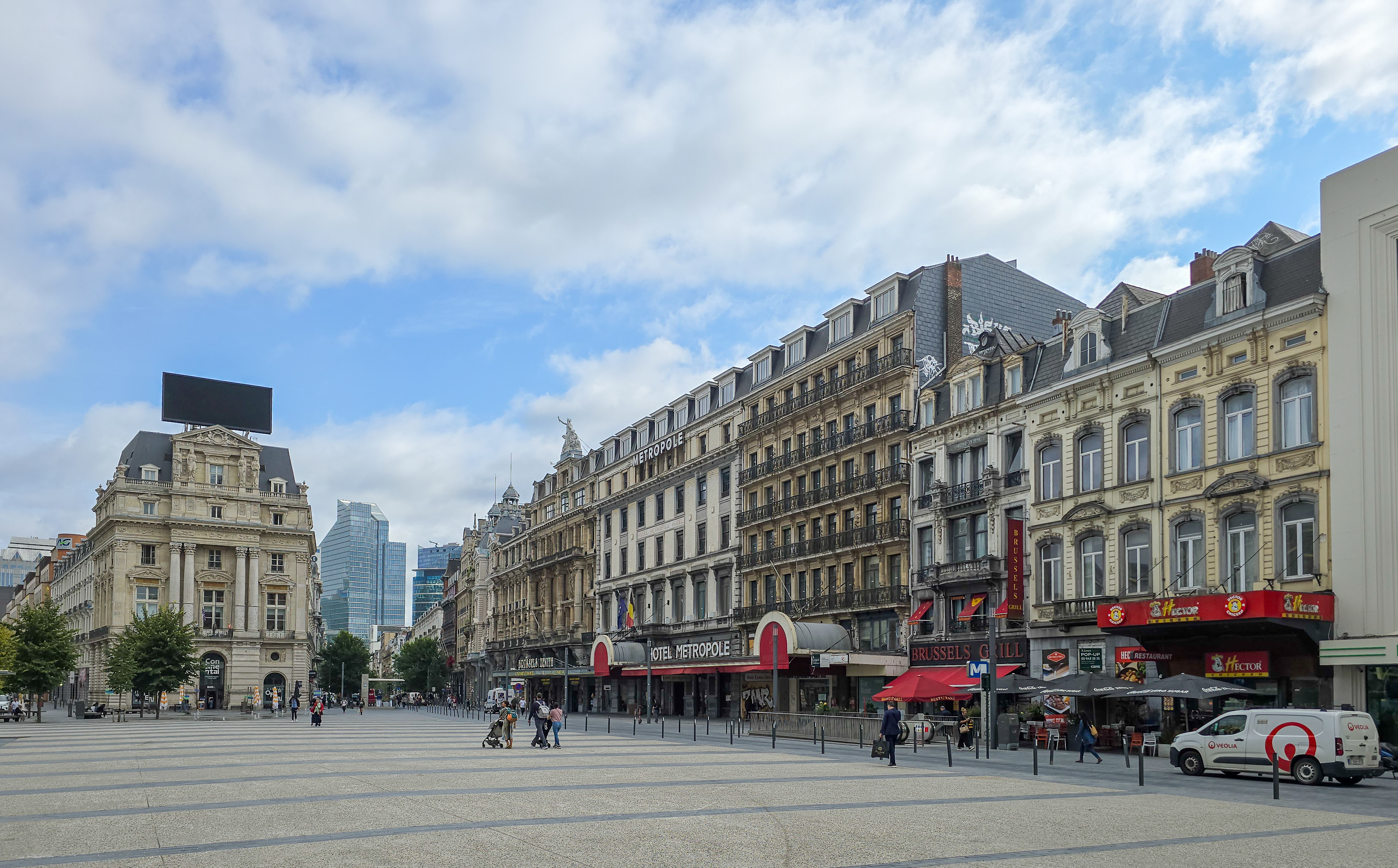
The square as it appears today

== Places of interest ==
The Place de Brouckère is dominated by fin de siècle buildings, but modern colossi (most notably the Multi Tower and Monnaie Center) have also risen on its southern side since the 1960s. The focal point is the Hotel Continental (1874) by the architect Eugène Carpentier, an eclectic building well recognisable to the people of Brussels because of the large luminous Coca-Cola sign on its roof. This roof, which was originally topped with an imposing copper sculptural group representing The Feast by Louis Samain, was considerably simplified following a fire that ravaged the building in 1901.

The eastern side of the square is home to the Hotel Métropole (1895), a former five-star luxury hotel originally designed by the architects Antoine Trappeniers and Alban Chambon, where the first Solvay Conference on Physics and on Chemistry was held in the autumn of 1911. It was the only 19th-century hotel still in operation in Brussels in the 21st century until it closed its doors in April 2020 after 125 years of continuous operation. As of 1 January 2022, its former brasserie, the Café Métropole, located next door, remains in use. The Northern Gallery, an elegant 19th-century glazed shopping arcade also ends there. On the south-eastern side, next to the metro station's main entrances, are two covered shopping galleries: the Anspach Gallery and The Mint.

On the opposite side of the square stands a set of seven apartment buildings in an eclectic style with a dominant neo-Gothic influence, designed by the architect Léon Jules De Blois in 1873–1876. Next to it is another set of commercial buildings grouped together behind an austere façade of neoclassical inspiration, dating from 1872. The ensemble includes the former Eldorado cinema (1906), now the UGC De Brouckère, with its Grand Room featuring African-themed Art Deco motifs designed by the architect Marcel Chabot in 1931–32. This cinema complex has been listed as a protected monument since 28 April 1994. The south-western corner with the Rue des Augustins is occupied by a more recent building.

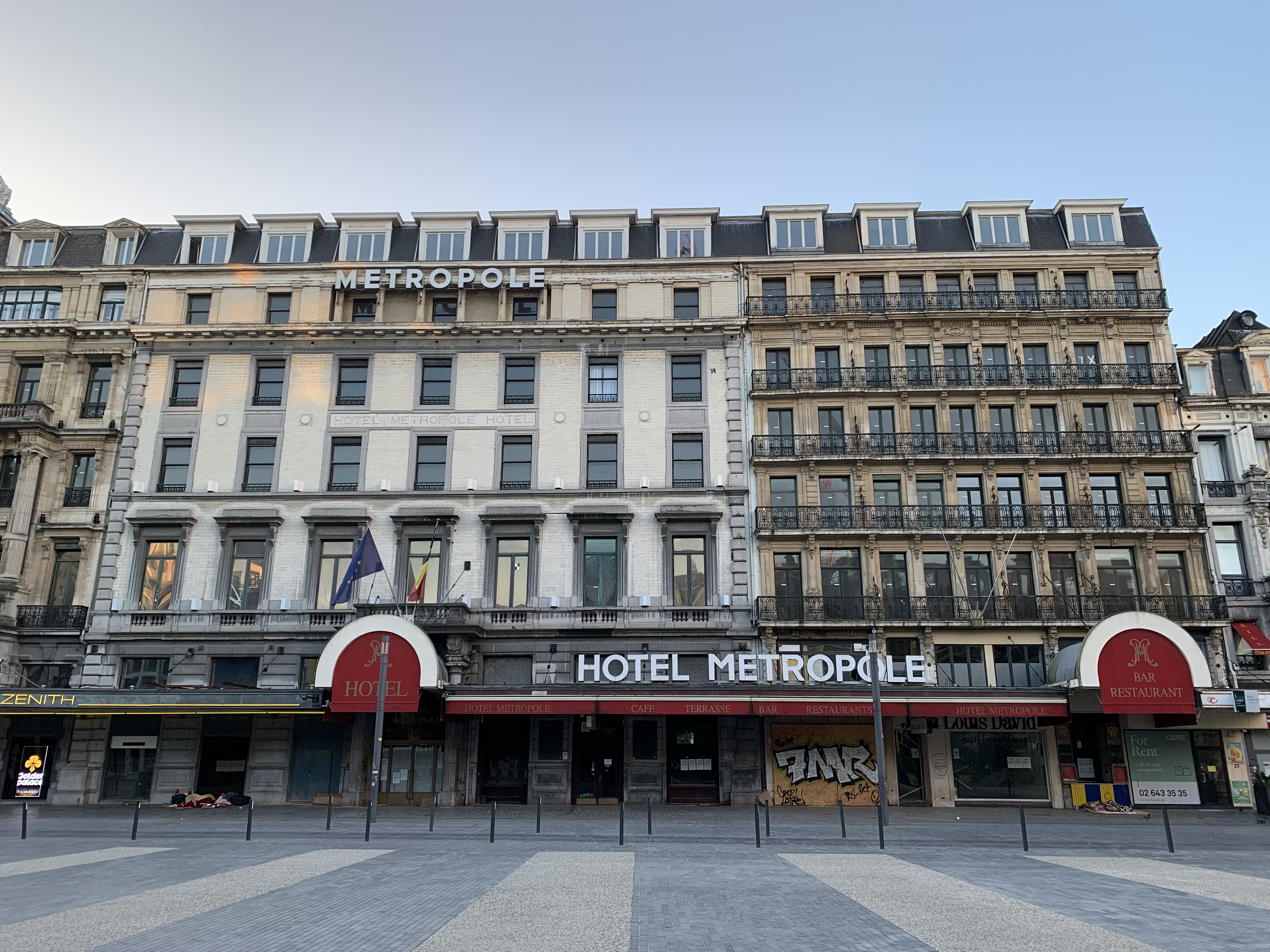
Hotel Métropole (Trappeniers, 1872–1874 and Chambon, 1895)

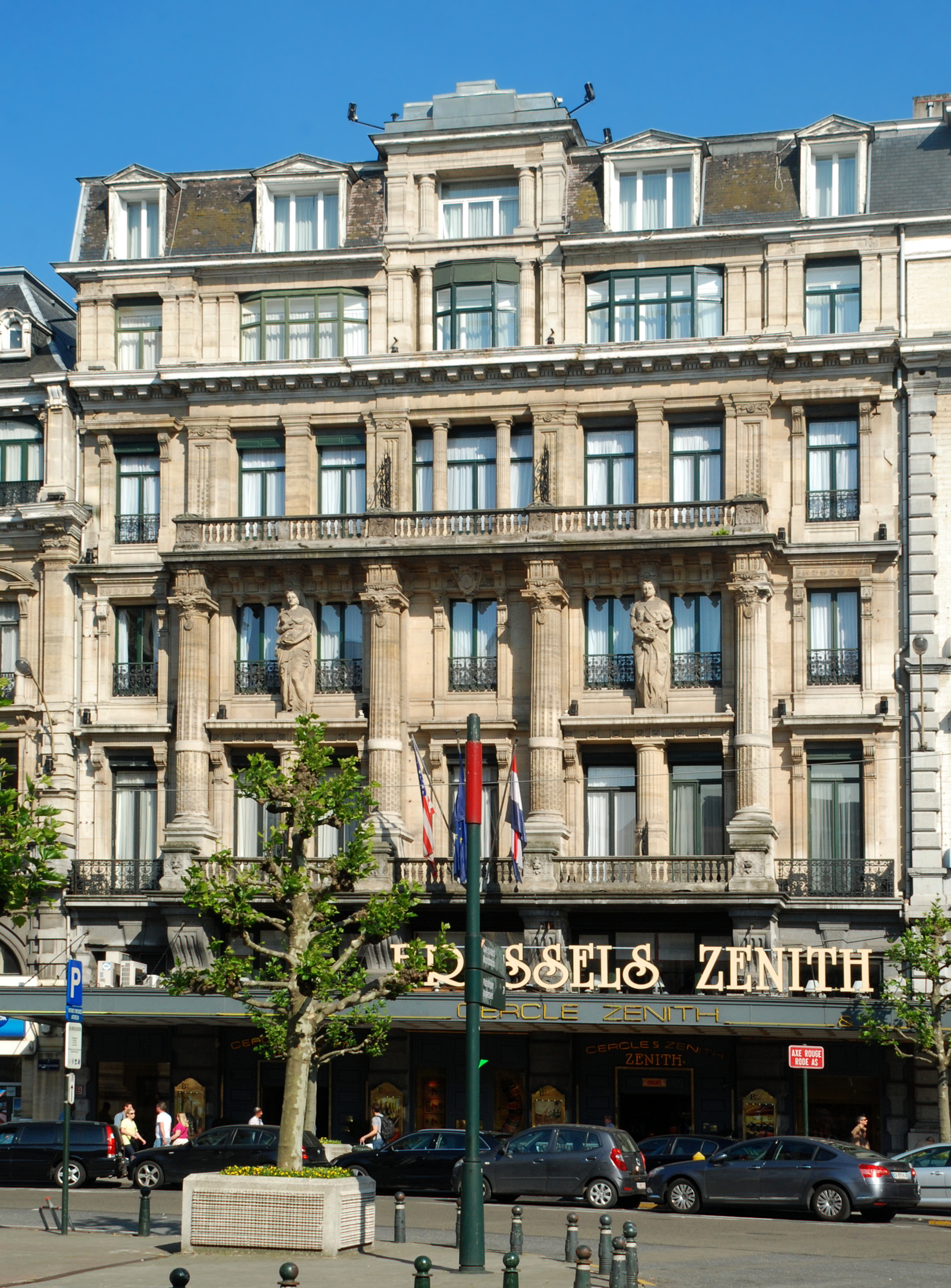
Café Métropole (Bordiau, 1872)

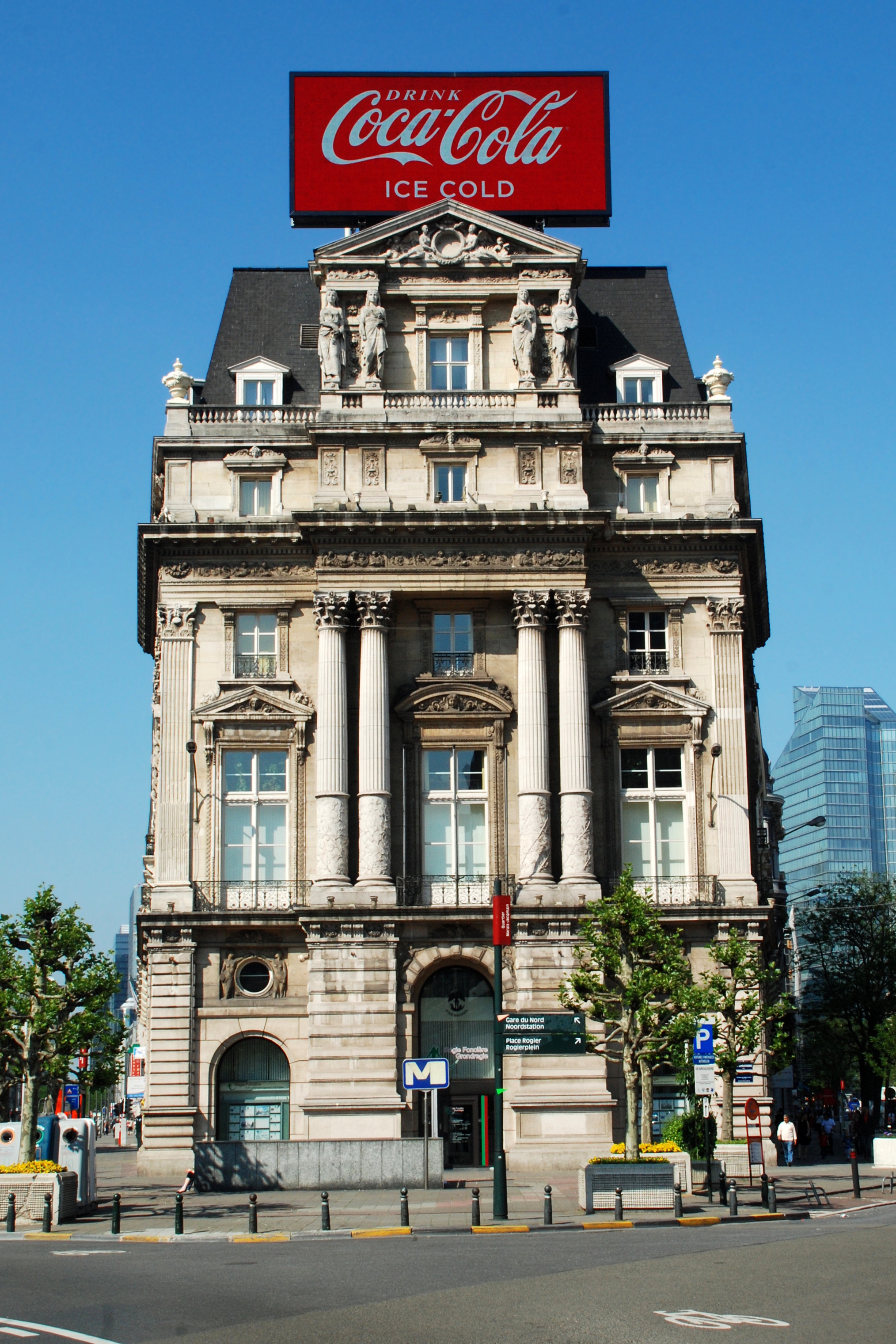
Hotel Continental (Carpentier, 1874)

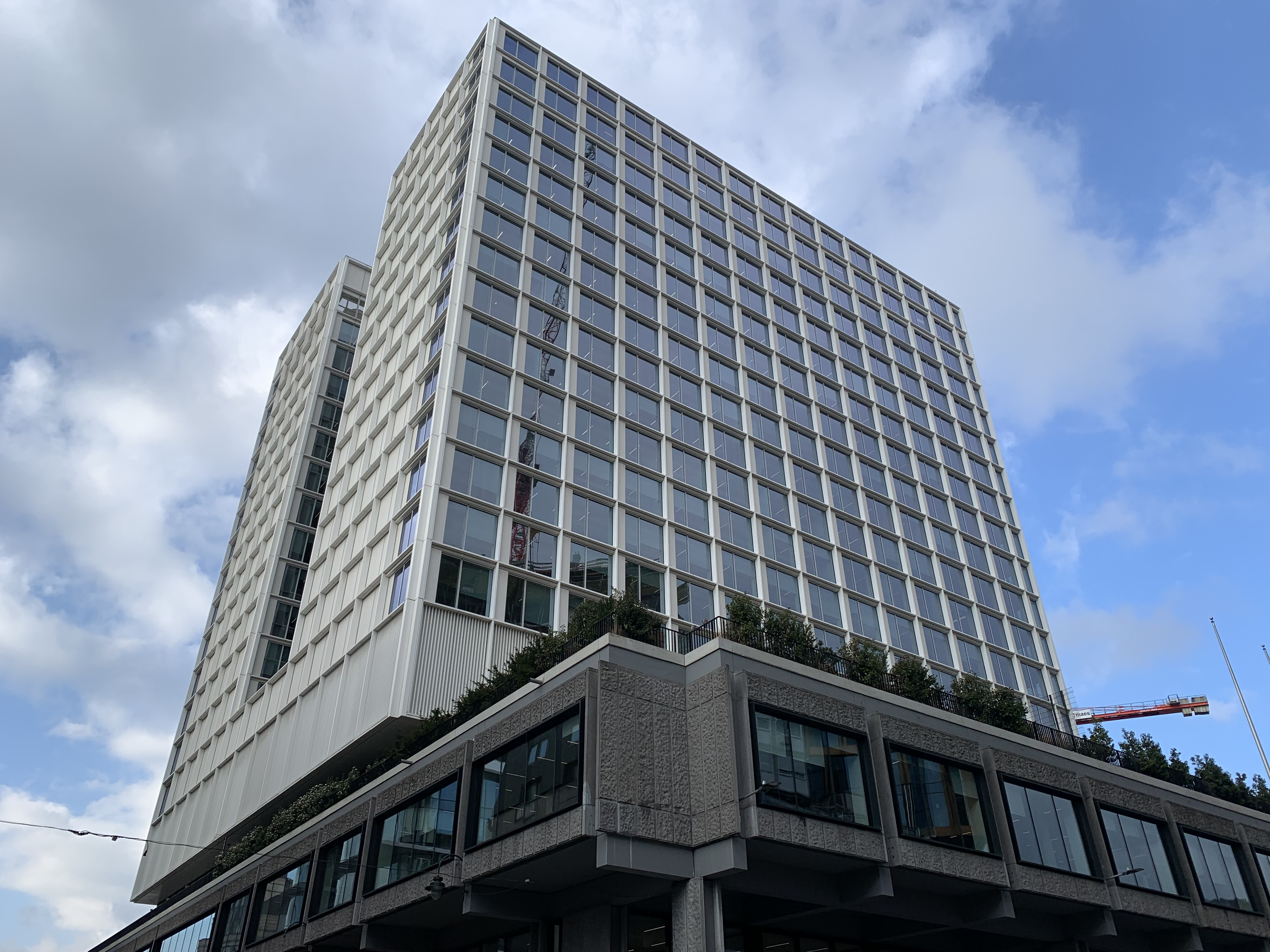
Multi Tower (Structures, 1967–1969 and Conix RBDM, 2019)

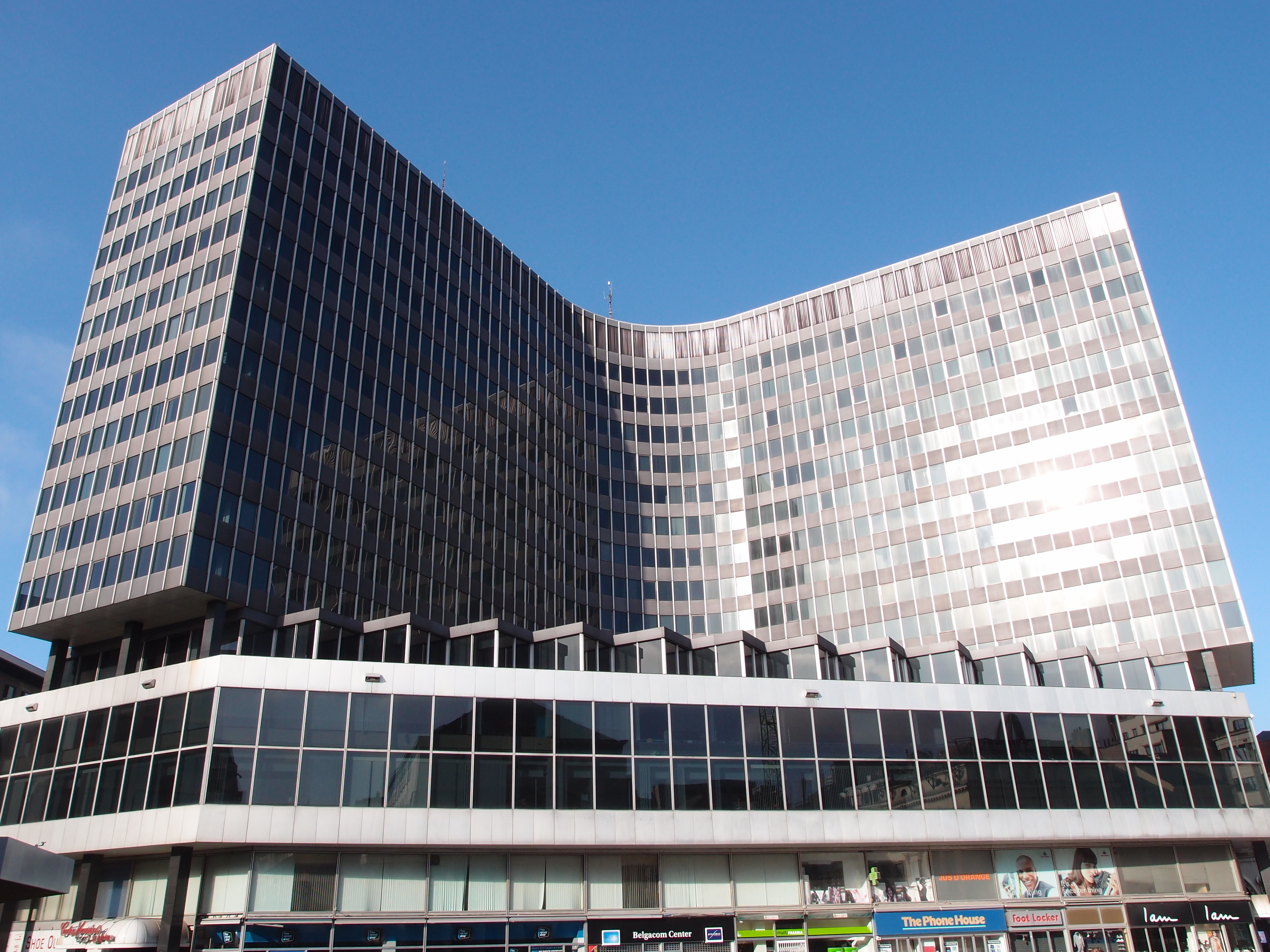
Monnaie Center (Cuisinier, Gilson, Polak and Schuiten, 1967–1971)

== Accessibility ==
Before the construction of the pedestrian zone, the Place de Brouckère was an important junction for car traffic, and it is still an important public transport hub. Beneath the square is one of the busiest stations of the Brussels Metro: De Brouckère. There the east–west lines 1 and 5 intersect the lines 4 and 10 of the North–South Axis of the premetro. The bus stop on the Rue de l'Evêque/Bisschopsstraat, which leads into the square, is also the start and end point for various city and regional bus lines.

== See also ==
- Royal Theatre of La Monnaie, an opera house close to the Place de Brouckère
- Neoclassical architecture in Belgium
- Art Deco in Brussels
- History of Brussels
- Belgium in the long nineteenth century
