= Boulevard Adolphe Max =

Thoroughfare in Brussels, Belgium

Boulevard Adolphe Max (French); Adolphe Maxlaan (Dutch)
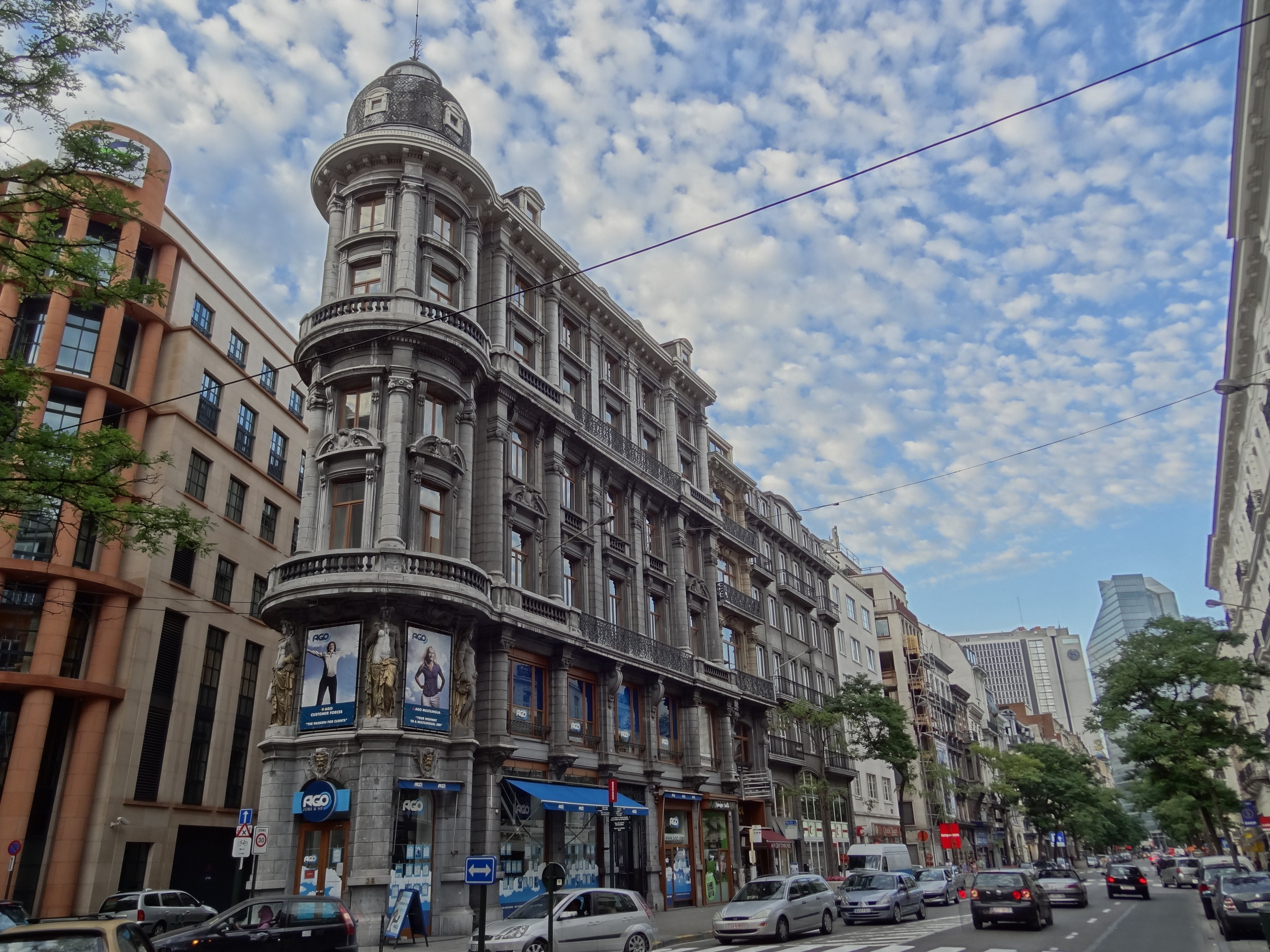
- Le Printemps building on the Boulevard Adolphe Max/Adolphe Maxlaan

- Location within Brussels Location within Belgium
- Former names: Boulevard du Nord (French); Noordlaan (Dutch)
- Part of: Central Boulevards of Brussels
- Namesake: Adolphe Max
- Type: Boulevard
- Location: City of Brussels, Brussels-Capital Region, Belgium
- Quarter: Marais–Jacqmain Quarter
- Postal code: 1000
- Coordinates: 50°51′13″N 4°21′20″E

Construction
- Completed: 1868–1871

Other
- Designer: Léon Suys

The Boulevard Adolphe Max (French, pronounced [bul.vaʁ a.dɔlf maks]) or Adolphe Maxlaan (Dutch) is a central boulevard in Brussels, Belgium. It was created following the covering of the river Senne (1867–1871), and bears the name of Adolphe Max, a former mayor of the City of Brussels.

The Boulevard Adolphe Max connects the Place de Brouckère/De Brouckèreplein to the Boulevard du Jardin botanique/Kruidtuinlaan and the Place Charles Rogier/Karel Rogierplein, in the extension of the Boulevard Anspach/Anspachlaan. It also runs parallel to Brussels' busiest shopping street, the Rue Neuve/Nieuwstraat. This area is served by the metro and premetro (underground tram) stations De Brouckère (on lines 1, 4, 5 and 10) and Rogier (on lines 2, 4, 6 and 10).

== History ==
The Boulevard Adolphe Max was laid out between 1868 and 1871, as part of the Central Boulevards, which were created after the covering of the river Senne. To stimulate the new boulevard's development, an architectural competition was organised. The first prize was awarded in 1876 to the Maison des Chats or Hier is't in den kater en de kat (loosely, "House of Cats") by the architect Henri Beyaert. The boulevard was originally named the Boulevard du Nord/Noordlaan ("North Boulevard"), since it led to the old North Station on the Place Charles Rogier/Karel Rogierplein. In 1919, it was renamed in honour of the then-mayor of the City of Brussels, Adolphe Max (1869–1939).

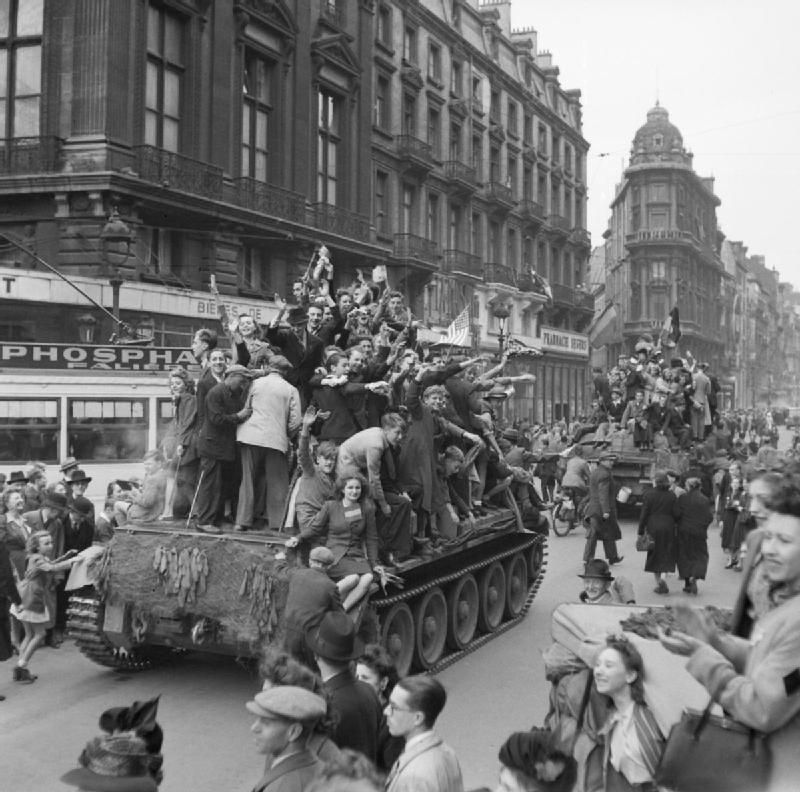
Cheering civilians ride on Cromwell tanks as British troops enter Brussels, 4 September 1944

Until the Second World War, the Boulevard Adolphe Max was one of the liveliest streets in Brussels, with renowned shops, typical Brussels cafés and an impressive number of cinemas. On 4 September 1944, it was the scene of great jubilation during the liberation of Brussels by the British Guards Armoured Division. From the 1970s, however, the area entered a period of urban decay. Almost all the old shops disappeared, and in their place, souvenir shops, snack bars and sex shops opened. The luxurious Hotel Le Plaza, located on the boulevard, also closed its doors in 1976. Since 1976, the North–South line of the Brussels premetro has run underneath the boulevard. The reopening of the Hotel Le Plaza in 1998 marked the beginning of a certain revival. By the turn of the 21st century, only a few sex cinemas remained. The last one, the ABC, closed in 2014.

In recent years, the introduction of one-way traffic on the side near the Place de Brouckère has reduced the traffic volume considerably. There are also currently plans to renovate the Boulevard Adolphe Max and its surrounding streets, as part of the broader revitalisation of the city centre.

== Notable buildings ==
The Boulevard Adolphe Max is home to many buildings in neoclassical, Beaux-Arts, Art Nouveau, Art Deco and eclectic styles. Some examples include:

- No. 1–3: Maison des Chats or Hier ist in den kater en de kat (1874), an eclectic building of neo-Flemish Renaissance inspiration, by Henri Beyaert
- No. 5–9: Hotel Atlanta (1925–1929), an Art Deco hotel by Michel Polak
- No. 11–17: Thonet House (1872), an eclectic apartment building by Félix Laureys
- No. 28–34: Le Printemps (1875), a narrow, triangle-shaped eclectic building by Adolphe Vanderheggen
- No. 104: Marivaux theatre, original neoclassical building (1873) by D.G. Marinus, Art Deco redesign (1923) by G. Hubrecht
- No. 118–126: Hotel Le Plaza (1928), an Art Deco hotel and cinema, by Alfred Hoch and Michel Polak
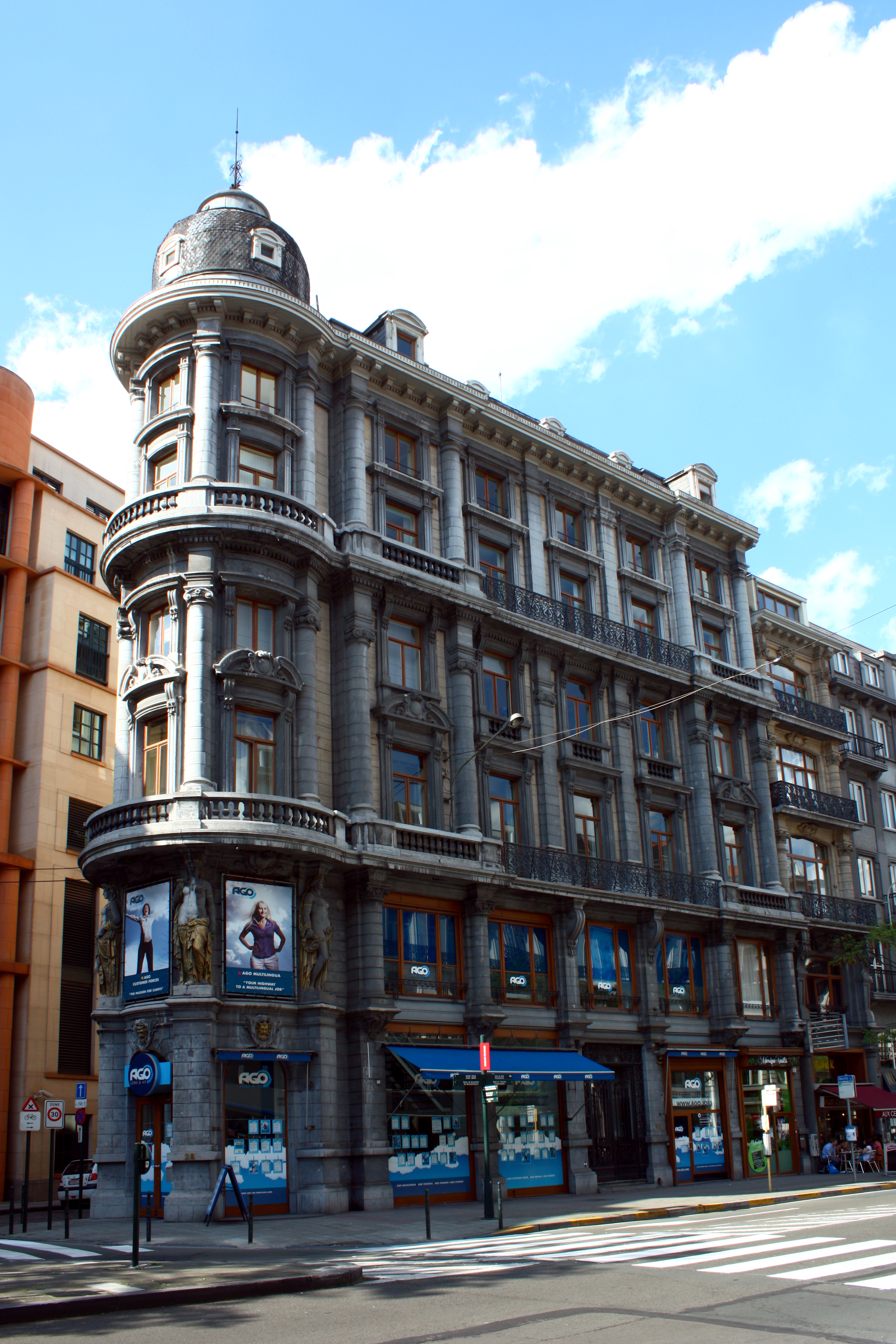
Le Printemps (Vanderheggen, 1875)

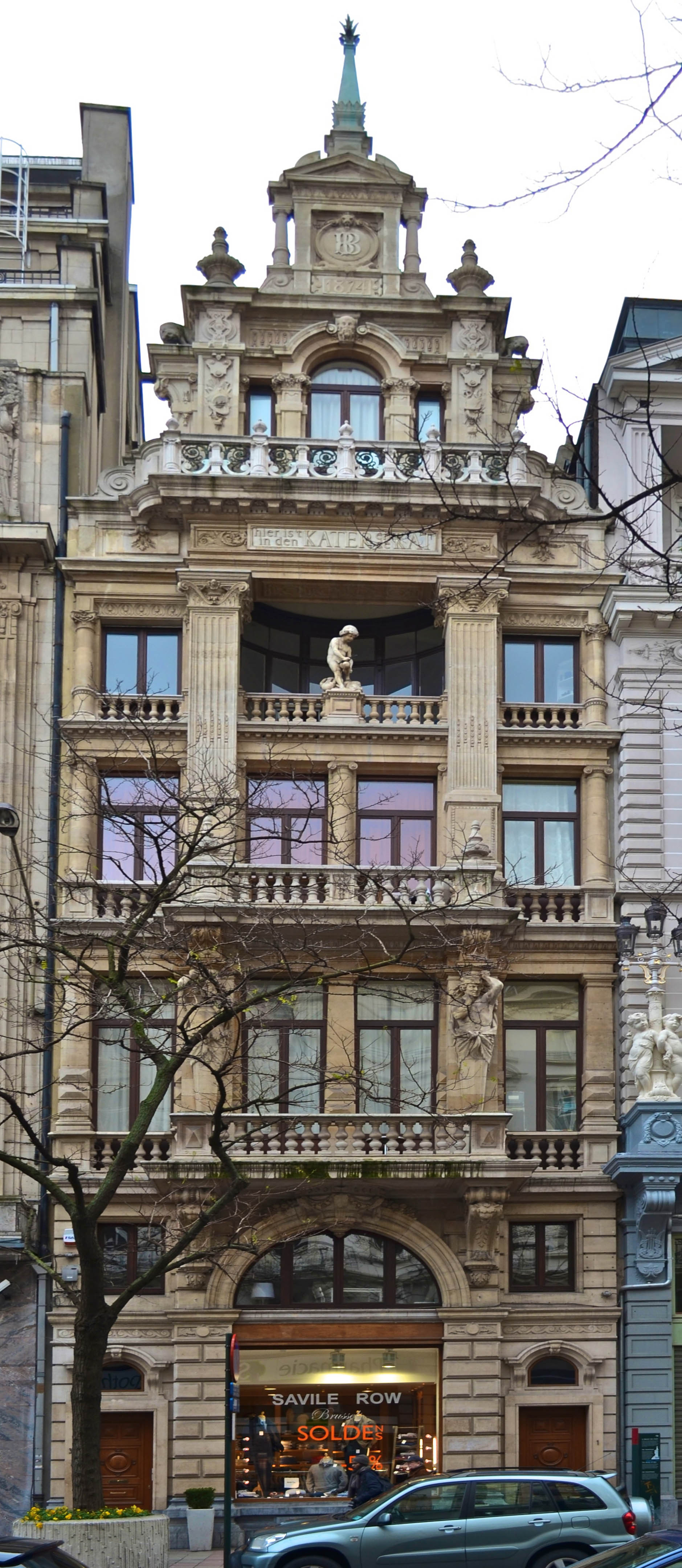
Maison des Chats or Hier ist in den kater en de kat (Beyaert, 1874)

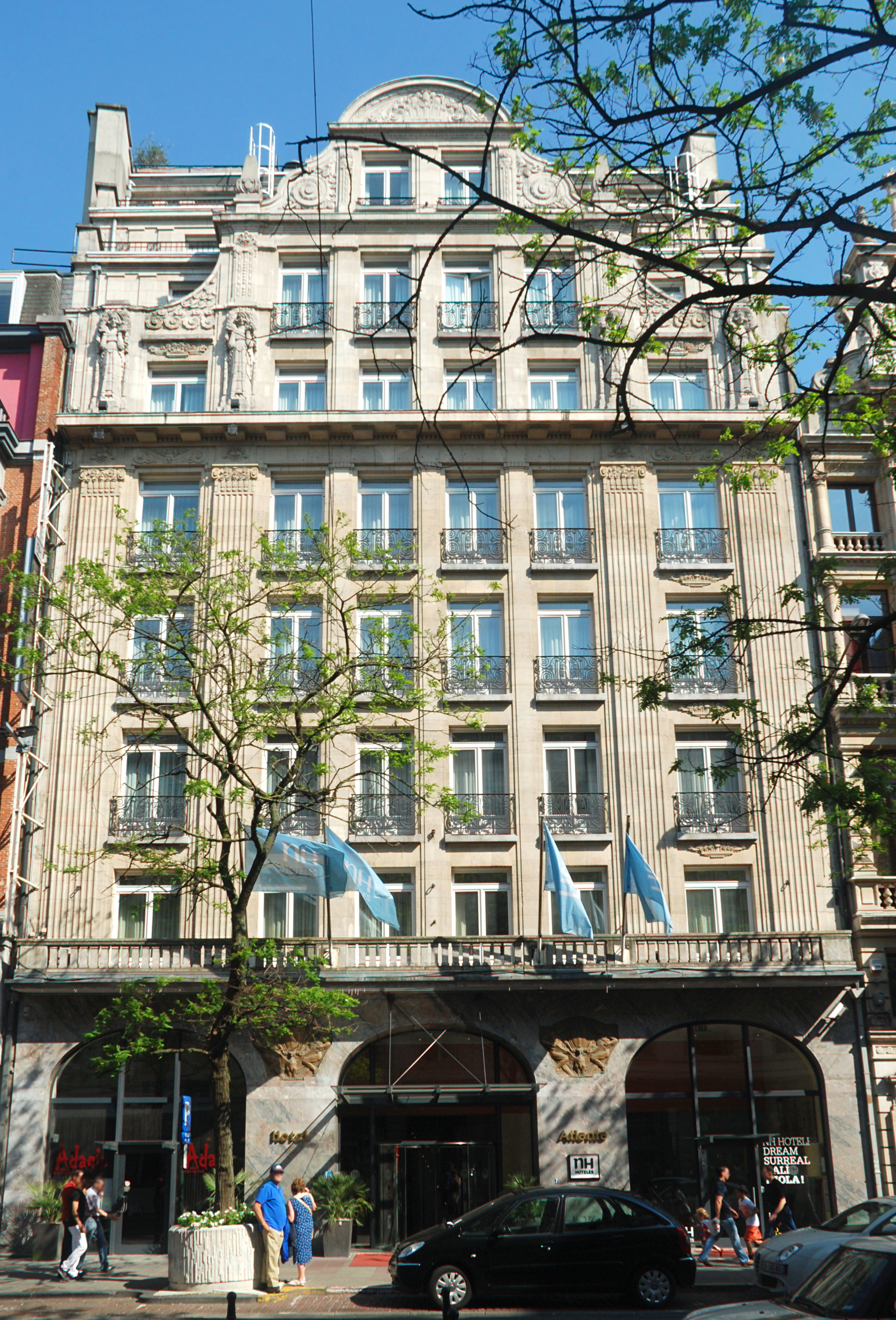
Hotel Atlanta (Polak, 1925–1929)

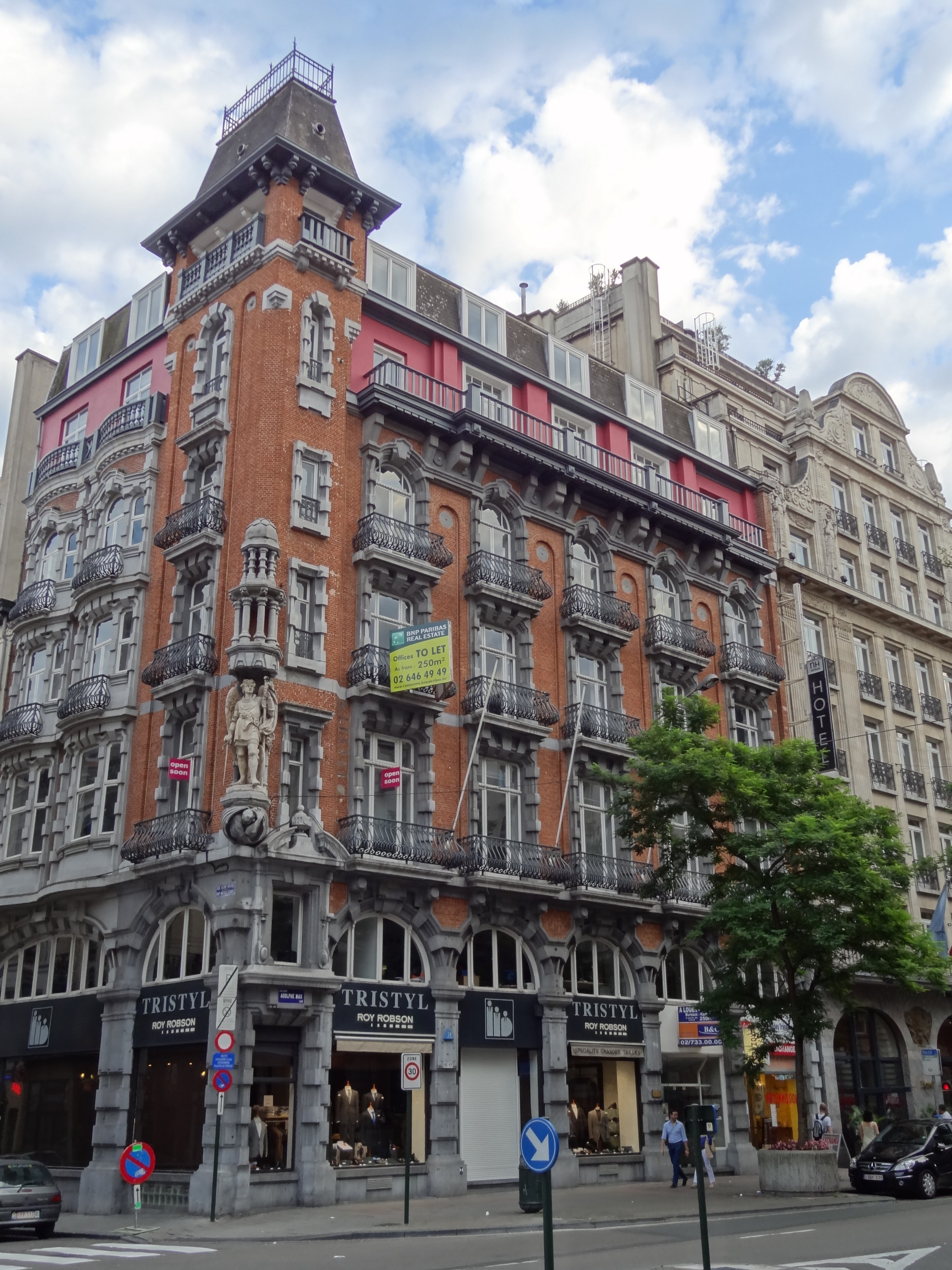
Thonet House (Laureys, 1872)

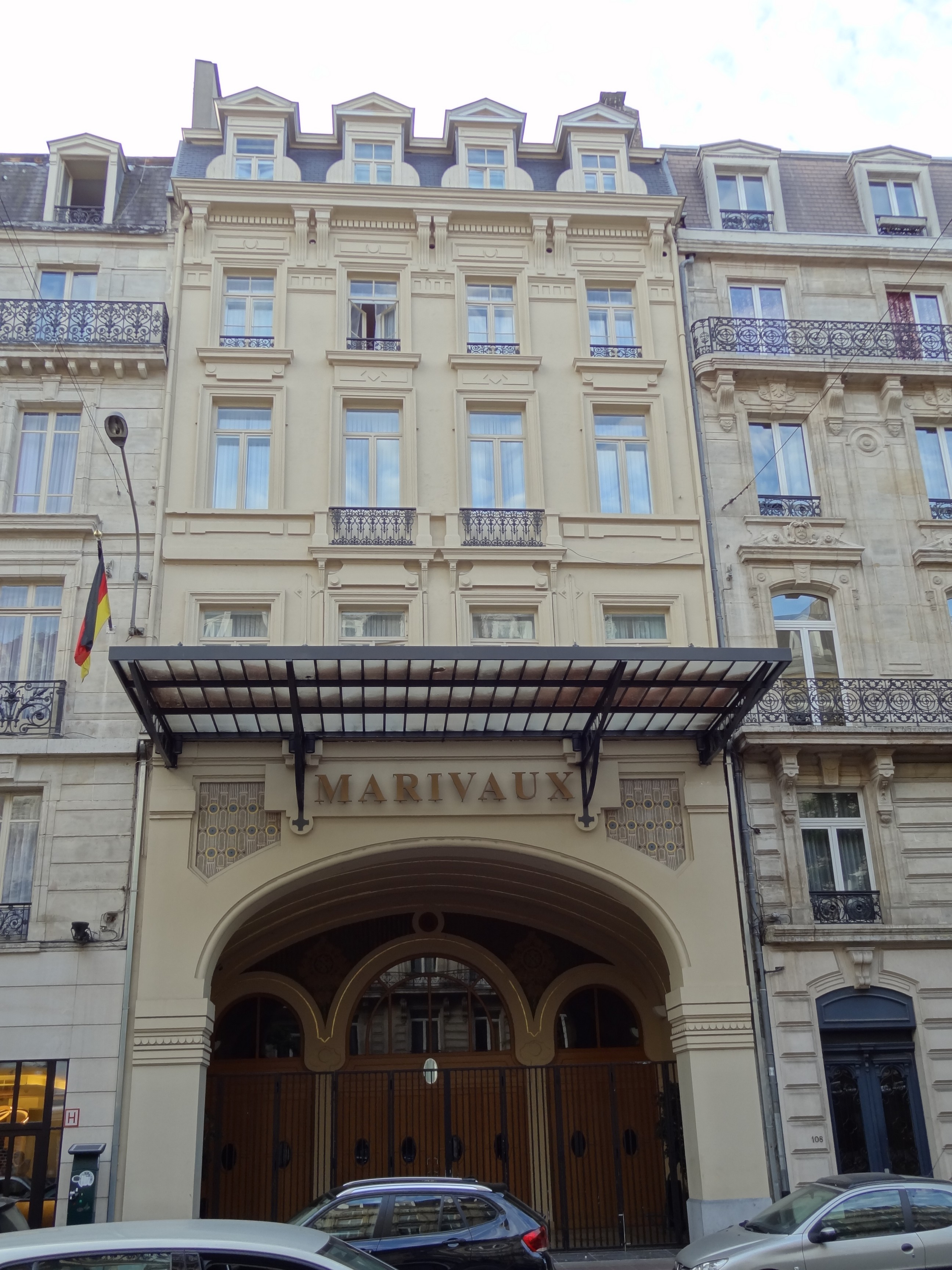
Marivaux theatre (Marinus, 1873 and Hubrecht, 1923)

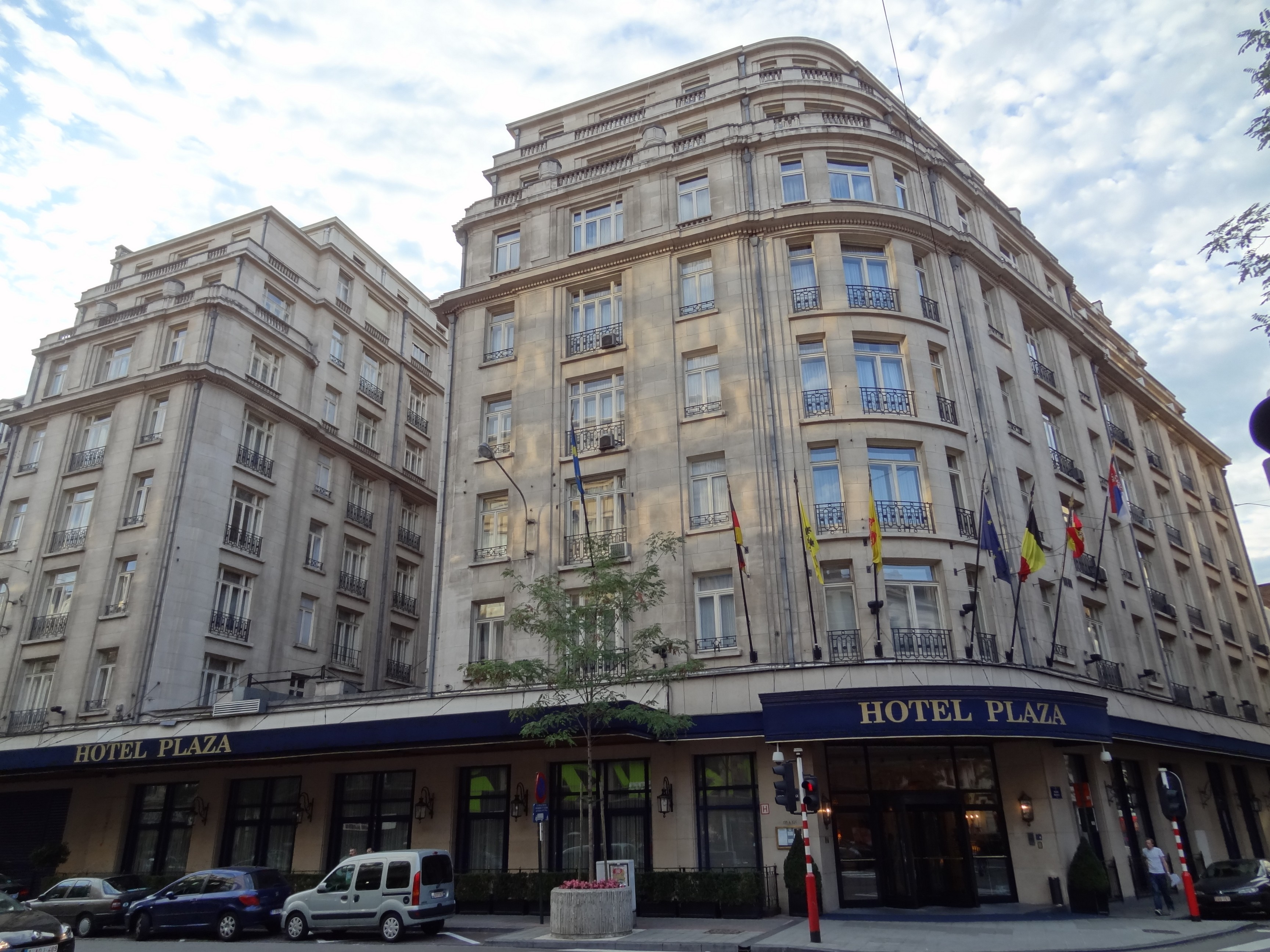
Hotel le Plaza (Hoch and Polak, 1928)

== See also ==
- List of streets in Brussels
- Neoclassical architecture in Belgium
- Art Nouveau in Brussels
- Art Deco in Brussels
- History of Brussels
- Belgium in the long nineteenth century
