= Port Clinton High School =

Location
- 821 South Jefferson Street; Port Clinton, Ohio 43452; United States
- 41°30′13″N 82°56′15″W

Information
- Type: Public high school
- Motto: Charting A Course For Success
- School district: Port Clinton City School District
- Superintendent: Pat Adkins
- Principal: Gary Steyer
- Vice principal: Adam Hicks
- Grades: 9–12
- Enrollment: 510 (as of 2024–2025)
- Colors: Red and White
- Athletics conference: Northern Ohio Conference
- Mascot: Redskins
- Affiliation: Northern Ohio Conference
- Website: hs.pccsd.net

Port Clinton High School is a public high school in Port Clinton, Ohio. It is the only high school in the Port Clinton City School District. Their nickname is the Redskins. They are currently members of the Northern Ohio Conference.

As of the 2014–15 school year, the school had an enrollment of 550 students. There were 210 students (38.2% of enrollment) eligible for free lunch and 47 (8.5% of students) eligible for reduced-cost lunch.

== Athletics ==
Port Clinton's athletics represent the Sandusky Bay Conference for all sports.

Fall sports:

- boys and girls cross country,
- girls volleyball,
- boys and girls golf,
- boys and girls soccer,
- football,
- girls tennis,
- non-competition cheerleading.

Winter sports:

- boys and girls basketball,
- boys and girls swimming,
- boys and girls bowling,
- wrestling,
- non-competitive cheerleading.

Spring sports:

- boys baseball,
- girls softball,
- boys and girls track,
- boys tennis.

== Marching Band ==
"The Pride of the Redskins" is the nickname to the marching band. Each performance contains a choreographed dance during the final song. Common artists include Lady Gaga, Guns N' Roses, Bon Jovi, and many others. They have had the honor of hosting the Ohio State University Marching Band and performing at Ohio State's Skull Session on November 3, 2011. Every four years, they also perform at Disney World in Florida around Christmas, and Chicago. In 2015, the band marched the Florida Citrus Parade, as well as a parade in Disney's Epcot. In 2018, the band played in Chicago's Saint Patrick's Day Parade, where they were first in the lineup. The band will be returning to Florida in December 2019.

== Notable alumni ==
- Doug Cooper (born 1970), writer of literary fiction.
- Sue Myrick (born 1941), former U.S. Representative for North Carolina's 9th congressional district, serving from 1995 to 2013.

== See also ==
- Native American mascot controversy
- Sports teams named Redskins
