= Dragon of Shandon =

Nighttime parade in Ireland

- The eponymous dragon during the 2023 parade
- Genre: Festival
- Frequency: Annually
- Location: Cork
- Country: Ireland
- Inaugurated: October 31, 2006; 20 years ago
- Founder: Cork Community Art Link
- Next event: 31 October 2026
- Website: www.dragonofshandon.com

The Dragon of Shandon is a nighttime parade held annually at Halloween (31 October) in Cork, Ireland. It begins shortly after dark to facilitate child spectators and participants, and proceeds from Shandon to the city centre. The parade celebrates the Gaelic festival of Samhain and also has participants from immigrant communities with similar traditions such as Dia de Los Muertos. The parade features musicians, dancers, costumed groups, and giant puppets, culminating with the eponymous dragon, a skeleton which breathes smoke. The parade is organised by Cork Community Art Link (CCAL), which coordinates participation by various community and arts groups from Shandon and surrounding neighbourhoods.

The first Dragon of Shandon parade was held in 2006. The original dragon was made of cardboard, whereas the current one is made of tape. In 2019, CCAL contributed to a Louisiana Voodoo/jazz funeral parade which opened the Cork Jazz Festival the week before the Dragon of Shandon parade. The parade receives some funding from Cork City Council but mainly relies on voluntary donations and labour. In 2018 and 2022, there were fears of a funding shortfall, partly from the cost of storing the increasing collection of floats and costumes between parades; some were on display in Blackpool Shopping Centre and Cork Airport in the buildup. The parade returned in 2022 after being cancelled in 2020 and 2021 owing to the COVID-19 pandemic.
