= Parade =

Procession, esp. celebratory, of people

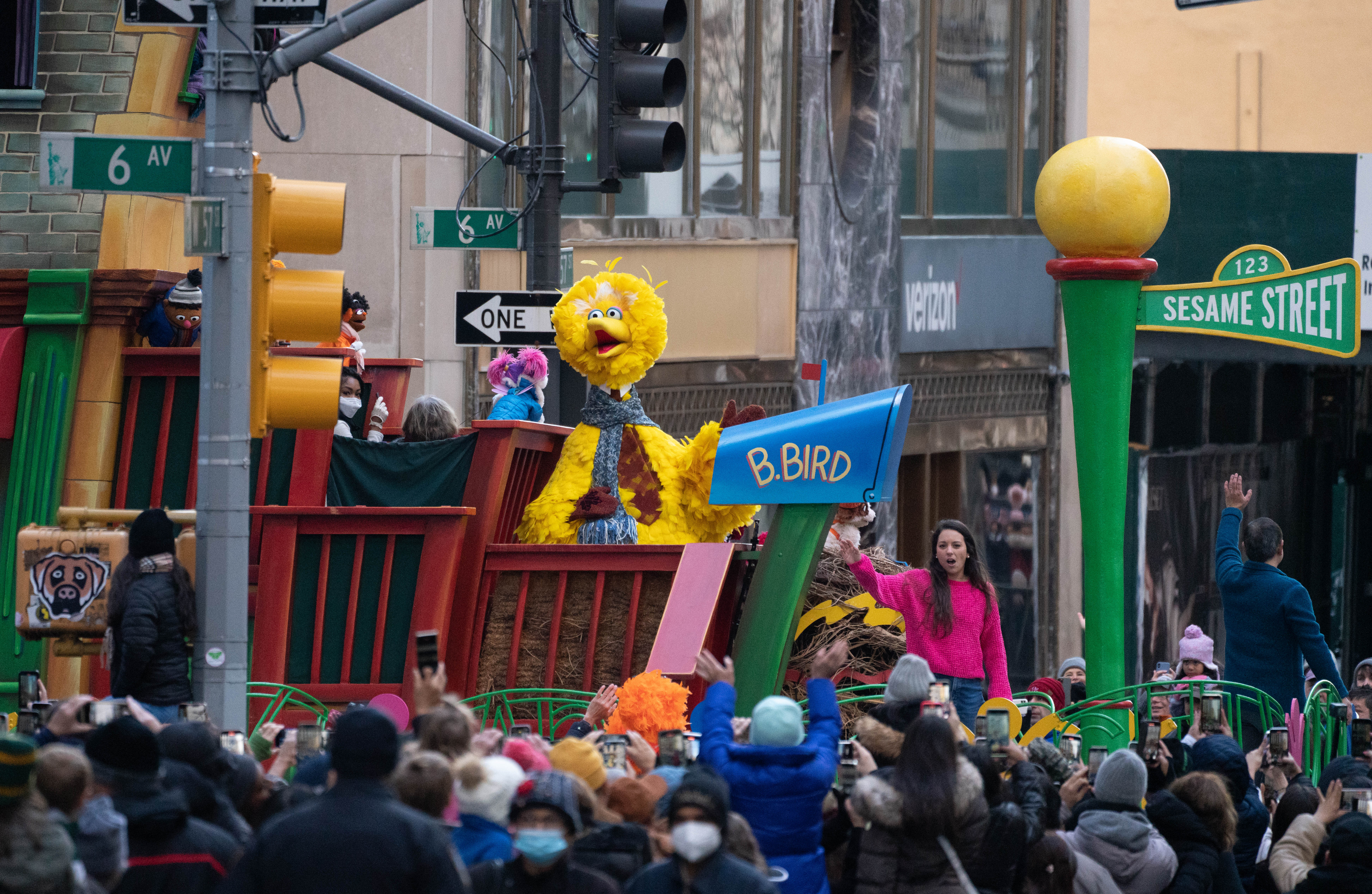
The Macy's Thanksgiving Day Parade in Manhattan is the world's largest parade.

A parade is a procession of people, usually organized along a street, often in costume, and often accompanied by marching bands, floats, or sometimes large balloons. Parades are held for a wide range of reasons, but are usually some variety of celebration.

The term "parade" is also used in different contexts; for example, in the Canadian Armed Forces, "parade" is used both to describe the procession and in other informal connotations.

Protest demonstrations can also take the form of a parade, but these are usually referred to as a march instead.

== History ==
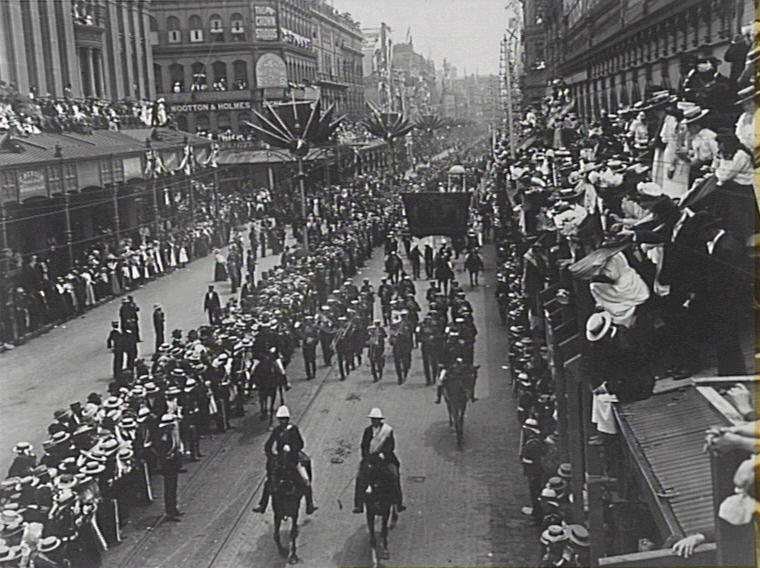
A parade in Sydney to celebrate the Federation of Australia in January 1901

The first parades date back to c. 2000 BC, for religious or military purposes. The Babylonians celebrated Akitu by parading their deities and performing rituals.

The oldest in the world is the Lord Mayor's Show which takes place in London the day after a new mayor is inaugurated and which was established in 1215.

To celebrate the federal government's victory in the American Civil War, 145,000 Union soldiers marched in a two-day Grand Review of the Armies in Washington, D.C. They passed before the President, the Cabinet, and senior officers from May 23–24, 1865.

During the Allied liberation of Europe towards the end of WWII in 1944–45, "victory parades" were a common feature throughout the recently liberated territories. For example, on 3 September 1944, the personnel of the 2nd Canadian Infantry Division marched six abreast to the music of massed regimental pipe and drum bands through the streets of Dieppe, France, to commemorate the liberation of the city from German occupation, as well as commemorate the loss of over 900 soldiers from that formation during the Dieppe Raid two years earlier. On the Moscow Victory Parade of 1945 held in Moscow, Soviet Union in June 1945, the Red Army commemorated Victory in Europe with a parade and the ceremonial destruction of captured Wehrmacht and Waffen-SS standards.

== Parade float ==
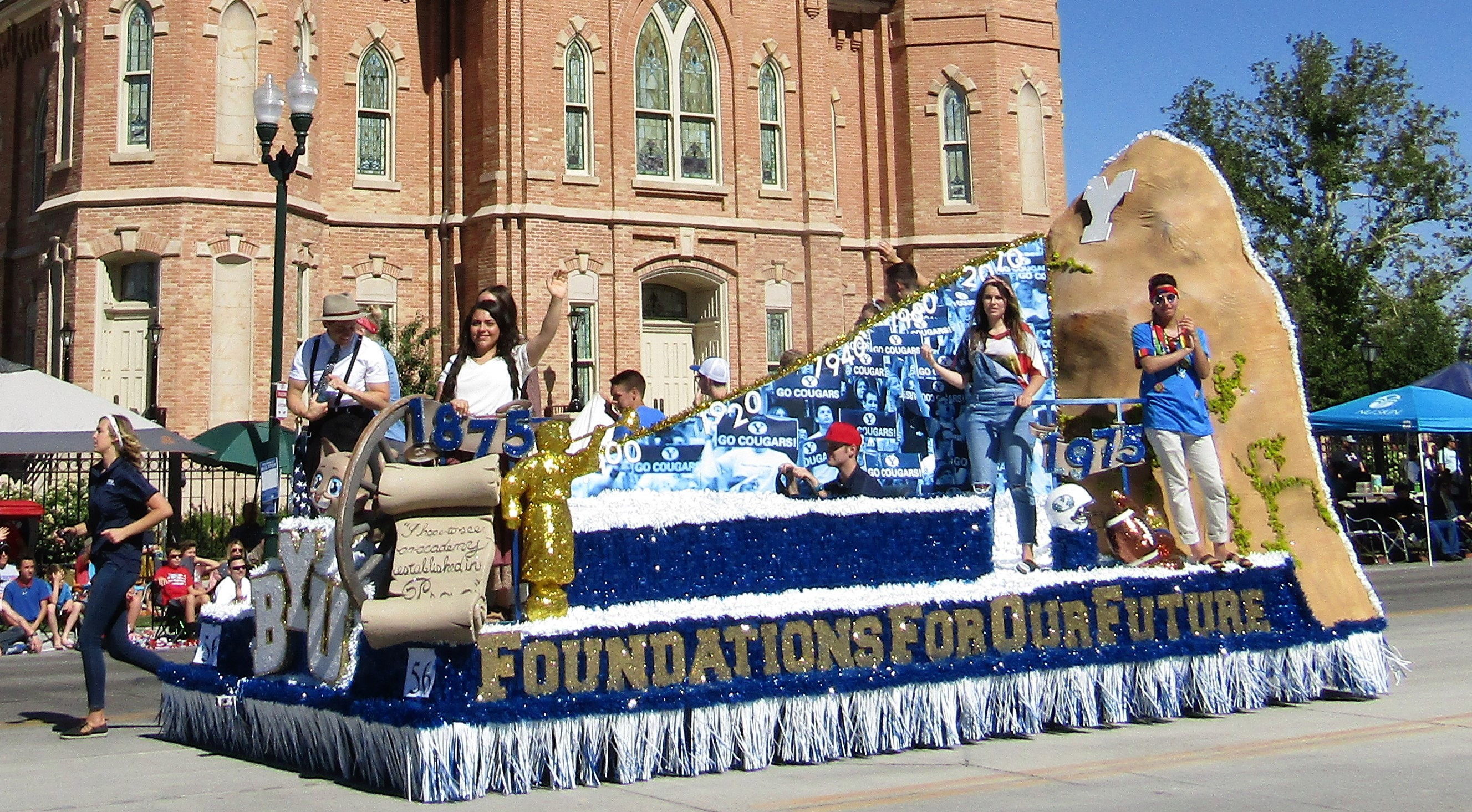
A parade float for Brigham Young University in the Freedom Festival Grand Parade in Provo, Utah

The name parade float has sometimes been attributed to the first floats, which were decorated barges that were towed along the canals with ropes held by parade marchers on the shore. Floats were occasionally propelled from within by concealed oarsmen, but the practice was abandoned because of the high incidence of drowning when the lightweight and unstable frames capsized. Strikingly, among the first uses of grounded floats—towed by horses—was a ceremony in memory of recently drowned parade oarsmen. Today, parade floats are traditionally pulled by motor vehicles or are powered themselves.

== Parade grand marshals ==
Multiple grand marshals may often be designated for an iteration of the parade, and may or may not be in actual attendance due to circumstances (including death). A community grand marshal or other designations may be selected alongside a grand marshal to lead the front or other parts of the parade.

== Aircraft and boats ==
Since the advent of such technology, it became possible for aircraft and boats to parade. A flypast is an aerial parade of anything from one to dozens of aircraft, both in commercial context at airshows and also to mark important dates, such as national days or significant anniversaries. They are particularly common in the United Kingdom, where they are often associated with Royal occasions. Similarly, for ships, there may be a sail-past of, e.g., tall ships (as was seen during Trafalgar 200) or other sailing vessels as during the celebrations of the 60th anniversary of World War II.

== Longest parade ==
The longest parade in the world is the Hanover Schützenfest that takes place in Hanover every year during the Schützenfest. The parade is 12 kilometres (7.5 miles) long with more than 12,000 participants from all over the world, among them more than 100 bands and around 70 floats and carriages.

The flower parade in the Netherlands is 42 km and runs over 13 hours from Noordwijk to Haarlem.

== Types of parades ==
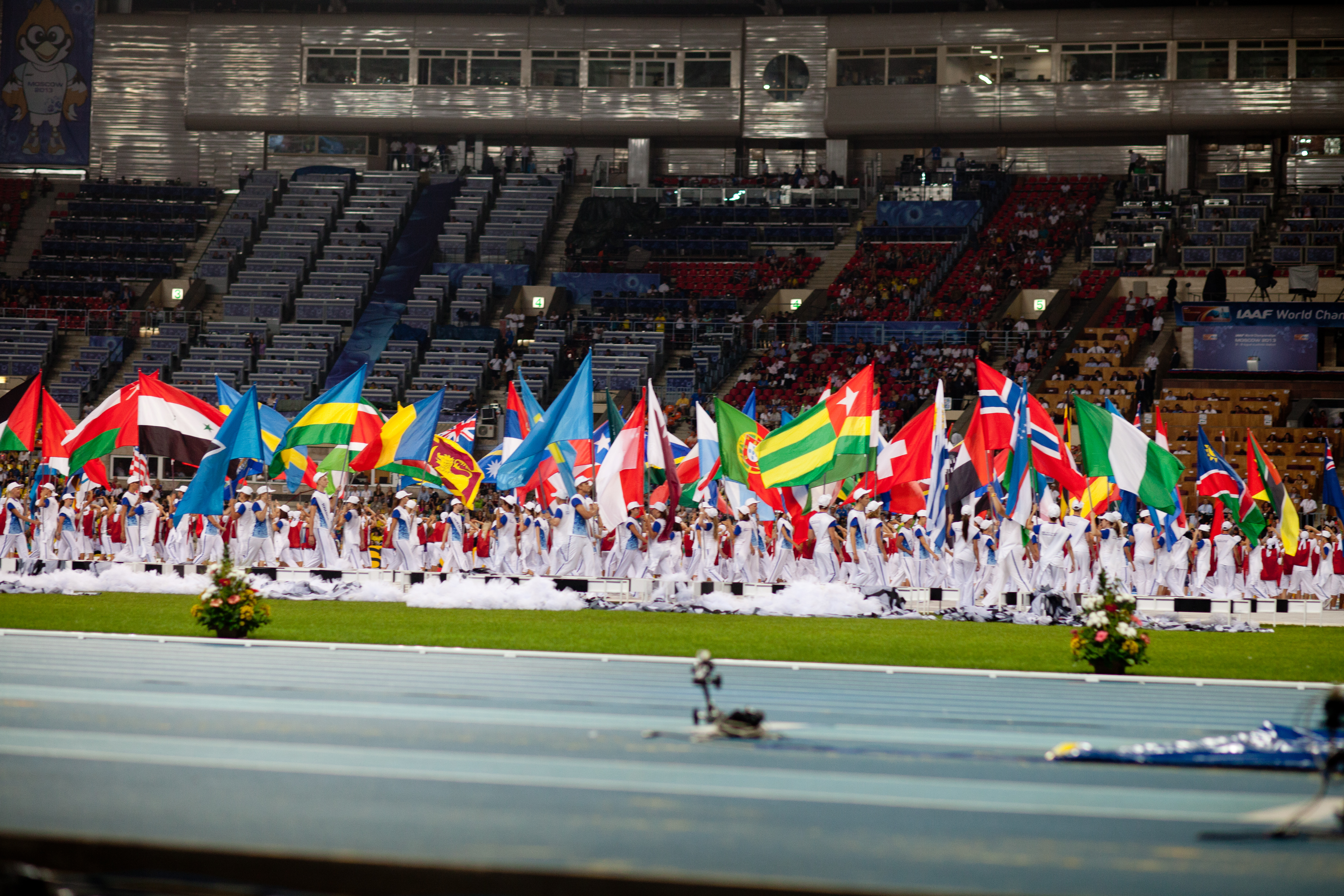
2013 World Championships in Athletics Parade of Nations at the Luzhniki Stadium in Moscow, Russia

- Boat Parade (Winterfest)
- Carnival parade
- Cavalcade
- Circus
- Electrical Parade
- Flypast
- Flower parade
- Halloween parade
- Military parade
- Motorcade
- Parade of horribles
- Parade of Nations
- Pride parade
- Santa Claus parade
- Technoparade
- Ticker-tape parade
- Victory parade
- Walking day

== Examples of annual event parades ==
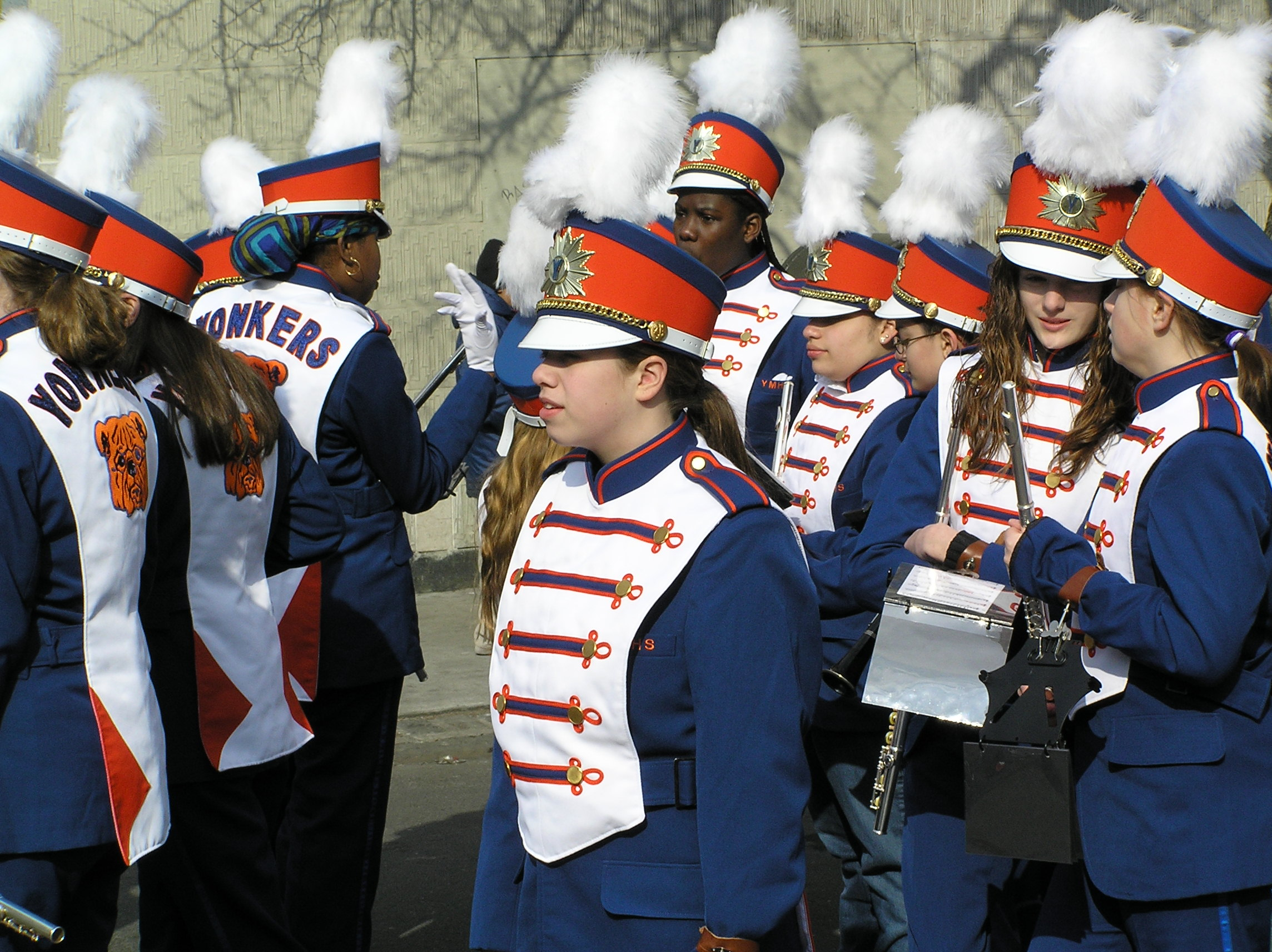
Yonkers High School, New York students preparing for the Yonkers St. Patrick's Day Parade

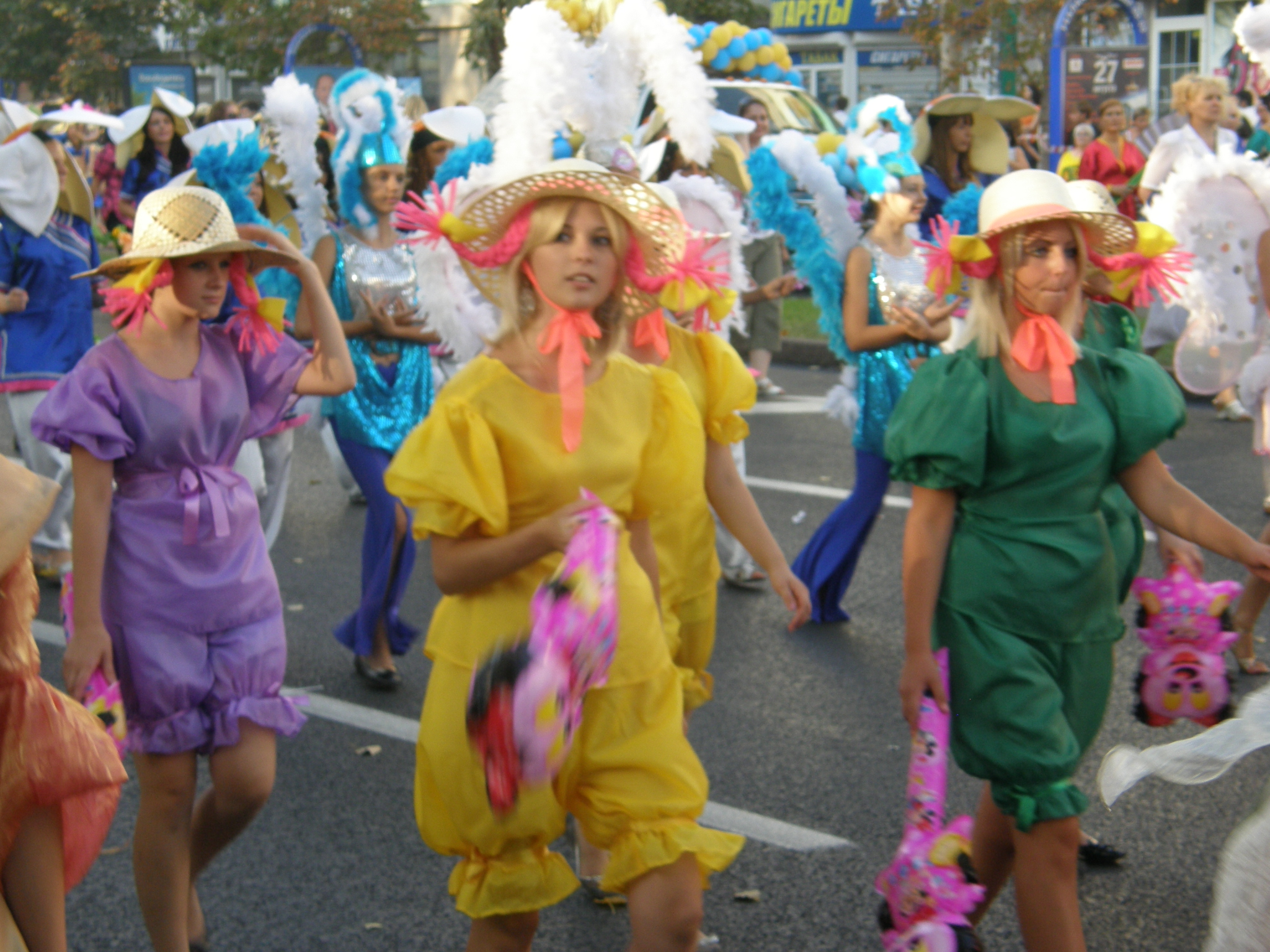
A Carnival parade in Donetsk, Ukraine

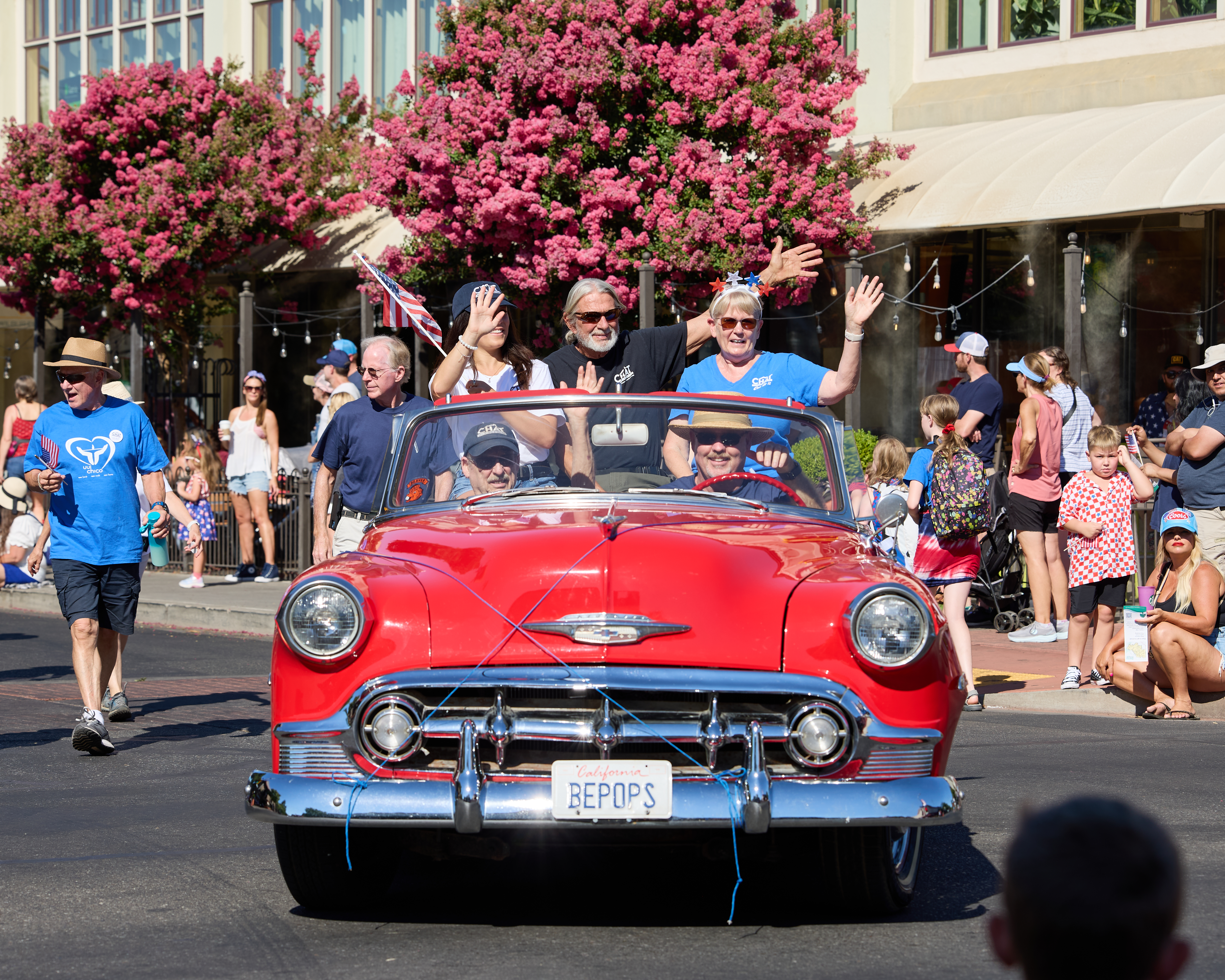
4th of July Parade in Chico, California, 2024

- Anheuser-Busch Washington's Birthday Parade, held annually in Laredo, Texas
- Bastille Day Military Parade—Held annually in Paris, France, in celebration of the Bastille Day
- Bud Billiken Parade and Picnic—Second largest annual parade in the United States, held on the second Saturday in August in Chicago, Illinois.
- Calgary Stampede Parade
- Carnaval San Francisco
- Carnival in the Netherlands
- Dahlia parade in Zundert always held on the first Sunday in September
- Days of '47 Parade in Salt Lake City
- Disney Parks Christmas Day Parade
- Dragon of Shandon Samhain parade in Cork, held annually on the 31st of October at night
- Easter parade
- Gasparilla Pirate Festival in Tampa is the third largest parade in the US and commemorates a pirate sack of the city.
- Independence Day parade in Yerevan, Armenia
- International Bank of Commerce "Under the Stars" youth parade, held annually in Laredo, Texas
- Independence Day Parade parade in Kyiv, Ukraine.
- London's New Year's Day Parade
- Macy's Thanksgiving Day Parade
- Mardi Gras
- Main Street Electrical Parade
- Marksmen's Parade, Hannover
- May Day Parade
- McDonald's Thanksgiving Parade, Chicago, Illinois
- Independence Day Parade parade in Minsk, Belarus.
- Mummers Parade
- National Memorial Day Parade
- New York's Village Halloween Parade
- Nickelodeon Celebration Parade
- Notting Hill Carnival
- Orange Bowl Parade
- Orange walk
- Orlando Citrus Parade
- Philippine Independence Day Parade
- Procession of the Species
- Republic Day Parade in India
- Pakistan Day Parade in Pakistan
- Rose Parade in United States
- Saint Patrick's Day Parade Dublin, Munich, New York City, Boston, Holyoke, Quebec City and San Diego
- San Francisco Chinese New Year Festival and Parade
- Singapore National Day Parade
- Torchlight Parade, Seattle, Washington
- Toronto Santa Claus Parade
- Tournament of Roses Parade
- Trooping the Colour
- Independence Day Parade in Ashgabat, Turkmenistan
- Victory Day Parade, held annually in the Russian Federation, formerly held in Ukraine, and celebrated in post-soviet nations.
- Vikingland Band Festival Parade Marching Championship
- West Country Carnival
- Zinneke Parade

== Observances marked by parades ==
- Anzac Day
- Armed Forces Day
- Canada Day
- Caribana
- Carnival
- Chinese New Year
- Christmas
- Easter
- Independence Day
- International Firefighters' Day
- Labor Day
- Mardi Gras
- Memorial Day
- Navy Day
- New Year's Day
- Olympic Games (Summer, Winter, Summer Youth, Winter Youth, and all Olympic-style sporting events and a few world championships), usually in the form of the Parade of Nations, where the teams or the flags of the participating teams enter one by one in alphabetical order of the host country
- Police Day
- Pioneer Day (Utah) – Days of '47 Parade
- Puerto Rican Day Parade
- Remembrance Sunday
- Republic Day
- Samhain
- Schützenfest
- Solstice
- St. Patrick's Day
- Thanksgiving
- Vaisakhi
- Victory Day
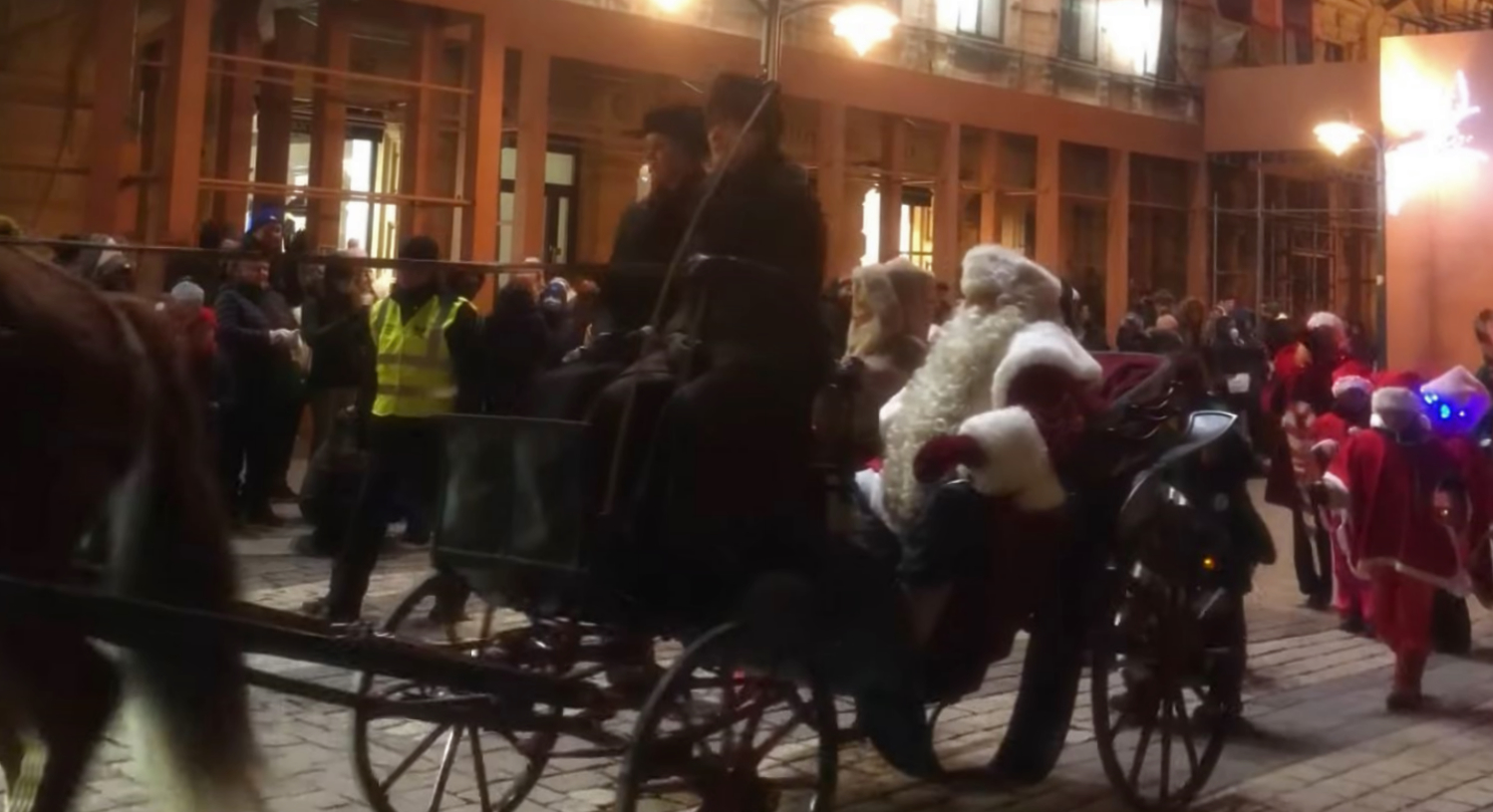
Santa Claus at the 2021 Christmas Parade in Helsinki, Finland

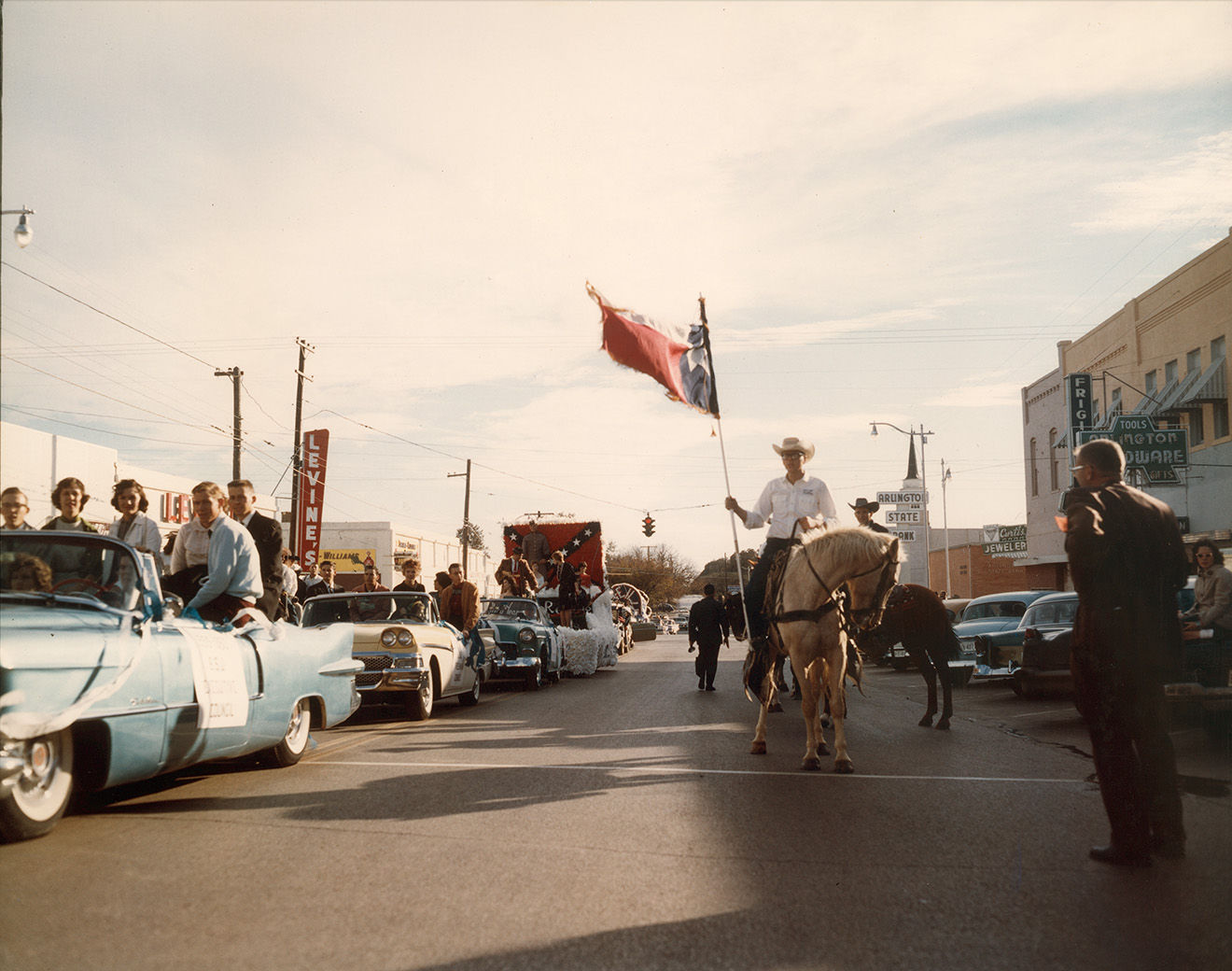
A homecoming parade for Arlington State College alumni in the 1950s or early 1960s

== See also ==
- Lord Mayor's Show
- Procession
