= Doug Cooper (author) =

American writer of literary fiction (born 1970)

- Born: Douglas Allan Cooper; June 5, 1970 (age 56); Sandusky, Ohio, U.S.
- Education: Port Clinton High School; Miami University (BS); Saint Louis University (MA)
- Occupations: Writer, novelist
- Writing career
- Genre: Literary Fiction
- Notable work: Outside In
- Movement: Transgressive
- Website: bycooper.com

Doug Cooper (born June 5, 1970) is an American writer of literary fiction. His debut novel, Outside In, won the 2014 International Book Award for Literary Fiction, the 2014 USA Best Book Award for Literary Fiction, and a 2015 Bronze IPPY from the Independent Publisher Book Awards.

== Personal life ==
Cooper grew up in Port Clinton, Ohio, graduating from Port Clinton High School. He has a Bachelor of Science in Mathematics Education from Miami University and a Master of Arts in American Studies from Saint Louis University. He has also lived in Cleveland, St. Louis, Detroit, New York City, and Oslo, Norway.

== Work ==
Cooper is often asked if his work is autobiographical. In response to this, he has said, "I am definitely asked that a lot, but I did it intentionally. It's another way I am having fun with the writing. Most first novels are autobiographical or are written as memoirs. Although some of the events are similar to those in my life, everything that happens in Outside In is there for a reason and has many layers of meaning. I decided to put in some details from my own life and let people run with it. If they want to read it as my life story, that's up to them. I'm not saying a lot of things in the book never happened, but I'll never say which did and did not. (Laughs.) But that's what the whole book is about—the duality of all things. Much of what appears on the surface of "Outside In" is a mask concealing a much deeper and sometimes opposite meaning. Outside In is more about the beliefs and experiences the reader brings. One reader may perceive a quote as a kernel of wisdom and another view it as hackneyed. This is all done purposely and very much figures in to how the ending is interpreted."

Cooper has appeared at the West Hollywood Book Fair, appearing on a drug fiction panel with Jerry Stahl and Mark Haskell Smith, the Vegas Valley Book Festival, and the Books by the Banks in Cincinnati, Ohio. He does book signings and readings at stores and cafes and appears on podcasts and radio shows.

== Bibliography ==
- Outside In (2013)
- The Investment Club (2016)
- Focus Lost (2019)
- The Snail and the Butterfly (2023) A children's book written under the pen name Dougie Coop
