= Zinneke Parade =

Biennial parade in Brussels, Belgium

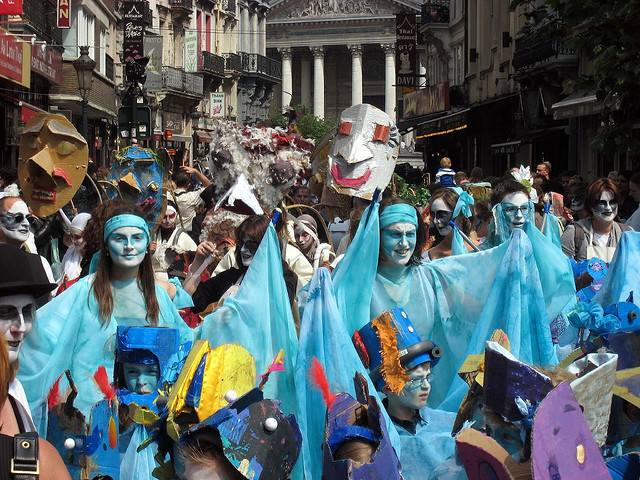
- The Zinneke Parade of Brussels
- Status: Active
- Frequency: Biennial
- Locations: City of Brussels, Brussels-Capital Region
- Country: Belgium
- Inaugurated: 27 May 2000
- Most recent: 30 May 2026
- Next event
- Participants: 2,500
- Website: www.zinneke.org

The Zinneke Parade is a biennial parade held in the City of Brussels, Belgium, since 2000. It is a cultural event organised by the Zinneke Association that brings together at each edition about 2,500 participants and attracts between 50,000 and 80,000 spectators. A different theme is chosen for each parade.

== Background ==
The Zinneke Parade was established with the aim of connecting the many different cultures, communities and districts within Brussels. The director of the Zinneke Association, Myriam Stoffen, has talked about the desire to "build bridges" between these parts of the city. Indeed, Zinneke is a nickname chosen to represent a person from Brussels who was not born there (the opposite of ketje for a native local). The word means "mutt" or "bastard" in the Brusselian dialect, and originally referred to the city's stray dogs that hung around the streets by the Lesser Senne (a tangent canal of the river Senne, which circumnavigated Brussels along the city walls) until the end of the 19th century (see covering of the Senne).

The organisers of the parade aim to work with a large variety of institutions, schools, cultural centres, organisations and societies. Residents work together with professional artists to create the ideas and prepare the projects that eventually make up the parade. Another characteristic of the parade that distinguishes it from many other parades or carnivals is that it is described as being "100% human" – music is performed live, without amplification, and there are no motorised vehicles.

== History ==
The Zinneke Parade was created for the first time as part of Brussels 2000, European Capital of Culture, with the aim of organising a multicultural carnival, a creative and participative event "likely to reconcile the Brussels population with its identity". The Zinneke Parade was watched by 60,000 spectators in 2006. In 2008, over 7,000 people were involved with the parade, under the theme "Eau / Water" ("Water"), with 2,500 of these appearing in the parade itself.

The 2010 theme was "A table / Aan tafel" ("Have a meal" or "Come to the Table!") and was held in May. In 2010, the parade was accompanied by a group of puppeteers from Belgium, Ireland, Italy and France, who performed in a number of balconies overlooking the route of the parade. The participants in the parade formed about 25 zinnodes, groups of around 100 people each, which started from four squares in the city—the Place Fontainas/Fontainasplein, the Place Sainte-Catherine/Sint-Katelijneplein, the Place de l'Albertine/Albertinaplein and the Place d'Espagne/Spanjeplein—then met along the way.

The 2012 Zinneke Parade took place on 19 May 2012, under the theme "Désordre / Wanorde" ("Disorder"). It was viewable from 22 locations around the centre of the City of Brussels, starting at 3 p.m. from the Grand-Place/Grote Markt (Brussels' main square). The 2016 edition, with the theme "Fragil" ("Fragile"), took place on 21 May 2016. The 2020 edition, with the theme "Wolven ! / Aux loups !" ("Wolves !"), was cancelled due to the COVID-19 pandemic in Belgium.

Themes by year
Year	Date	Theme	Ref
2000	27 May	La ville / De stad	
2002	25 May	Zinnergie	
2004	24 May	Le corps dans la ville / Het lichaam in de stad	
2006	13 May	Toekomst à venir	
2008	31 May	Eau / Water	
2010	22 May	A table / Aan tafel	
2012	19 May	Désordre / Wanorde	
2014	10 May	Tentation / Bekoring	
2016	21 May	Fragil	
2018	12 May	Illegal	
2020	Cancelled	Aux loups ! / Wolven !	
2022	14 May	Trompe l'oeil / Optische illusie	
2024	1 June	Plaizir	
2026	30 May	Rêve / Droom	

== Parade images ==
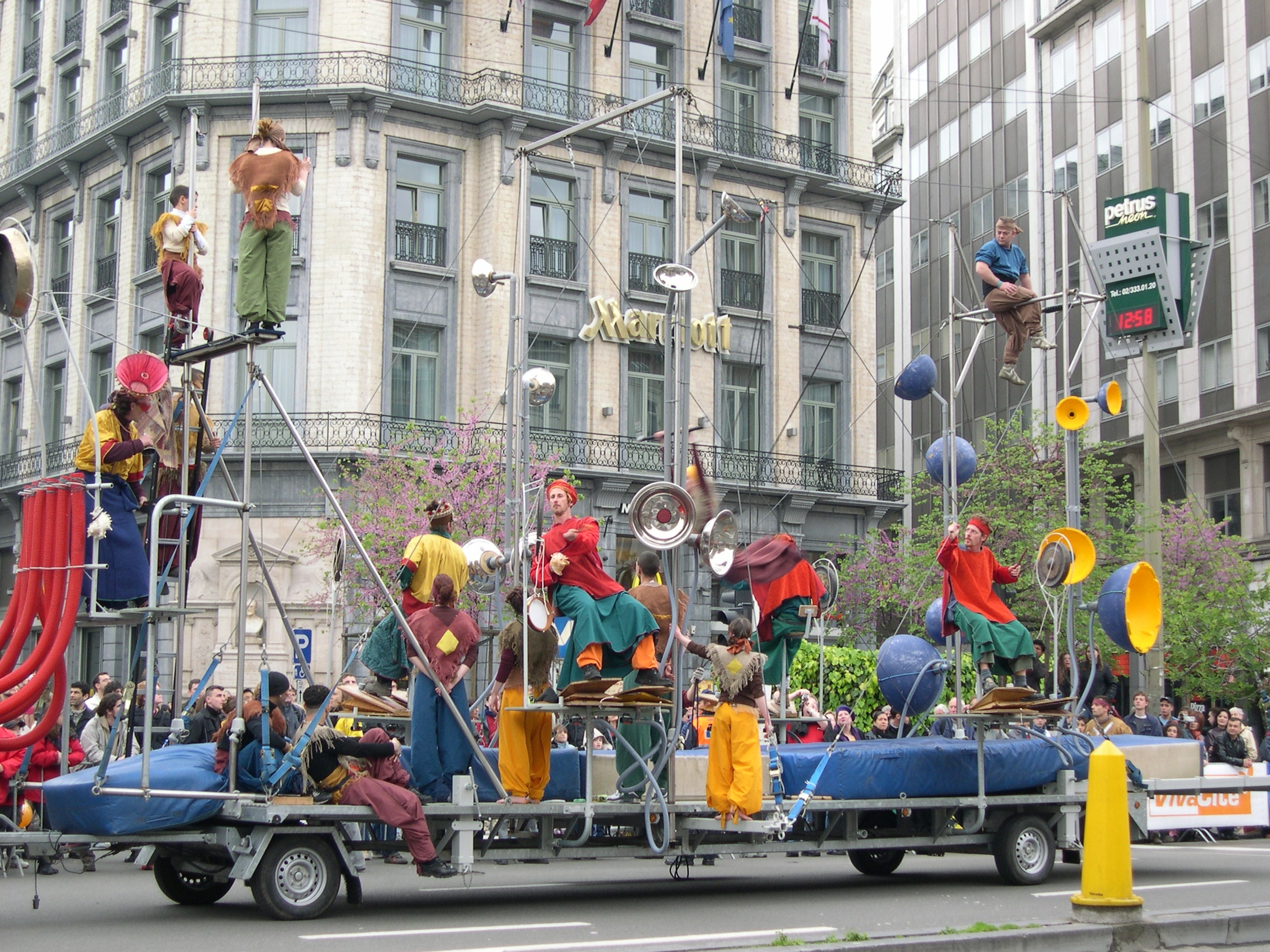
A parade float on the Place de la Bourse/Beursplein

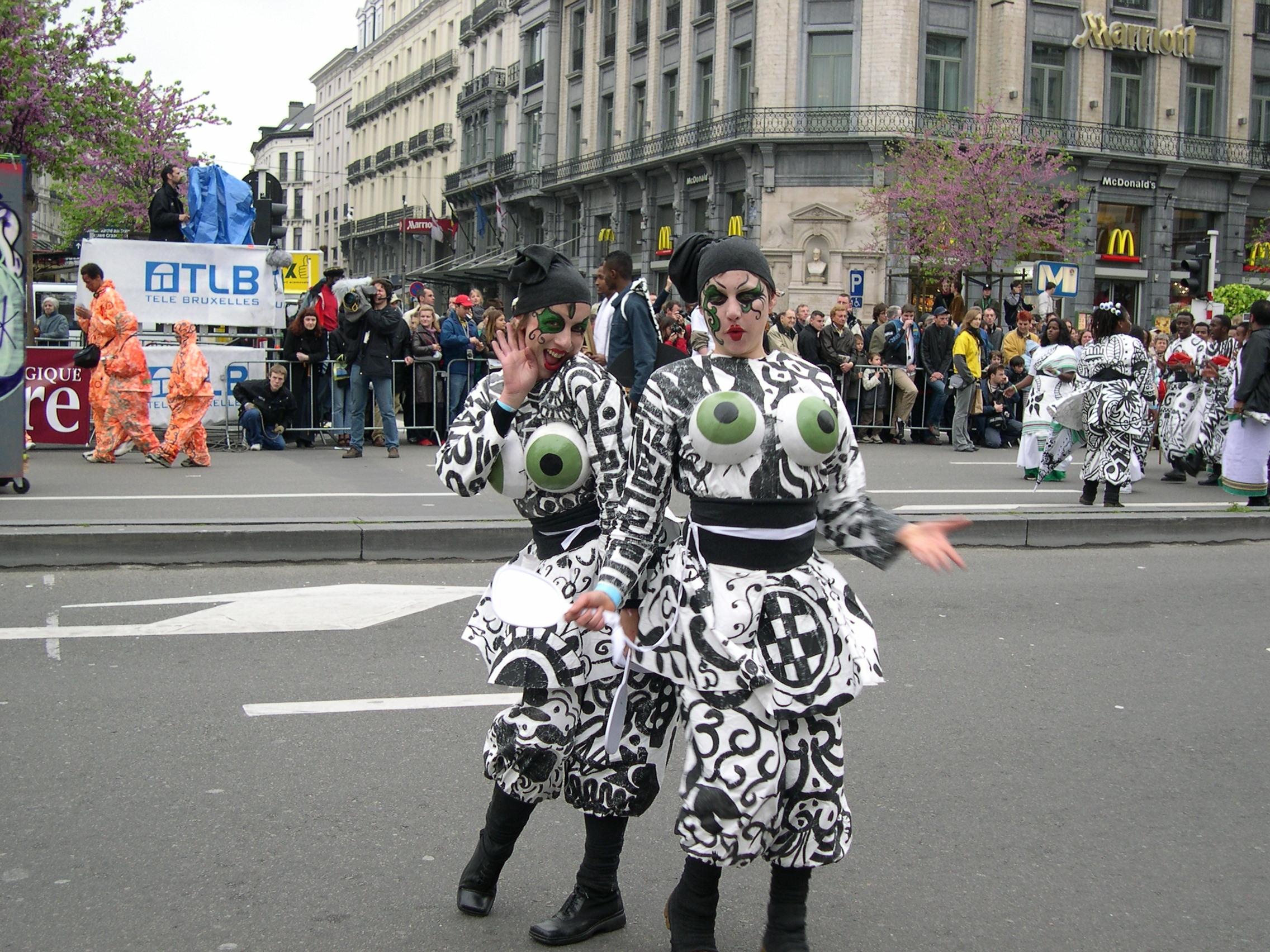
Two participants posing on the Place de la Bourse

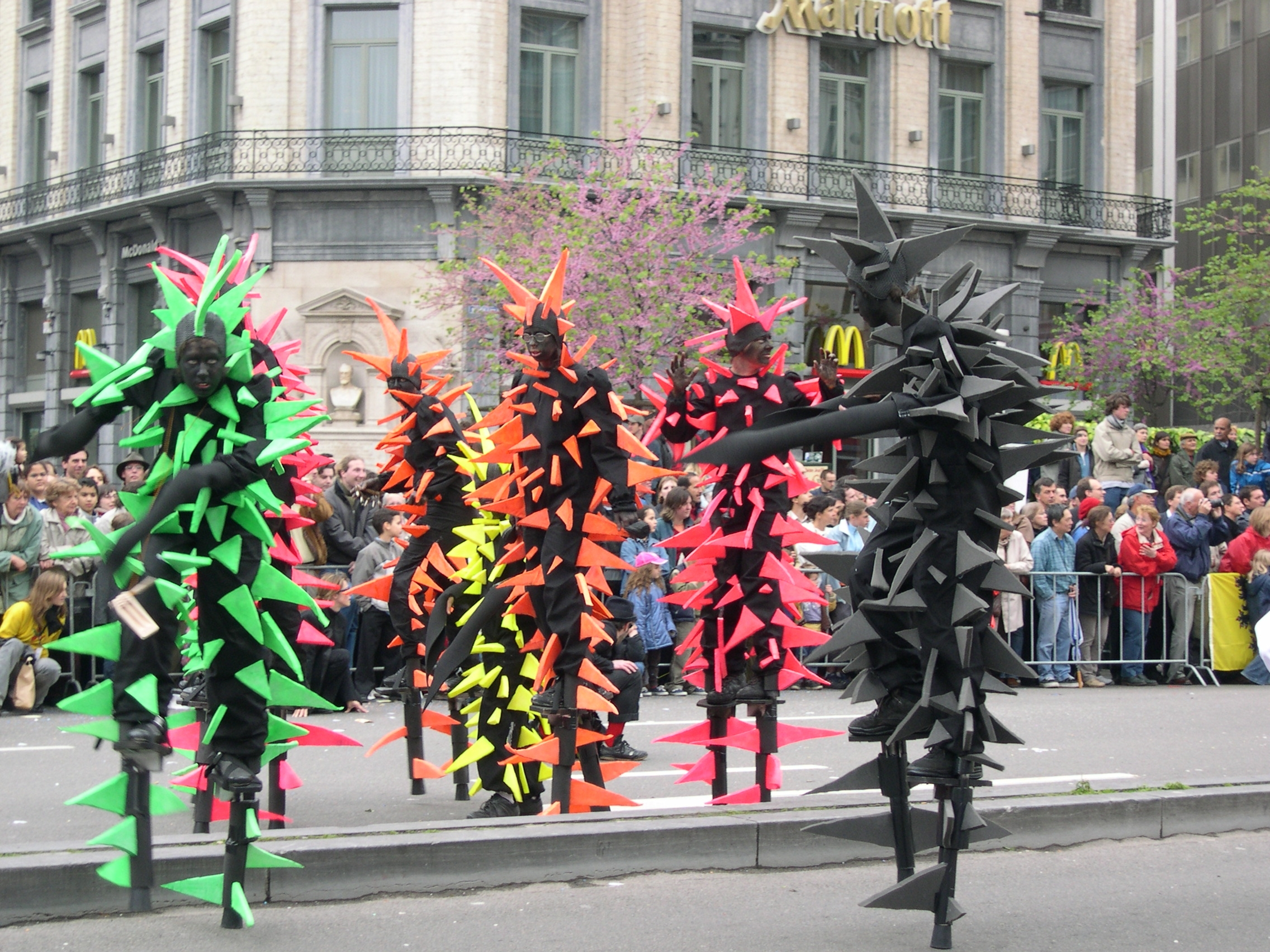
Brightly-coloured stilt walkers on the Place de la Bourse

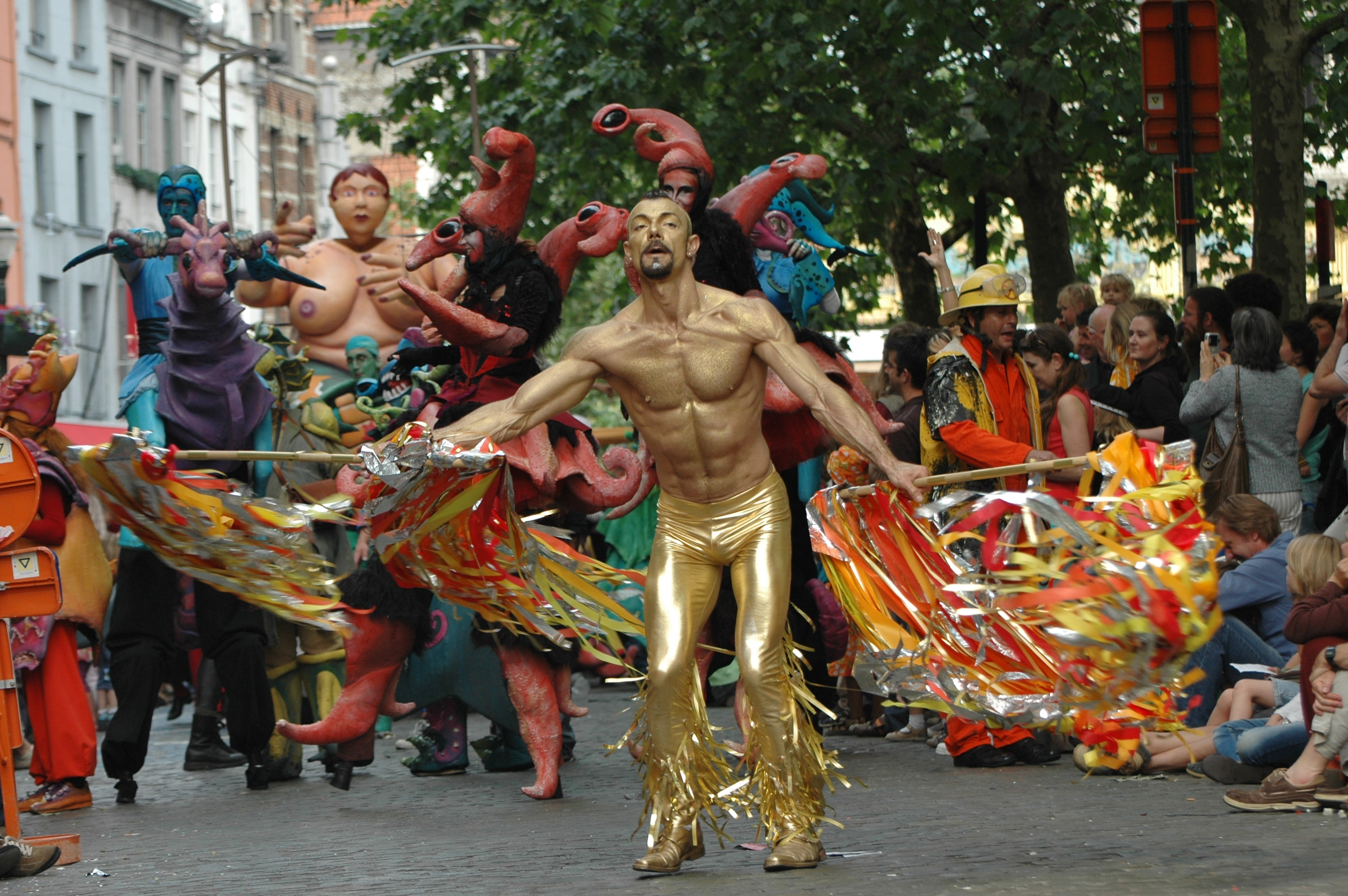
Carnival-style dancer and processional puppets parading through the streets of Brussels

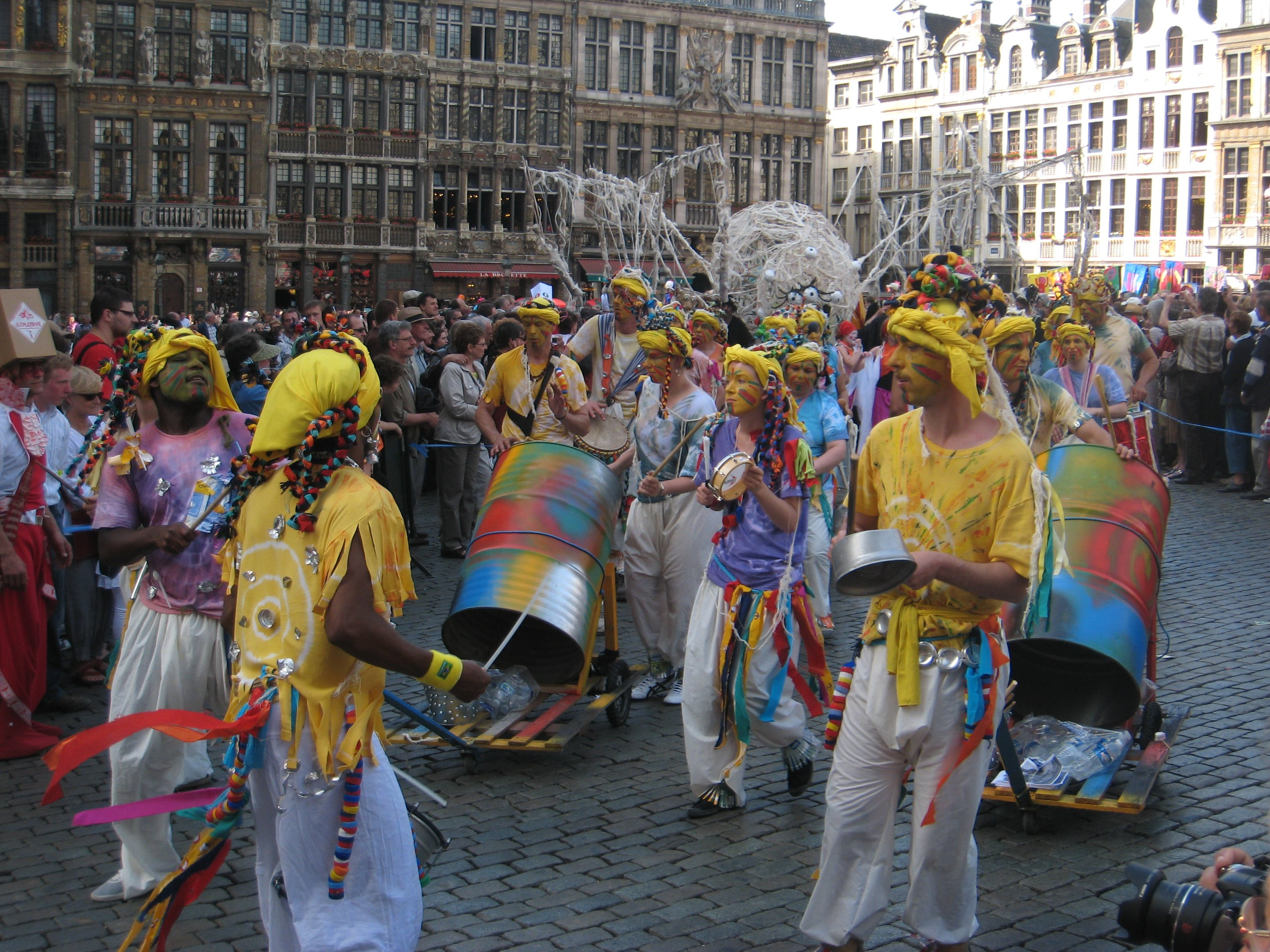
Colourfully-dressed musicians on the Grand-Place/Grote Markt

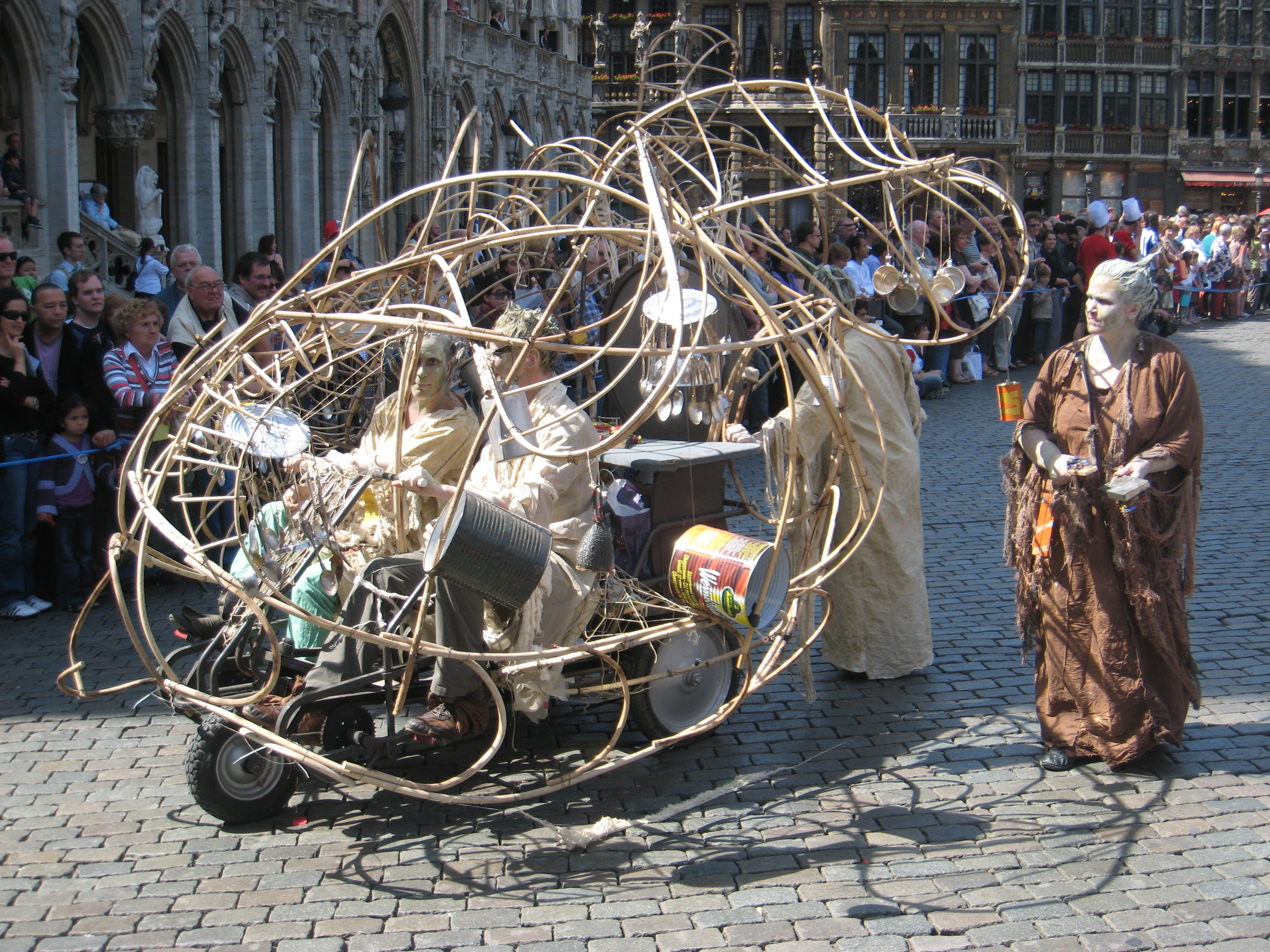
A human-powered vehicle on the Grand-Place

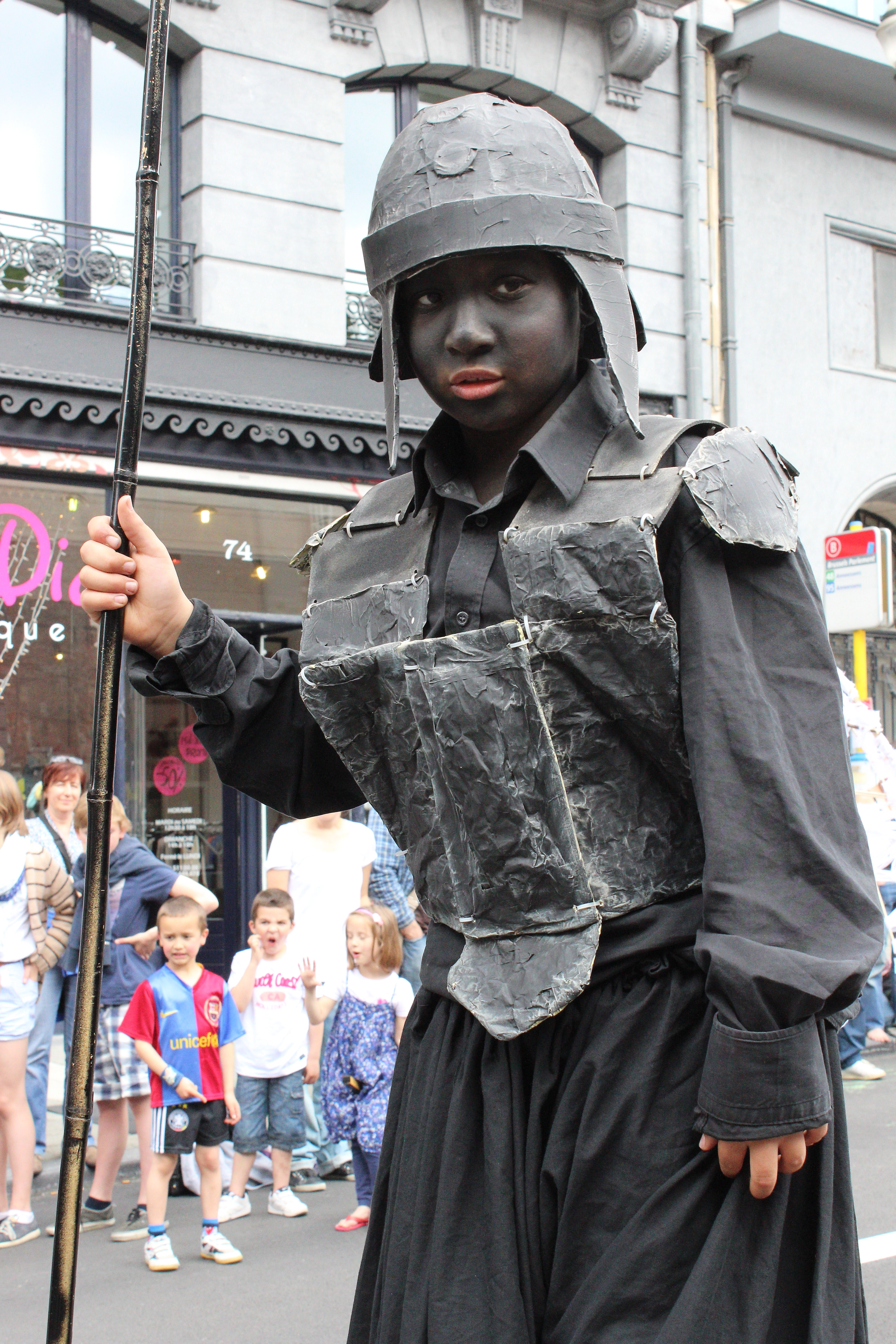
A young participant in costume

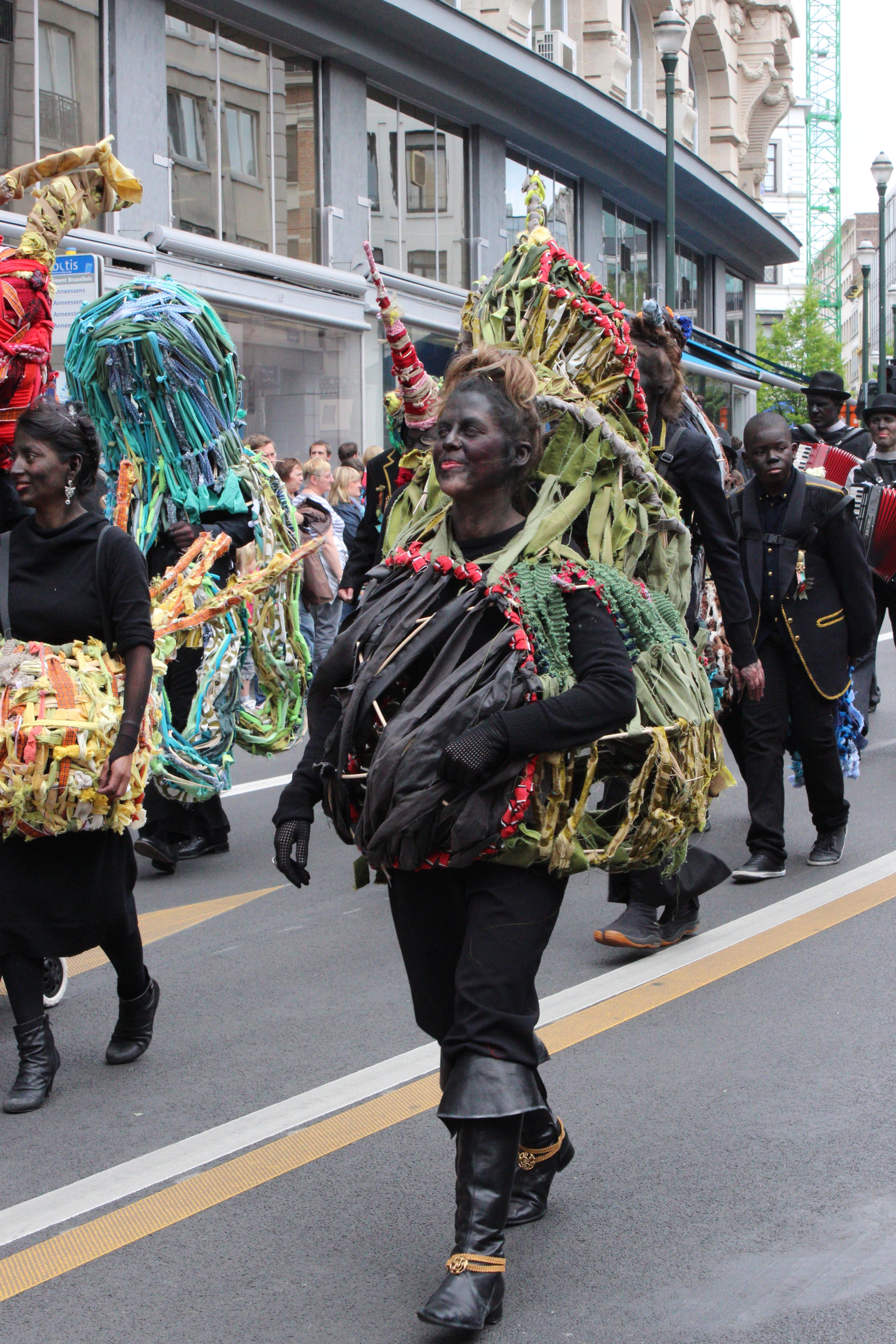
Participants with handcrafted accessories

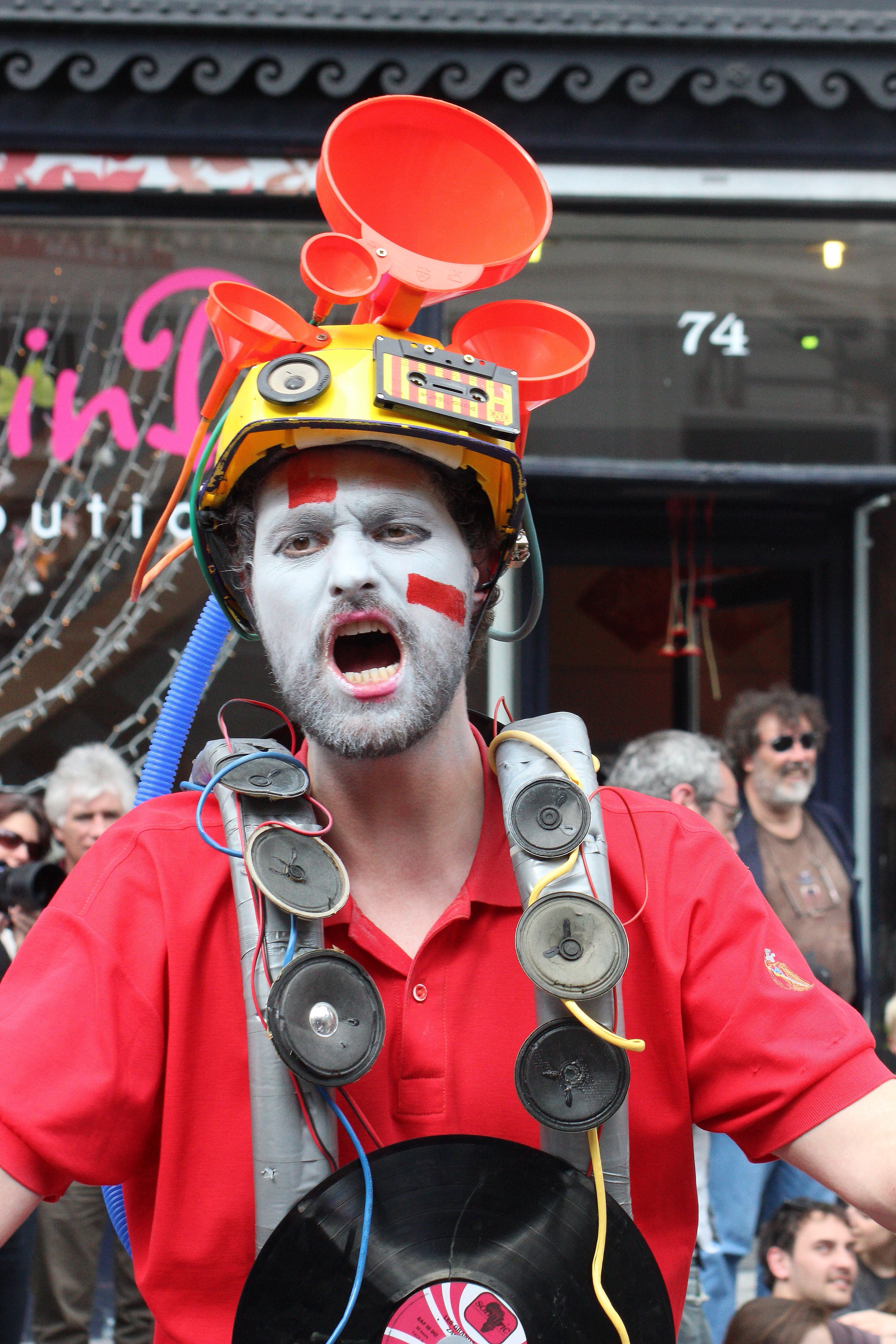
A participant with creative headgear

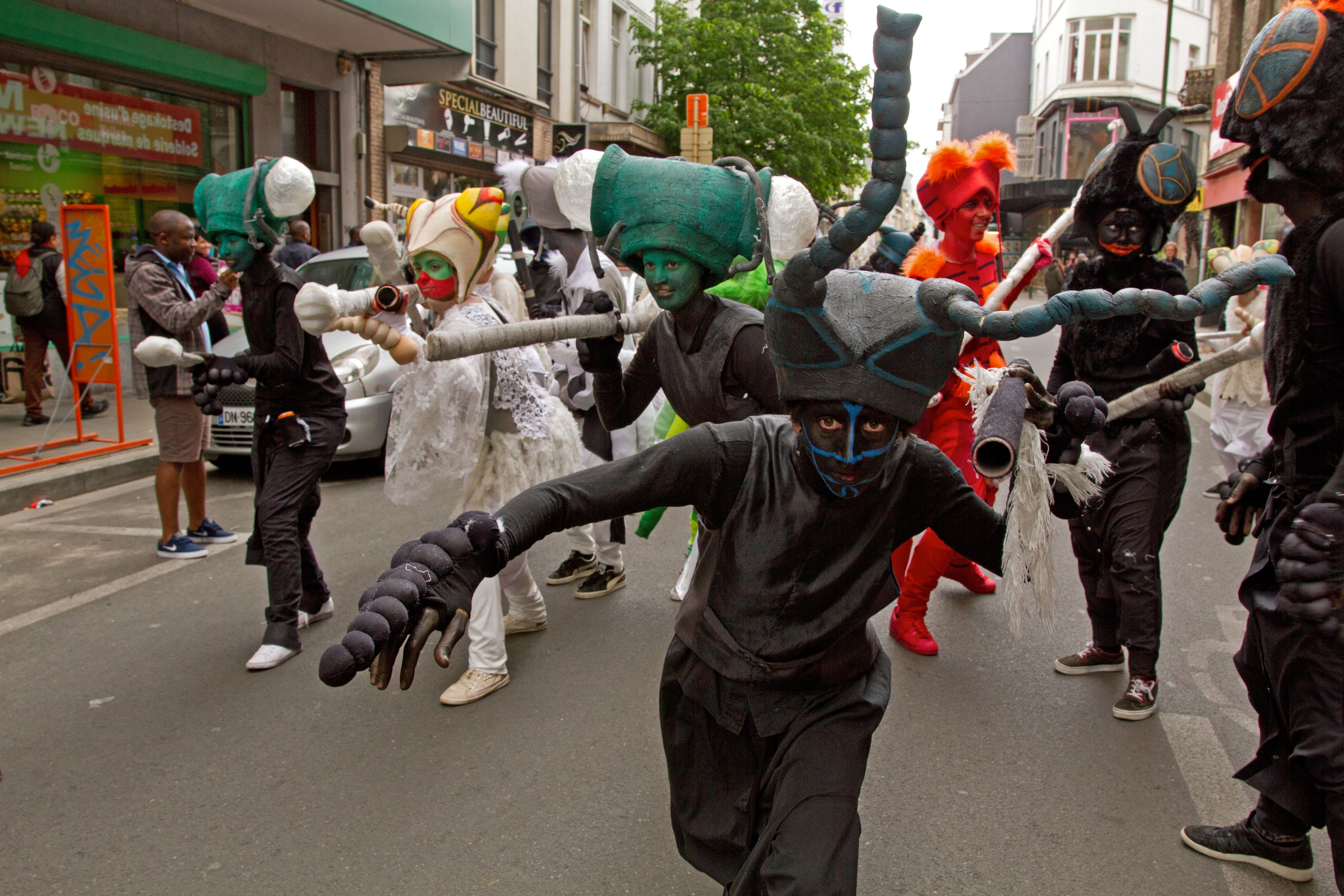
A group (or zinnode) in insect-inspired costumes

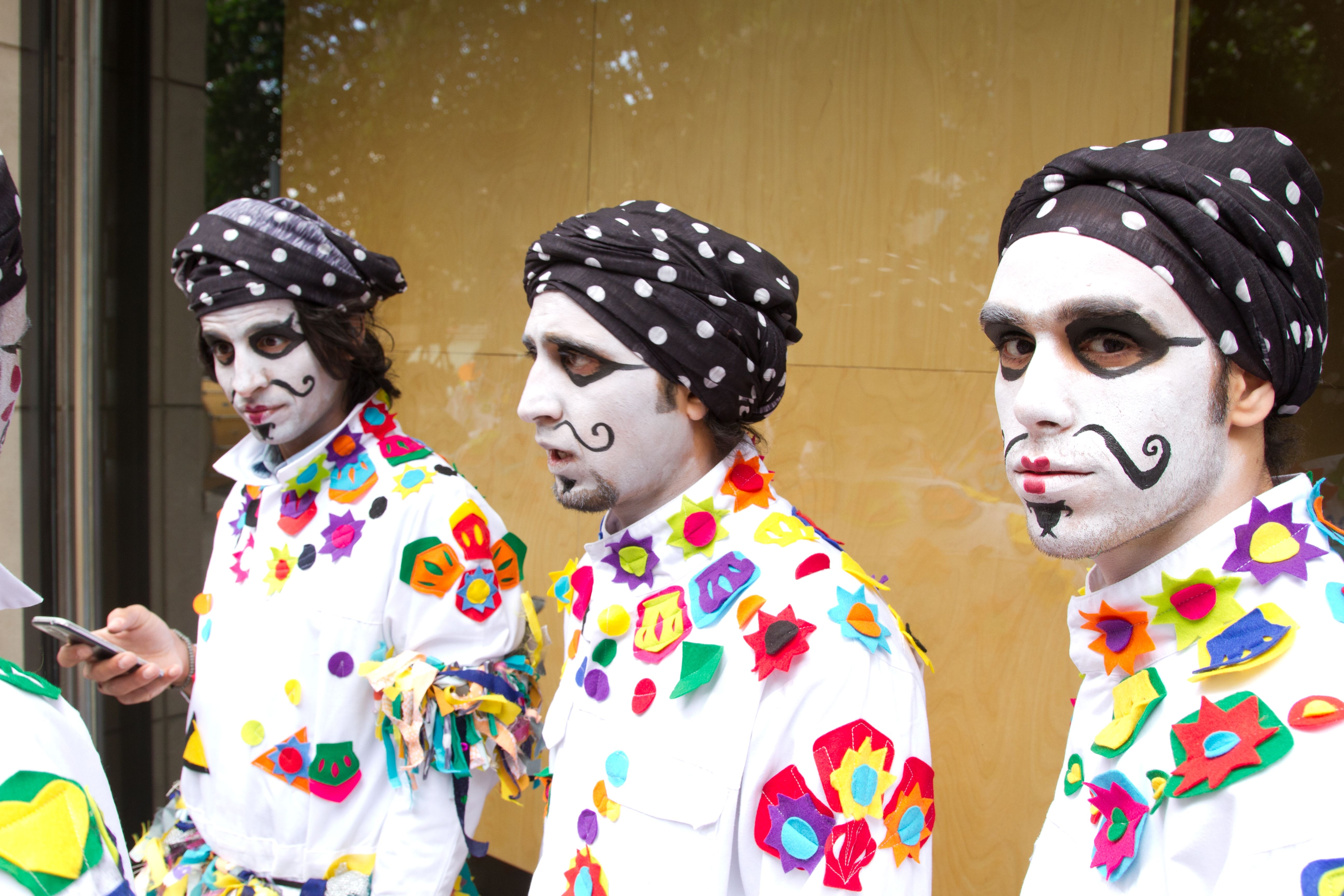
Colourfully-dressed mimes

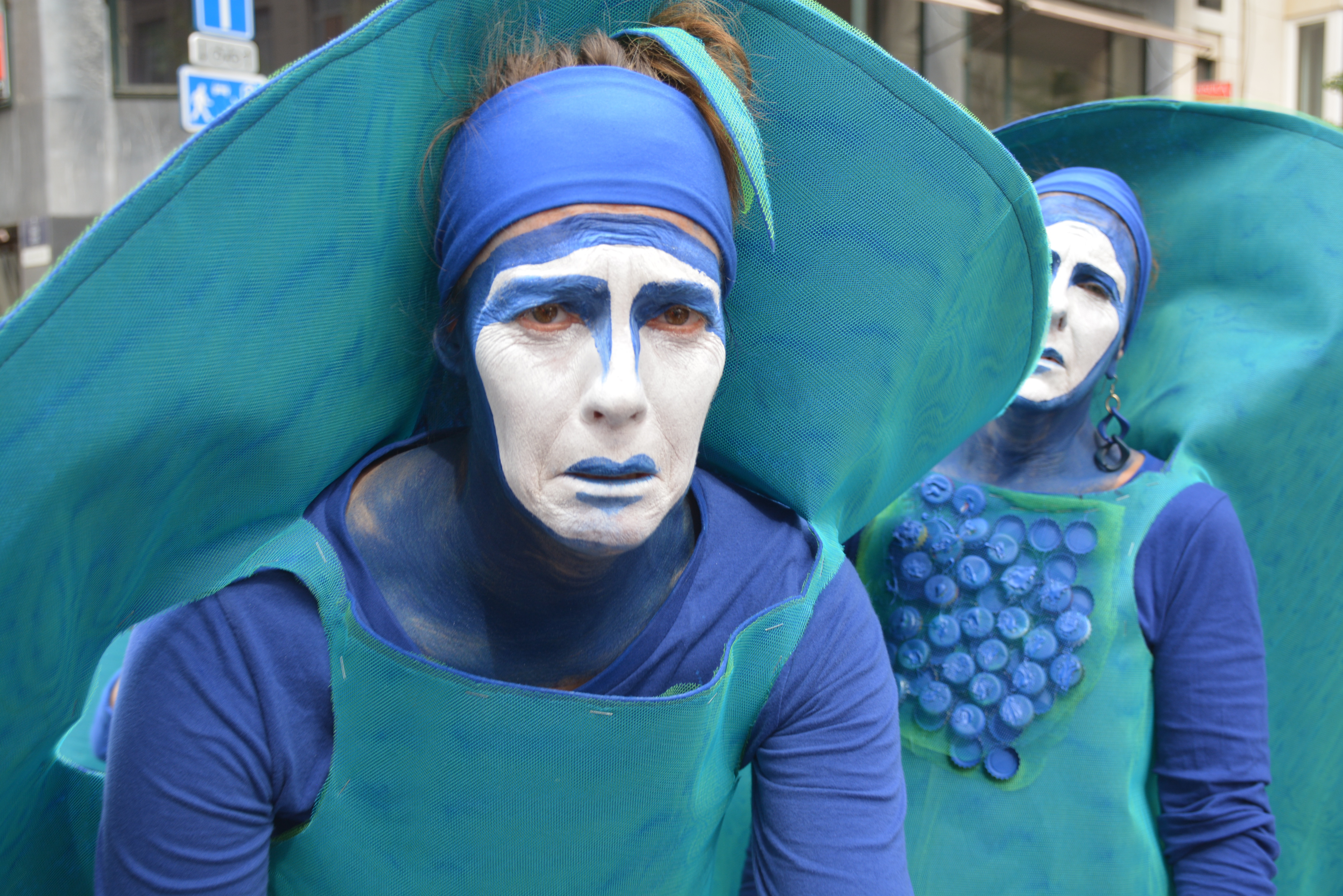
Two participants with blue costumes and face paint

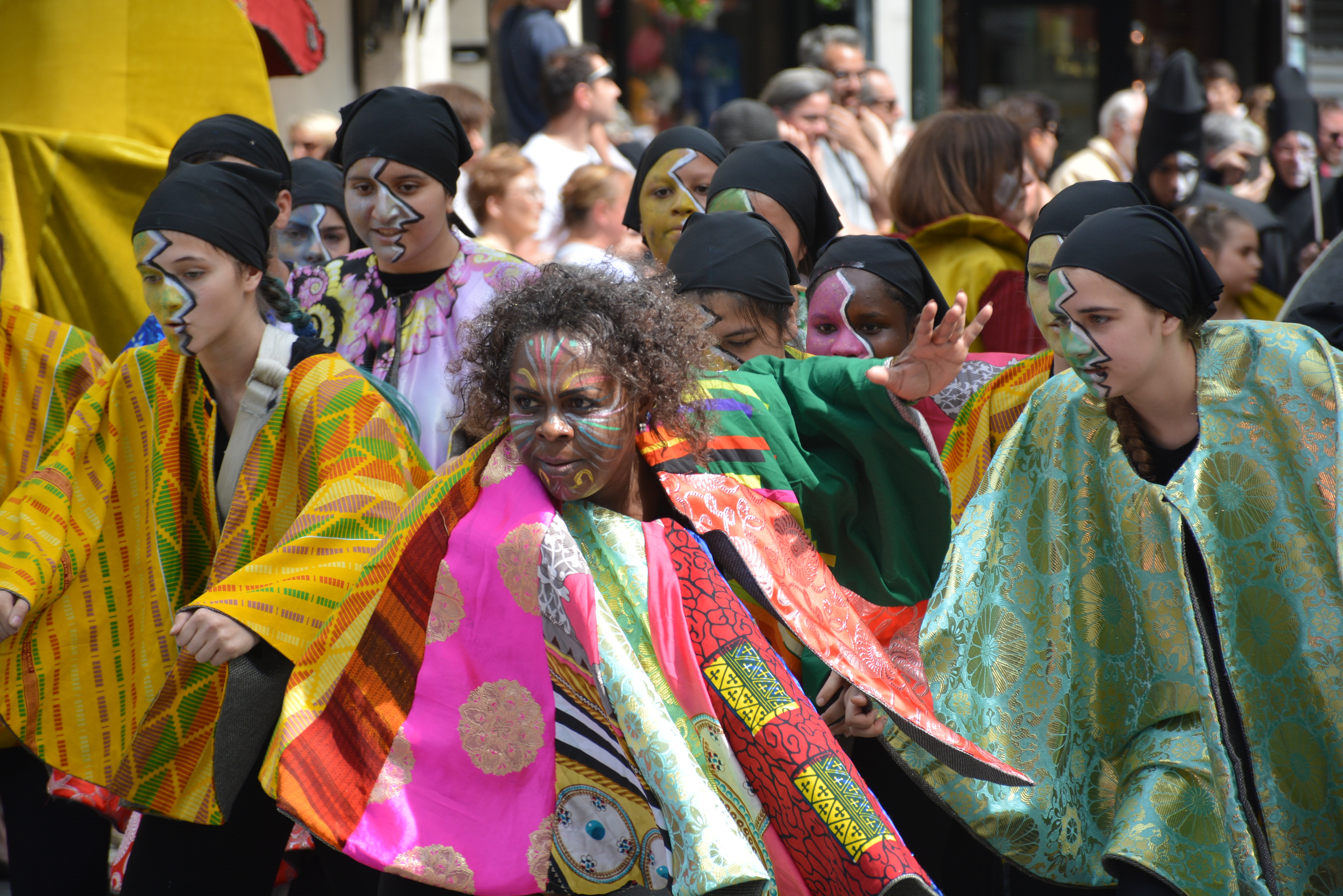
Colourfully-dressed dancers

== See also ==
- Het Zinneke
- History of Brussels
- Culture of Belgium
