= Florida Citrus Parade =

Former annual parade in Orlando, Florida

The Florida Citrus Parade was an annual parade in Orlando, Florida, that celebrated the holidays and two annual college football bowl games: the Pop-Tarts Bowl and the Citrus Bowl.

The parade would consists of both high school and Bowl-attending university marching bands from the Big Ten Conference or Atlantic Coast Conference and Southeastern Conference, along with theme park characters from Walt Disney World and Universal Orlando. Also, local and national celebrities participates in the event. The main features were the citrus-themed floats. These floats were decorated with citrus fruits in a similar style to the Lemon Festival in Menton, France. They also followed the tradition of the annual Tournament of Roses Parade in Pasadena, California. However, instead of decorating the floats with petals, they were decorated with oranges, grapefruits and tangerines.

The citrus floats were prepared and filled by over 600 volunteers during the four days between December 26th and 29th. The parade generally took place on the last week of December of every year. In rare occasions, the parade occurred on the 29th, because December 30 was a Sunday, or 31st of December, if the Citrus Bowl football game was on January 2.

== History ==
Started in 1980, the parade was previously known as the Florida Power (Progress Energy) Super Holiday Parade, the Orlando Citrus Parade, and most recently the Fresh From Florida Parade. In 2005, Delta Air Lines sponsored the parade, calling it The Orlando Citrus Parade, presented by Delta Air Lines. Since 2007, Spherion was a major sponsor of the parade along with Delta Air Lines as co-sponsor, being called The Spherion Orlando Citrus Parade, presented by Delta Air Lines. In 2011, the parade was sponsored by the Florida Department of Agriculture and Consumer Services, being renamed as the Fresh From Florida Parade for one year. Now it is known as the Florida Citrus Parade. In 2018 the parade was televised in the Orlando market as the "All New Orlando Citrus Parade" in a star studded celebration to benefit the Give Kids The World Village.

In 2019 the Orlando Citrus Parade organizers choose not to stage the event citing the cost of planning and producing the event.

The Florida Citrus Parade was an event which was planned and produced by The Florida Citrus Sports Foundation, as part of the annual Orlando Bowl Week. The event was placed in between the college football games during the last week in December.

The parade was previously videotaped and syndicated to over 100 television stations for broadcast during the New Year's Day Holiday; TVS Television Network handles distribution. Visitors to the parade can number over 50,000 along the parade route.
