= Sterner's Studio =

Historic Art Nouveau house in Brussels, Belgium

House and Workshop of master glassmaker Sterner
- Maison et Atelier du maître-verrier Sterner (French); Atelier en Woning van meester glasmaker Sterner (Dutch)
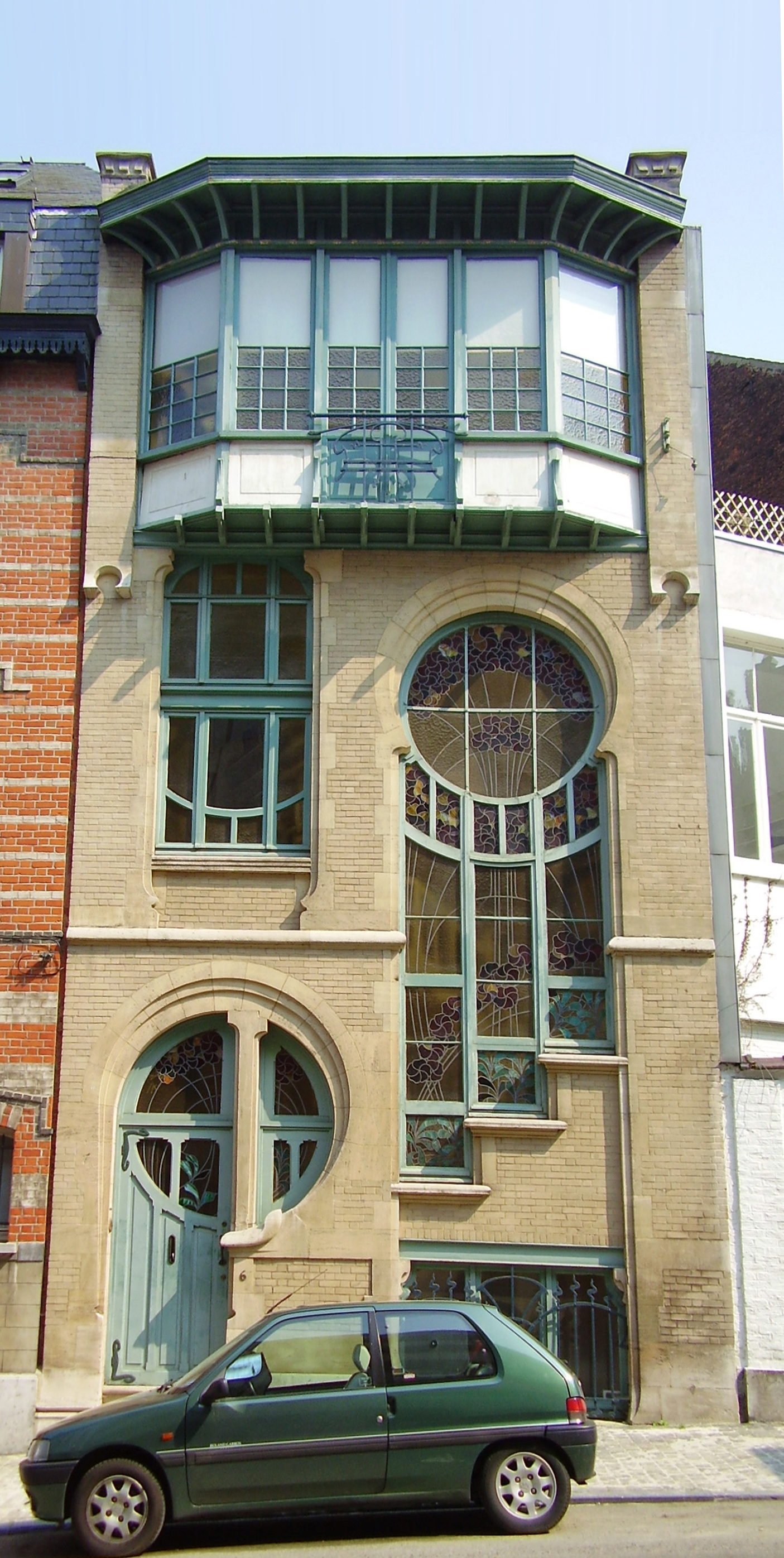
- Former house and workshop of Clas Grüner Sterner
- Interactive map of the House and Workshop of master glassmaker Sterner area

General information
- Type: Town house and workshop
- Architectural style: Art Nouveau
- Location: Rue du Lac / Meerstraat 6, 1050 Ixelles, Brussels-Capital Region, Belgium
- Coordinates: 50°49′28″N 4°22′15″E
- Construction started: 1893
- Completed: 1902

Design and construction
- Architect: Ernest Delune

The House and Workshop of master glassmaker Sterner (French: Maison et Atelier du maître-verrier Sterner; Dutch: Atelier en Woning van meester glasmaker Sterner) in Brussels, Belgium, is the former town house and workshop of the master glassworker Clas Grüner Sterner. It was designed by the architect Ernest Delune, and built between 1893 and 1902, in Art Nouveau style.

The house is located at 6, rue du Lac/Meerstraat in the municipality of Ixelles, not far from the Ixelles Ponds.

== History ==
The building was designed by architect Ernest Delune for the master glassworker Clas Grüner Sterner, "a Viennese craftsman who specialised in stained glass windows"; construction was started in 1893 and was completed in 1902.

The City of Brussels classified the property as a historic site on 23 October 2003. In a 2015 report, the city's website described the exterior in as follows:

Built in brick and white stone, it has two floors and two bays reflecting the functions assigned to the internal spaces: on the left, an entrance door opening onto the vestibule; above, upstairs, small room; on the right, monumental stained-glass window illuminating the stairwell; on the top floor, an artist's studio lit by a sort of trapezoidal bow-window occupying almost the entire width of the façade and highlighted by the cornice. The front door is adorned with stained glass windows whose patterns are in synergy with the circle that encompasses it. This circular architectural motif is also repeated in the upper part of the stained-glass window that illuminates the stairwell.

By December 2020, the building's exterior and interior were in the final phases of an extensive renovation that started in 2019. Previously, the façade had become "dangerously degraded". The most apparent modifications include repainting of the turquoise exterior with warmer earth-tones and restoration of the stained glass pieces.

== See also ==
- Art Nouveau in Brussels
- History of Brussels
- Culture of Belgium
- Belgium in the long nineteenth century
