= La Cambre (disambiguation) =

La Cambre (in Dutch: Ter Kameren or Terkameren) may refer to one of several locations in and around the municipality of Ixelles in Brussels, Belgium:

- La Cambre, a visual arts and architecture school.
- Abbey of La Cambre, a former abbey.
- Bois de la Cambre, a public park.
- Résidence de la Cambre, a historic skyscraper.

In addition, Cambre may refer to a Spanish town, in the province of A Coruña, Galicia.
