= Judith Jauregui =

Spanish pianist

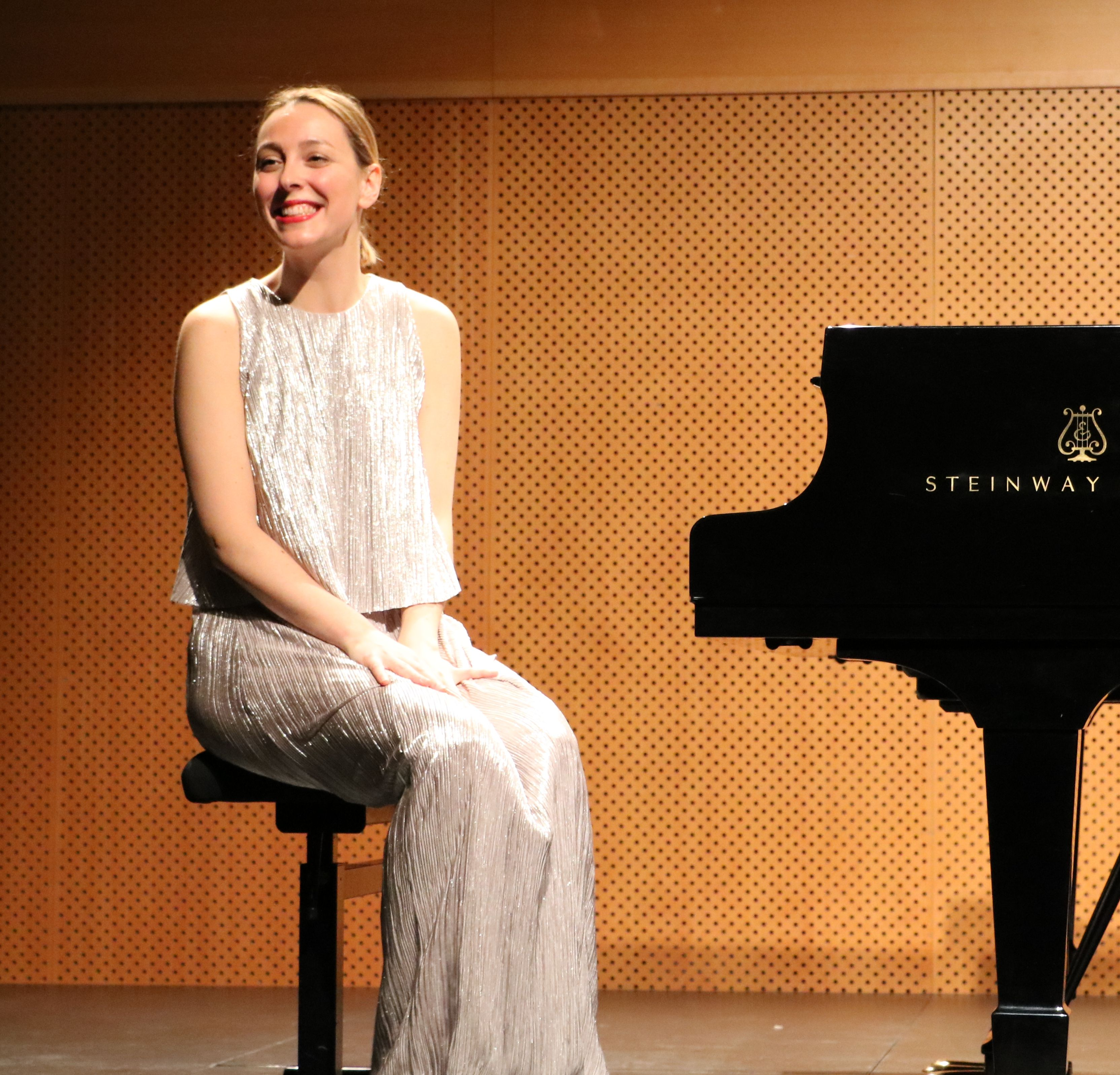
- Judith Jáuregui, pianist

Judith Jáuregui is a Spanish classical pianist known for her interpretations and recordings of works by many composers, including Albéniz, Arriaga, Granados, Grieg, Falla, Bach, Beethoven, Chopin, Liszt, and Schumann. She has performed as a soloist on many top classical music stages, such as the Auditorio Nacional in Madrid, the Palau de la Música in Barcelona, the Southbank Centre in London, the Auditorium du Louvre in Paris, the Flagey in Brussels, Konzerthaus in Berlin, Suntory Hall in Tokyo, NCPA in Beijing, Teatro Mayor in Bogotá, Schloss Elmau in Germany, and many more. She was born in San Sebastián (Basque Country) in 1985.
