= Flagey Building =

Art Deco building, now a cultural centre, in Brussels, Belgium

- Bâtiment Flagey (French); Flageygebouw (Dutch)
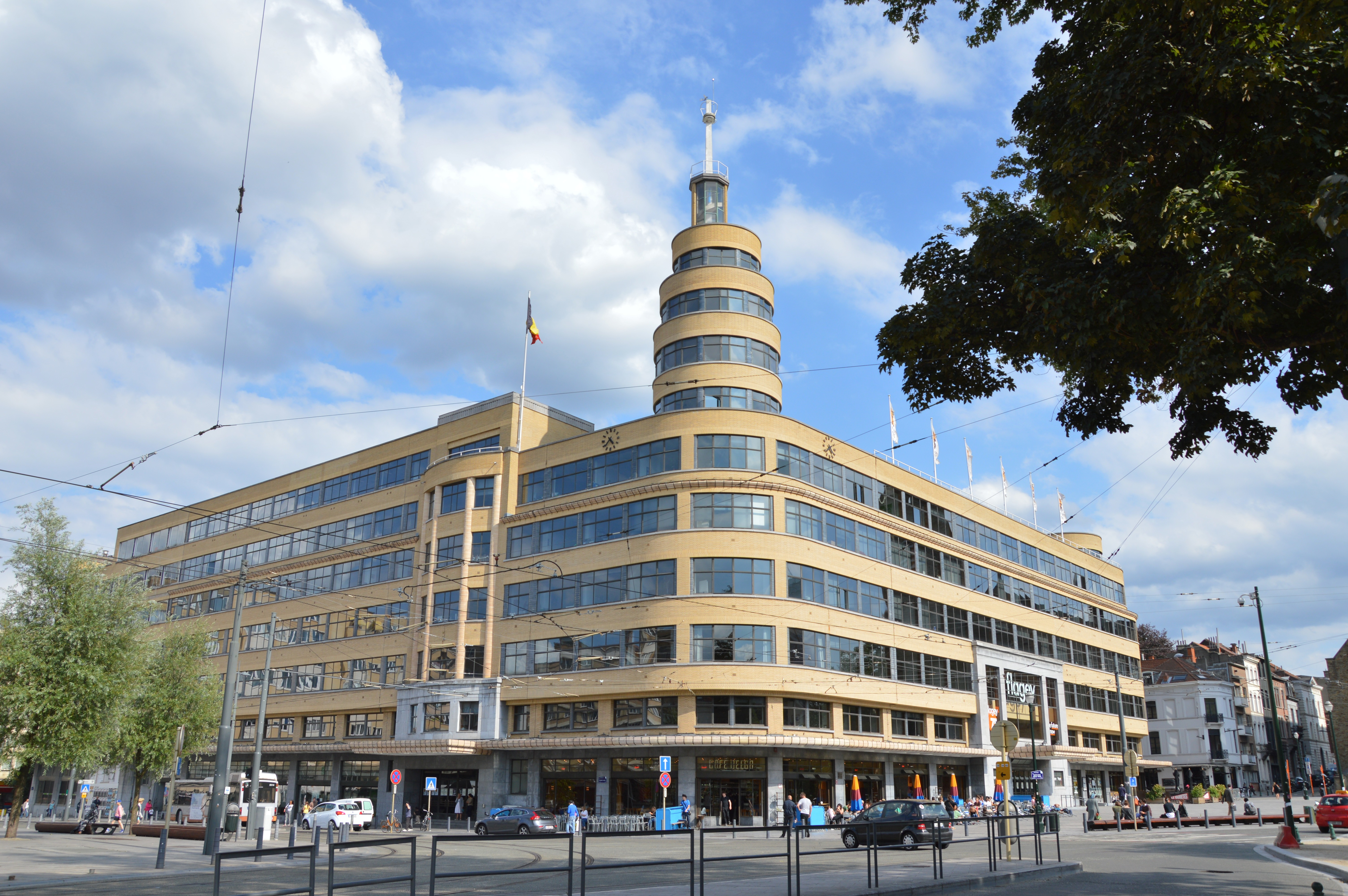
- The Flagey Building on the Place Eugène Flagey/Eugène Flageyplein, housing Le Flagey cultural centre
- Interactive map of the Flagey Building area

General information
- Architectural style: Art Deco; Streamline Moderne
- Location: Place Eugène Flagey / Eugène Flageyplein, 1050 Ixelles, Brussels-Capital Region, Belgium
- Coordinates: 50°49′36″N 4°22′22″E

The Flagey Building (French: Bâtiment Flagey; Dutch: Flageygebouw), also known as the Radio House (French: Maison de la Radio; Dutch: Radiohuis), is a building located in Ixelles, a municipality of Brussels, Belgium, housing the Flagey cultural centre. It is located on the south-western corner of the Place Eugène Flagey/Eugène Flageyplein, with its main entrance on the Place Sainte-Croix/Heilig-Kruisplein.

The building, parts of which are listed, was designed by the architect Joseph Diongre and completed in 1938 in Streamline Moderne, an international style of Art Deco. It owes its name to Eugène Flagey, a Belgian lawyer and politician who was mayor of Ixelles from 1935 to 1953. It served as the former headquarters of the National Institute of Radio Broadcasting (INR/NIR). When the broadcaster left in 1974, the building was refurbished as a cultural community centre.

== History ==
The Flagey Building, designed by Joseph Diongre after winning a competition launched in 1933, was opened in 1938. The competition was launched to create a building to house the first national broadcaster in Belgium, the National Institute of Radio Broadcasting (French: Institut National de Radiodiffusion or INR, Dutch: Nationaal Instituut voor de Radio-omroep or NIR) (1930–1960). Henry van de Velde and Victor Horta were on the jury that awarded the prize to Diongre.

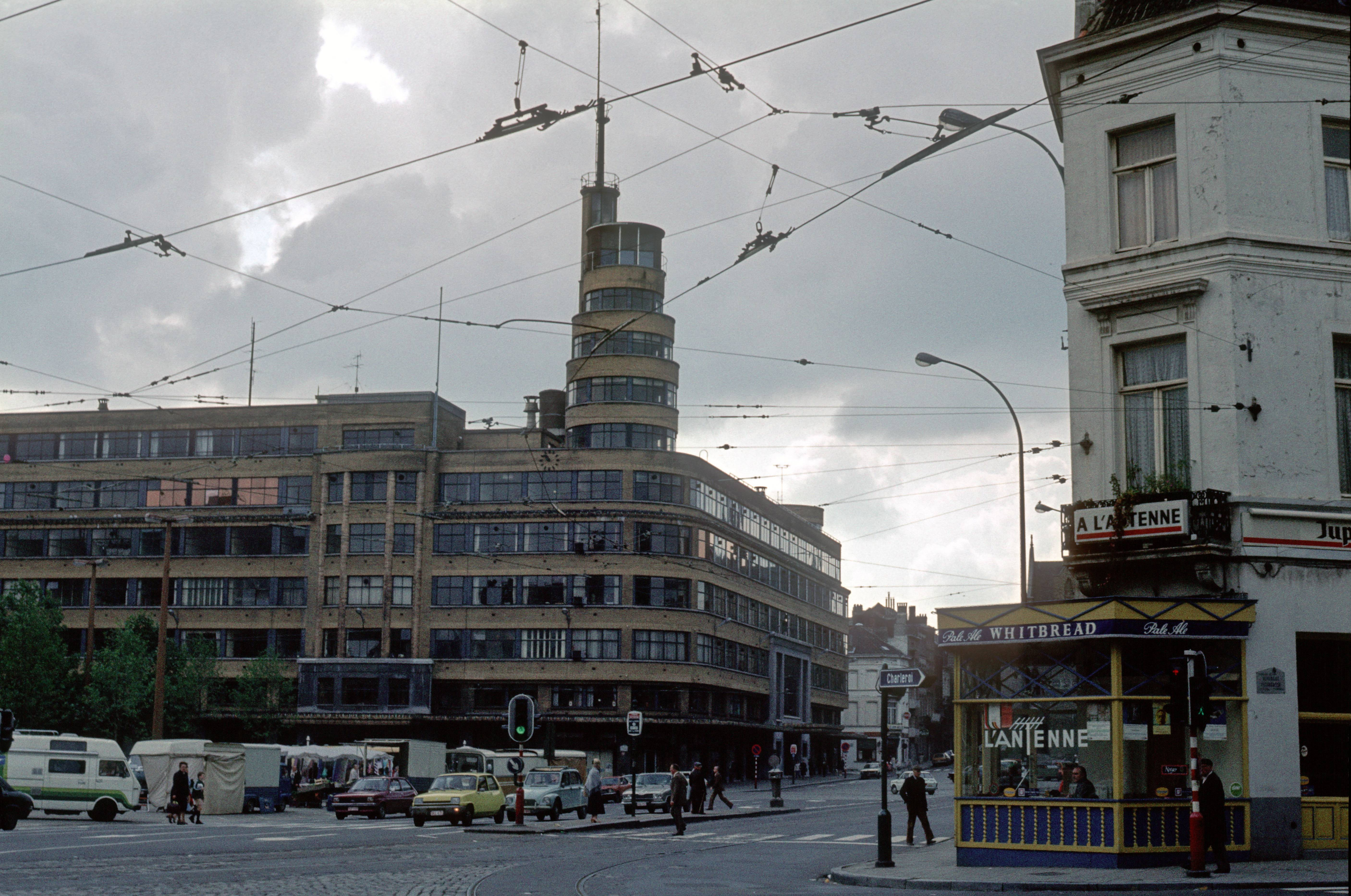
The INR/NIR building on the Place Eugène Flagey in the 1980s

The building owes its name to Eugène Flagey, a Belgian lawyer and politician who served as mayor of Ixelles from 1935 to 1953. It is designed in Streamline Moderne, an international style of Art Deco, also known as style paquebot ("ocean liner style") in France. Owing to its shape somewhat resembling a ship, the building is nicknamed "Packet Boat" or "paquebot". The interiors included much wood panelling and thin tube lamps, typical of the style.

The building garnered critical acclaim as soon as it was finished, and the qualities of the studios attracted renowned classical, contemporary and jazz musicians to perform there (including Chuck Berry, Jerry Lee Lewis and Chet Baker), for live concerts and recordings.

The INR/NIR was later split into separate broadcasting entities, one for each language, the Dutch-language VRT and the French-speaking RTBF, before they moved out of the building completely in 1974 (after growing out of it) and leased it to various other cultural bodies until the late 1990s. During this time, it was poorly maintained. In 1997, a working group convened to create a feasibility study for a complete renovation of the building.

Established as a public limited company (société anonyme), the consortium Maison de la Radio Flagey (NV Omroepgebouw Flagey) purchased the building from the VRT and RTBF on 30 June 1998, with 30 companies working towards saving the building. The building was extensively renovated by architects including Storme Van Ranst, and was reopened in 2002.

== Description ==
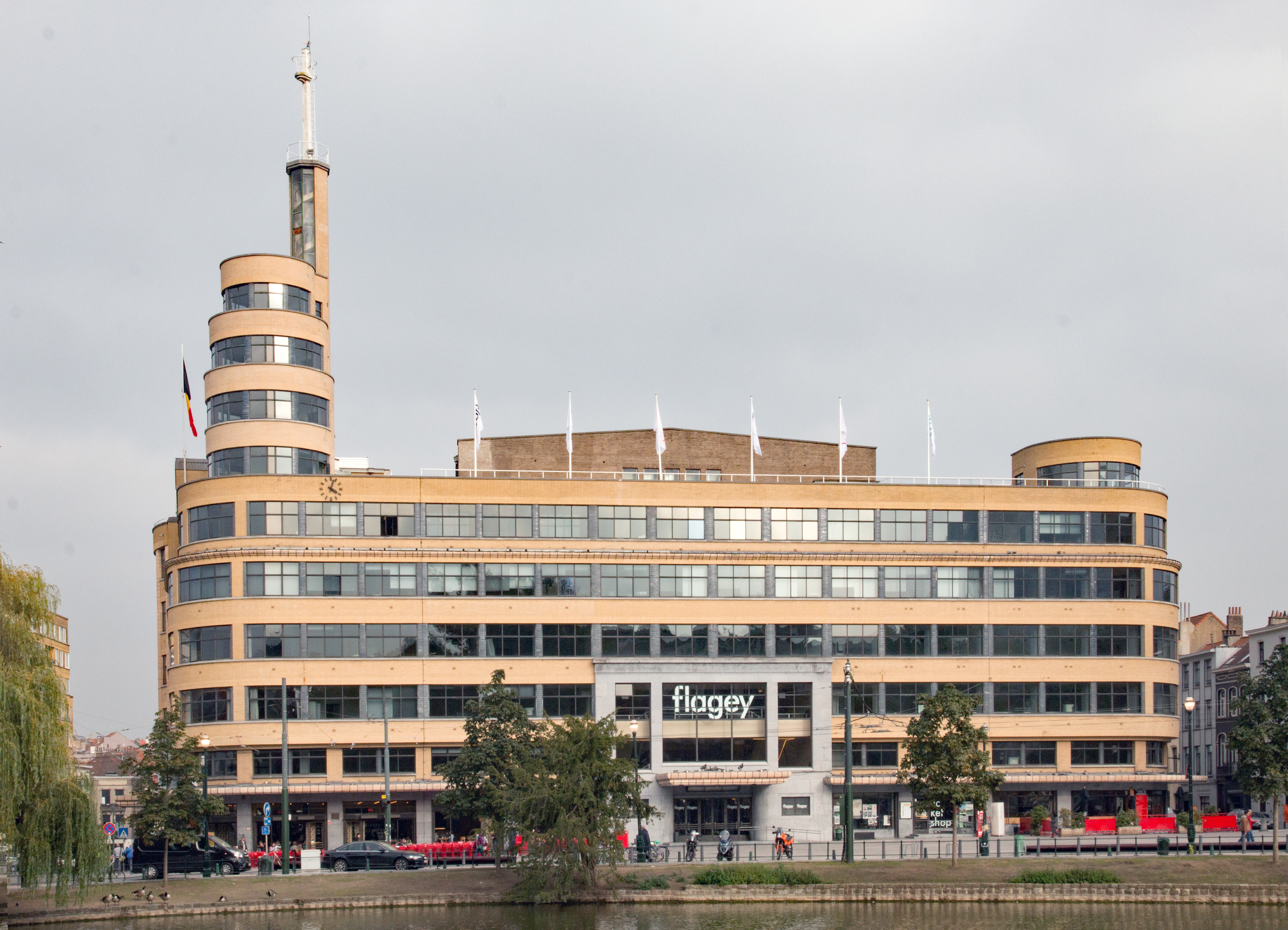
Entrance on the Place Sainte-Croix/Heilig-Kruisplein

The building occupies a large site in the south-western corner of the square, with its main entrance on the Place Sainte-Croix. A number of trams and buses provide transport to the location.

As a non-profit organisation Le Flagey has the following aims:

- to create a cultural pole in Brussels, open to diverse musical styles, offering a large part to the image of different artistic disciplines;
- to create an architectural and real-estate pole by safeguarding and reallocating the former building of the RTBF;
- to create a pole at the social level by demonstrating a joint action by representatives of the country's different communities with a view to creating a cultural institution of excellence with a European vocation. It also located in between the upmarket Ixelles Ponds and the world of immigrant cultures.

The central portion of the building is dedicated to cultural activities, with five recording studios that are flexible in size and function. Part of the building is listed as a protected monument by the Monuments and Sites Directorate of the Brussels-Capital Region.

The institution was led by director Hugo De Greef from 2007 until 2011, and since then, by Gilles Ledure.

== Recording studios ==
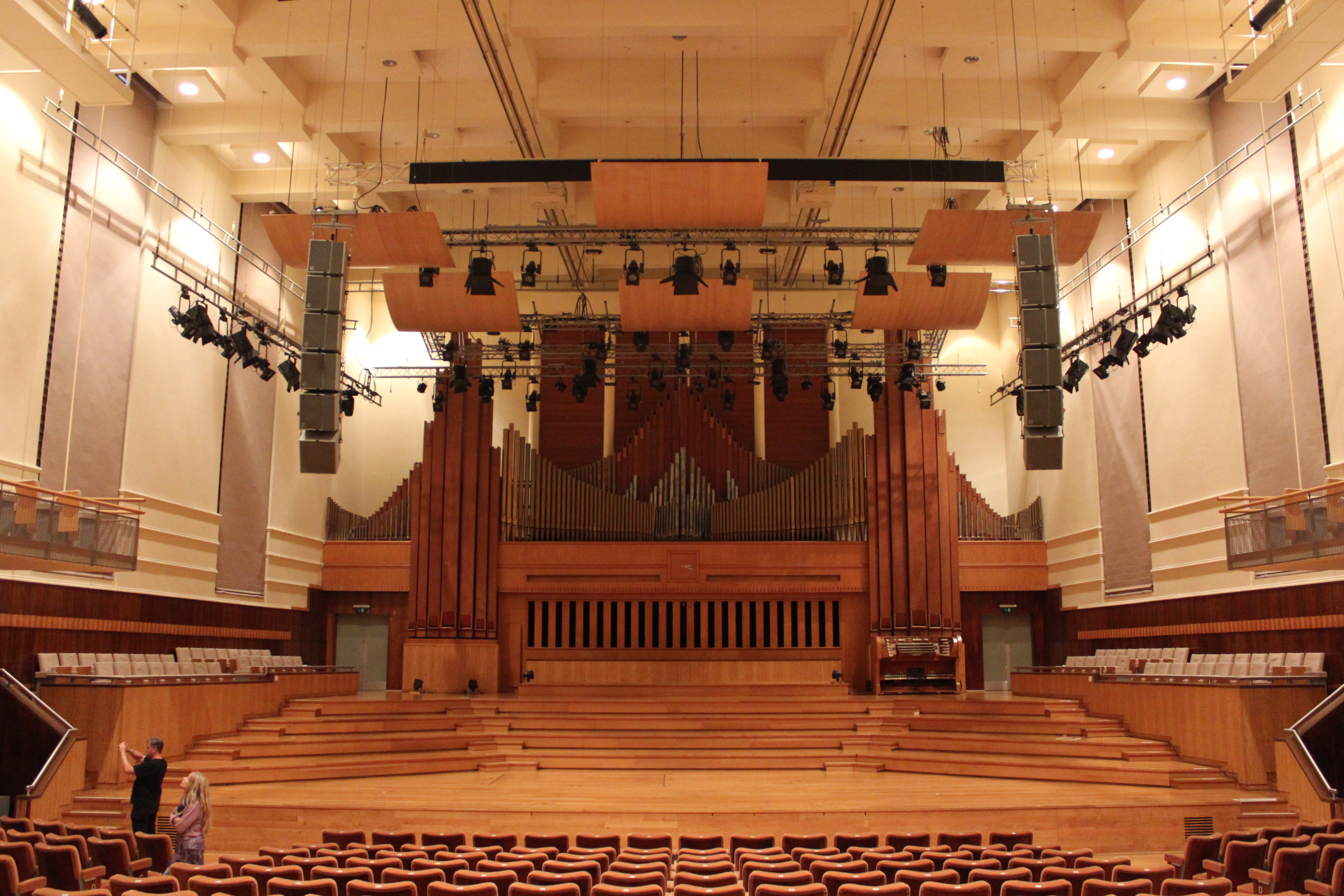
Studio 4, showing the organ

The original design incorporated twelve recording studios, which were built in two acoustic towers forming the core of the building. The 2002 renovation restored the Flagey Building's original functions by creating a musical space with recording studios and concerts venues, allowing it to host an eclectic programme of events.

Its Studio 4 is one of the concert halls with the best acoustics worldwide, home to the Brussels Philharmonic. The whole back wall is occupied by an organ, specially designed for this space and built by the Tournai organ-builder Maurice Delmotte. Studio 4 is also used as a recording studio. The award-winning soundtrack, released in 2005 for Martin Scorsese's 2004 film The Aviator, was recorded there, as well as the musical score of the award-winning movie The Artist in 2011.

== Events ==
=== Cinema ===
The centre has a room permanently dedicated to cinema. It screens films programmed by CINEMATEK (French: Cinémathèque royale de Belgique, Dutch: Koninklijk Belgisch Filmarchief), usually classic films or recent curiosities that have not been distributed in the commercial network. Exceptional screenings are sometimes organised in the concert hall, the largest in Brussels, where a huge screen is installed for the event. In 2003, Playtime by Jacques Tati was screened there in its original version in 70 mm, for the first time in Belgium.

The Brussels Short Film Festival (BSFF) uses Flagey as one of its locations for screenings and other events. The festival then named the Brussels European Film Festival, later the Brussels Film Festival (BRFF), took place in April, and a series known as Spanish and Latin American Cinema took place in November, as of 2012. The first edition of the Brussels International Film Festival (BRIFF) took place in the building in 2018.

=== Music ===
Aside from being home to the Brussels Philharmonic, the centre hosts Flagey Piano Days (featuring US pianist Stephen Kovacevich in 2017), and the Brussels Jazz Festival has taken place there since 2015. Flagey is also home to other jazz events, such as the Brussels Jazz Marathon and the Brussels Jazz Platform.

== See also ==
- Art Deco in Brussels
- History of Brussels
- Culture of Belgium
