= Brussels International Film Festival (1974–2016) =

Belgian film festival 1974–2016

The Brussels International Film Festival (BRFF), also known as the Brussels European Film Festival or the Brussels Film Festival in its later years, was an annual event showcasing works of European cinema, held at Le Flagey in Brussels, Belgium. It ran from 1974 at various locations until 2003, when it moved to the Flagey Building, and held its last edition in 2016. Its top prize was known as the Golden Iris.

== History ==
The first Brussels International Film Festival took place in January 1974, on the initiative of the Chambre Syndicale Belge de la Cinématographie and Dimitri Balachoff. From 1975 the festival was renamed the Festival International du Film de Bruxelles (Brussels International Film Festival) and was acknowledged by the Fédération Internationale des Associations de Producteurs de Films (FIAPF). In 1990 the organisation was taken over by K Com, a communications agency, and from that time it was the only film festival in Belgium supported by both Flemish- and French-speakers. Three years later, a new section was created, dedicated to the cinema of a chosen European country. In 1998, its 25th anniversary, the Festival was hosted by Ireland, and moved locations in ensuing years.

In 2002 the festival found itself without a home, owing to the bankruptcy of the Kladaradatsch! Palace, and organisers had to cancel the 29th edition. In 2003 Dominique Janne took the helm and the festival moved to Fagey. It was referred to as the Brussels European Film Festival; IMDb says that the Brussels International Film Festival was succeeded by the Brussels European Film Festival in 2000. It was renamed Brussels Film Festival at some point.

From 2009, the festival was associated Prix LUX, and Ivan Corbisier became director of the event in December of that year, with his first festival in 2010.

In its later years, programming comprised seven sections: Competition, which included European and world premiere feature films; Panorama, "an overview of contemporary European cinema"; Premiers (sic); Open-air, with a screening each night in Place Sainte-Croix (Flagey Square); Short film competition; and a Retrospective, featuring the work of great filmmakers such as Bertrand Tavernier, Peter Greenaway, Alan Parker and Jacques Doillon.

The festival name is abbreviated as BRFF.

=== 13th edition (2015) ===
The 13th Brussels Film Festival was held from 5 to 12 June 2015 and featured French actress Juliette Binoche as its guest of honor. The festival's top prize, the Golden Iris, was awarded to German director Christian Frosch for the film Rough Road Ahead.

=== Final edition (2016) ===
The last (14th) edition of the Brussels Film Festival appears to have taken place in 2016. The 15th edition (2017) had to be cancelled after subsidies were withdrawn, but director Ivan Corbisier mounted a special series for the public, called 14 days of European cinema.
