= Place Eugène Flagey =

Square in Brussels, Belgium

Place Eugène Flagey (French); Eugène Flageyplein (Dutch)
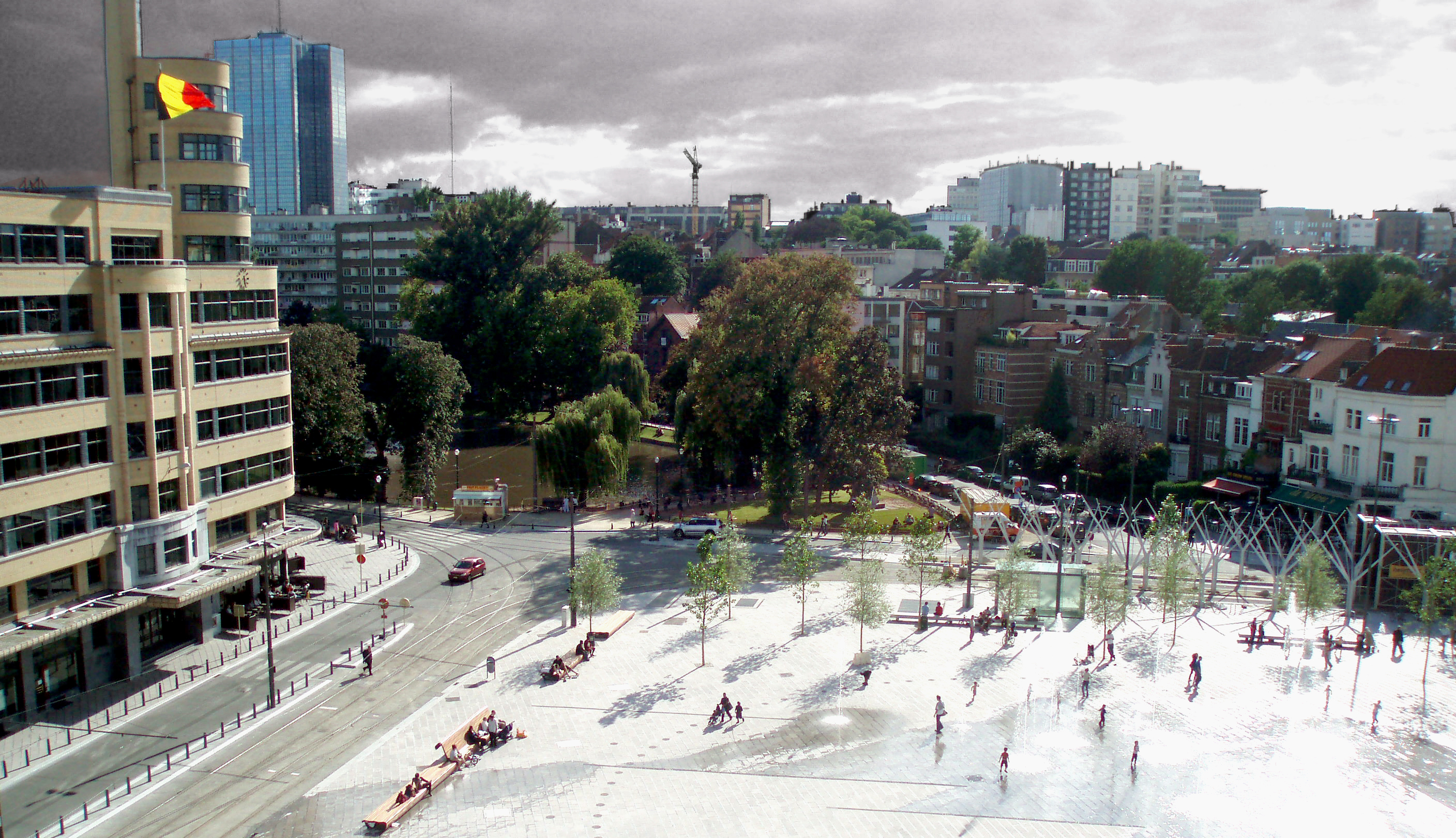
- The Place Eugène Flagey/Eugène Flageyplein as it appears today

- Location within Brussels Location within Belgium
- Namesake: Eugène Flagey
- Type: Square
- Location: Ixelles, Brussels-Capital Region, Belgium
- Postal code: 1050
- Coordinates: 50°49′40″N 04°22′20″E

Construction
- Completion: c. 1953

The Place Eugène Flagey (French, pronounced [plas ø.ʒɛn fla.ʒɛ]) or Eugène Flageyplein (Dutch, pronounced [øˈʒɛn flaˈʒɛiˌplɛin]), usually shortened to the Place Flagey, or Flagey by locals, is a square in the Ixelles municipality of Brussels, Belgium. It bears the name of Eugène Flagey, a former mayor of Ixelles.

With ten streets converging there, the Place Flagey is one of the best connected crossroads in the city, directly adjacent to the neighbouring Ixelles Ponds. Until 1937, the square was known as the Place Sainte-Croix/Heilig-Kruisplein, but this name only now applies to the square in front of the Church of the Holy Cross on the south-western corner.

The Flagey Building, also known as the Radio House, is an Art Deco building, the former headquarters of the Belgian National Institute of Radio Broadcasting, and now houses Le Flagey cultural centre. It is located on the south-western corner of the square, with its entrance on the Place Sainte-Croix.

== History ==
=== Early history ===
The area comprising the Place Eugène Flagey was covered by the Ixelles Ponds until 1860 when one of the original ponds was drained as part of a new urban design. The square was originally known as the Place Sainte-Croix/Heilig-Kruisplein ("Holy Cross' Square") after the Hospice de la Sainte-Croix, a hospice located at the bottom of the current Rue de Vergnies/De Vergniesstraat. The square was renamed in 1937 by the lawyer and politician Eugène Flagey, who served as mayor of Ixelles from 1935 to 1956. The Place Sainte-Croix remains limited today to the front of the Church of the Holy Cross (French: Église Sainte-Croix, Dutch: Heilig-Kruiskerk), on the edge of the ponds.

The construction of the area around the Place Eugène Flagey continued after World War II, between 1948 and 1963. The ensemble, although built in nearly thirty years in post-war functionalist style, displays a great homogeneity. Each building has a similar height, a yellow brick façade, a commercial ground floor surmounted by a mezzanine and crowned with a concrete awning, as well as a roof terrace. These latter elements give the set almost continuous horizontal lines, but each building nevertheless retains its architectural specificities. On 18 December 1957, the first self-service store in Belgium, by the Delhaize brothers, opened on the square, across from the Flagey Building.

=== Renovation (2004–2008) ===
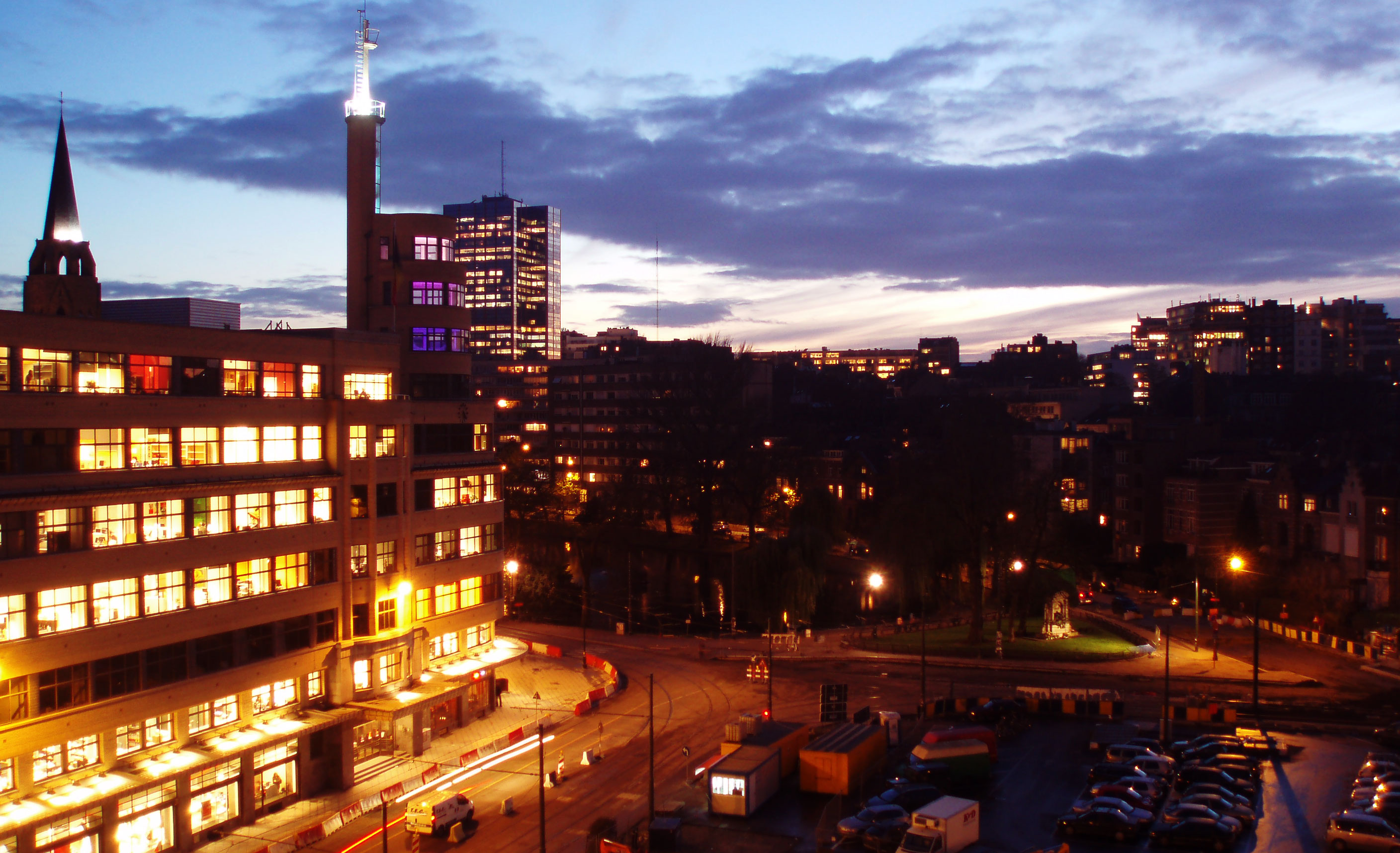
The Place Eugène Flagey/Eugène Flageyplein before renovation

Beginning in 2002, the square was extensively renovated. Prior to the renovation, it had been primarily used as an open-air parking lot. The project was infamously delayed many times and all activity had to grind to a halt for sometimes months on end. The plans were remade in 2004, partially on the demand of the local residents' association. Among their demands were the complete elimination of above ground parking in the square. The original plan was not deemed ambitious enough and a new competition was launched for international bids from different architects. Latz&Partner and D + A International eventually won the contract.

Official celebrations for the reopening of the Place Eugène Flagey took place in July 2008. Events held included fireworks, concerts, guided visits and film screenings. However, at the time of the official opening, the subterranean car park that was built below the square was not opened. The risk of flooding as well as other structural problems forced authorities to keep the facility closed. The car park finally opened on 15 November 2010. A large flood control reservoir for storm water (necessary due to the low-lying terrain and high groundwater level) has also been built under the square.

For some years until its last edition in 2016, an open-air screening of a film each night during the Brussels Film Festival (BRFF) took place in the square.

== Naming ==
The square is usually named Flagey Square or Place Flagey in English sources, Place (Eugène) Flagey in French sources, and (Eugène) Flageyplein in Dutch sources. Flagey more often refers to the Flagey Building than the whole square, although it is sometimes used for the latter. Because the building's entrance is on the Place Sainte-Croix/Heilig-Kruisplein, one of these names is also usually given as its address.

== Places of interest ==
The Place Eugène Flagey is known for:

- the Flagey Building, also known as the Radio House (1935–1938), the former headquarters of the Belgian National Institute of Radio Broadcasting (INR/NIR), a Streamline Moderne building occupying its entire southern side, renamed Le Flagey in 2002. It now hosts a cultural centre, which includes concert halls, cinemas and recording studios. Its Studio 4 is one of the concert halls with the best acoustics in the world.
- the building on the opposite side of the square to Le Flagey, which houses the first supermarket ever opened in Belgium, on 18 December 1957, a Delhaize
- the monument dedicated to the novelist Charles De Coster (1894), by Charles Samuel and Franz De Vestel, on the Ixelles Ponds' side
- the Frit Flagey friterie, serving chips cooked the traditional Belgian way, reputed to be among the best in Brussels
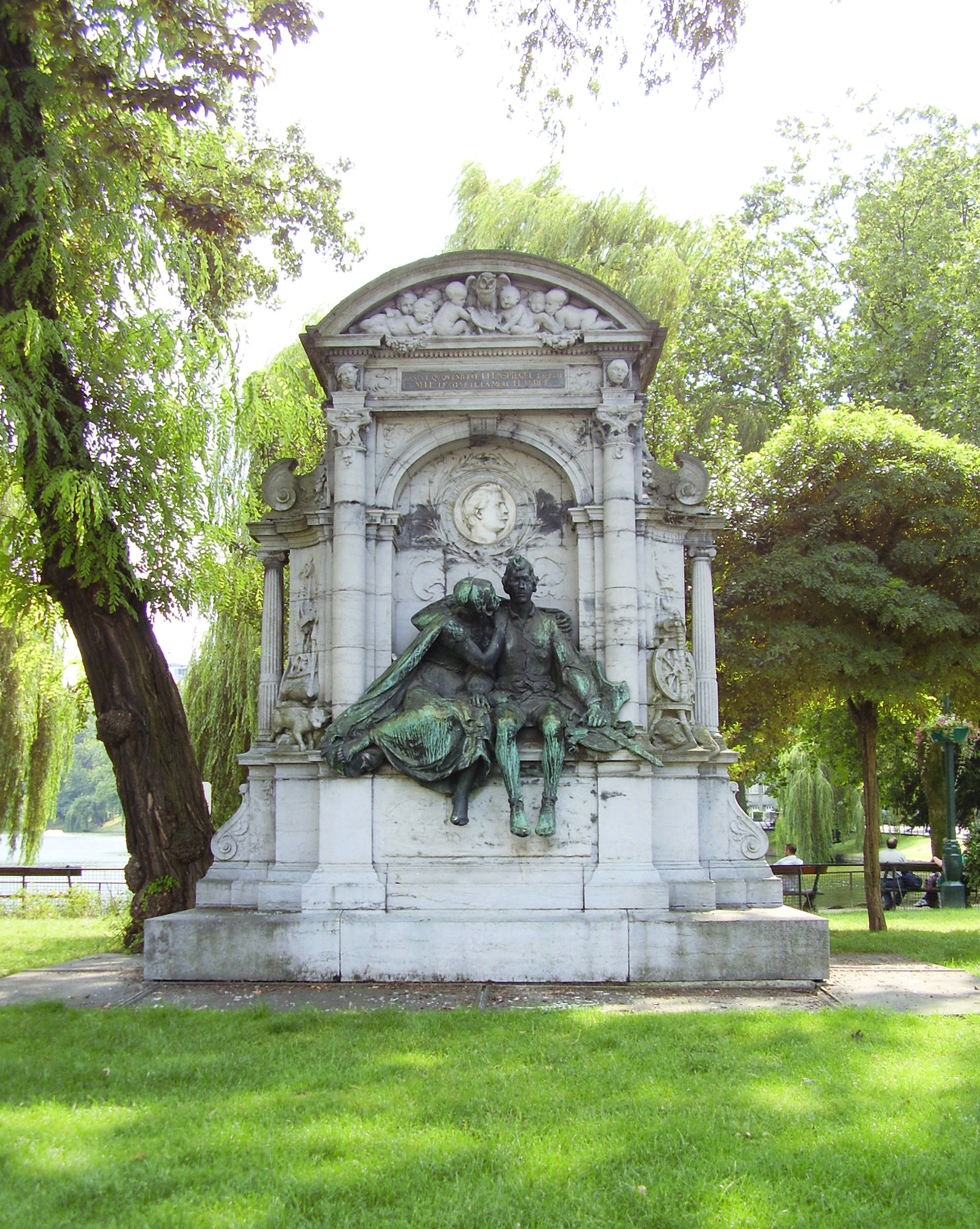
Monument to Charles De Coster (Samuel and De Vestel, 1894)

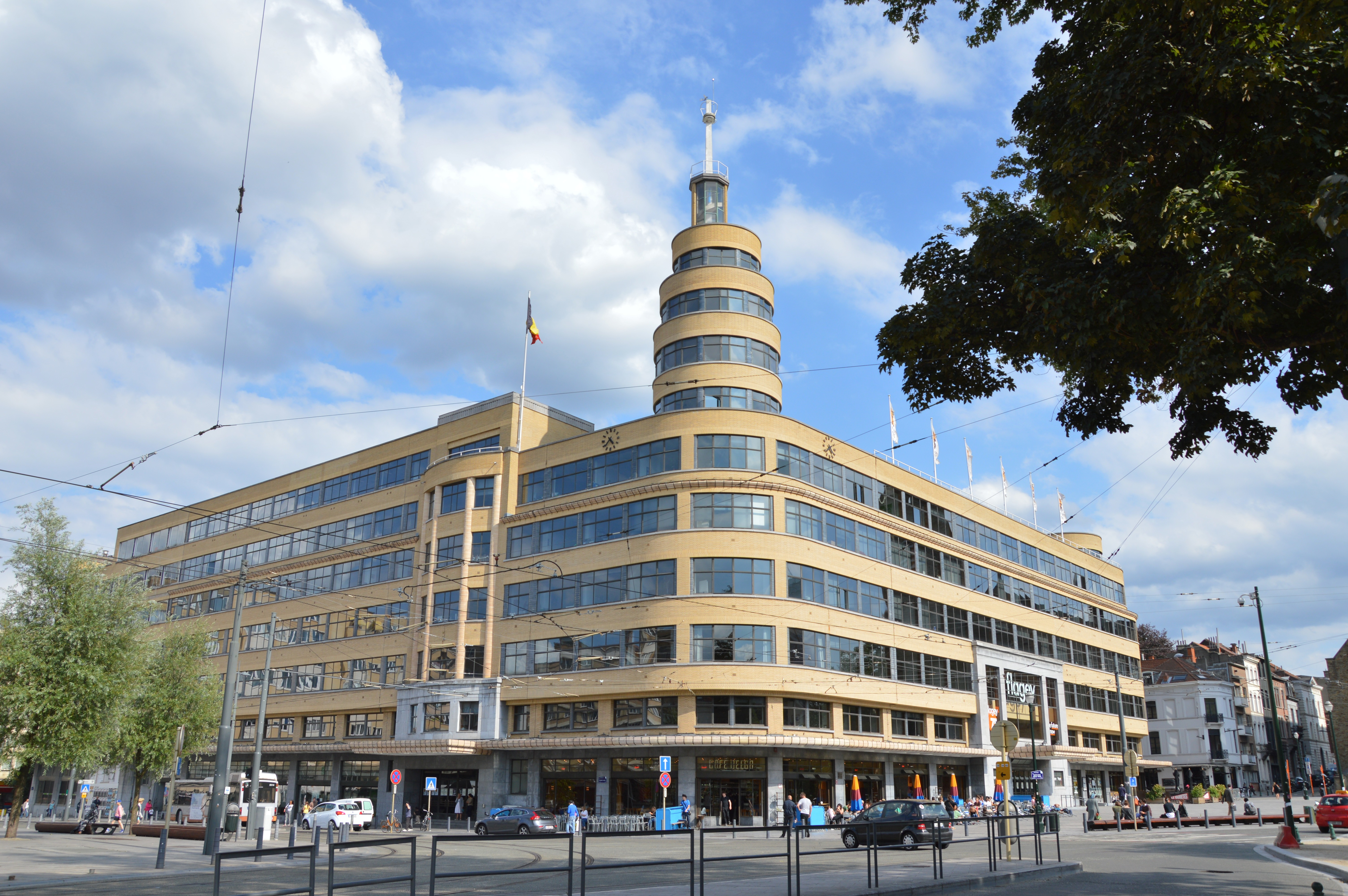
Flagey Building or Radio House (Diongre, 1935–1938)

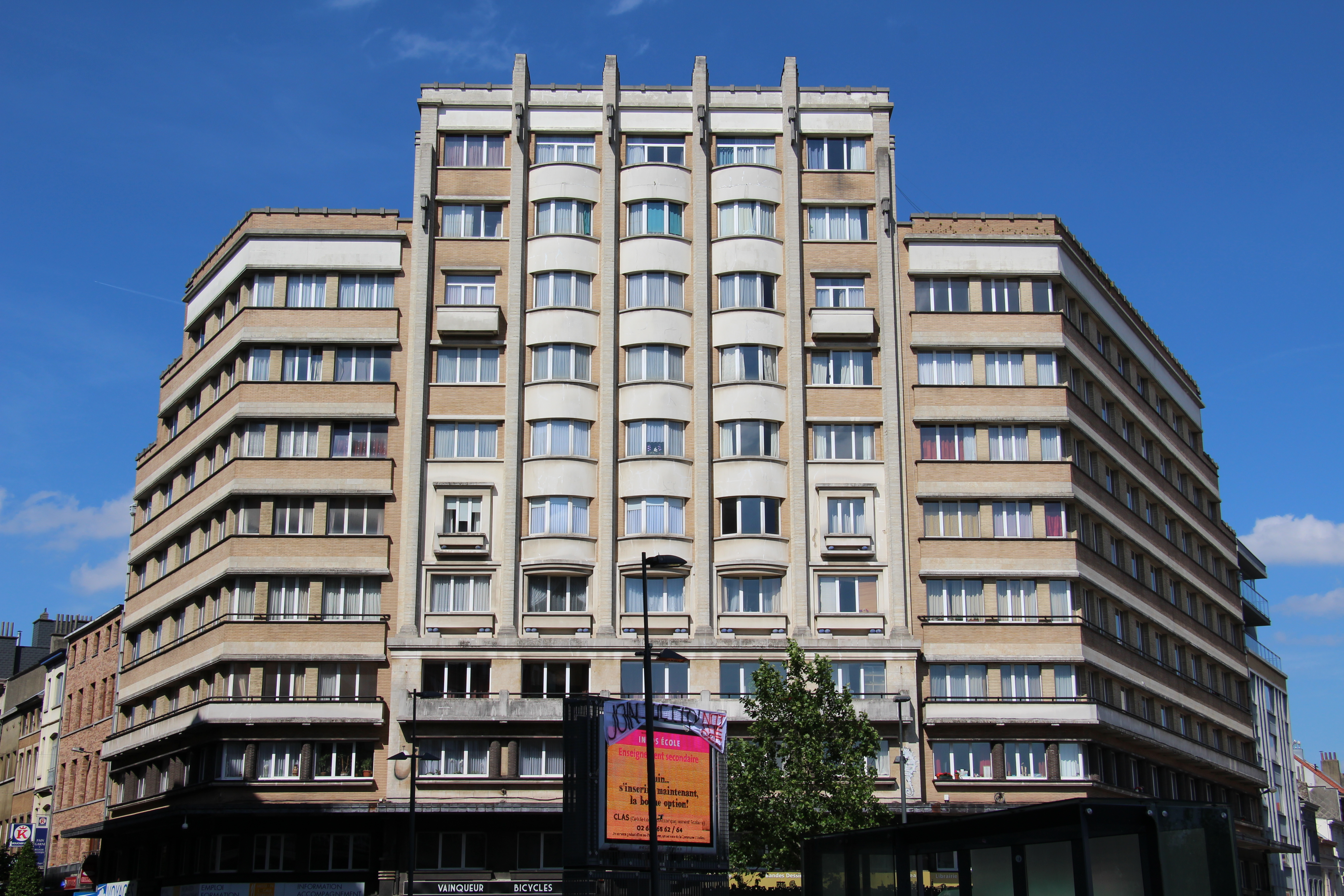
Apartment building (Poppe, 1938)

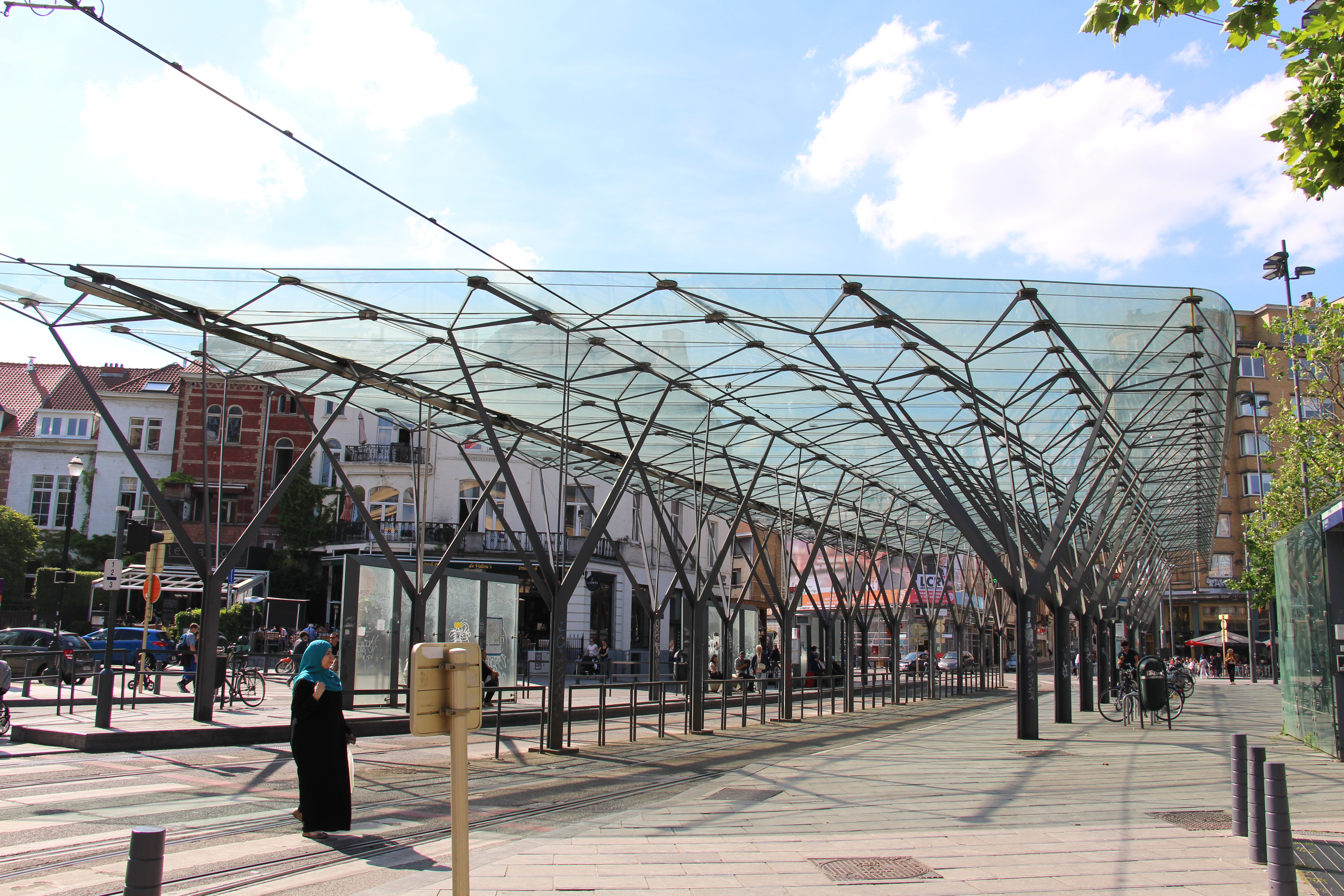
Flagey tram and bus station (2004–2008)

== Location and accessibility ==
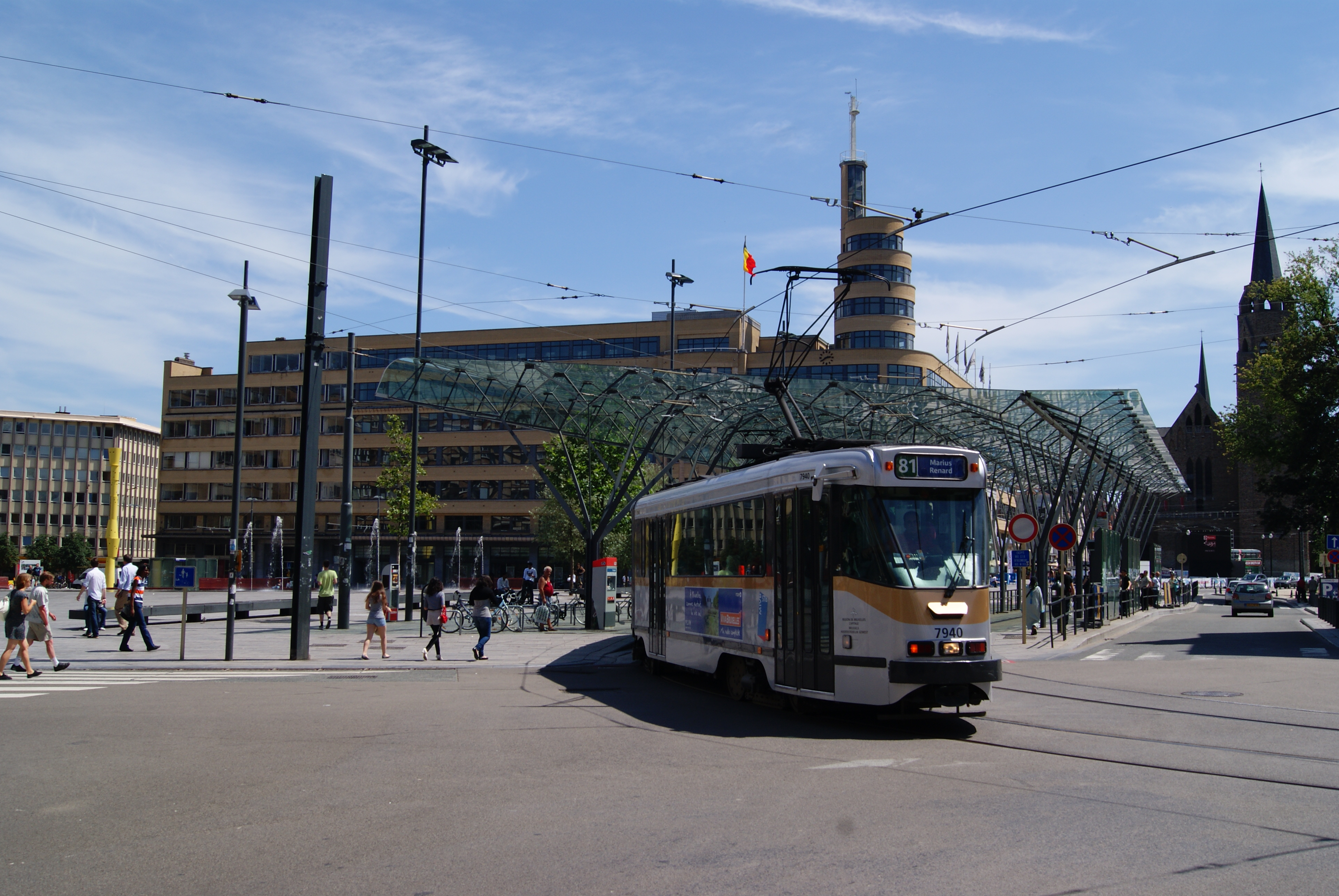
Tram on the Place Eugène Flagey

The Place Eugène Flagey forms a trapezoid where a large number of roads begin and end: to the north, the Chaussée d'Ixelles/Elsense Steenweg and the Rue de Vergnies/De Vergniesstraat; to the east, the Rue Malibran/Malibranstraat, the Rue des Cygnes/Zwanenstraat and the Rue de la Brasserie/Brouwerijstraat; to the south, the Chaussée de Boondael/Boondaalse Steenweg and the Place Sainte-Croix/Heilig-Kruisplein; to the west, the Avenue du Général de Gaulle/Generaal de Gaullelaan, the Chaussée de Vleurgat/Vleurgatse Steenweg and the Rue Lesbroussart/Lesbroussartstraat. It is also on its west side that it is bordered by the tip of the Ixelles Ponds.

The Place Eugène Flagey is served by several STIB/MIVB lines: tram line 81 and bus lines 38, 59, 60 and 71, as well as TEC Walloon Brabant bus line 366. The square also hosts a Villo! shared bicycle station, as well as shared car stations (Cambio and Zen Car).

== See also ==
- Art Deco in Brussels
- History of Brussels
- Belgium in the long nineteenth century
