= The Aviator (soundtrack) =

The Aviator: Music from the Motion Picture

Soundtrack album by Howard Shore
- Released: 2005
- Genre: Soundtrack
- Length: 47:00
- Label: Columbia

Howard Shore chronology
The Lord of the Rings: The Return of the King (2003)	The Aviator: Music from the Motion Picture (2005)	A History of Violence (2005)

Professional ratings
Review scores
Source	Rating
ScoreNotes	7.5/10 stars

The Aviator: Music from the Motion Picture is the soundtrack album to the 2004 film The Aviator starring Leonardo DiCaprio, Cate Blanchett and Alan Alda. The original score and songs were composed and conducted by Howard Shore and performed by Brussels Philharmonic (former Flemish Radio Orchestra). It was recorded at Studio 4 of the Flagey Building in Brussels, Belgium.

The album won the Golden Globe Award for Best Original Score. It was also nominated for a Grammy Award for Best Score Soundtrack for Visual Media.

The soundtrack makes use of orchestral works, such as Johann Sebastian Bach's Toccata and Fugue in D minor, BWV 565 and Pyotr Ilyich Tchaikovsky's Symphony No. 6 (Pathétique). It also uses Artie Shaw's composition "Nightmare" when Hughes is dealing with Faith, Ava and Katherine throughout the film. This was a piece personally chosen by Scorsese himself.

== Track listing ==
1. "Icarus" – 3:58
2. "There Is No Great Genius Without Some Form of Madness" – 2:50
3. "Muirfield" – 2:22
4. "H-1 Racer Plane" – 3:20
5. "Quarantine" – 3:52
6. "Hollywood 1927" – 2:59
7. "The Mighty Hercules" – 3:32
8. "Howard Robard Hughes, Jr." – 3:57
9. "America's Aviation Hero" – 2:05
10. "7000 Romaine" – 2:22
11. "The Germ Free Zone" – 2:49
12. "Screening Room" – 5:27
13. "Long Beach Harbour 1947" – 3:49
14. "The Way of the Future" – 4:01

== Charts ==
=== Weekly charts ===
Weekly chart performance for The Aviator
Chart (2005)	Peak position
UK Soundtrack Albums (Official Charts)	45
US Top Jazz Albums (Billboard)	11

=== Year-end charts ===
Year-end chart performance for The Aviator
Chart (2005)	Position
US Top Jazz Albums (Billboard)	18
