= Résidence de la Cambre =

First high-rise building in Brussels, Belgium

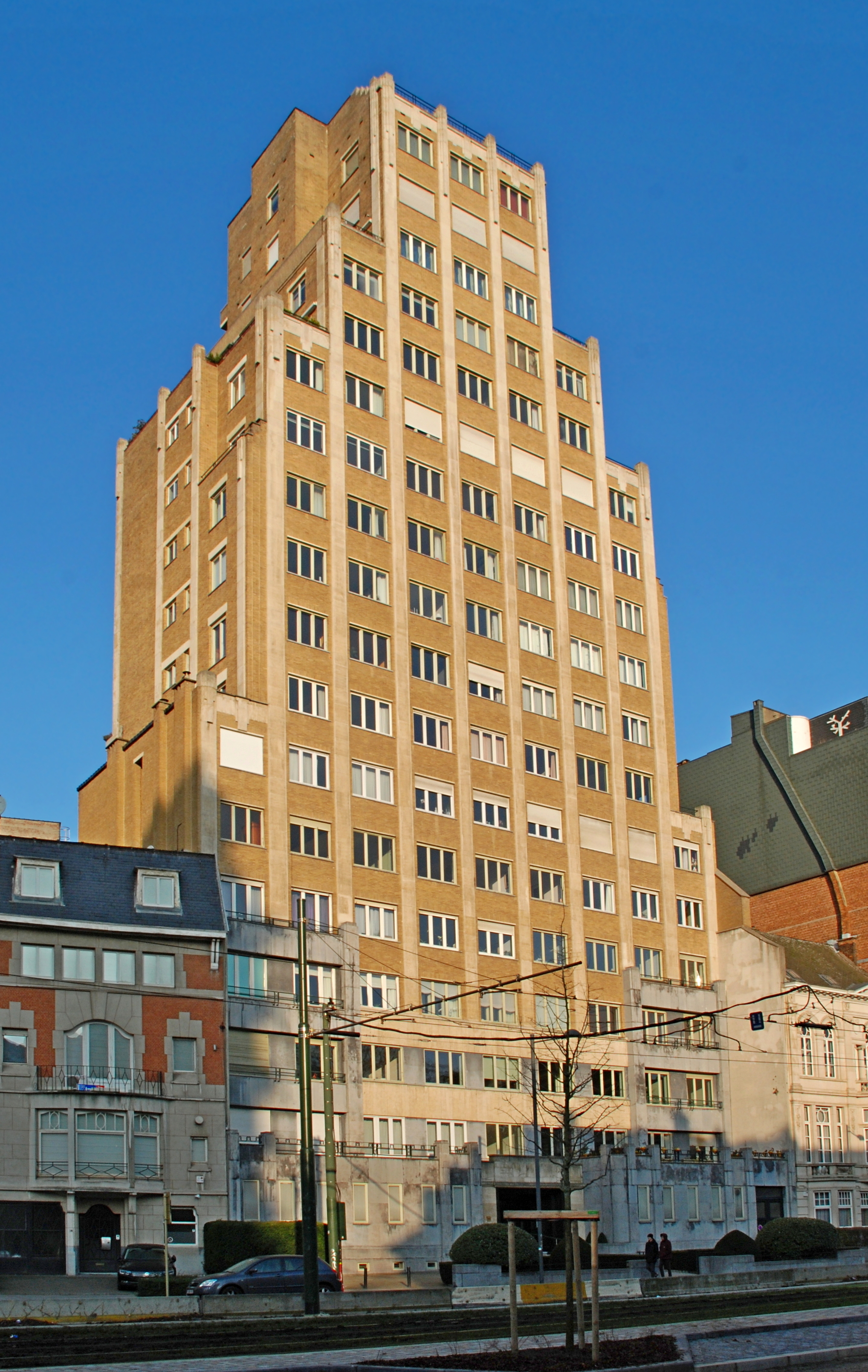
- Résidence de la Cambre
- Interactive map of the Résidence de la Cambre area

General information
- Architectural style: Art Deco
- Location: Boulevard Général Jacques / Generaal Jacqueslaan 20, 1050 Ixelles, Brussels-Capital Region, Belgium
- Coordinates: 50°49′2.33″N 4°22′40.92″E

Design and construction
- Architect: Marcel Peeters

The Résidence de la Cambre is the first high-rise building constructed in Brussels, Belgium. It was built in 1938–39, according to the plans of the architect Marcel Peeters, in a style inspired by New York Art Deco architecture. The 17-storey residential tower was listed as a protected monument on 14 July 2005.

The Résidence de la Cambre stands at 20, boulevard Général Jacques/Generaal Jacqueslaan, near the Place de l'Étoile/Sterrenplein in Ixelles. It is a short walk from La Cambre Abbey and the eastern shores of the Ixelles Ponds, a part of Brussels that is particularly rich in Art Deco architecture.

== Architecture ==
Nicknamed The Chicago Building (French: La tour Chicago) because of its symmetrically stepped profile, the building is primarily made of concrete, but its facade is mainly covered in Boom brick with white stone on the pinnacles, as well as gray stone and Swedish granite on the facing of the ground floor. Hergé is said to have used it as inspiration for his portrayal of Chicago in Tintin in America.

== Protection status ==
The building was classified as a protected monument on 14 July 2005, on the initiative of Emir Kir, the mayor of Saint-Josse-ten-Noode. In April 2007, €740,000 were granted by the Government of the Brussels-Capital Region to renovate the facade and roof.

== See also ==
- Art Deco in Brussels
- History of Brussels
