= Ixelles Ponds =

Ponds in Ixelles, Belgium

- Étangs d'Ixelles (French); Vijvers van Elsene (Dutch)
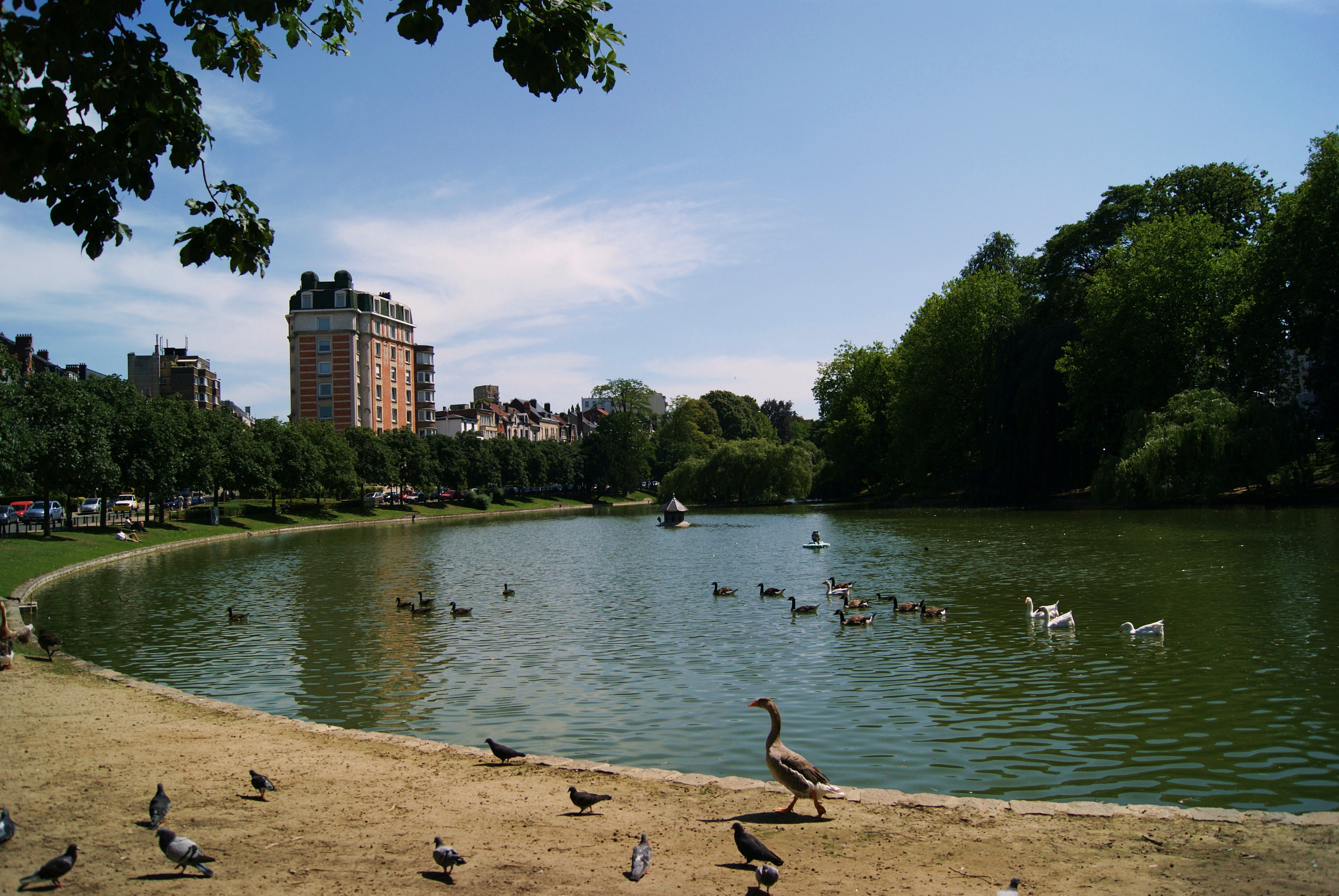
- A view of the Ixelles Ponds
- Interactive map of Ixelles Ponds
- Type: Public park
- Location: Ixelles, Brussels-Capital Region, Belgium
- Coordinates: 50°49′25″N 4°22′24″E
- Open: Open year-round

The Ixelles Ponds (French: Étangs d'Ixelles, pronounced [etɑ̃ diksɛl]) or Elsene Ponds (Dutch: Vijvers van Elsene, pronounced [ˈvɛi̯vərs fɑɱ ˈɛlsənə]) are two freshwater ponds in the Brussels municipality of Ixelles, Belgium. The ponds we can see today are those spared by a 19th-century campaign of drying the wetlands of the Maelbeek valley between La Cambre Abbey and the Place Eugène Flagey/Eugène Flageyplein.

The two long and narrow ponds, whose total lengths are approximately 700 metres (2,300 ft), and widths are approximately 50 metres (160 ft), are aligned on a roughly North–South axis and are separated by a narrow strip of land. With the surrounding park, the Ixelles Ponds are the tip of a long strip of almost uninterrupted greenery reaching all the way from the Sonian Forest deep into Brussels' urban tissue.

The ponds are a popular recreation area for local residents pertaining to the Belgian upper-crust. However, in the late 1990s, the water was polluted with cyanobacteria. This is still the case with the boating lake in the nearby Bois de la Cambre/Ter Kamerenbos where signs are posted at regular intervals, warning of a risk of botulism. Fishing is allowed in the ponds on Wednesdays, Sundays and public holidays.

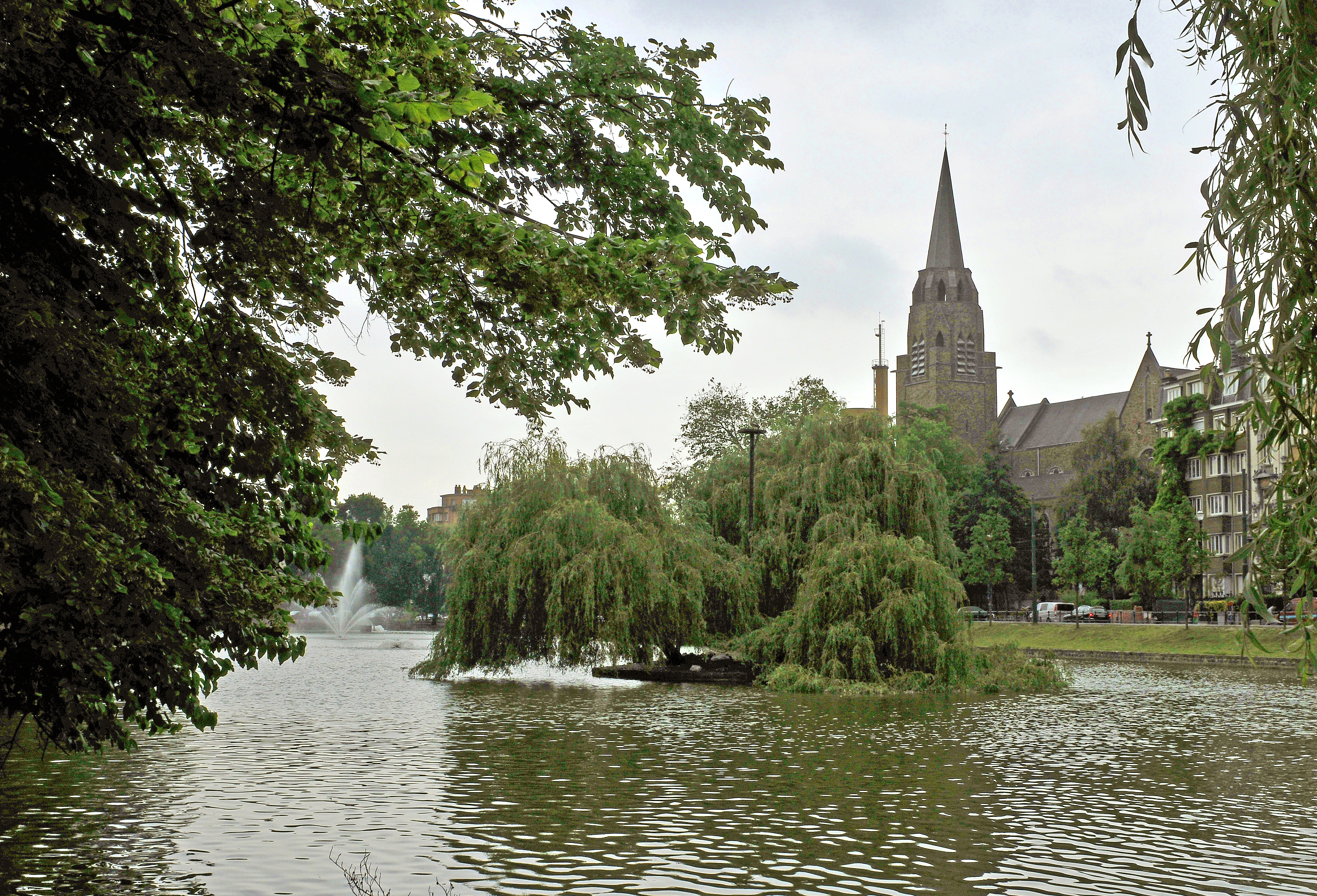
Church of the Holy Cross on the eastern shore of the north pond

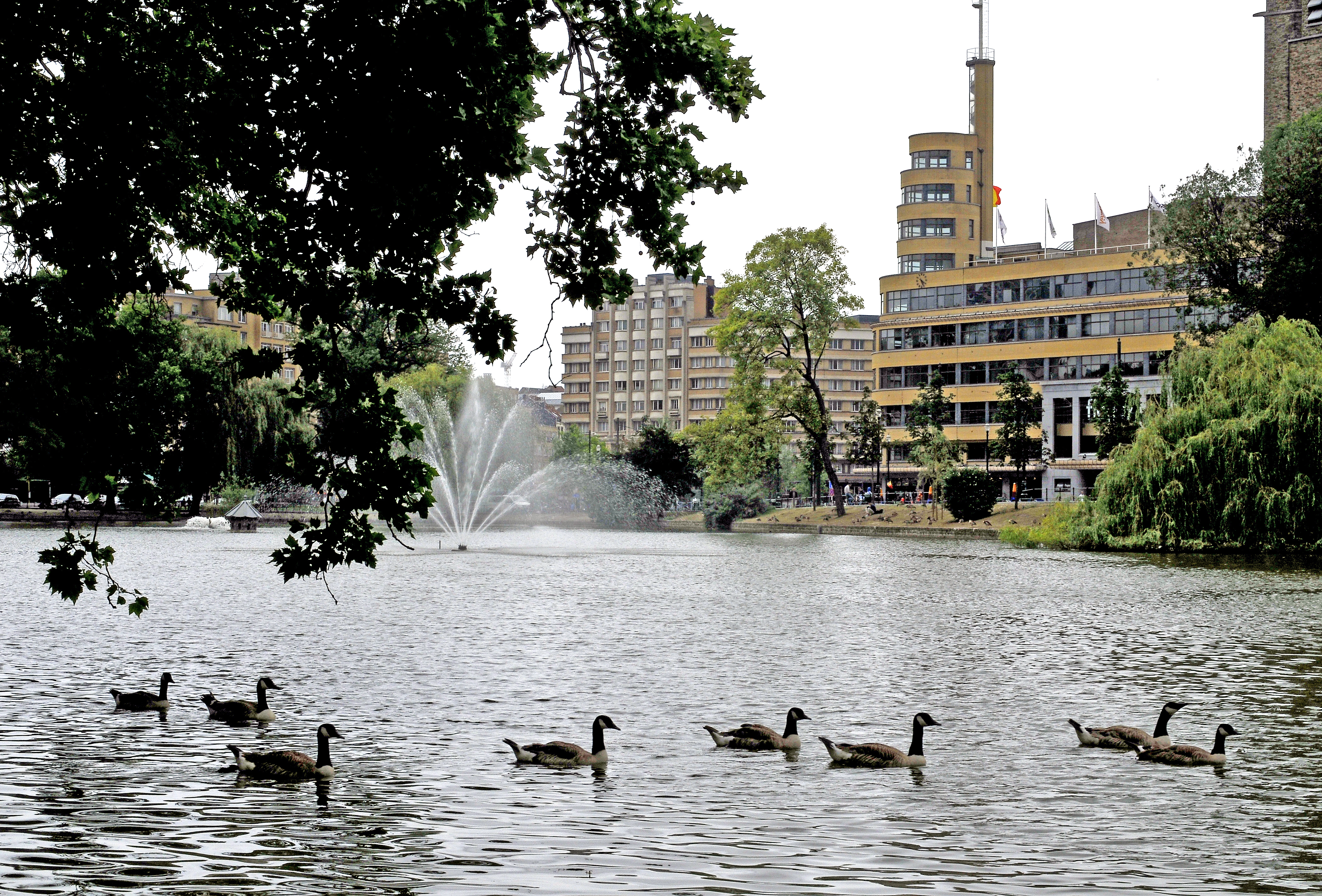
North pond with the Place Eugène Flagey/Eugène Flageyplein in the background

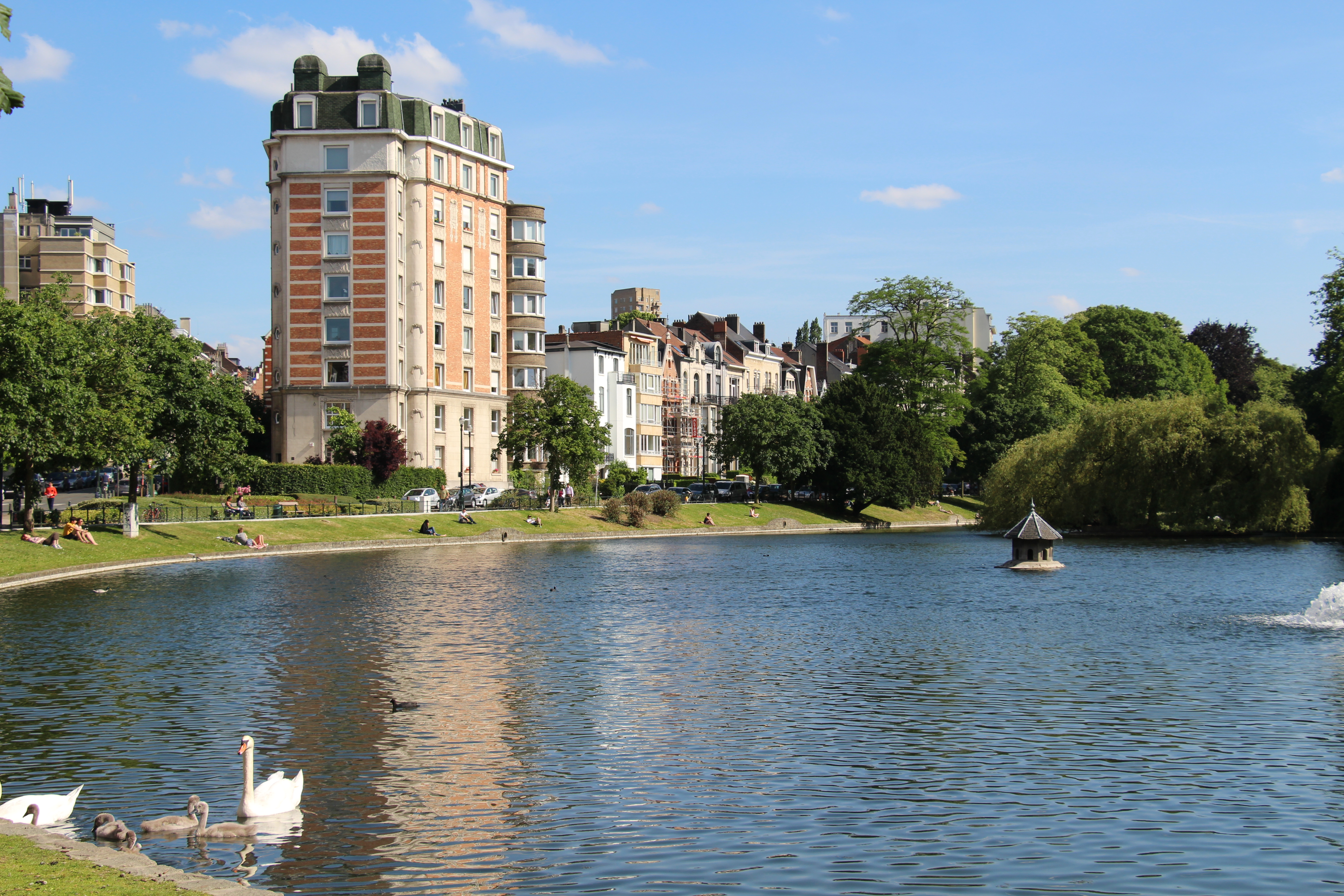
South pond, facing south

== See also ==
- List of parks and gardens in Brussels
- Résidence de la Cambre
- History of Brussels
- Belgium in the long nineteenth century
