= Ixelles =

Municipality of the Brussels-Capital Region, Belgium

Ixelles: Ixelles (French); Elsene (Dutch)
- Municipality
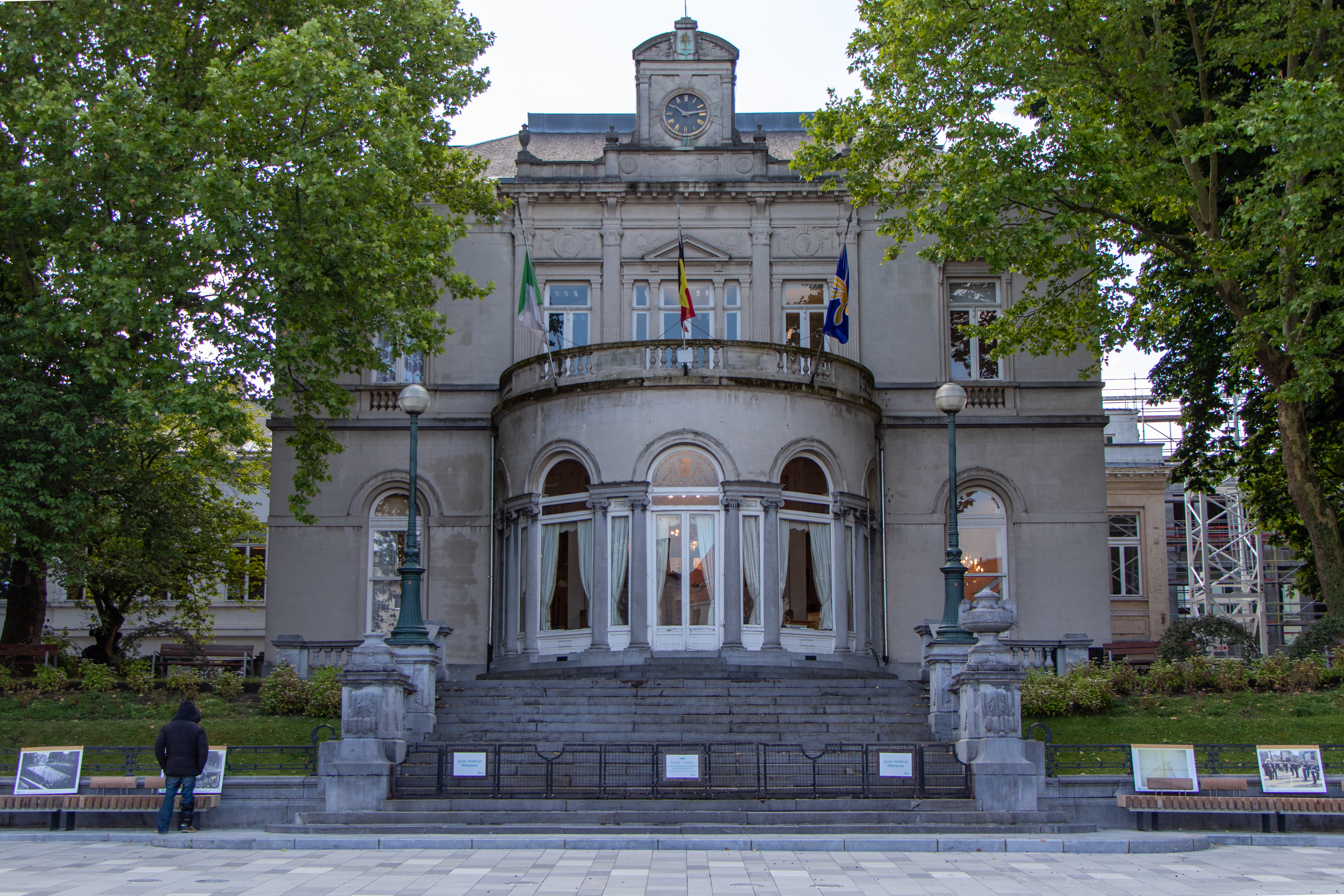
- Ixelles' Municipal Hall seen from the Place Fernand Cocq/Fernand Cocqplein

- Flag Coat of arms

- Ixelles municipality in the Brussels Capital Region
- Interactive map of Ixelles
- Location in Belgium
- Coordinates: 50°50′N 04°22′E
- Country: Belgium
- Community: Flemish Community; French Community
- Region: Brussels-Capital
- Arrondissement: Brussels-Capital

Government
  - Mayor: Romain De Reusme (PS)
  - Governing parties: PS - Vooruit / MR & VLD avec vous / Les Engagés - Objectif XL

Area
  - Total: 6.41 km^{2} (2.47 sq mi)

Population (2020-01-01)
  - Total: 87,632
  - Density: 13,700/km^{2} (35,400/sq mi)
- Postal codes: 1050
- NIS code: 21009
- Area codes: 02
- Website: www.ixelles.be (in French) www.elsene.be (in Dutch)

Ixelles (French, pronounced [iksɛl]) or Elsene (Dutch, pronounced [ˈɛlsənə]) is one of the 19 municipalities of the Brussels-Capital Region, Belgium. Located to the south-east of Brussels' city centre, it is geographically bisected by the City of Brussels. It is also bordered by the municipalities of Auderghem, Etterbeek, Forest, Uccle, Saint-Gilles and Watermael-Boitsfort.

As of 1 January 2023, the municipality had a population of 88,521 inhabitants. The total area is 6.41 km^{2} (2.47 sq mi), which gives a population density of 13,807/km^{2} (35,760/sq mi). Like all municipalities in Brussels, it is officially bilingual (French–Dutch). It is generally considered an affluent area of the region, and is particularly noted for its communities of European and Congolese immigrants.

== Geography ==
Ixelles is located in the south-east of Brussels and is divided into two parts by the Avenue Louise/Louizalaan, which is part of the City of Brussels. The municipality's smaller western part includes the Rue du Bailli/Baljuwstraat and extends roughly from the Avenue Louise to the Avenue Brugmann/Brugmannlaan, whilst its larger eastern part includes campuses of Brussels' two leading universities—the French-speaking Université libre de Bruxelles (ULB) and the Dutch-speaking Vrije Universiteit Brussel (VUB)—along with the Place Eugène Flagey/Eugène Flageyplein. The Bois de la Cambre/Ter Kamerenbos is located just south of Ixelles.

The construction of the Avenue Louise was commissioned in 1847 as a monumental avenue bordered by chestnut trees that would allow easy access from Brussels' city centre to the popular recreational area of the Bois de la Cambre. It was also to be the first Haussmann-esque artery of the city. Originally, fierce resistance to the project was put up by the town of Ixelles—then, as now, a separate municipality (local authority) from the City of Brussels—through whose territory the avenue was to run. After years of fruitless negotiations, Brussels finally annexed the narrow band of land needed for the avenue, in addition to the Bois de la Cambre itself, in 1864. That decision accounts for the unusual shape of today's City of Brussels and for the separation of Ixelles into two separate areas.

=== Climate ===
Climate data for Ixelles (1991−2020 normals)
| Month | Jan | Feb | Mar | Apr | May | Jun | Jul | Aug | Sep | Oct | Nov | Dec | Year |
|---|---|---|---|---|---|---|---|---|---|---|---|---|---|
| Mean daily maximum °C (°F) | 6.1 (43.0) | 7.1 (44.8) | 10.8 (51.4) | 15.0 (59.0) | 18.5 (65.3) | 21.3 (70.3) | 23.4 (74.1) | 23.1 (73.6) | 19.5 (67.1) | 14.8 (58.6) | 9.9 (49.8) | 6.5 (43.7) | 14.7 (58.5) |
| Daily mean °C (°F) | 3.6 (38.5) | 4.1 (39.4) | 7.0 (44.6) | 10.3 (50.5) | 13.8 (56.8) | 16.7 (62.1) | 18.8 (65.8) | 18.4 (65.1) | 15.2 (59.4) | 11.3 (52.3) | 7.2 (45.0) | 4.2 (39.6) | 10.9 (51.6) |
| Mean daily minimum °C (°F) | 1.2 (34.2) | 1.1 (34.0) | 3.2 (37.8) | 5.6 (42.1) | 9.2 (48.6) | 12.1 (53.8) | 14.2 (57.6) | 13.8 (56.8) | 10.9 (51.6) | 7.8 (46.0) | 4.4 (39.9) | 1.9 (35.4) | 7.1 (44.8) |
| Average precipitation mm (inches) | 74.8 (2.94) | 64.0 (2.52) | 57.9 (2.28) | 46.0 (1.81) | 59.5 (2.34) | 70.2 (2.76) | 75.1 (2.96) | 85.4 (3.36) | 64.3 (2.53) | 66.9 (2.63) | 75.8 (2.98) | 89.5 (3.52) | 829.5 (32.66) |
| Average precipitation days (≥ 1.0 mm) | 13.0 | 11.8 | 11.0 | 9.1 | 9.9 | 10.2 | 10.4 | 10.3 | 9.7 | 10.8 | 12.4 | 14.3 | 132.9 |
| Mean monthly sunshine hours | 59 | 73 | 126 | 174 | 201 | 203 | 207 | 195 | 155 | 113 | 66 | 49 | 1,621 |
Source: Royal Meteorological Institute

== History ==
=== Medieval origins ===
The placename was first mentioned in 1210 as Elsela, from the Old Dutch Else(n)lo, meaning alder woods. The origins of the village date from the foundation of La Cambre Abbey. Hendrik I, Duke of Brabant, donated the Pennebeke domain (Note: Pennebeek was the original name of the Maelbeek spring.) to the Cistercian nun Gisela in 1201. She in turn founded the abbey, and in 1210, acquired property on which the duke ordered the construction of a mill. The marshlands around the abbey were later drained and sanitised, which resulted in four springs which served as a source of fish for the abbey's inhabitants and the neighbouring hamlets. The abbey was located near the springs of the Maelbeek stream in the Sonian Forest, the remnant of which closest to Brussels became known as the Bois de la Cambre/Ter Kamerenbos in the 19th century. The abbey was recognised by Jan III van Bethune, the Bishop of Cambrai in 1202, soon after its foundation. The saints Boniface of Brussels and Alice of Schaerbeek were two of its most famous residents in the 13th century.

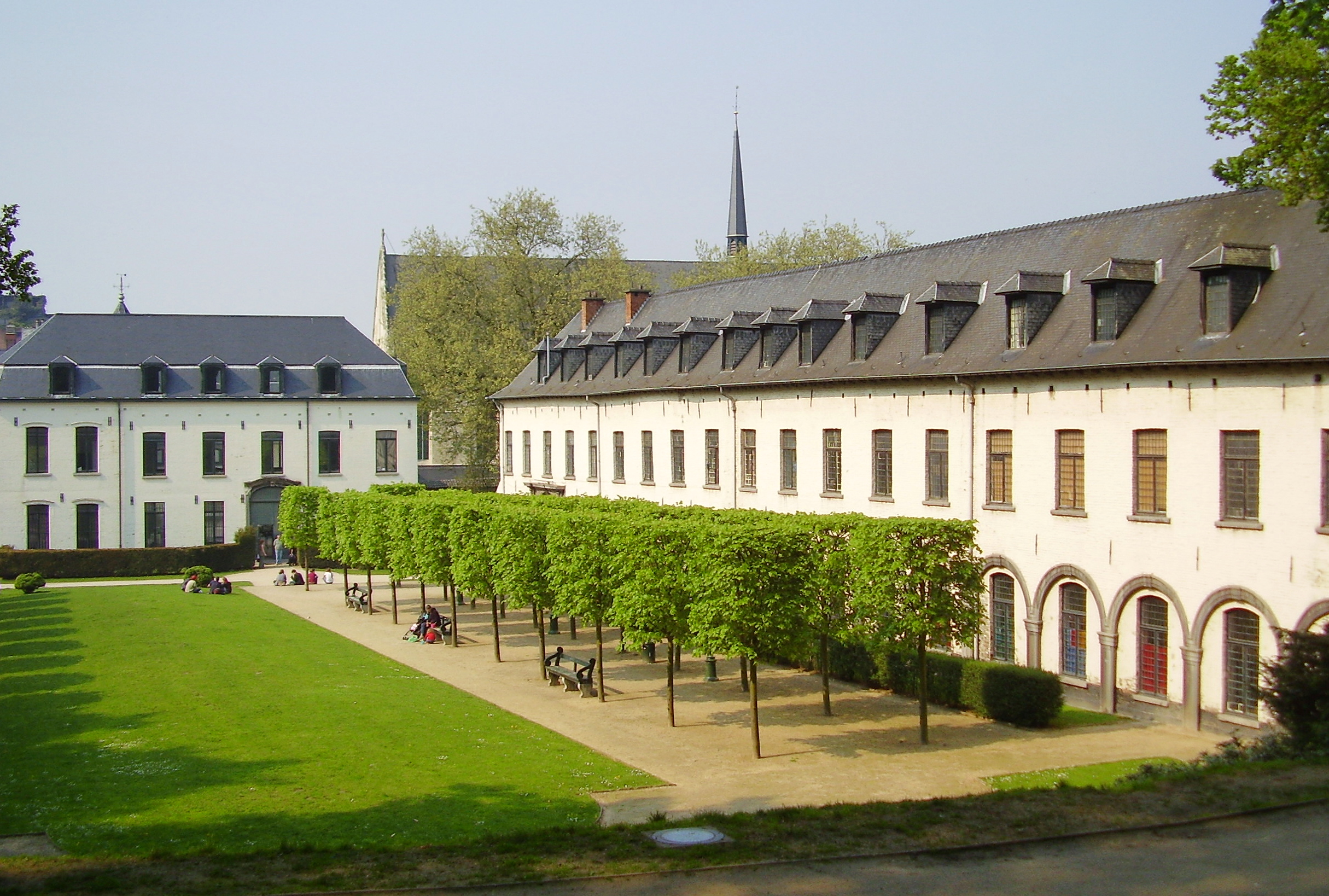
La Cambre Abbey, founded in 1201

Around 1300, during the reign of John II, Duke of Brabant, a hostel was built near the abbey to provide meals to the wood bearers working in the forest. Soon, a hamlet and a couple of chapels were built, including the Church of the Holy Cross, also inaugurated by the Bishop of Cambrai and dedicated to Mary and the Holy Cross in 1459. (Note: The Bishop of Cambrai is said to have brought two pieces of the original cross with him.) Initially, these hamlets and provisions were constructed for the labourers who helped drain and sanitise the marshlands. At that time, part of Ixelles was a dependence of Brussels; the other part was the property of the local lord.

=== Before the Revolution ===
In 1478, the wars between King Louis XI of France and Maximilian I, Holy Roman Emperor, brought devastation to the abbey and the surrounding areas. In 1585, during the period of the Habsburg Netherlands, the Spanish burned down most of the buildings to prevent them from being used as a refuge by Calvinists. The abbey was restored in time for the Joyous Entry of the Archdukes Albert and Isabella in 1599. Further manors and castles (Ermitage, Ten Bosch and Ixelles, for example) were built in Ixelles in the 16th century, gradually transforming the hamlet into a full-fledged village.

Thanks to the Maelbeek springs and the purity of its waters, a brewing industry became active in the area. It started inside the abbey, but by the 16th century, had expanded beyond its walls. Due to the liberalisation of beer manufacturing by the Council of Brabant in 1602, the industry grew, which resulted in a lively scene by the banks of the spring. By the 17th and 18th centuries, around 20 breweries-cabarets had settled in Ixelles, among which Saint-Hubert, De Sterre and L'Italie.

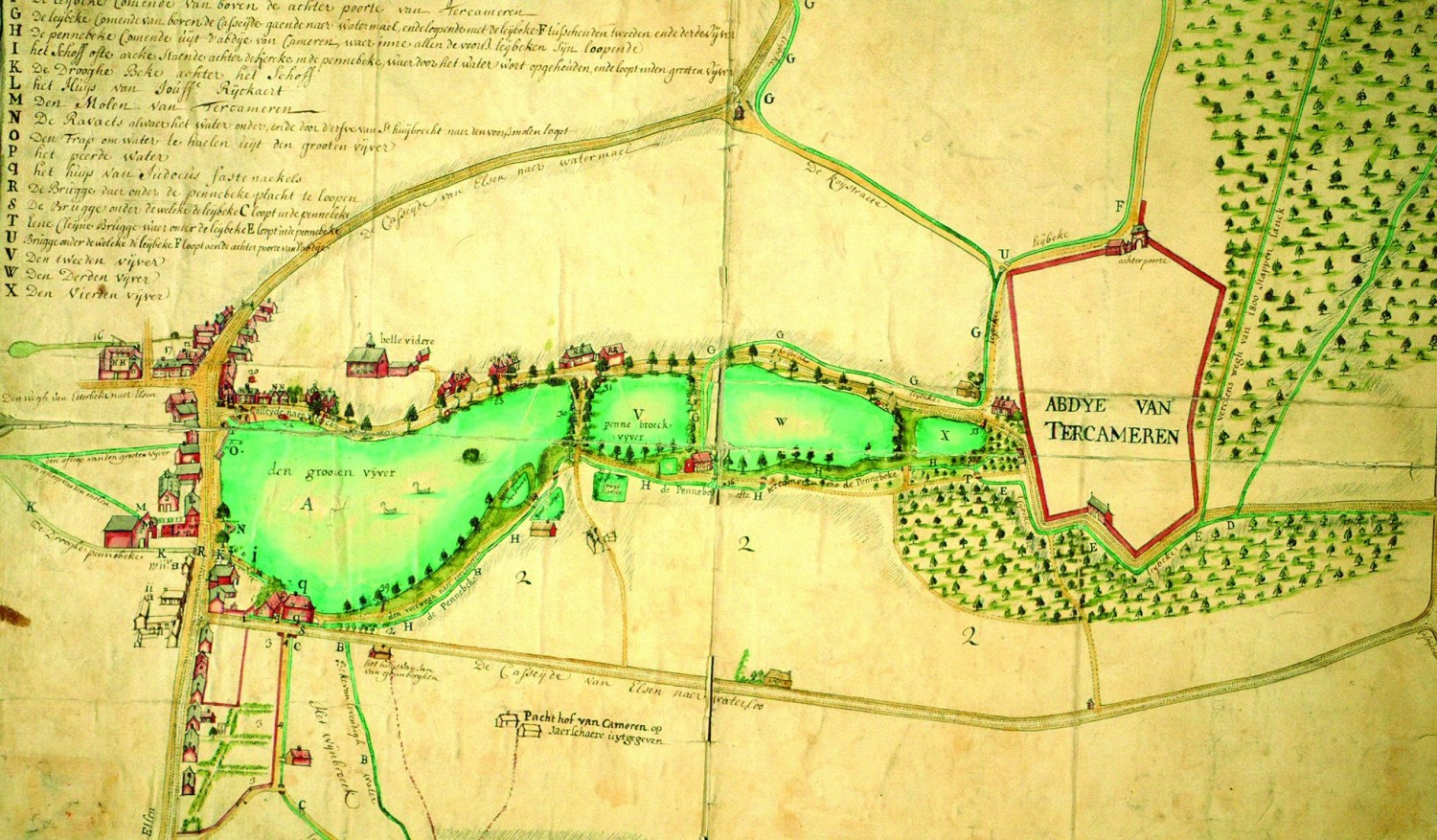
A 17th-century drawn map of the four lakes of Ixelles. Left are a collection of buildings including the mill; right is the Abdye van Tercameren (La Cambre Abbey).

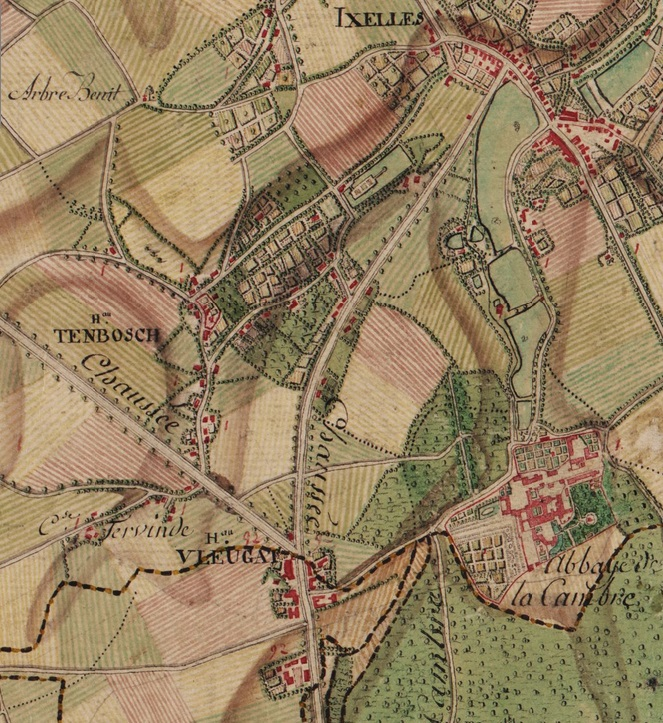
The village of Ixelles marked on the 18th-century Ferraris map

=== Independent municipality ===
In 1795, like many other towns surrounding Brussels, Ixelles was proclaimed a separate municipality by the French regime after the Revolution. The municipalities of Neder-Elsene ("Lower Ixelles", where the abbey is located), Opper-Elsene ("Upper Ixelles", a Brussels suburb), Boondaal, Tenbos, and Solbos, all became part of Ixelles. Moreover, the abbey was stripped of its religious functions, becoming among others a cotton manufacture, a farm, a military school, and a hospital. Many of the medieval gates of Brussels that lined what is now the Small Ring (Brussels' inner ring road) were taken down and more streets were built to accommodate the migration towards the suburbs. Ixelles' population grew nearly one-hundredfold, from 677 in 1813 to more than 58,000 in 1900. With this intense growth also came the Francisation of the municipality.

At the end of the 19th century, some of the ponds were drained, leaving only the so-called Ixelles Ponds, and a new Church of the Holy Cross was built in 1860. The first trams appeared in 1884 and the first cinema in 1919. By then, Ixelles and the Avenue Louise had become one of the most fashionable areas of Brussels. Artists and celebrities moved in, leading to architectural novelties such as Art Nouveau and Art Deco.

== Matongé ==
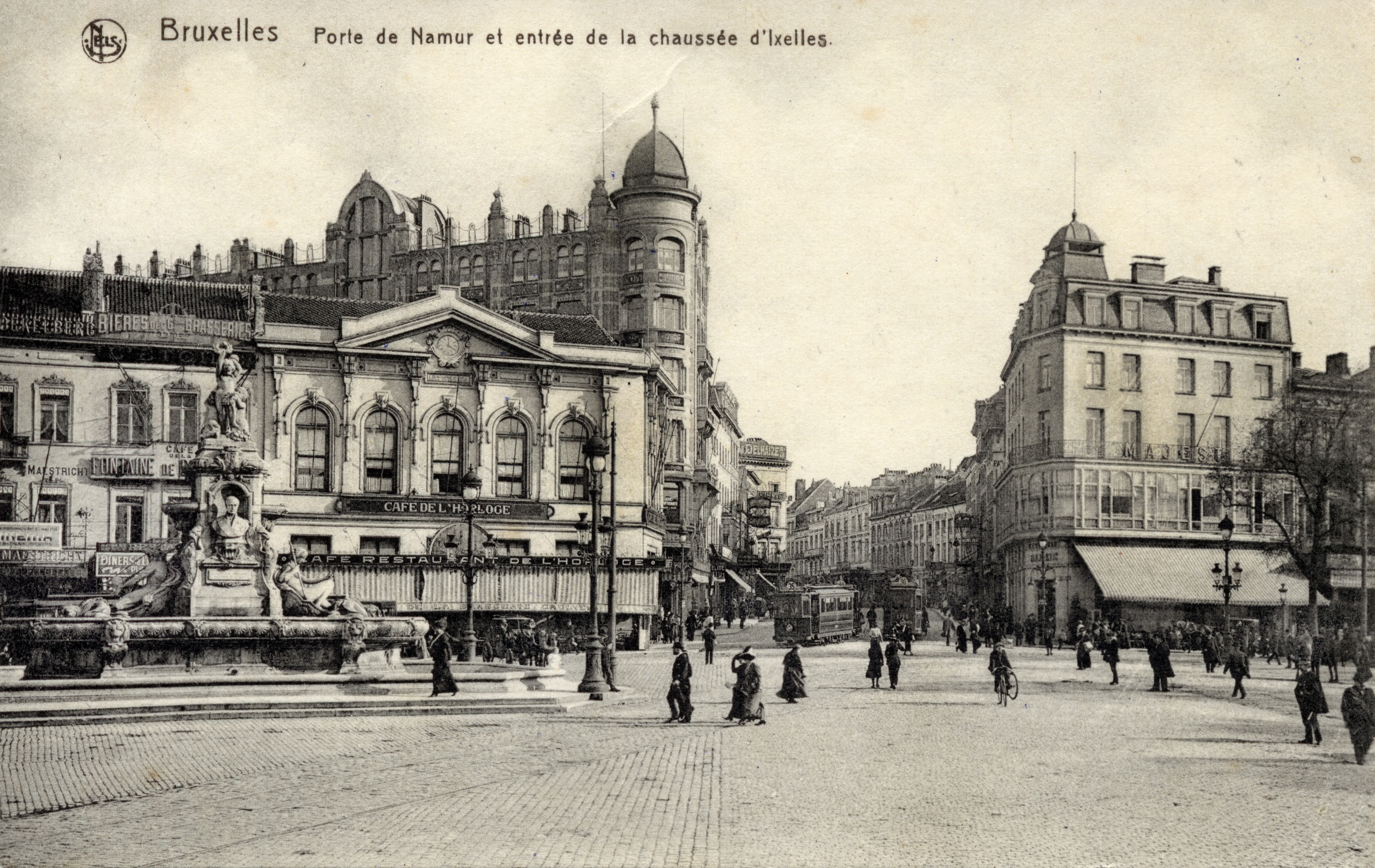
The Namur Gate and the Chaussée d'Ixelles/Elsensesteenweg, c. 1900

Ixelles is known throughout Belgium for its large community of people of Sub-Saharan African origin. This population is mainly concentrated near the Namur Gate and the Chaussée d'Ixelles/Elsensesteenweg, and the neighbourhood is nicknamed Matongé or Matongué after the marketplace and commercial district with the same name in Kalamu, Kinshasa (Democratic Republic of the Congo). The core of Matongé was formed in late 1950s by the foundation of Maisaf (an abbreviation of Maison Africaine, meaning "African House"), which served as a centre and residence for university students from the Belgian Congo. After Congolese independence in 1960, the district faced an influx of immigrants from the new state who shaped the neighbourhood in a style to resemble the original Matongé. During the 1960s and into the '70s, the area was a well known meeting place for students and diplomats from Zaire. At the time, they were known locally as Belgicains. Communities from other African countries (mainly from Rwanda, Burundi, Mali, Cameroon, and Senegal) are also present in the district.

Two shopping arcades, the Ixelles Gallery and the Namur Gate Gallery, are located in the heart of Matongé. In the galleries and the adjoining streets, a large number of specialised food shops and suppliers can be found. The area is renowned for its clothes, shoes and material shops, hairdressers and wigmakers, booksellers, jewellers and craft shops, making the area unmissable for many local and even international visitors. Over 45 different nationalities amongst the residents and shopkeepers can be counted, including most African countries. Statistically, many of the shopkeepers are not necessarily local residents. Amongst the visitors and window shoppers to Matongé are many who appreciate African fashion and lifestyle. The pedestrian street Rue Longue Vie/Lange-Levenstraat has many snack-bars where African food is sold. Most of these have been decorated by the Afro-European artist John Bush. Le Soleil d'Afrique has almost become his museum, with not only his original paintings on display, but also other painted surfaces and furniture.

Matongé also attained notoriety in the early 2000s due to gang violence perpetrated by African gangs, partly composed of exiled child soldiers, such as Black Démolition. It was the scene of race riots in January 2001. The district, with its more recent immigrant communities from Latin America, Pakistan, and India, along with African ones, is seen as a symbol of multiculturalism in Belgium. The local authorities, community groups and residents have more recently re-established the area as a safe place to visit, with a certain degree of success. As the area and property age, there is increased pressure and interest from property developers to expand the European Quarter on one side and the fashionable Avenue Louise on the other, with Matongé effectively sandwiched between the two.

Every year since 2001 at the end of June, a multicultural festival, Matongé en Couleurs, has been organised in the area. The date coincides with the celebration of Congolese independence. The film Juju Factory, released in 2006, was partly filmed in the area. The local television channel BX1 (formerly Télé Bruxelles) broadcasts a weekly magazine programme, Téle Matongé XL.

== Main sights ==
- The buildings of La Cambre Abbey, close to the territory of Ixelles, house a renowned school for the visual arts, the National Geographic Institute, and various parish functions.
- The Ixelles Ponds and Tenbosch Park are noted parks in the middle of the municipality.
- The Flagey Building, also known as the Radio House, a Streamline Moderne building on the Place Eugène Flagey, used to house the Belgian National Institute of Radio Broadcasting (INR/NIR).
- The Résidence de la Cambre, the first high-rise building in Brussels, on the Boulevard Général Jacques/Generaal Jacqueslaan, is another notable Art Deco building.
- Ixelles was a centre of Art Nouveau architecture in the first decades of the 20th century. Several Art Nouveau houses built by Victor Horta are listed as a UNESCO World Heritage Site, and some of them can be visited.
- The three Brussels universities—the Université libre de Bruxelles (ULB), Vrije Universiteit Brussel (VUB) and Saint-Louis University—have campuses in Ixelles. As a result, the south-eastern part of the municipality is home to a large number of students.
- Ixelles Cemetery is one of the most important cemeteries in the country as it contains the graves of a number of Belgian personalities. It was there, in 1891, that the French General Georges Boulanger, leader of the right-wing Boulangerists, committed suicide, on the tomb of his mistress, who had died a couple of months earlier.
- Ixelles also houses several interesting churches and museums, including the Museum of Ixelles, as well as the Meunier Museum, established in the residence where the artist lived part of his life.
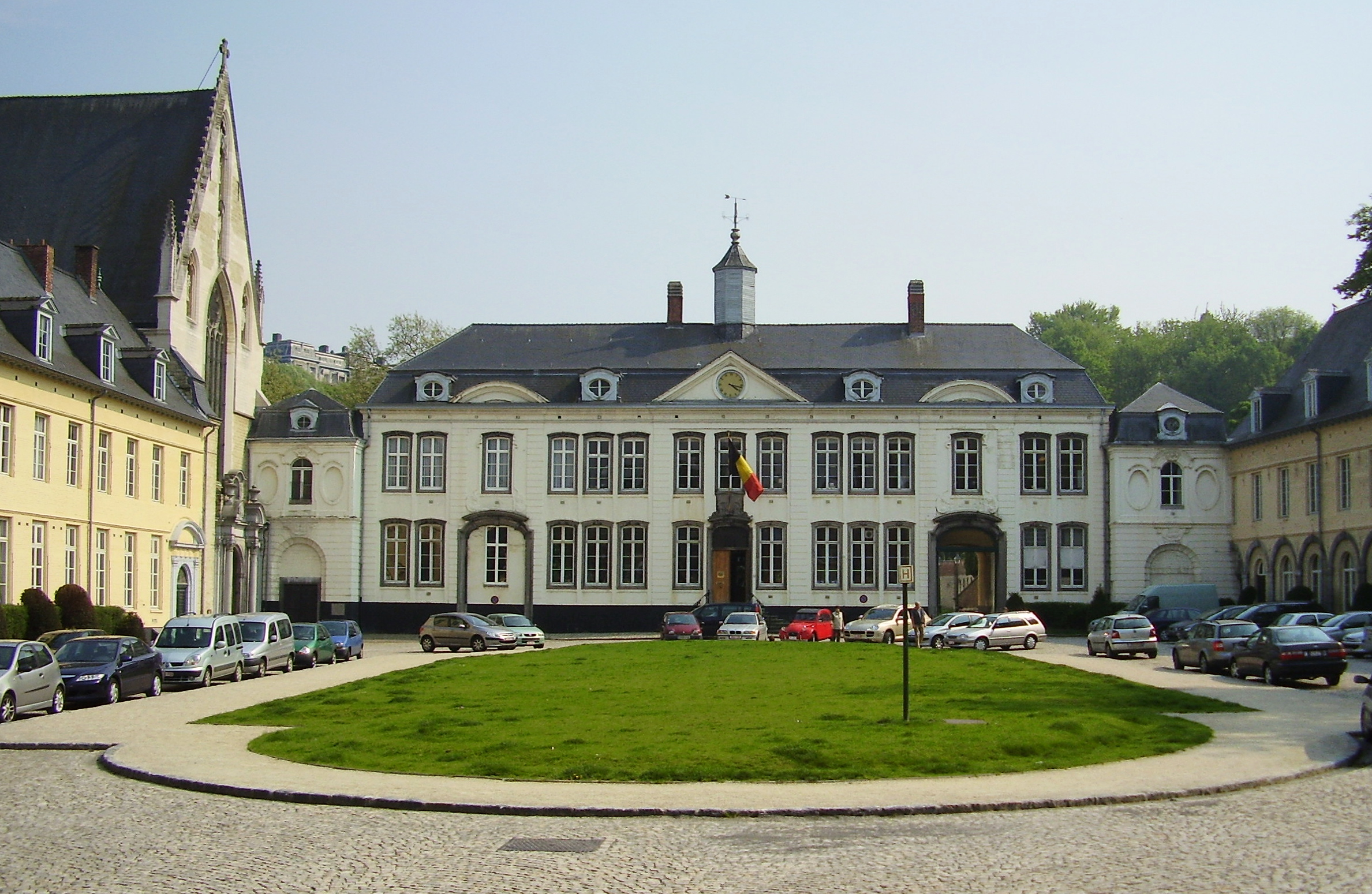
View from the cour d'honneur (main courtyard) of La Cambre Abbey, located in the City of Brussels close to Ixelles

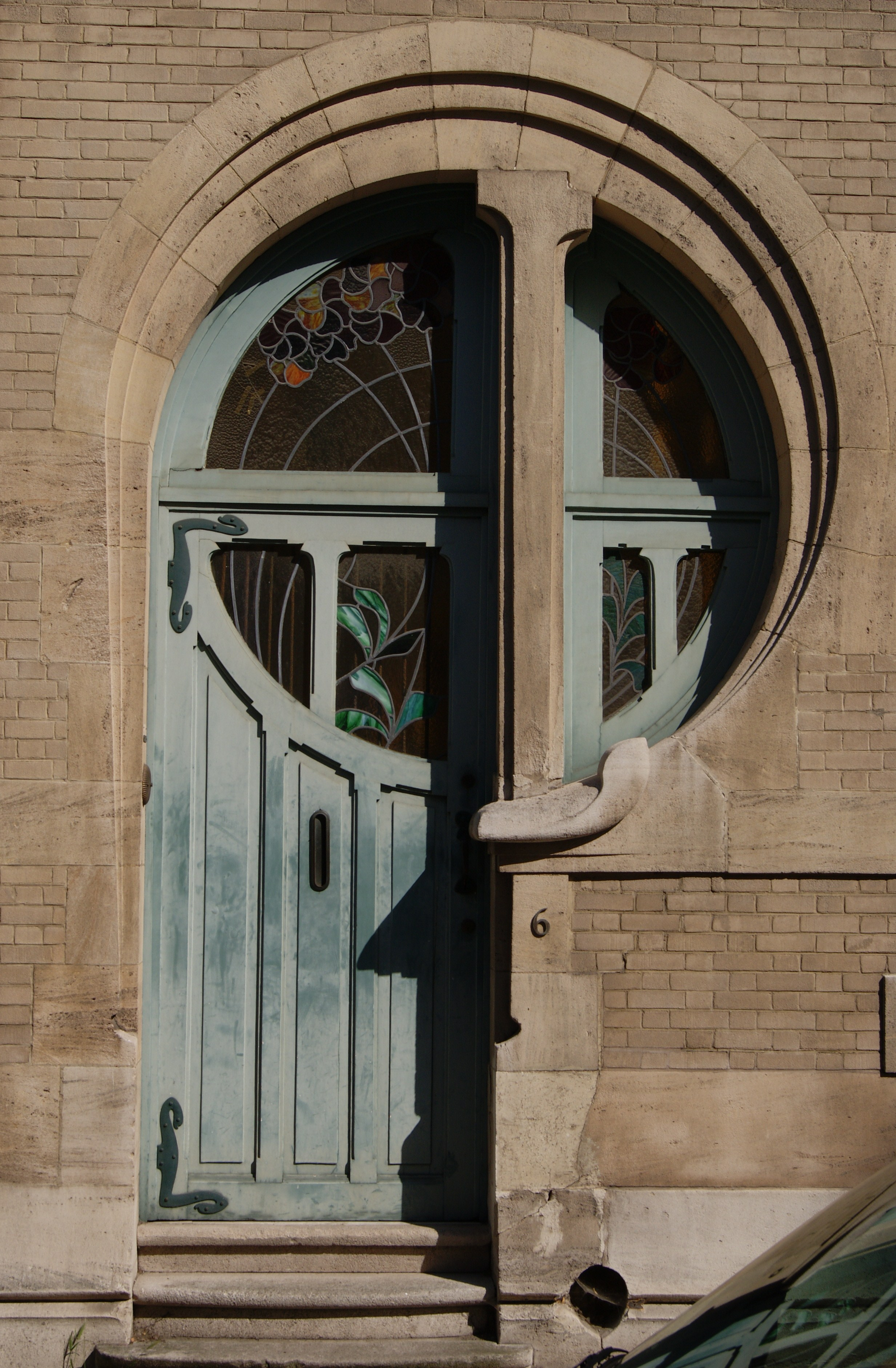
An Art Nouveau doorway in Ixelles, dating from 1902

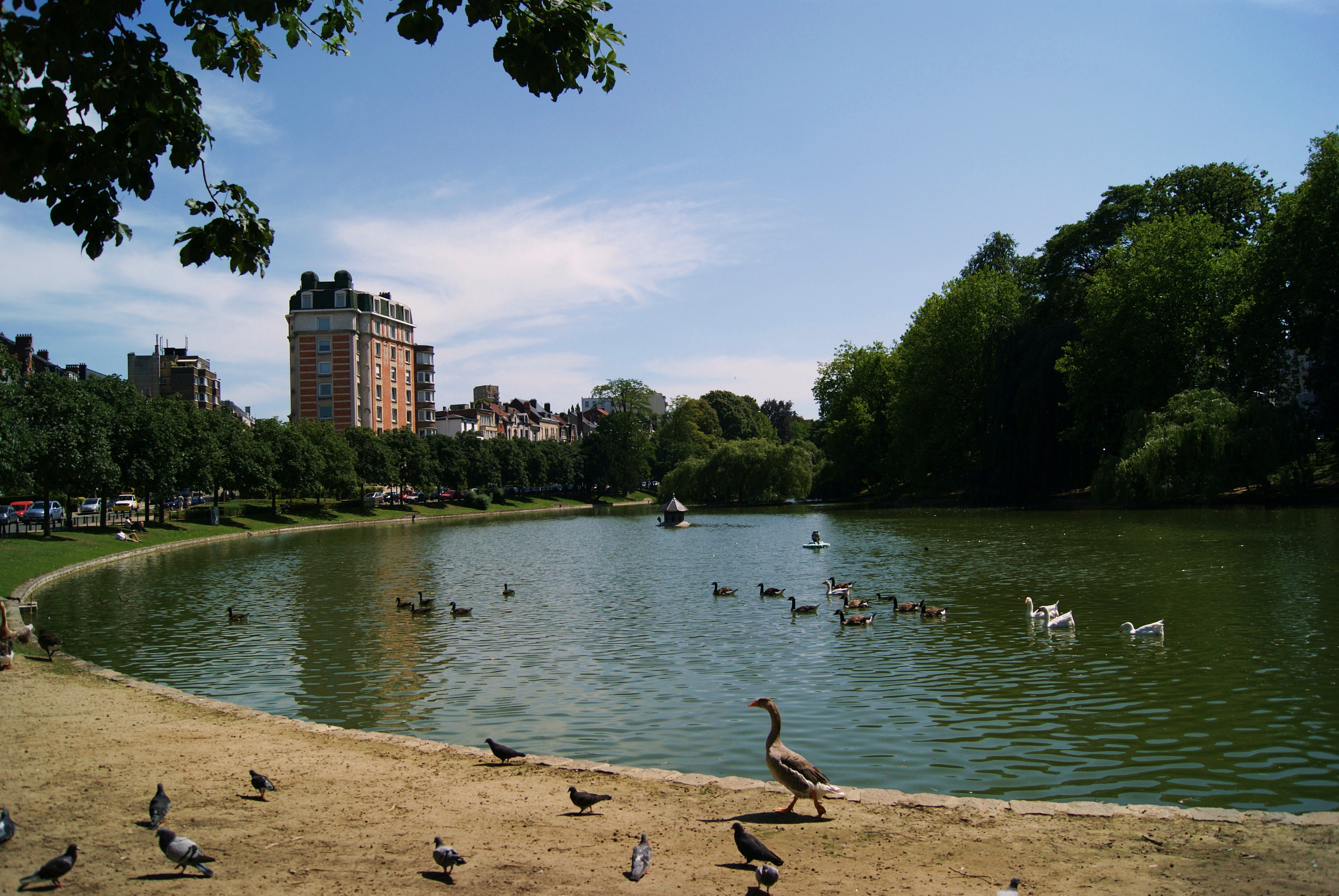
View of the Ixelles Ponds towards the Place Eugène Flagey/Eugène Flageyplein

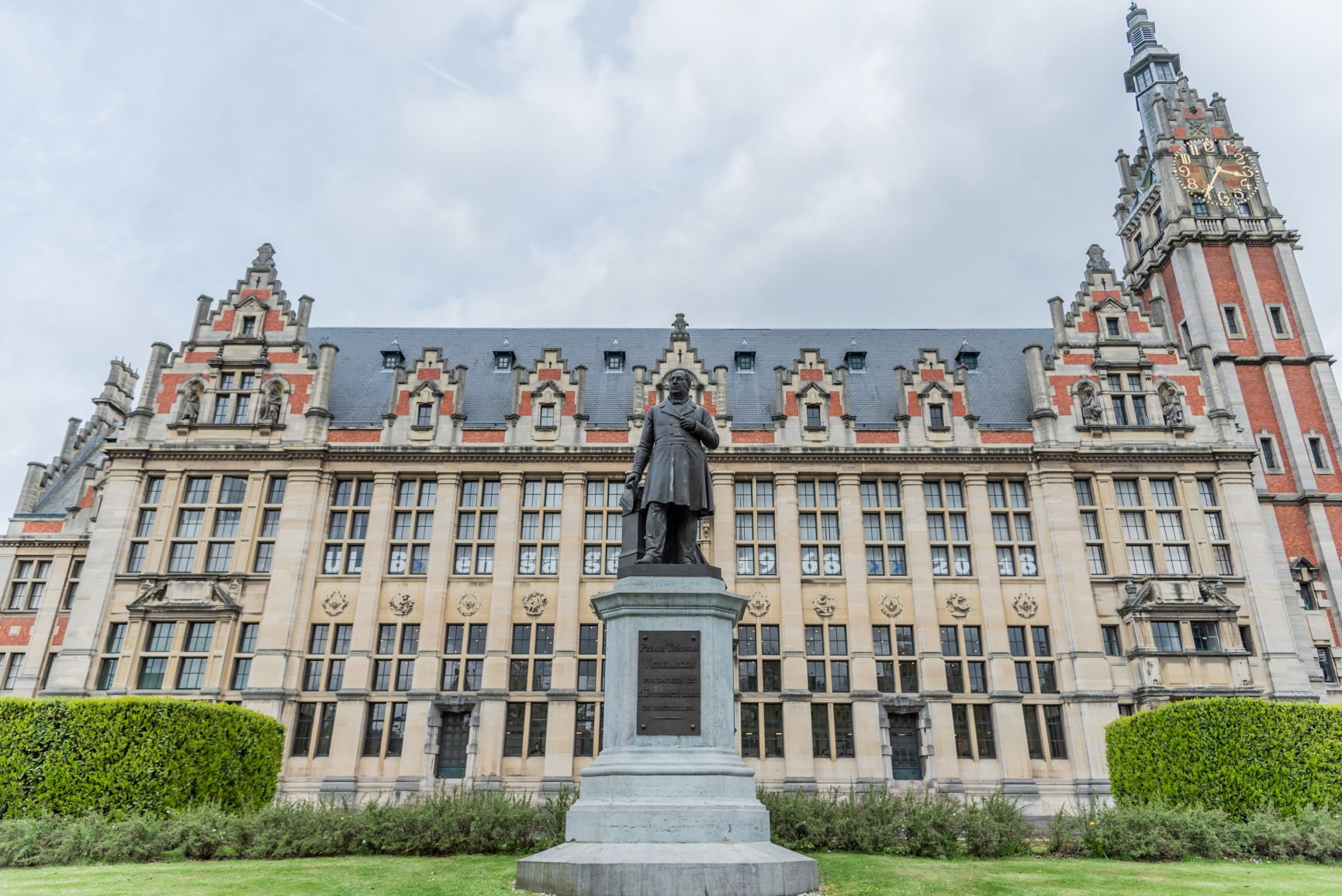
The main building on the Solbosch/Solbos campus of the Université libre de Bruxelles (ULB), located in the City of Brussels close to Ixelles

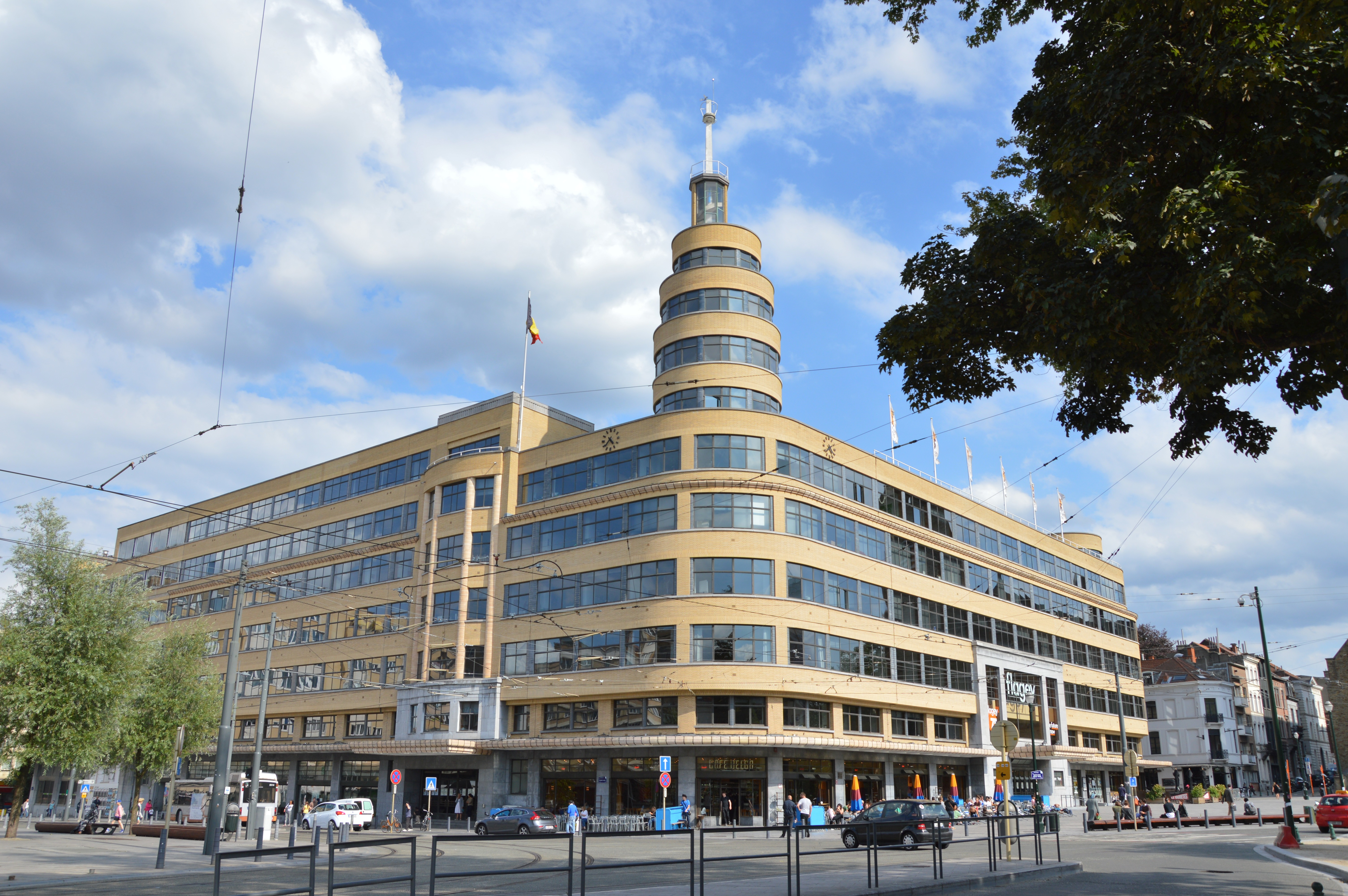
Flagey Building (or Radio House) on the Place Eugène Flagey

== Events ==
Several fairs are organised in Ixelles, including the Spring Fair on the Place Eugène Flagey, which takes place between the fourth and sixth Sunday after Easter, as well as the Boondael Fair at the end of July.

Brussels Universities Cyclocross is a cyclo-cross race that is regularly held in the adjacent campuses of the Université libre de Bruxelles (ULB) and the Vrije Universiteit Brussel (VUB), located in eastern Ixelles.

== Demographics ==
Migrant communities in Ixelles with over 1,000 people as of 1 January 2020:

| France | 11,470 |
| Italy | 4,504 |
| Spain | 2,540 |
| Portugal | 1,795 |
| Germany | 1,793 |
| Romania | 1,750 |
| Poland | 1,378 |
| United Kingdom | 1,188 |
| Morocco | 1,107 |
| Greece | 1,045 |

| Group of origin | Year | |
| Group of origin | 2023 | |
| Group of origin | Number | % |
|---|---|---|
| Belgians with Belgian background | 20,038 | 22.64% |
| Belgians with foreign background | 23,999 | 27.11% |
| Neighbouring country | 3,587 | 4.05% |
| EU27 (excluding neighbouring country) | 3,657 | 4.13% |
| Outside EU 27 | 16,755 | 18.93% |
| Non-Belgians | 44,484 | 50.25% |
| Neighbouring country | 15,519 | 17.53% |
| EU27 (excluding neighbouring country) | 16,208 | 18.31% |
| Outside EU 27 | 12,757 | 14.41% |
| Total | 88,521 | 100% |

== Politics ==
The current city council was elected in the October 2018 elections. The current mayor of Ixelles is Christos Doulkeridis, a member of Ecolo, who is in coalition on the municipal council with PS - sp.a.

Ixelles local election – 14 October 2018
Party
| Party | Votes | % | Swing (pp) | Elected 2018 | Change |
|---|---|---|---|---|---|
| Ecolo - Groen | 10,817 | 33.05 | ▲9.53 | 16 / 43 (37%) | ▲5 |
| MR - Open Vld | 8,364 | 25.55 | ▼3.54 | 12 / 43 (28%) | ▼3 |
| PS - sp.a | 6,190 | 18.91 | ▲2.30 | 9 / 43 (21%) | ▲1 |
| DéFI | 2,342 | 7.16 | ▼5.05 | 2 / 43 (5%) | ▼3 |
| PVDA-PTB | 2,049 | 6.26 | ▲4.44 | 2 / 43 (5%) | ▲2 |
| cdH - CD&V (Objective XL) | 1,817 | 5.55 | ▼3.86 | 2 / 43 (5%) | ▼2 |
| N-VA | 960 | 2.93 | ▲0.58 | 0 / 43 (0%) | - |
| Volt | 191 | 0.58 | New | 0 / 43 (0%) | - |

== International relations ==
=== Twin towns and sister cities ===
Ixelles is twinned with:

- Biarritz, France (since 1958)
- Kalamu, municipality in Kinshasa, Democratic Republic of the Congo (since 2003)
- Zababdeh, Palestine (since 2003)
- Kibbutz Megiddo, Israel (since 2012, suspended in July 2024)
- Lichtenberg, Germany

== Notable inhabitants ==
Born in Ixelles:

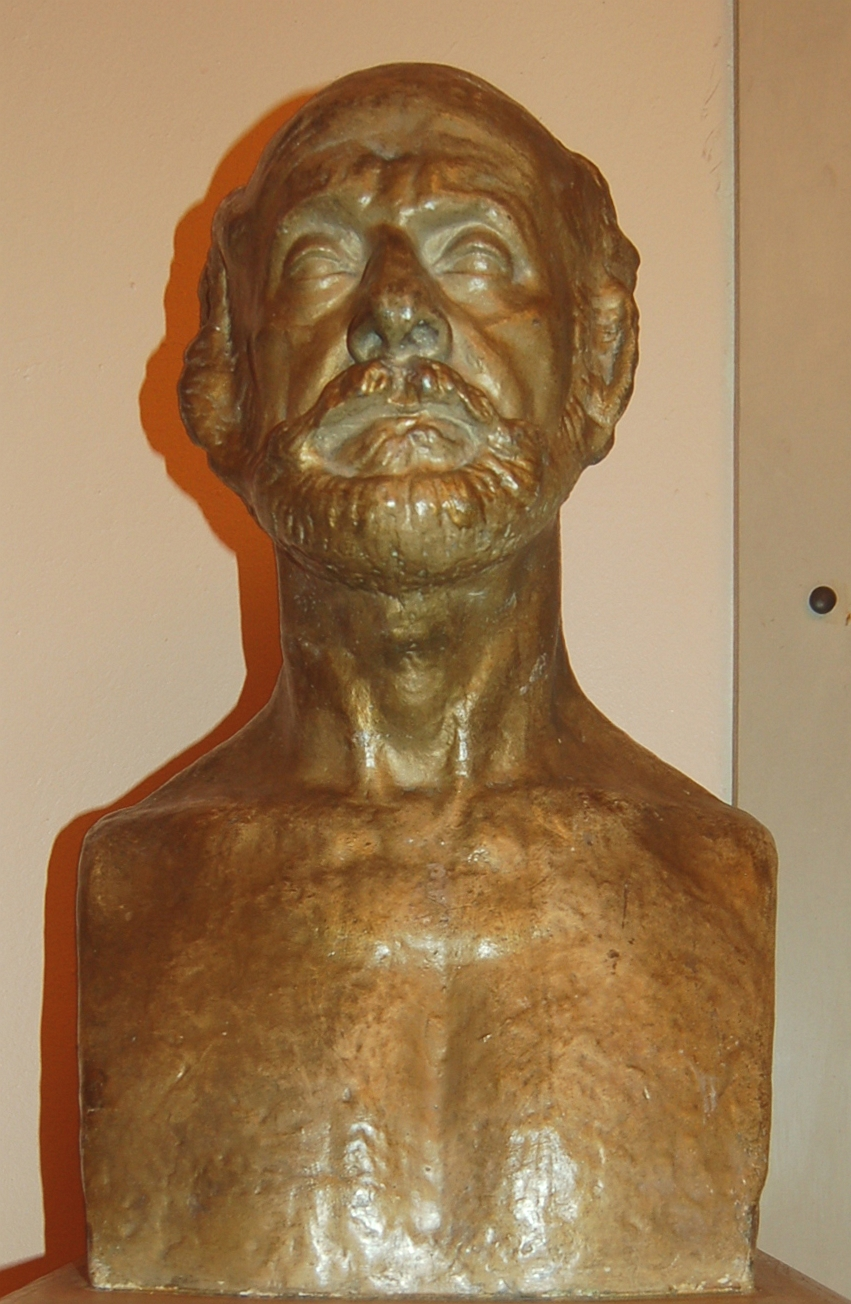
Bust of Auguste Perret

- Agnès Varda (1928-2019), film director
- Albert Crahay (1903–1991), soldier and commander of the Belgian battalion at the Battle of the Imjin River during the Korean War
- Anna Boch (1848–1936), impressionist painter and art collector
- Annemie Neyts (born 1944), politician and MEP
- Audrey Hepburn (1929–1993), British actress, model, and humanitarian
- Auguste Alfred Lucien Lameere (1864–1942), entomologist
- Auguste Perret (1874–1954), architect
- Boris Szulzinger (born 1945), film director and producer
- Camille Lemonnier (1844–1913), writer and poet
- Emile Vandervelde (1866–1938), statesman, socialist leader, Minister of Justice, and Minister of Foreign Affairs
- Frank Ntilikina (born 1998), professional basketball player
- Grand Jojo (1936–2021), singer-songwriter
- Michel Regnier, also known as Greg (1931–1999), comic book author
- Jacky Ickx (born 1945), racing driver
- Jaco Van Dormael (born 1957), screenwriter and film director
- Jacques Feyder (1885–1948), screenwriter and film director
- Jean-François van Boxmeer (born 1961), businessman, chairman and CEO of Heineken International
- Jules de Burlet (1844–1897), politician, senator, Interior Minister, Prime Minister, and Belgian ambassador to Portugal
- Julio Cortázar (1914–1984), novelist
- Kris Bosmans (born 1980), cyclist
- Leo Joseph Suenens (1904–1996), cardinal and Archbishop of Mechelen-Brussels
- Marc Dutroux (born 1956), convicted child molester and serial killer
- Marc Moulin (1942–2008), jazz and fusion musician, author
- Michel de Ghelderode (1898–1962), avant-garde dramatist
- Natacha Régnier (born 1974), actress
- Paul Hymans (1865–1941), politician and first President of the League of Nations
- Paul Saintenoy (1862–1952), architect, teacher, architectural historian, and writer
- Pierre Kolp (born 1969), composer
- Pierre Rapsat (1948–2002), singer-songwriter
- Rik Coolsaet (born 1951), academic
- Sophie Wilmès (born 1975), politician, Prime Minister, and Minister of Foreign Affairs
- Ursula von der Leyen (born 1958), German Federal Minister for Labour and Social Affairs, German Minister of Defence, and President of the European Commission
- Yannick Carrasco (born 1993), football player

Lived in Ixelles:

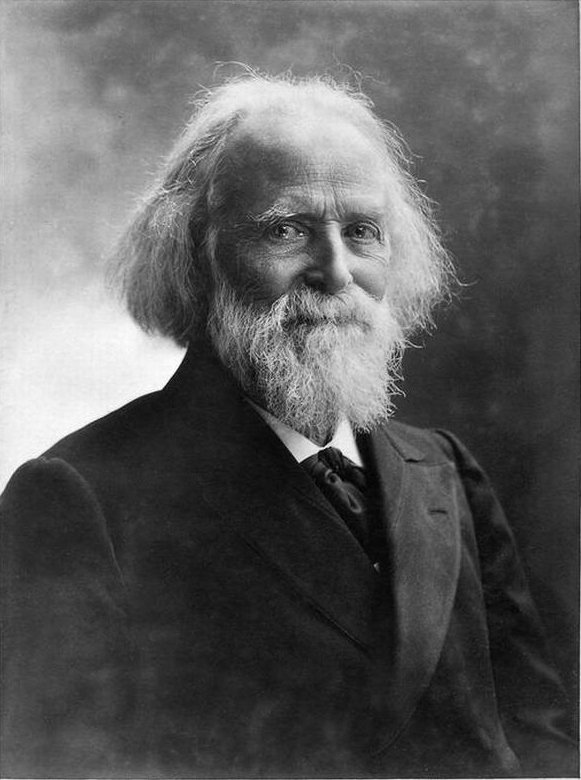
Élisée Reclus

- Anna Boch (1848–1936), artist and art collector, owner of the Villa Anna
- Antoine Wiertz (1806–1865), painter and sculptor
- August de Boeck (1865–1937), composer, organist, and music pedagogue
- Auguste Rodin (1840–1917), sculptor
- Charles de Coster (1827–1879), novelist
- Constantin Meunier (1831–1905), painter and sculptor
- Damso (born 1992), Belgian-Congolese rapper, singer, and songwriter
- Edith Cavell (1865–1915), British nurse and World War I martyr, ran a nursing school there from 1907.
- Elisée Reclus (1830–1905), geographer and anarchist
- Ernest Solvay (1838–1922), chemist, industrialist, and philanthropist
- Giacomo Puccini (1858–1924), Italian composer; lived and died at 1, avenue de la Couronne/Kroonlaan; a tablet with an inscription is visible on the building wall.
- Henriëtte Ronner-Knip (1821–1909), painter
- Jean-Baptiste Moens (1833–1908), philatelist and stamp dealer
- Jacky Ickx (born 1945), racing driver
- Johan Michiel Dautzenberg (1834–1878), writer
- Karl Marx (1818–1883), German philosopher, social theorist, political economist, and socialist revolutionary
- Maria Malibran (1808–1836), mezzo-soprano
- Naim Khader (1939–1981), representative of the Palestine Liberation Organization
- Neel Doff (1858–1942), writer
- Octave Maus (1856–1919), art critic, writer, and lawyer
- Pierre-Joseph Proudhon (1809–1865), anarchist thinker
- Vladimir Lenin (1870–1924), Russian revolutionary and first head of the Soviet Union
