= Tenbosch =

Neighbourhood in Brussels, Belgium

Tenbosch: Tenbosch (French); Tenbos (Dutch)
- Neighbourhood
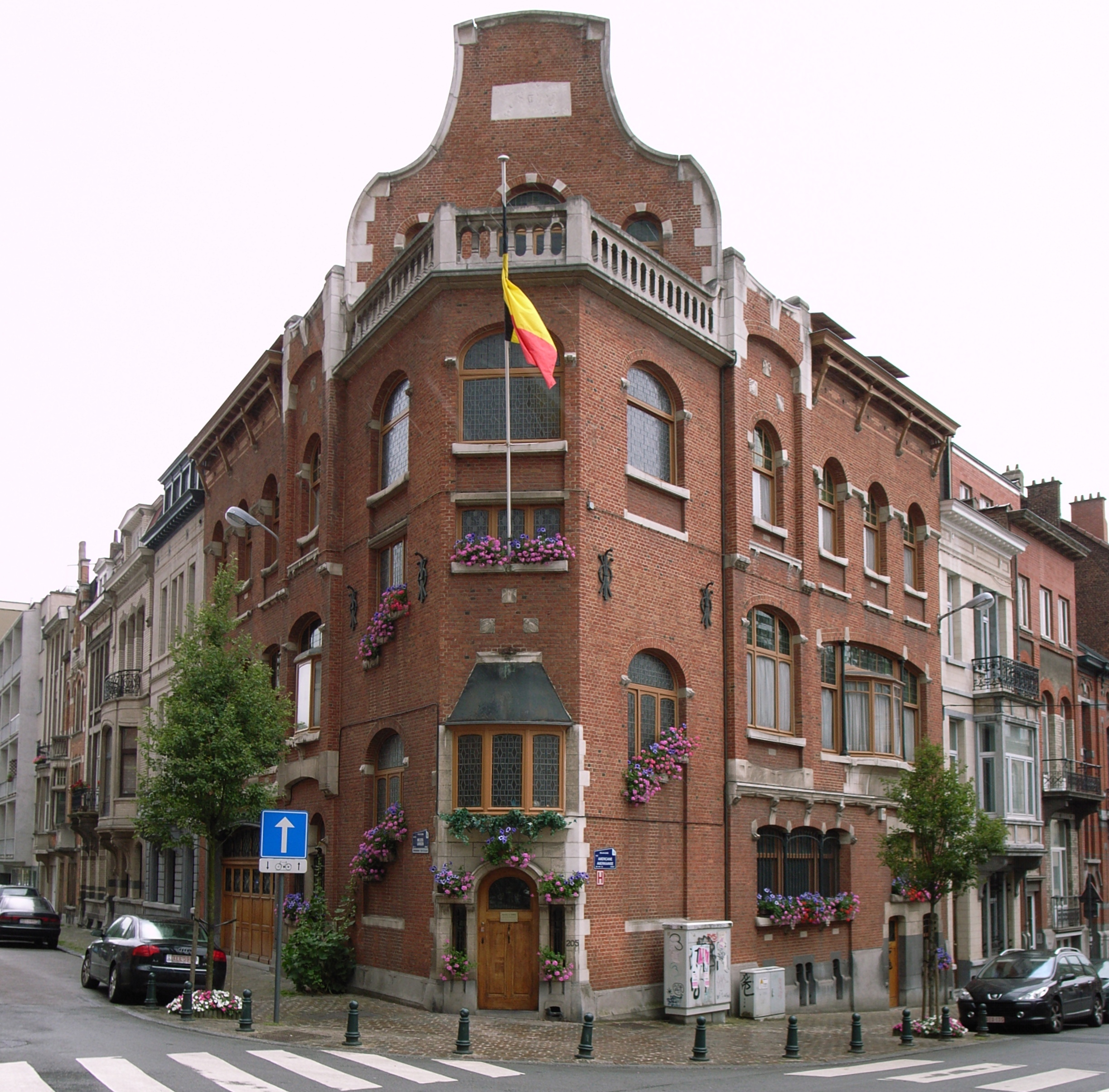
- House of the architect Adrien Blomme

- Location within Brussels Tenbosch (Belgium)
- Coordinates: 50°49′12.8395″N 4°21′47.1103″E
- Country: Belgium
- Region: Brussels-Capital Region
- Arrondissement: Brussels-Capital
- Municipality: Ixelles
- Time zone: UTC+1 (CET)
  - Summer (DST): UTC+2 (CEST)
- Postal code: 1050
- Area codes: 02

Tenbosch (French) or Tenbos (Dutch) is a district of Ixelles, a municipality of Brussels, Belgium. It is a western exclave of Ixelles, bordered by Saint-Gilles to the west and the southern expansion of Brussels with the Avenue Louise/Louizalaan to the east, alongside the neighbouring district of Berkendael/Berkendaal.

== History ==
=== Rural beginnings ===
Originally, Tenbosch was a rural hamlet. The Ferraris map from the 1770s shows it located in a valley between lower Ixelles to the north and Vleurgat and La Cambre Abbey to the south. Before urbanisation, this hilly area contained the hamlets of Ten Bosch and Berkendael/Berkendaal, with fields, paths, farmsteads, rural houses and country estates. Beyond the Chaussée de Vleurgat/Vleurgatse Steenweg lay the Poortbosch, the old wood of La Cambre Abbey, and the Sonian Forest.

During the late stages of the Ancien Régime under French control around 1795, the hamlet was incorporated into the newly formed municipality of Ixelles together with lower Ixelles, upper Ixelles and other hamlets.

=== 19th-century urbanisation ===
The transformation of the area began in 1860 with the construction of the Avenue Louise/Louizalaan, which cut through the landscape between Tenbosch and Ixelles. Between 1863 and 1866, the road inspector Victor Besme drew up the Plan général pour l'extension et l'embellissement de l'agglomération bruxelloise (transl. General plan for the expansion and beautification of Brussels' suburbs), which regulated the development of the residential districts of Tenbosch in 1864 and Berkendaal in 1902. These neighbourhoods occupy a large triangular area bounded by the Avenue Louise, the Chaussée de Charleroi/Charleroisesteenweg and the Chaussée de Waterloo/Waterloosesteenweg for Tenbosch, and by the Avenue Brugmann/Brugmannlaan and the Avenue Molière/Molièrelaan for Berkendaal. Developing the steep terrain required significant earthworks, often carried out by the landowners themselves, who would then sell the plots or donate street beds to the municipality.

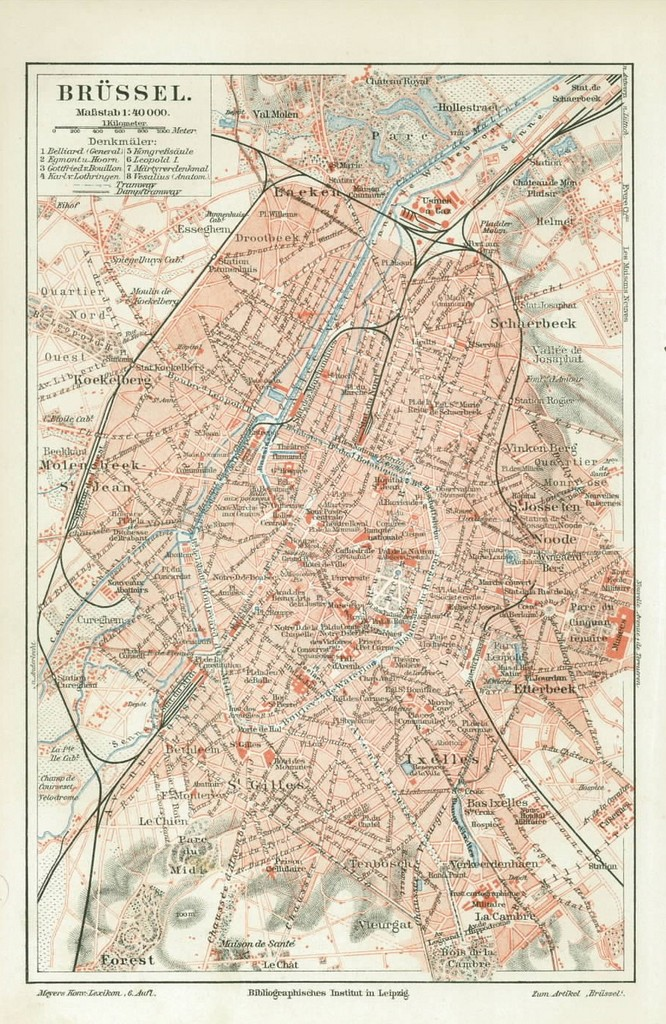
Map of Brussels in 1907. In the south, urbanisation reaches Tenbosch.

The street layout for Tenbosch followed Besme's Plan général d'alignement pour l'ouverture des rues et places sur le territoire compris entre l'avenue du bois de la Cambre et les chaussées de Waterloo et de Charleroi (transl. General alignment plan for the opening of streets and squares in the area between the Avenue du Bois de la Cambre and the Chaussées de Waterloo and Charleroi) of 1864, which combined a grid of square blocks along the Rue de Livourne/Livornostraat with a fan-shaped design radiating from the Place Albert Leemans/Albert Leemansplein. Work on the roads began in the 1870s, with the felling of the "sacred tree" in 1870 to make way for the Rue Defacqz/Defacqzstraat. Once the infrastructure was completed, the district was built between about 1875 and 1905, entirely through private initiative.

From the outset, Besme planned for a Catholic church in the heart of the neighbourhood. After various proposed sites, the Holy Trinity Church was built, supported by Baron Victor d'Huart and the developer Georges Brugmann. Elevated to parish status in 1886, it soon proved too small, and in 1893 the government approved the construction of a new church at the end of the Rue du Bailli/Baljuwstraat, incorporating the Baroque façade of the former Temple of the Augustinians at the Place de Brouckère/De Brouckèreplein. This was accompanied by an urban plan to extend the Rue du Bailli, create a circular forecourt and add a side street known as the Rue du Tabellion/Notarisstraat. The original church was deconsecrated in 1896, transferred to the Protestant community, and demolished in 1927.

Many of Tenbosch's earliest streets and buildings appeared along the Avenue Louise and in adjacent streets such as the Rue de Florence/Florencestraat, the Rue de Livourne, the Rue du Bailli and the Rue Faider/Faiderstraat. The area initially attracted the affluent bourgeoisie, who built late neoclassical and eclectic town houses with balconies, bay windows and sculpted stone details. Notable Art Nouveau architects such as Victor Horta and Paul Hankar completed major works there, alongside houses by Ernest Blérot, Léon Delune, Armand Van Waesberghe and Albert Roosenboom, and Beaux-Arts residences by Ernest Jaspar, Paul Saintenoy, Alexis and Albert Dumont and Adrien Blomme. The more distant parts of the district, between the Rue de la Pépinière/Boomkwekerijstraat and the Chaussée de Waterloo, were developed around 1900 with more modest but stylistically similar houses.

From the beginning, the neighbourhood also hosted shops and small industries, particularly woodworking, likely due to the proximity of the Sonian Forest, as well as coachbuilding workshops, including the well-known D'Ieteren Group.

== Sights ==
- The Church of the Holy Trinity, a Catholic church designed in neo-Baroque style and built in 1893–1907. It incorporates the Baroque façade of the former Temple of the Augustinians.
- The neighbourhood has many late 19th-century and early 20th-century houses in various styles, such as Art Nouveau, Art Deco, Eclecticism and Modernism, several of which are listed:
  - The eclectic house of the architect Adrien Blomme, located on the Rue Américaine/Amerikaansestraat;
  - The eclectic house and studio of the painter Paul Mathieu, also on the Rue Américaine;
  - The Meunier Museum, in the last house in which Meunier lived and worked, on the Rue de l'Abbaye/Abdijstraat;
  - The Art Nouveau house of the writer and art critic Sander Pierron, designed by Victor Horta, on the Rue de l'Aqueduc/Waterleidingsstraat.
- Tenbosch Park, a noted park in the middle of the district.
- The Armenian genocide memorial, designed by the architect Isabelle Jakhian in 1997, on the Square Henri Michaux/Henri Michauxsquare.
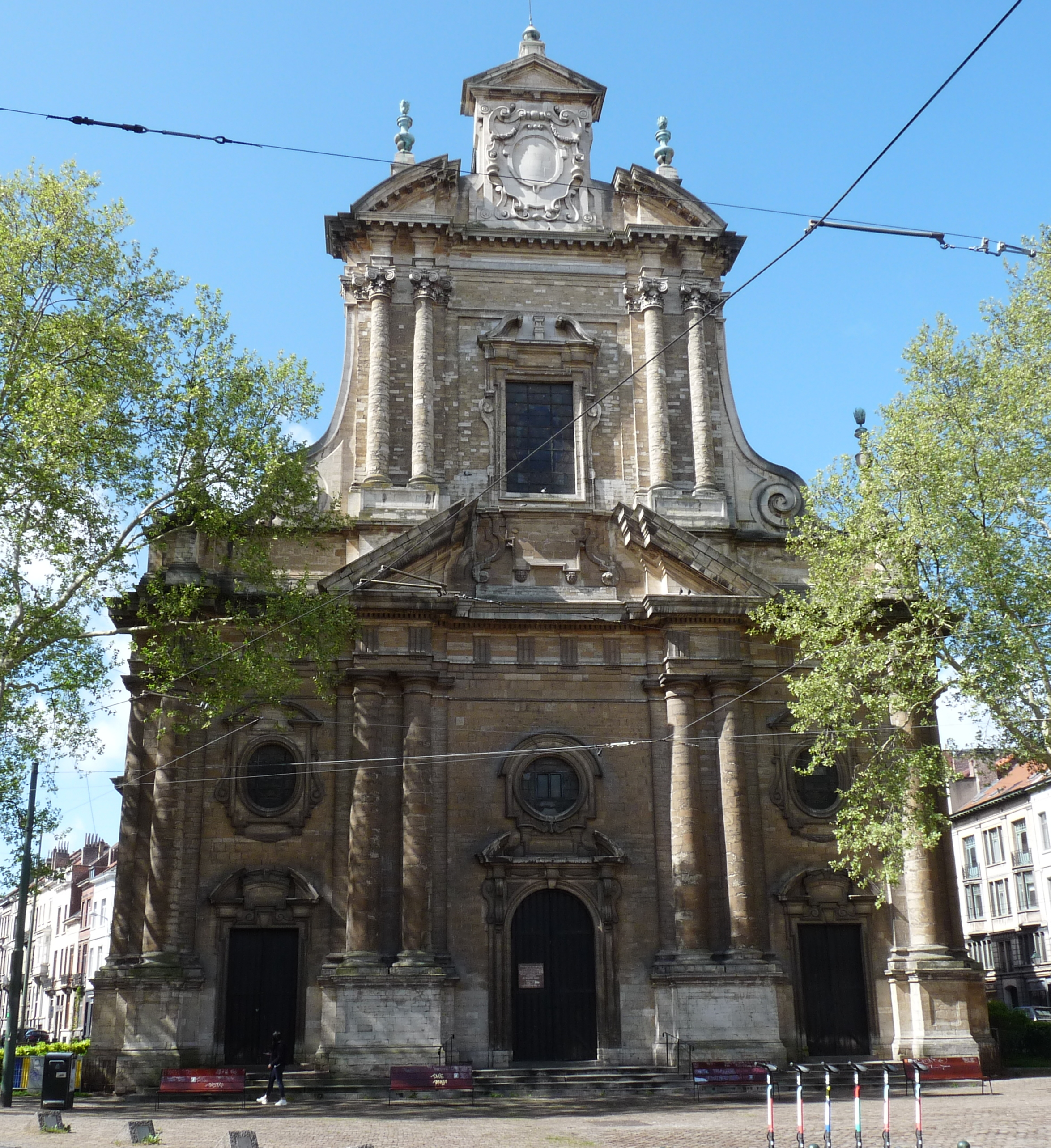
Church of the Holy Trinity

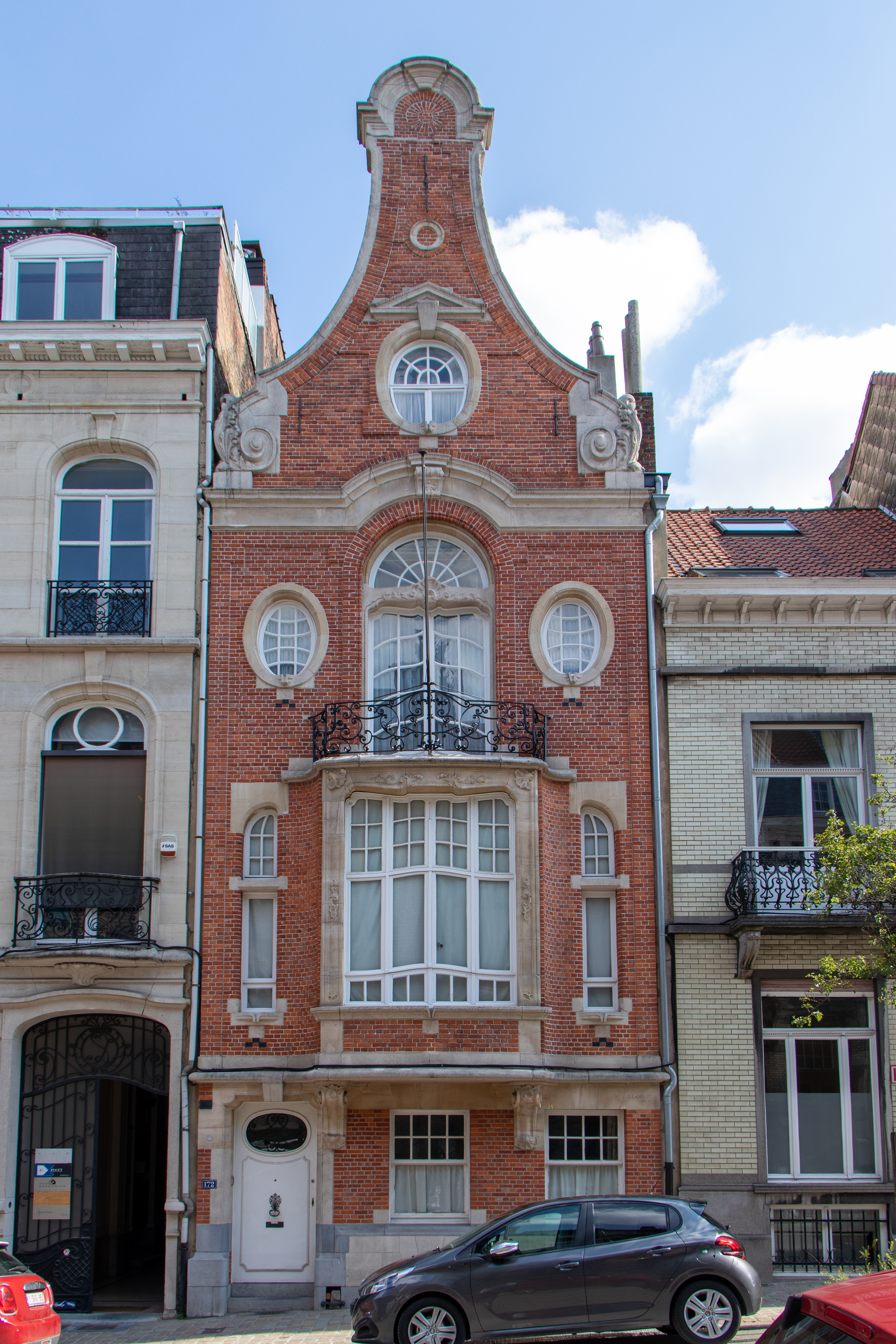
Paul Mathieu House

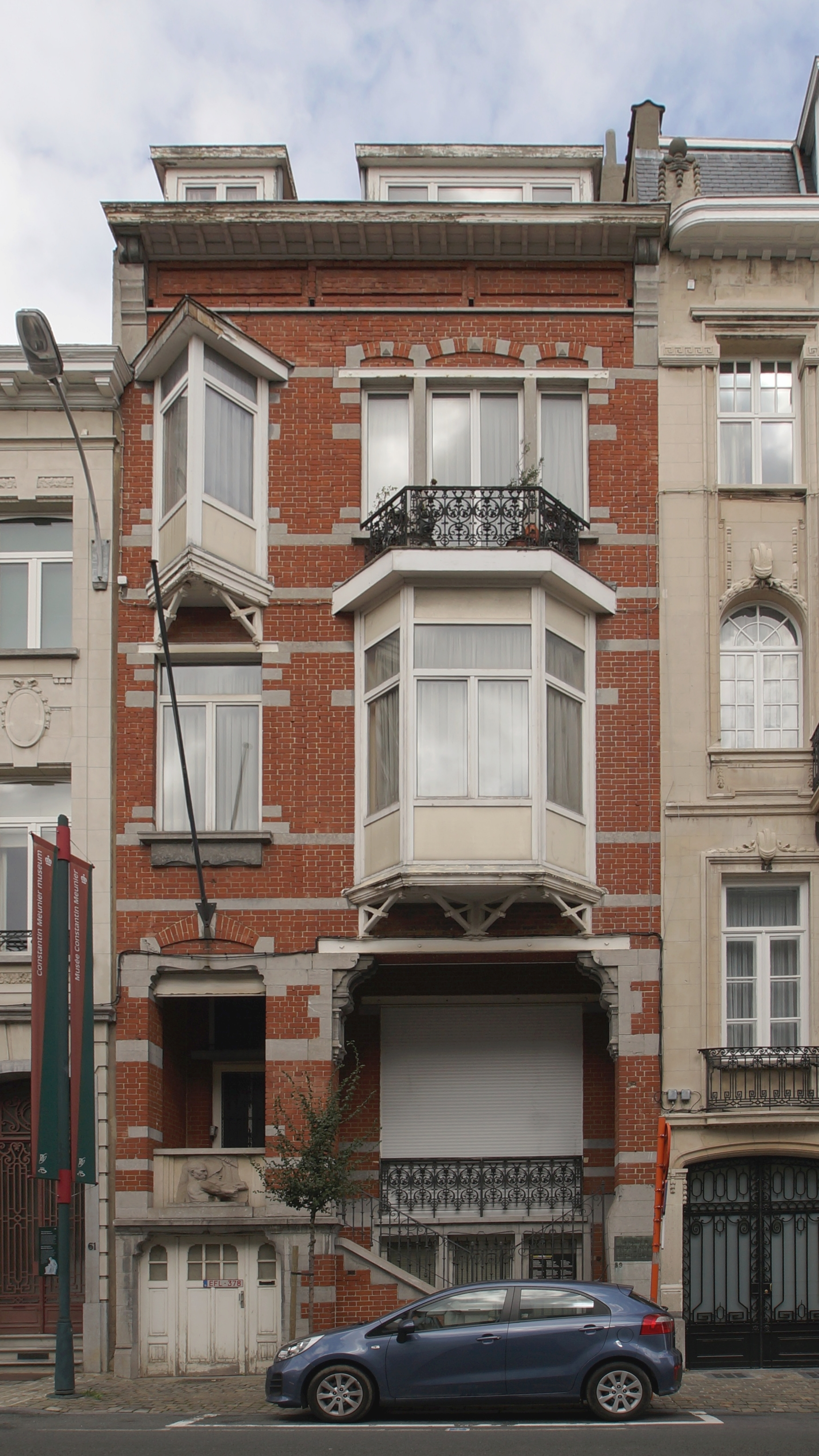
Meunier Museum

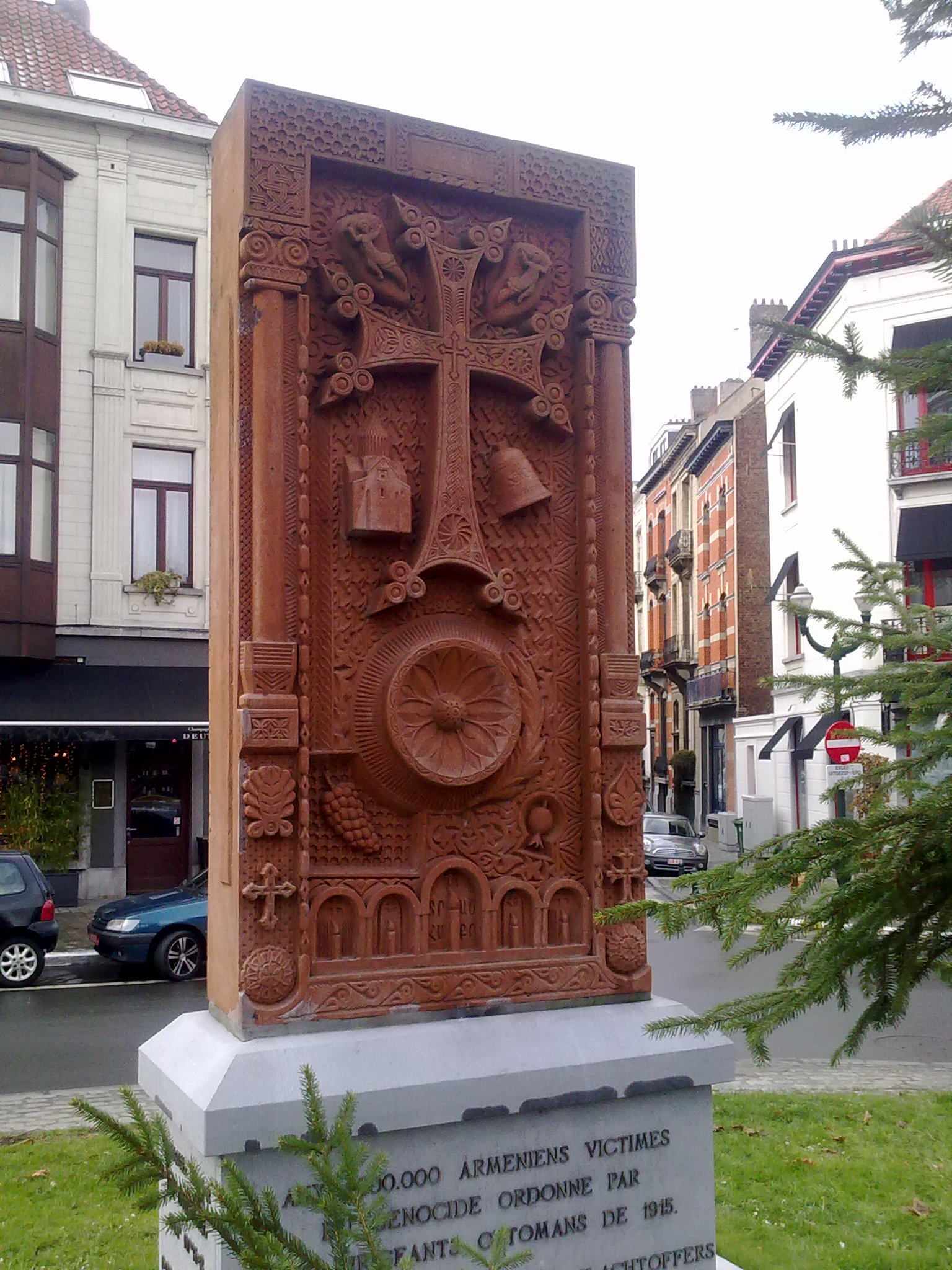
Armenian genocide memorial

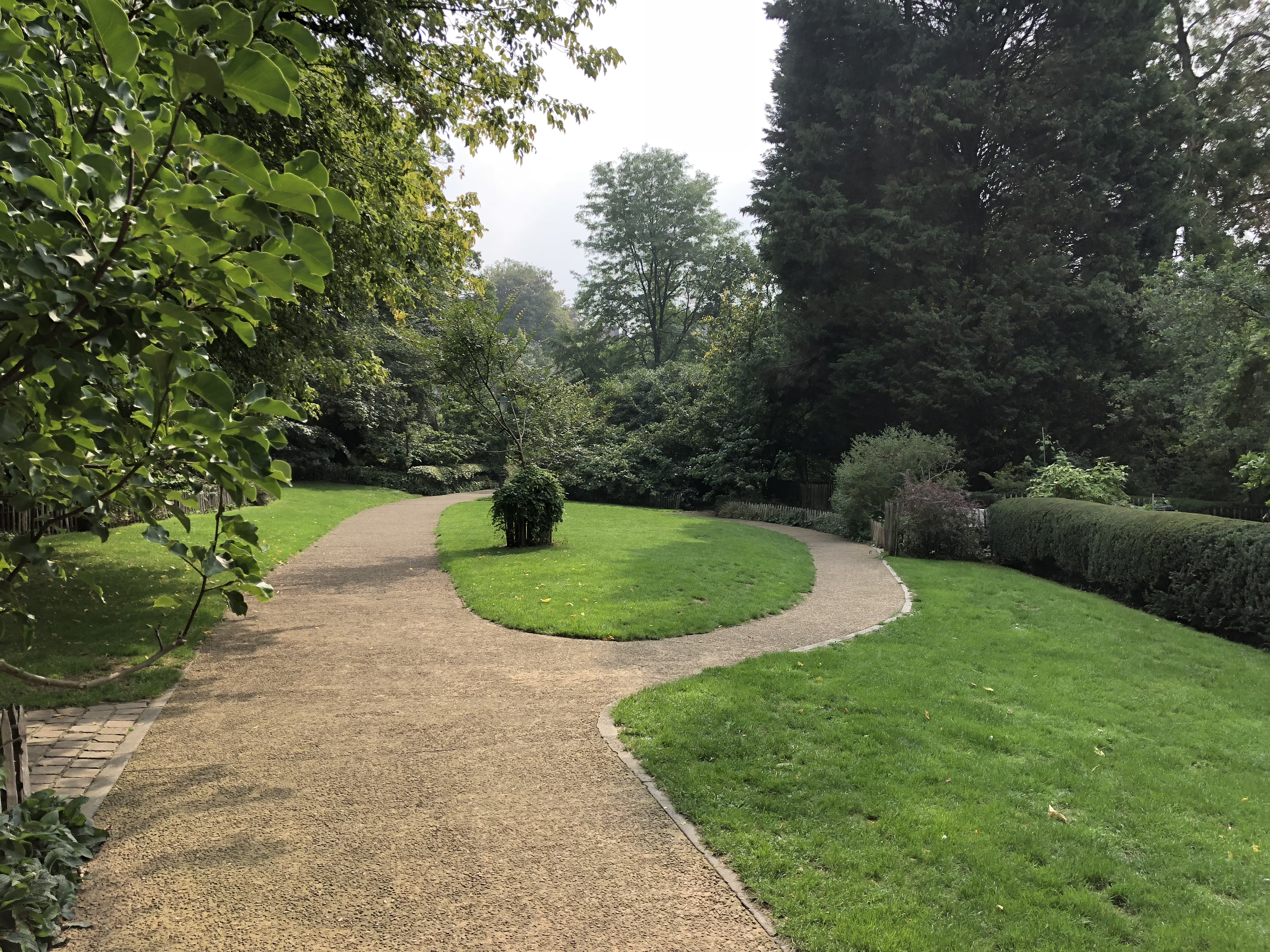
Tenbosch Park

== See also ==
- Neighbourhoods in Brussels
- History of Brussels
- Belgium in the long nineteenth century
