= Chaussée de Waterloo =

Thoroughfare in Brussels, Belgium

Chaussée de Waterloo (French); Waterloosesteenweg (Dutch)
- Waterloose Steenweg (Dutch)
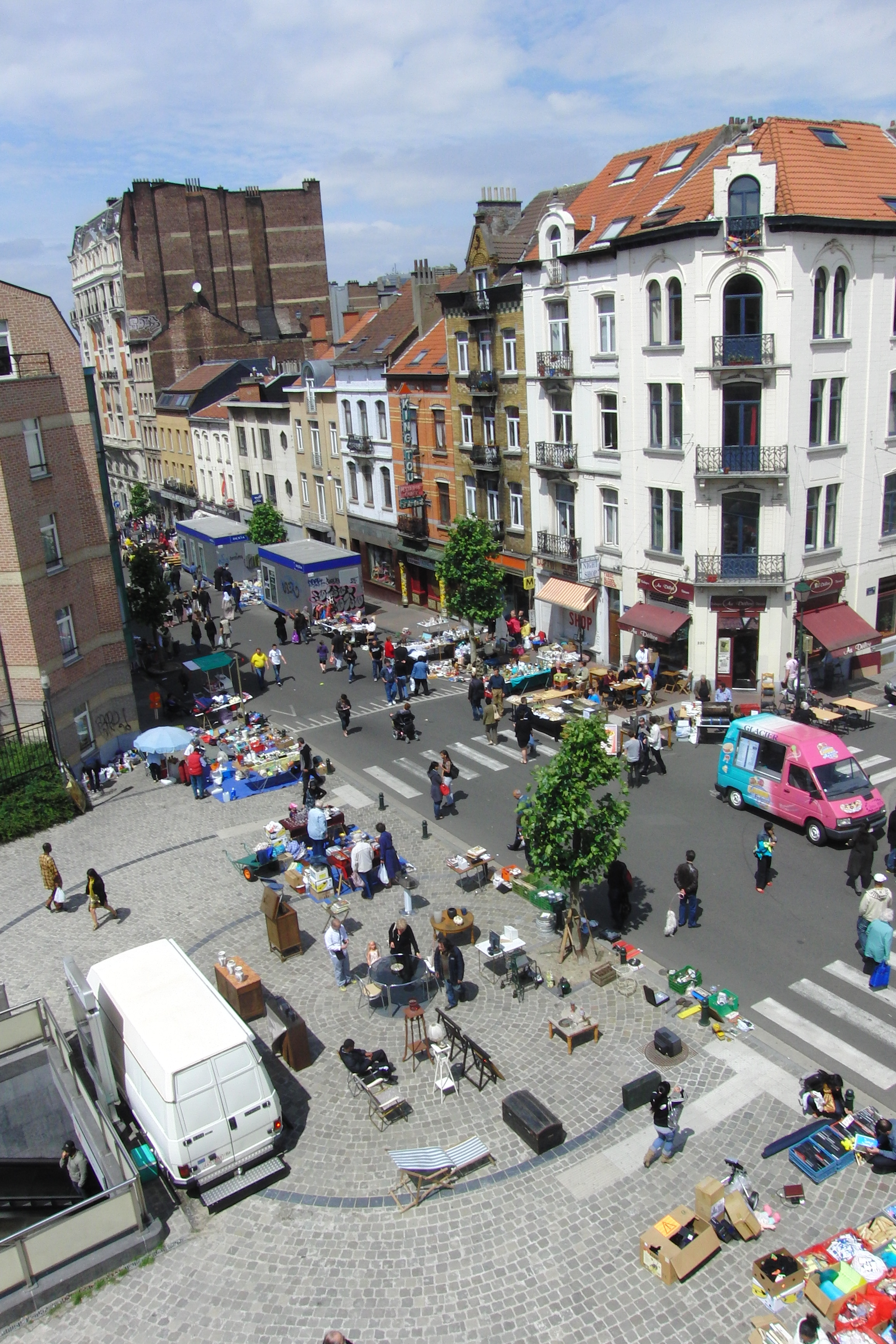
- Flea market at Horta premetro station, Chaussée de Waterloo/Waterloosesteenweg, in Saint-Gilles

- Location within Brussels Location within Belgium
- Namesake: Waterloo
- Type: Chaussee
- Length: 12.4 km (7.7 mi)
- Location: Brussels-Capital Region, Rhode-Saint-Genèse and Waterloo, Belgium
- Coordinates: 50°46′49″N 4°22′54″E

The Chaussée de Waterloo (French, pronounced [ʃo.se d(ə) watɛʁlo]) or Waterloosesteenweg (Dutch, pronounced [ˈʋaː.tər.loː.səˌsteːn.ʋɛx]) is a long north–south arterial road from Brussels to Waterloo, Belgium. It begins at the Halle Gate in the Brussels municipality of Saint-Gilles, continues a course towards the south-east until the Bascule area of Uccle, then turns south in the direction of Waterloo, where it changes its name to become the Chaussée de Bruxelles and continues in the direction of Genappe and Charleroi (Wallonia) until the regional border. Its length is 12.4 kilometres (7.7 mi) and its width between 15 and 18 metres (49 and 59 ft).

Historically, the Chaussée de Waterloo was the main road from Brussels to Charleroi, crossing the Sonian Forest, and it remains one of the region's main arteries. The road crosses several districts, working class at its starting point in Saint-Gilles, but adorned with chic boutiques and restaurants as it progresses towards Waterloo, in particular in the Fort Jaco district in Uccle and in Waterloo itself. It is also home to many neoclassical, Art Nouveau and Art Deco town houses, and other historical buildings. It is served by TEC and De Lijn buses 123, 365a, R36 and W, which have replaced the rural trams, as well as municipal buses 51, 42 and 53 for short segments.

== History ==
The Chaussée de Waterloo appeared in 1662. Originally, it was simply an extension of the old Chaussée de Vleurgat/Vleurgatsesteenweg from the place called La Bascule to Waterloo. The road, which was also called the Chaussée de Wallonie/Waalse Steenweg, was again extended at the end of the 17th century to Charleroi and Namur. In 1711, under the Austrian rule, it was decided to divert the new road at La Bascule and to extend it to the Halle Gate in Saint-Gilles. The construction was carried out between 1725 and 1727. The first section, connecting the Halle Gate to the Barrière de Saint-Gilles/Bareel van Sint-Gillis (lit. 'Barrier of Saint Giles', named after the tollgate that stood there), follows the slight curves of the old Wegh naer Ukkel (Middle Dutch for 'Way towards Uccle'). The second section, for its part, constitutes a new straight artery linking the Barrière to Ixelles.

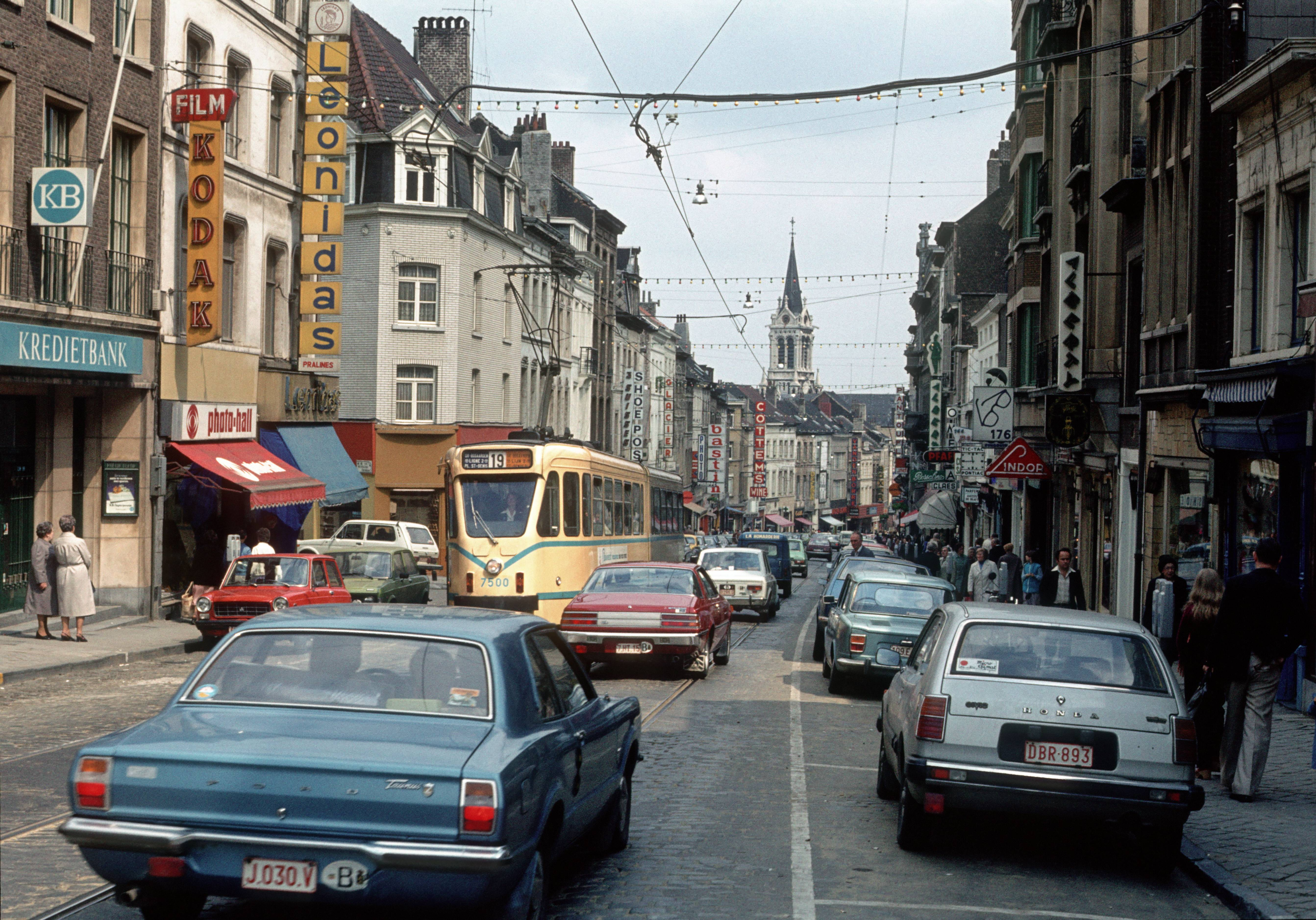
The Chaussée de Waterloo / Waterloosesteenweg in Saint-Gilles in the 1980s

Since the end of the 19th century, the Chaussée de Waterloo has been one of the main commercial arteries to and from Brussels and has therefore played a crucial role in the development of the districts it crosses. The straight part of the street was developed from the mid-1870s. From 1890, the constructions rose at an increasingly rapid rate, so by the 1910s, the road was almost entirely built.

Until the beginning of the 20th century, the Chaussée de Waterloo included a bridge (Hoge Brugge), at the level of Ma Campagne in Saint-Gilles, which spanned a sunken road leading to Saint-Job/Sint-Job (today's Avenue Brugmann/Brugmannlaan). During the construction of the Berkendael/Berkendaal district, which began around 1875, the irregular relief of the land was levelled, making the bridge superfluous. Consequently, the old Hoge Brugge way also disappeared, although its name persists in the present Avenue du Haut-Pont/Hoge-Bruggelaan.

From the beginning of the 20th century, the road was a prosperous place of commerce. The creation of the link between Brussels-South railway station and Uccle, first by horse-drawn tramway (1871–1879) then, from 1896, by an electric tram line, undoubtedly contributed to this development. The last major building campaigns took place during the 1930s. In the evening of 3 September 1944, tanks of the British Guards Armoured Division appeared after a forced advance on the Chaussée de Waterloo. They met hardly any resistance and liberated Brussels that same day.

Nowadays, the Chaussée de Waterloo is used daily by many commuters living outside Brussels who come to work in the Belgian capital. It is thus one of the region's main arteries, and helps to smooth traffic at its southern end. Houses intended solely for residential use are rare; most of them also fulfil a commercial function. In order to adapt to fashions, store fronts have undergone many transformations. Apart from commercial activities, the street is also lined with of a few industries, as well as offices.

== Description ==
In the territory of Ixelles (from no. 363 to no. 685 and from no. 410 to no. 732), the Chaussée de Waterloo is straight between the crossroads it forms with the Chaussée de Charleroi/Charleroisesteenweg, at Ma Campagne (Saint-Gilles), and those formed by the Chaussée de Vleurgat, the Avenue Molière/Molièrelaan and the Rue Général Patton/Generaal Pattonstraat (near Uccle). It divides the Ixelles enclave into two distinct parts. On the one hand, to the north-east, the Tenbosch/Tenbos district (1864) that the Chaussée de Charleroi and the Avenue Louise/Louizalaan delimit. On the other, to the south-west, the Berkendael district (1902), a triangular territory delimited by the Avenue Brugmann and the Avenue Molière. The mixed nature that characterises the entire roadway is no exception there.

On the Brussels section, there are many historical terraced houses, and old country houses, such as no. 928, in Art Deco style, by the architect Édouard Antoine, and no. 916, sharply set back from the alignment. Several houses belong to neoclassicism: no. 920 (1893), modified in 1911–12, and no. 922, under a hipped roof and retaining an old door with an open transom lined with glazing bars, dating from the third quarter of the 19th century. Regarding shops and restaurants, at no. 964, straddling Brussels and Uccle and at the current location of the service station, there was, at the beginning of the 20th century, the café-restaurant-boarding house Le Vert Chasseur, to be related to the development of the Bois de la Cambre/Ter Kamerenbos. No. 892–915, currently a motorcycle shop, was originally a boat showroom. These two hangars were built in 1961 and 1970 and equipped with a basin to present the models.

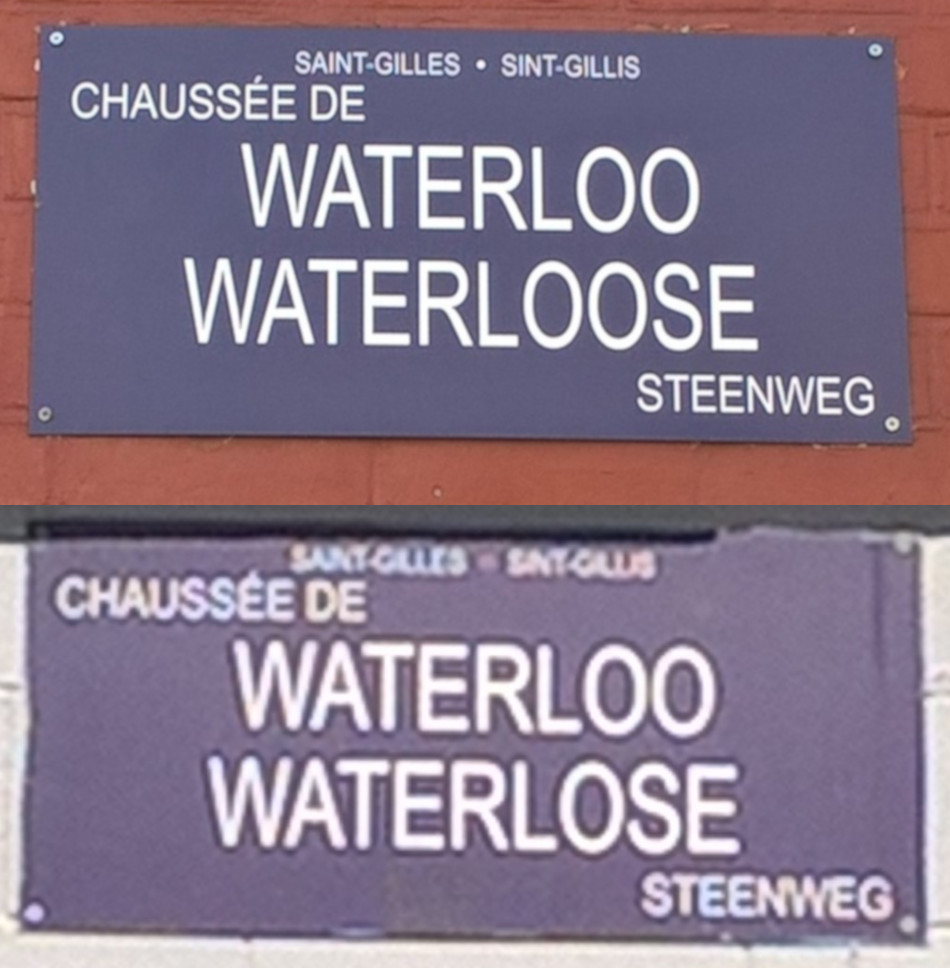
Official names of the Chaussée de Waterloo in French and Dutch

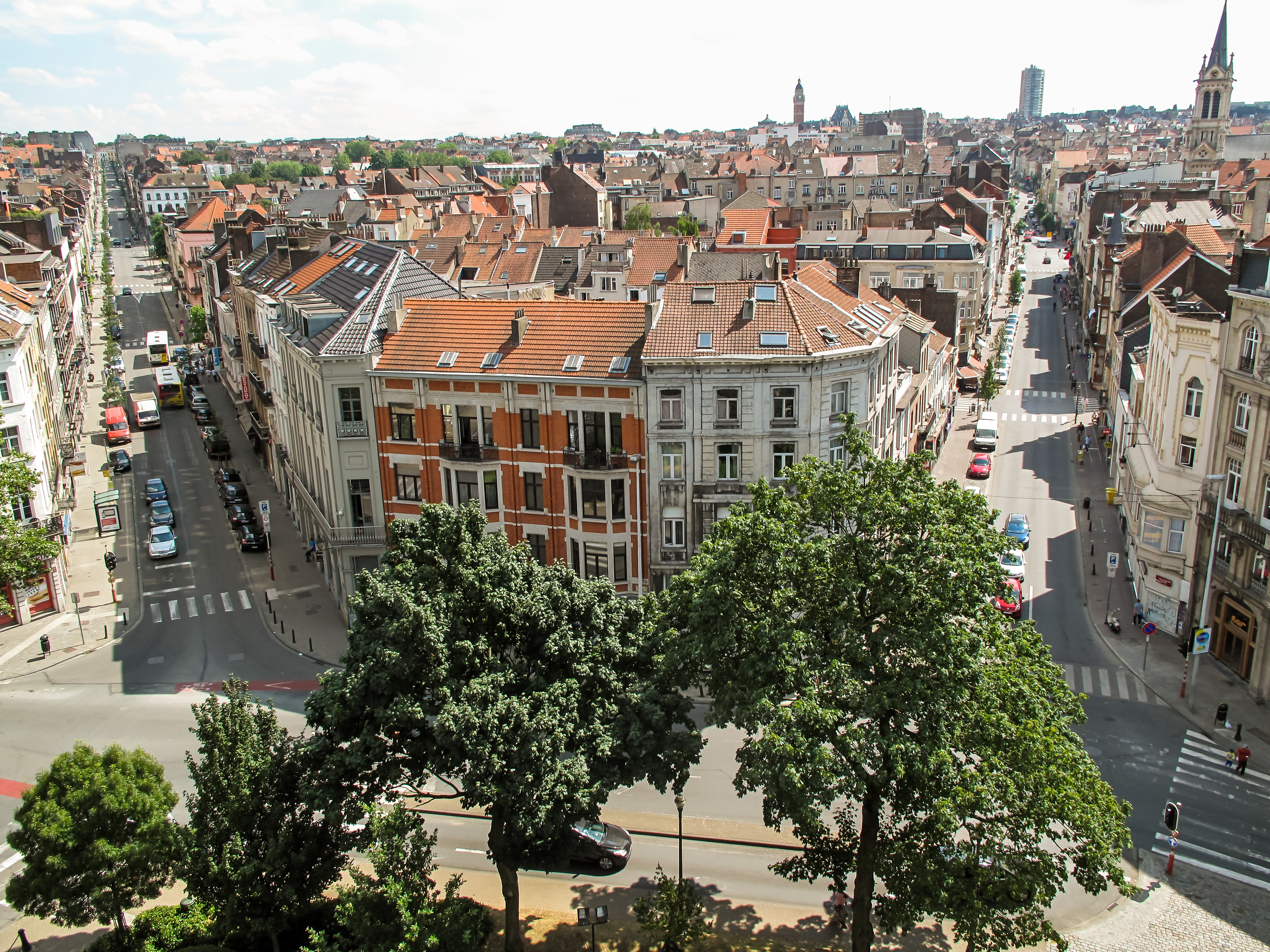
Start of the Chaussée de Waterloo (on the right) from the Halle Gate

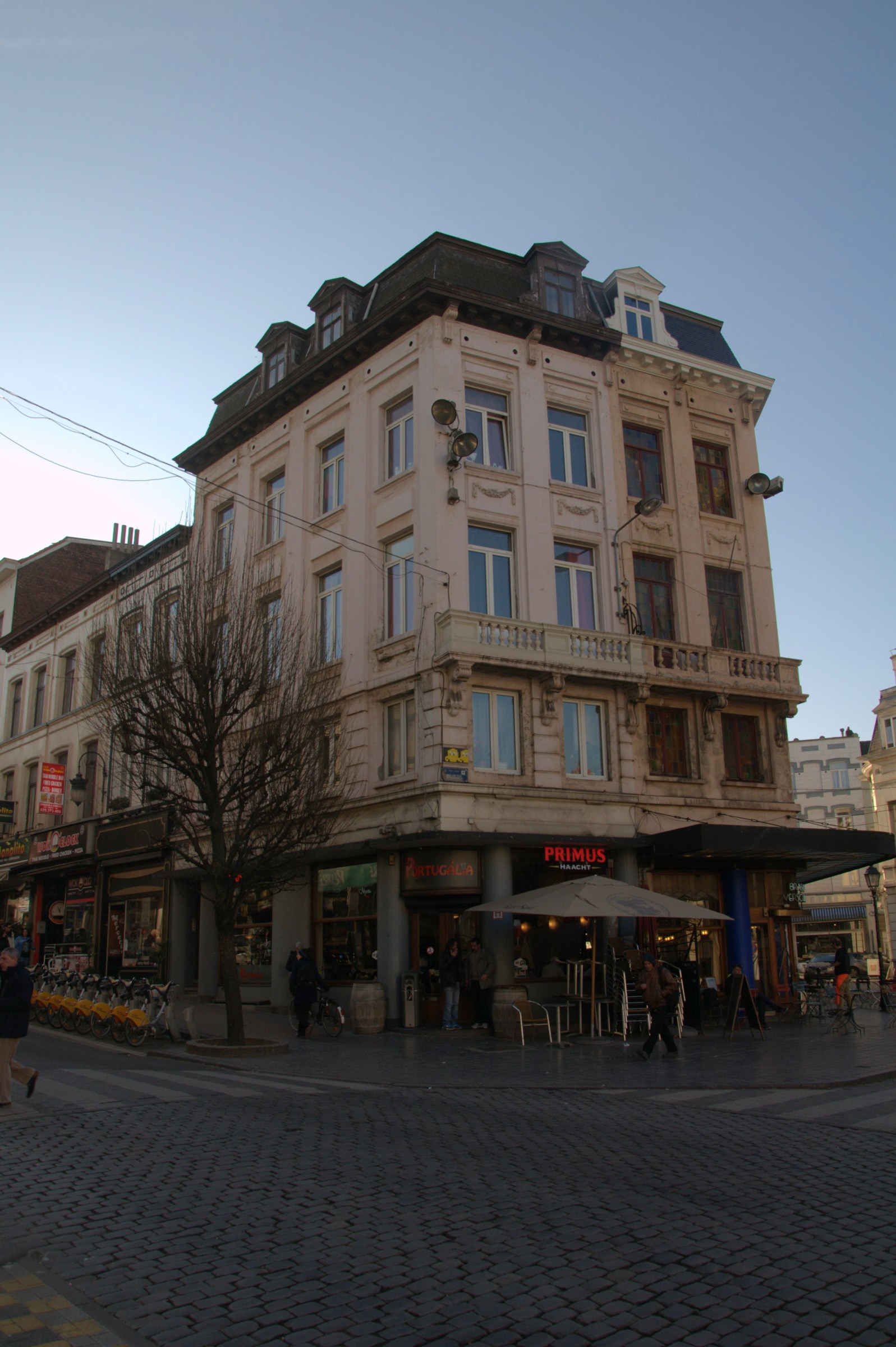
Brasserie Verschueren, Chaussée de Waterloo 59, Parvis de Saint-Gilles 11

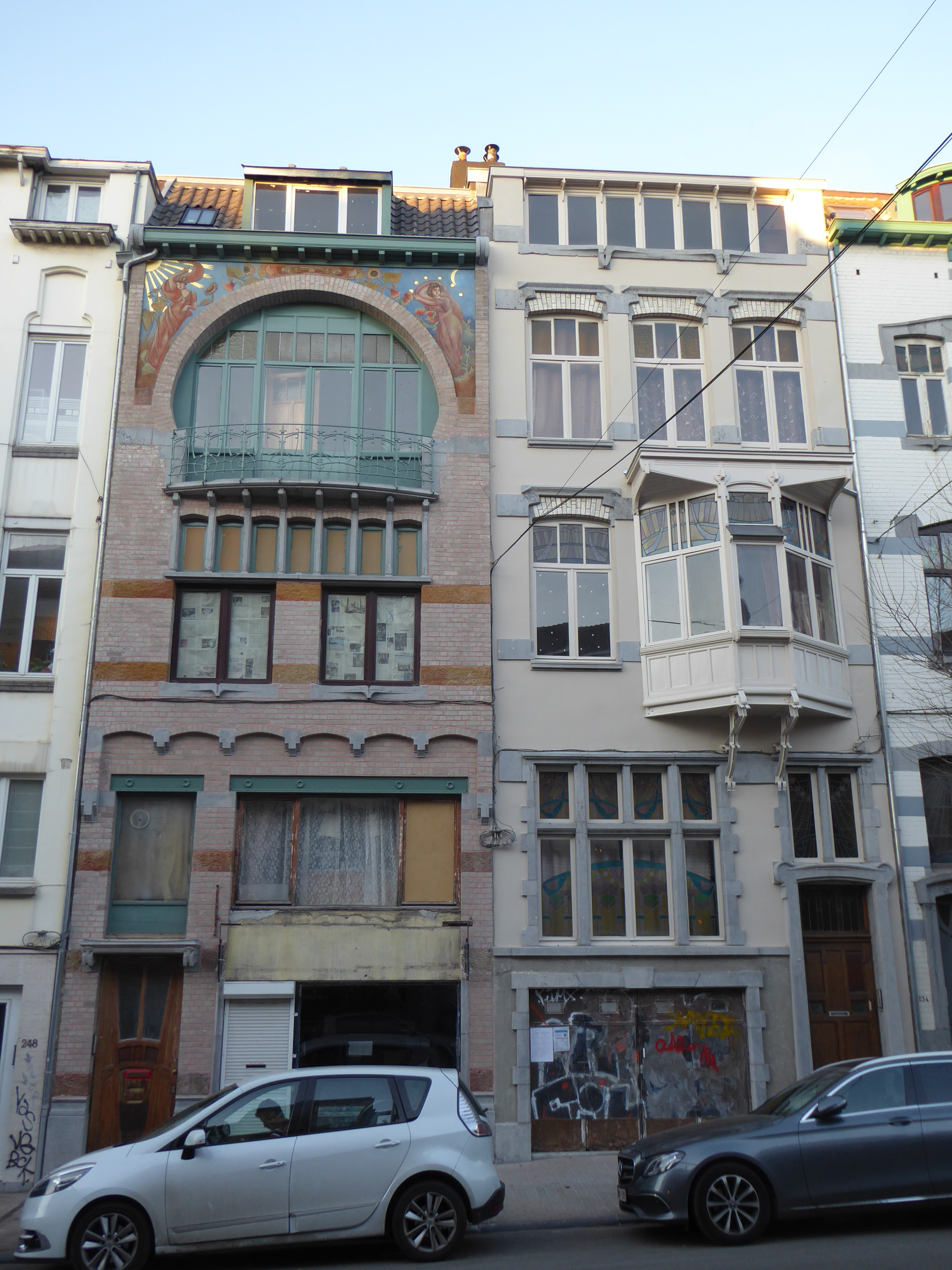
Art Nouveau town houses (Van Oostveen, 1901), Chaussée de Waterloo 250–252

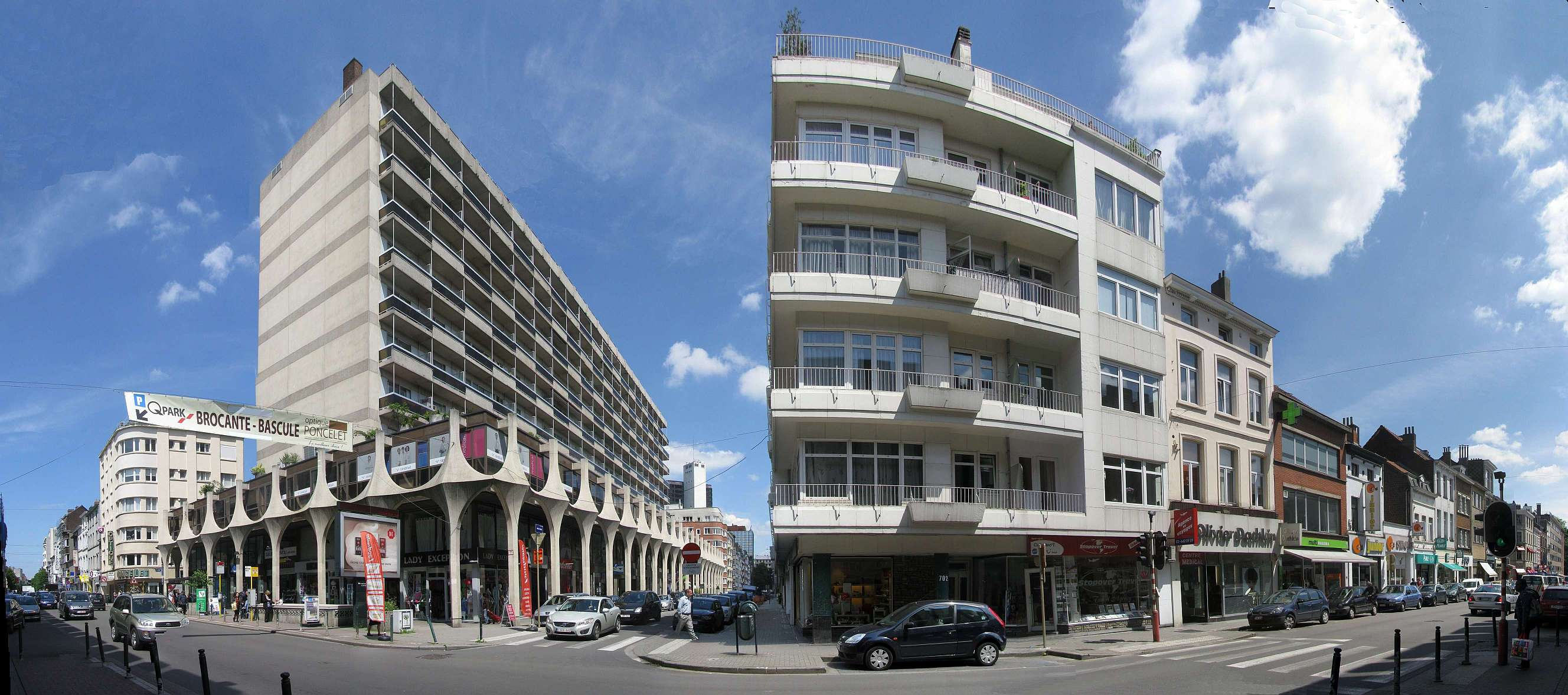
Bascule district and Rivoli residence, Chaussée de Waterloo 690, corner of the Rue Emile Claus/Emile Clausstraat

== See also ==
- List of streets in Brussels
- Neoclassical architecture in Belgium
- Art Nouveau in Brussels
- Art Deco in Brussels
- History of Brussels
- Belgium in the long nineteenth century
