= List of parks and gardens in Brussels =

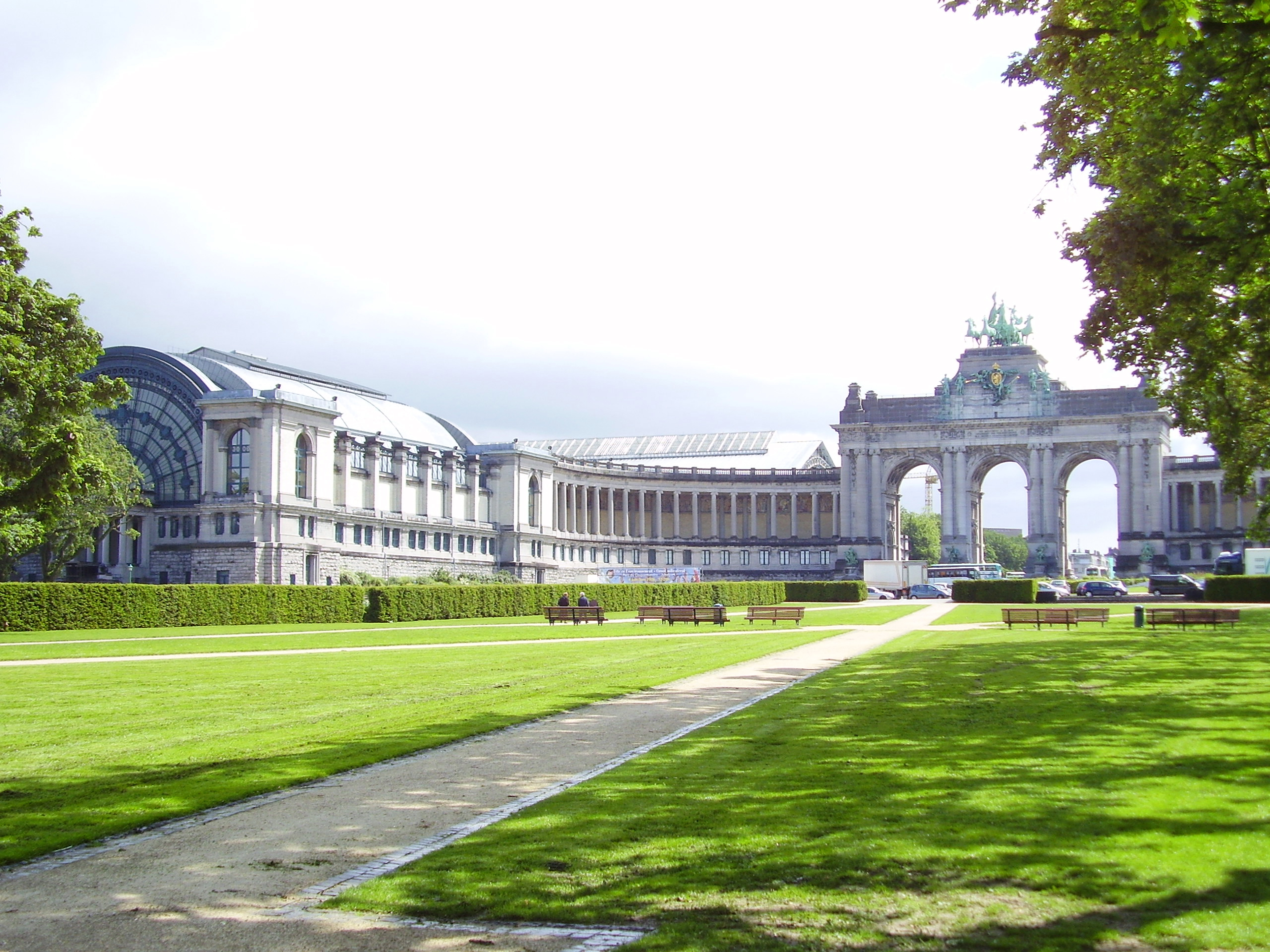
Parc du Cinquantenaire/Jubelpark

Brussels is one of the greenest capitals in Europe, with over 8,000 hectares of green spaces. Vegetation cover and natural areas are higher in the outskirts, where they have limited the peri-urbanisation of the capital, but they decrease sharply towards the centre of Brussels; 10% in the central Pentagon, 30% of the municipalities in the first ring, and 71% of the municipalities in the second ring are occupied by green spaces.

Many parks and gardens, both public and privately owned, are scattered throughout the city. In addition to this, the Sonian Forest is located in its southern part and stretches out over the three Belgian regions. As of 2017, it has been inscribed as a UNESCO World Heritage Site, the only Belgian component to the multinational inscription 'Primeval Beech Forests of the Carpathians and Other Regions of Europe'.

A park or garden located on the territory of several municipalities is listed for each municipality.

== Anderlecht ==
Name	District	Coordinates	Area	Image
Astrid Park	Meir	50°49′59″N 4°17′53″E		
Busselenberg Park	Veeweyde/Veeweide	50°49′49″N 4°18′16″E		
Parc des Étangs/Vijverspark	Ponds Quarter	50°49′28″N 4°17′4″E		
Parc Forestier/Bospark	Scheut	50°50′29″N 4°18′40″E		
Jean Vives Park	Ponds Quarter	50°49′34″N 4°16′56″E		
Pede Park	Neerpede	50°49′32″N 4°16′19″E		
Scherdemael Park	Scherdemael/Scherdemaal	50°49′54″N 4°17′15″E		
Scheutveld Park	Scheutveld	50°50′37″N 4°17′50″E		

== Auderghem/Oudergem ==
Name	District	Coordinates	Area	Image
Jean Massart Botanical Garden		50°48′50″N 4°26′17″E		
Rouge Cloître/Roodklooster		50°48′28″N 4°26′38″E	13.61 ha (33.6 acres)	
Seny Park	Transvaal	50°48′34″N 4°25′43″E		
Val Duchesse/Hertoginnedal	Val Duchesse/Hertoginnedal	50°49′13″N 4°26′01″E		
Woluwe Park	Chant d'Oiseau/Vogelzang	50.829°N 4.427°E	69.28 ha (171.2 acres)	

== Berchem-Sainte-Agathe/Sint-Agatha-Berchem ==
Name	District	Coordinates	Area	Image
Wilder Wood	Potaarde	50°51′31″N 4°17′26″E		

== City of Brussels ==
=== Pentagon ===
Name	District	Coordinates	Area	Image
Brussels Park	Royal Quarter	50.8446°N 4.3637°E	13.1 ha (32 acres)	
Egmont Park	Sablon/Zavel	50°50′19″N 4°21′26″E	1.42 ha (3.5 acres)	
Halle Gate Park	Marolles/Marollen	50°49′59″N 4°20′41″E	3.2 ha (7.9 acres)	
Mont des Arts/Kunstberg	Royal Quarter	50°50′38″N 04°21′24″E	1.4 ha (3.5 acres)	
Square of the Small Sablon	Sablon/Zavel	50°50′24″N 04°21′22″E	0.29 ha (0.72 acres)	

=== Eastern districts ===
Name	District	Coordinates	Area	Image
Parc du Cinquantenaire/Jubelpark	European Quarter	50°50′26″N 4°23′34″E	34.22 ha (84.6 acres)	
Leopold Park	Leopold Quarter	50°50′18″N 4°22′48″E	6.43 ha (15.9 acres)	
Maelbeek Valley Garden	Leopold Quarter	50°50′38″N 4°22′43″E		

=== Northern districts ===
Name	District	Coordinates	Area	Image
Beco Park	Tour & Taxis	50°51′46″N 4°20′58″E		
Colonial Garden	Laeken/Laken	50°53′18″N 4°20′43″E		
Florist's Gardens	Laeken/Laken	50°53′07″N 4°20′55″E		
Laeken Park	Laeken/Laken	50°53′33″N 04°20′55″E	28.79 ha (71.1 acres)	
Maximilian Park	Northern Quarter	50°51′44″N 4°21′12″E		
Osseghem Park	Heysel/Heizel	50°53′44″N 4°20′47″E	15.9 ha (39 acres)	
Sobieski Park	Laeken/Laken	50°53′08″N 4°20′43″E		
Tour & Taxis Park	Tour & Taxis	50°52′13″N 4°20′31″E		

=== Southern districts ===
Name	District	Coordinates	Area	Image
Bois de la Cambre/Ter Kamerenbos	Louise/Louiza	50°48′11″N 4°22′52″E	122.34 ha (302.3 acres)	
King's Garden	Louise/Louiza	50°49′18″N 4°22′17″E		
La Cambre Abbey	Louise/Louiza	50°49′08″N 4°22′27″E		

== Etterbeek ==
Name	District	Coordinates	Area	Image
Jean-Félix Hap Garden	Jourdan	50°50′04″N 4°23′09″E		

== Forest/Vorst ==
Name	District	Coordinates	Area	Image
Duden Park	Altitude Cent/Hoogte Honderd	50°49′01″N 4°19′52″E	22.76 ha (56.2 acres)	
Forest Park	Altitude Cent/Hoogte Honderd	50°49′21″N 4°20′13″E	13 ha (32 acres)	

== Ganshoren ==
Name	District	Coordinates	Area	Image
King Baudouin Park		50°52′53″N 4°19′09″E		

== Ixelles/Elsene ==
Name	District	Coordinates	Area	Image
La Cambre Abbey	Louise/Louiza	50°49′08″N 4°22′27″E		
Ixelles Ponds	Flagey	50°49′25″N 4°22′24″E	5.5 ha (14 acres)	
Tenbosch Park	Tenbosch/Tenbos	50°49′12″N 4°21′53″E	1.8 ha (4.4 acres)	

== Jette ==
Name	District	Coordinates	Area	Image
Dieleghem Wood	Dieleghem/Dielegem	50°53′14″N 4°19′26″E		
King Baudouin Park		50°52′53″N 4°19′09″E		
Laerbeek Wood	Laerbeek/Laarbeek	50°53′16″N 4°17′56″E		

== Koekelberg ==
Name	District	Coordinates	Area	Image
Elisabeth Park	Basilica Quarter	50°51′54″N 4°19′28″E	21 ha (52 acres)	

== Molenbeek-Saint-Jean/Sint-Jans-Molenbeek ==
Name	District	Coordinates	Area	Image
Albert Park	Machtens	50°51′05″N 4°18′55″E		
Karreveld Park	Karreveld	50°51′37″N 4°18′55″E		
Marie-José Park	Machtens	50°51′5″N 4°19′8″E		
Scheutbos Park	Mettewie	50°51′00″N 4°17′30″E		

== Saint-Gilles/Sint-Gillis ==
Name	District	Coordinates	Area	Image
Pierre Paulus Park		50°49′44″N 4°20′57″E		
Forest Park	Altitude Cent/Hoogte Honderd	50°49′21″N 4°20′13″E		
Hélène De Rudder Garden		50.82935°N 4.34533°E		
Joséphine-Hortense Mairesse Park		50.82843°N 4.34516°E		

== Saint-Josse-ten-Noode/Sint-Joost-ten-Node ==
Name	District	Coordinates	Area	Image
Botanical Garden of Brussels	Northern Quarter	50.85488°N 4.365192°E	5.15 ha (12.7 acres)	

== Schaerbeek/Schaarbeek ==
Name	District	Coordinates	Area	Image
Josaphat Park	Josaphat	50°51′44″N 4°23′06″E	30 ha (74 acres)	

== Uccle/Ukkel ==
Name	District	Coordinates	Area	Image
Brugmann Park		50°48′35″N 4°21′07″E		
Montjoie Park	Churchill	50°48′35″N 4°21′27″E		
Wolvendael Park		50°48′00″N 4°20′38″E		

== Watermael-Boitsfort/Watermaal-Bosvoorde ==
Name	District	Coordinates	Area	Image
Seny Park	Transvaal	50°48′34″N 4°25′43″E		
Tournay-Solvay Park		50°47′36″N 4°24′40″E		

== Woluwe-Saint-Lambert/Sint-Lambrechts-Woluwe ==
Name	District	Coordinates	Area	Image
Malou Park		50.842°N 4.439°E		

== Woluwe-Saint-Pierre/Sint-Pieters-Woluwe ==
Name	District	Coordinates	Area	Image
Mellaerts Ponds		50°49′39″N 4°26′02″E		
Parmentier Park		50°49′47″N 4°26′18″E		
Woluwe Park	Chant d'Oiseau/Vogelzang	50.829°N 4.427°E	69.28 ha (171.2 acres)	
