= Tenbosch Park =

Park in Ixelles, Belgium

- Parc Tenbosch (French); Tenboschpark (Dutch)
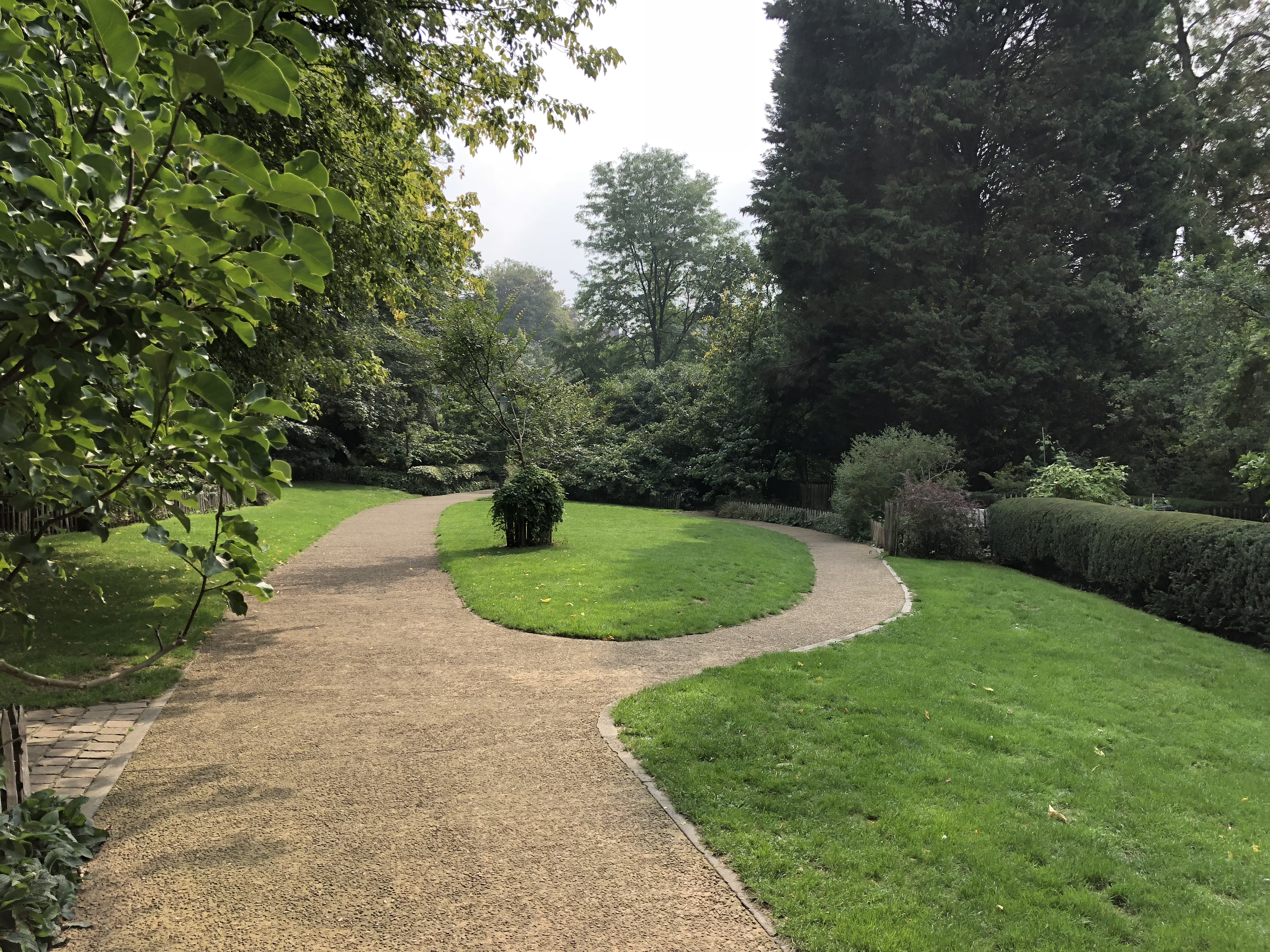
- A view of Tenbosch Park
- Interactive map of Tenbosch Park
- Type: Public park
- Location: Tenbosch/Tenbos, Ixelles, Brussels-Capital Region, Belgium
- Coordinates: 50°49′12″N 4°21′53″E
- Area: 2 ha (4.9 acres)
- Created: June 1985; 41 years ago
- Designer: René Pechère
- Operator: Brussels Environment
- Status: Open year-round

Tenbosch Park (French: Parc Tenbosch [paʁk tɛnbɔʃ]; Dutch: Tenboschpark [ˈtɛmbɔsˌpɑr(ə)k], meaning "in the bush"), is an urban public park in the municipality of Ixelles in Brussels, Belgium. Although relatively small, with an area of 2 ha (4.9 acres), it is notable for its exceptional botanical diversity, including many rare tree species seldom found in Belgium. Surrounded by a wall, it offers a landscaped oasis of calm in a dense urban district.

Tenbosch Park is within a short walking distance of the Avenue Louise/Louizalaan, the Ixelles Ponds, La Cambre Abbey, and the Bois de la Cambre/Ter Kamerenbos.

== History ==
The site originated as a private arboretum developed between 1953 and 1980 by Jean-Louis Semet, a dendrologist and collector of remarkable, particularly exotic, plants. His grandparents (the Semet-Solvay family) had purchased the estate in 1885 to build a château, with surrounding orchards and vegetable gardens. In the early 1950s, Semet expanded the property by acquiring neighbouring plots, demolished the château, and replaced it with a villa at 217, chaussée de Vleurgat/Vleurgatse Steenweg. The gardens were designed in collaboration with Hector Noyer, a horticulturist trained at the Mariemont horticultural school.

In 1982, the Brussels-Capital Region purchased the property and commissioned the landscape architect René Pechère's office to adapt the private garden into a public park. The redesign aimed to preserve the horticultural collections of the Semet-Solvay garden while integrating recreational facilities such as a playground, pétanque court, sports ground, and winding walking paths into the sloped terrain. The process was informed by a participatory design initiative led by the local residents' committee. This was synthesised in plans and a scale model by the architect and painter Konstantin Stefanovitch, who approached the layout as one would a painting, blending requested functions with the existing landscape. The park was officially inaugurated in June 1985, and was opened to the public in 1986.

== Features ==
The park contains a broad collection of trees and shrubs of scientific value, many representative of the Anglo-Saxon nursery trade between the 1950s and 1980s. Seasonal changes bring varied colour and texture, and the park includes two small ponds as well as sculptures, notably Femme debout (1985) by Hélène Delvaux and a stone water basin likely dating from its private ownership period.

The park is maintained by Brussels Environment. Gardeners and landscape architects, including Wolfgang Vahsen, have enriched the botanical collection through research, plant prospecting, and experimentation while upholding the original design principles and dynamic character of the site.

== Gallery ==
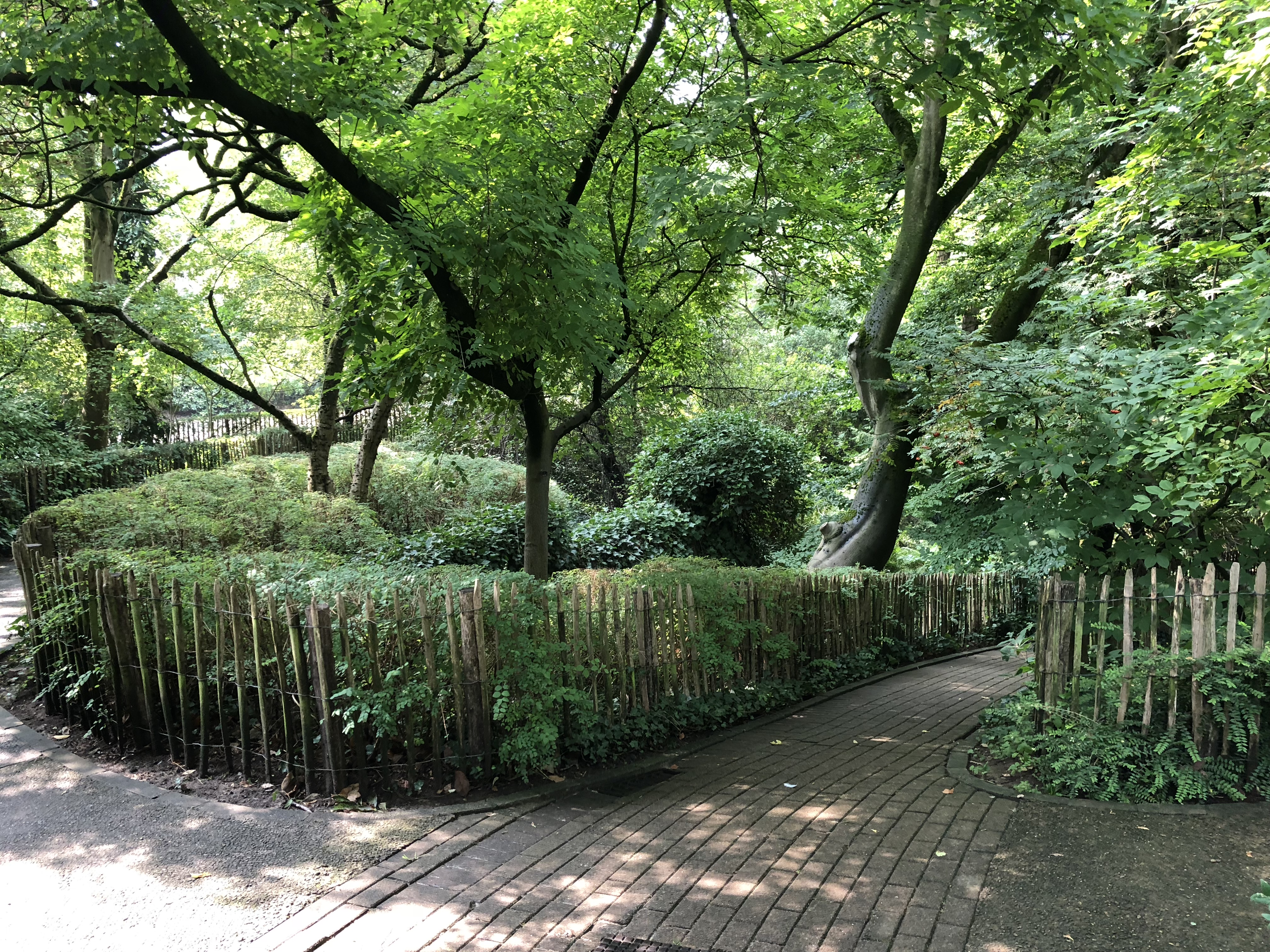
Tenbosch Park

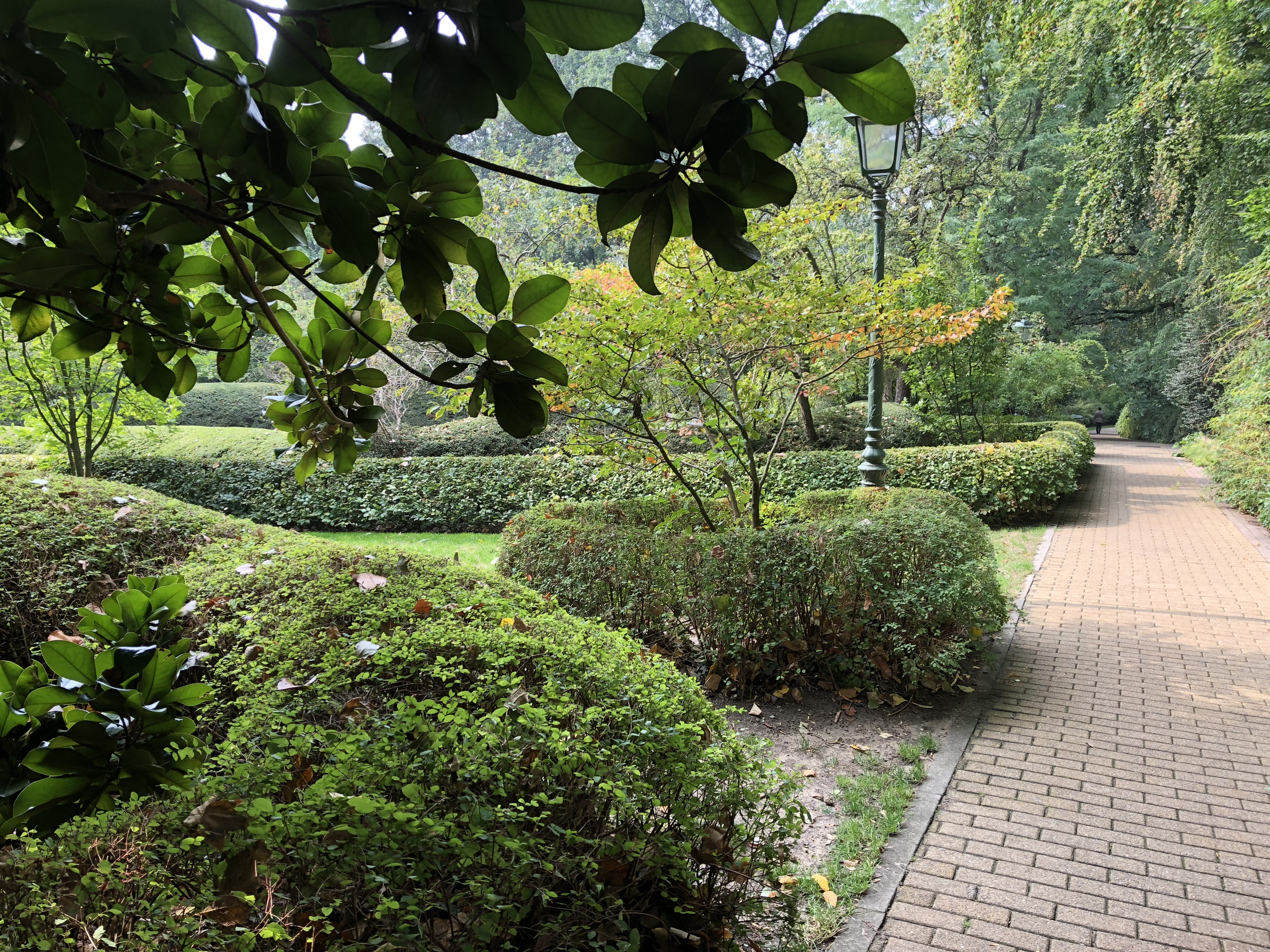
Park alley

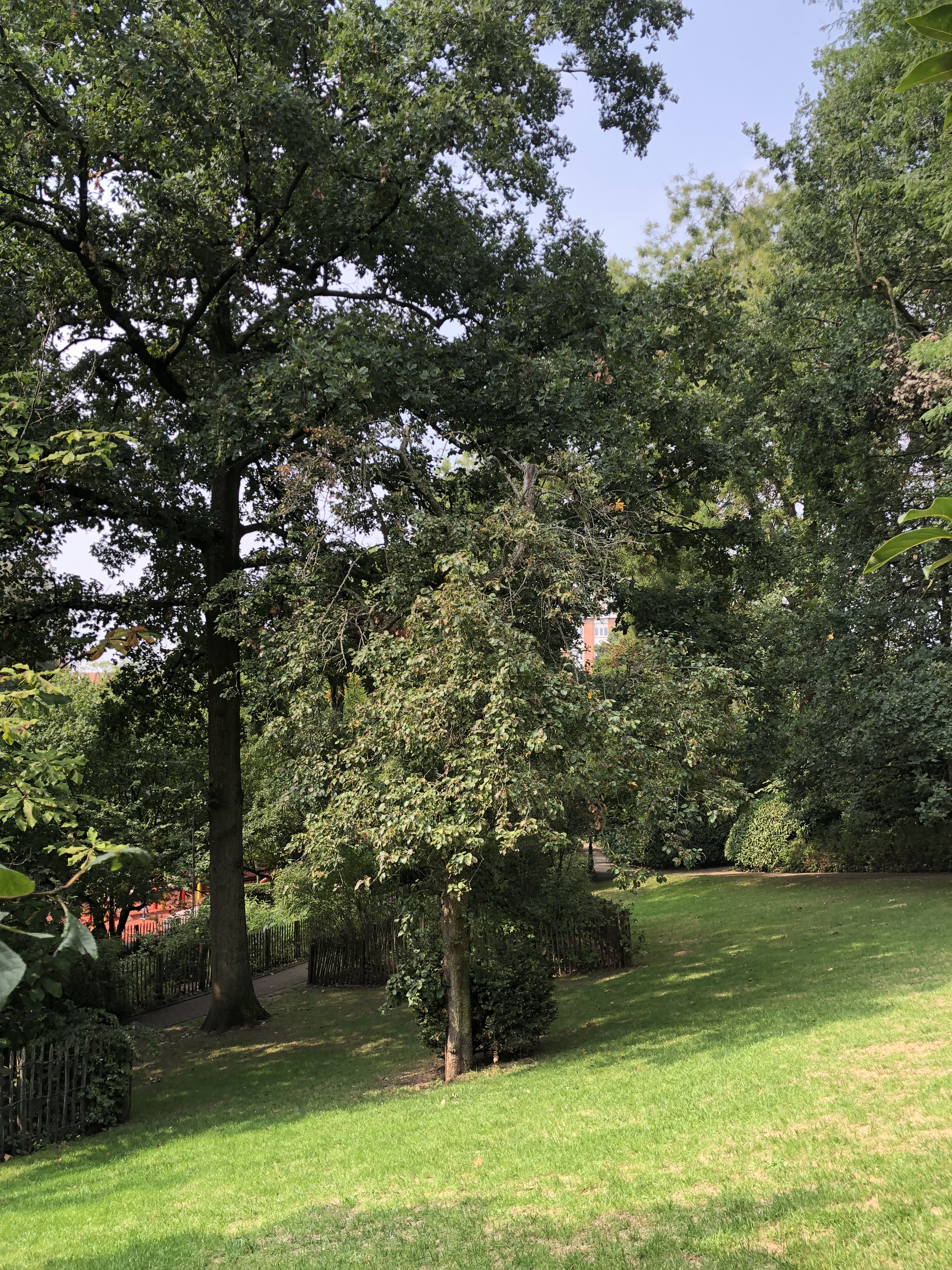
View of the park with the children's playground in the background

== See also ==
- List of parks and gardens in Brussels
- History of Brussels
