= Wolvendael Park =

Park in Uccle, Belgium

- Parc de Wolvendael (French); Wolvendaelpark (Dutch)
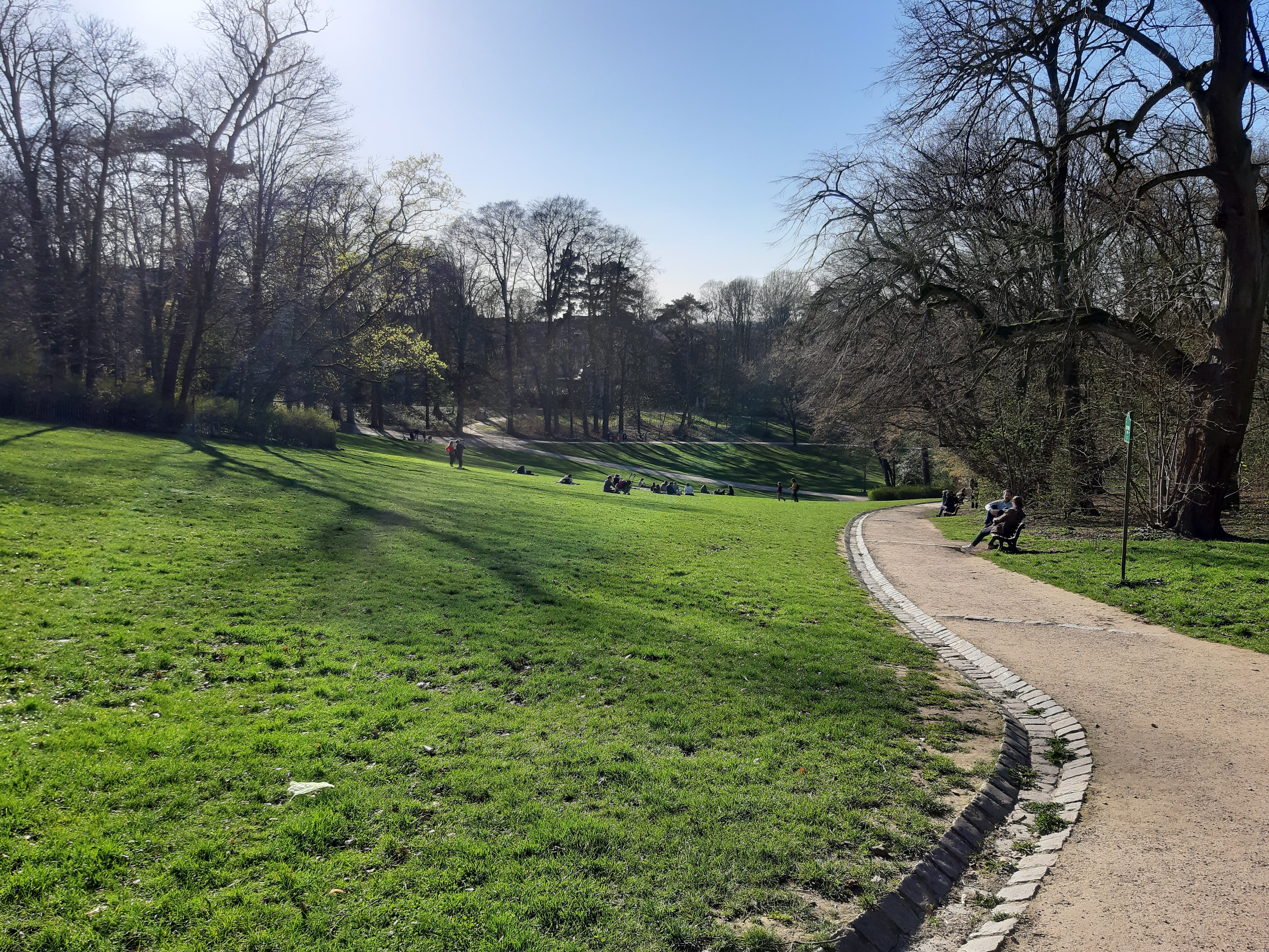
- A view of Wolvendael Park
- Interactive map of Wolvendael Park
- Type: Public park
- Location: Uccle, Brussels-Capital Region, Belgium
- Coordinates: 50°47′56″N 4°20′42″E
- Area: 14.5 ha (36 acres)
- Created: 18th century
- Status: Open year-round

Wolvendael Park (French: Parc de Wolvendael; Dutch: Wolvendaelpark) is an urban public park of 14.5 ha (36 acres) in the municipality of Uccle in Brussels, Belgium. Its origins date back to the 18th century as the grounds surrounding a country house of the same name, built in the neoclassical style.

== Toponymy ==
The name is of Flemish origin and is not derived from the Dutch word wolven ("wolves"), despite common assumptions. It is generally interpreted as meaning "valley (dael) at the bend (wolf or wolve)", referring to a meander in the valley of the Ukkelbeek.

== History ==
The earliest known reference dates from 1209, when the Cartulary of Affligem Abbey, published by Edgard de Marneffe, mentioned "Terram que woluesdal vocatur", referring to a site named Wolvendael near a bend in the valley of the Ukkelbeek.

From the 17th century onwards, the site appears as a pleasure estate, although little is known about its early ownership. In the early 18th century, the domain belonged to Jean-François Slijpen, who sold it in 1715 to Eugène-Henri Fricx. He is believed to have built a villa on the site. In 1733, the estate passed to Thomas de Fraula, during which time it comprised gardens, orchards, and woodland.

In the 19th century, the estate changed hands several times and underwent significant development. In 1810, the Bourgeois Guillaume Vanderborcht acquired the property, and it is likely that the present château dates from this period, although some sources suggest an earlier construction date. The estate was subsequently owned by Charles, Duke of Looz-Corswarem, around 1815, when the castle served as his residence. In 1826, it was there that his daughter Caroline married José de la Riva Agüero, the former president of Peru.

The estate was later acquired by Jacques-André Coghen, Belgium's first Minister of Finance, who commissioned the construction of an orangery on the site of the original country house. On 14 July 1877, the reception and banquet for the wedding of Don Fulco Beniamino Ruffo di Calabria, grandfather of Queen Paola, and Laure Mosselman du Chenoy, granddaughter of Jacques-André Coghen, were held at the estate.

From around 1887, the domain passed to Charles-Georges-Constantin Balser, a German banker and financier. At the end of 1909, it was acquired by Baron Léon Janssen, director of the Société Générale de Belgique and president of the executive committee of the Brussels International Exposition of 1910. Janssen enlarged the château, even if it meant losing its symmetry, and expanded the park to more than 20 ha (49 acres), shaping the estate into its current form. He also transferred an 18th-century Louis XV pavilion, originally built in Amsterdam by Aron de Pinto, to the estate.

On 21 April 1921, the municipality of Uccle purchased the estate, opening it to the public. The château was repurposed for cultural use, while the park became a public space hosting performances and events, including in the open-air theatre. In the following decades, the site was progressively integrated into the municipality's cultural and social life, with various installations, monuments, and events added. It was classified as a protected site in 1972.

On 25–26 January 1990, the Burns' Day Storm swept across Belgium. The park was affected by the storm, with trees, kiosks, and sheds uprooted. The mini-golf course, a long-standing feature of the park, located in its lower section near the entrance, was also destroyed, and did not reopen thereafter.

== Gallery ==
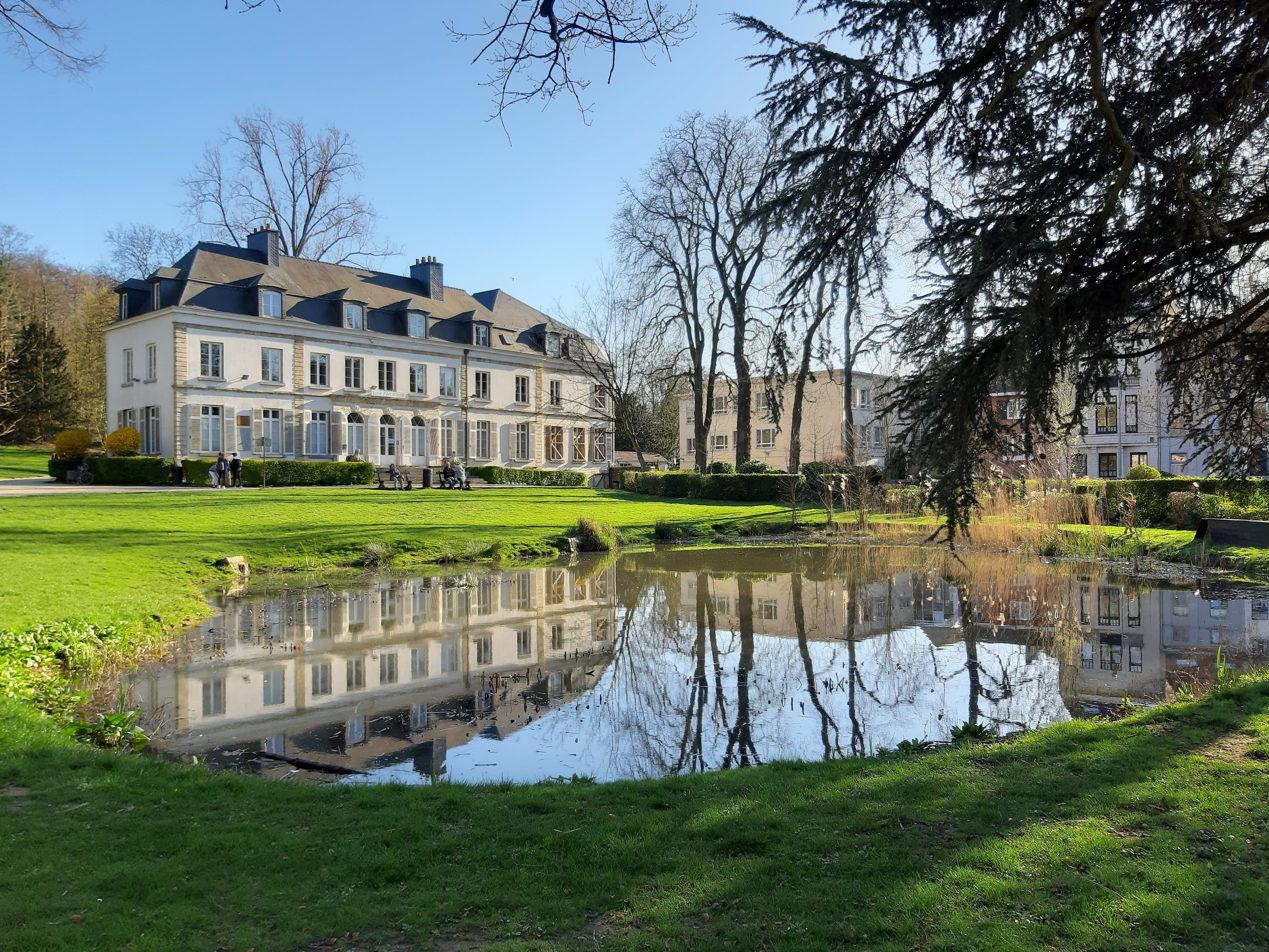
Wolvendael Château

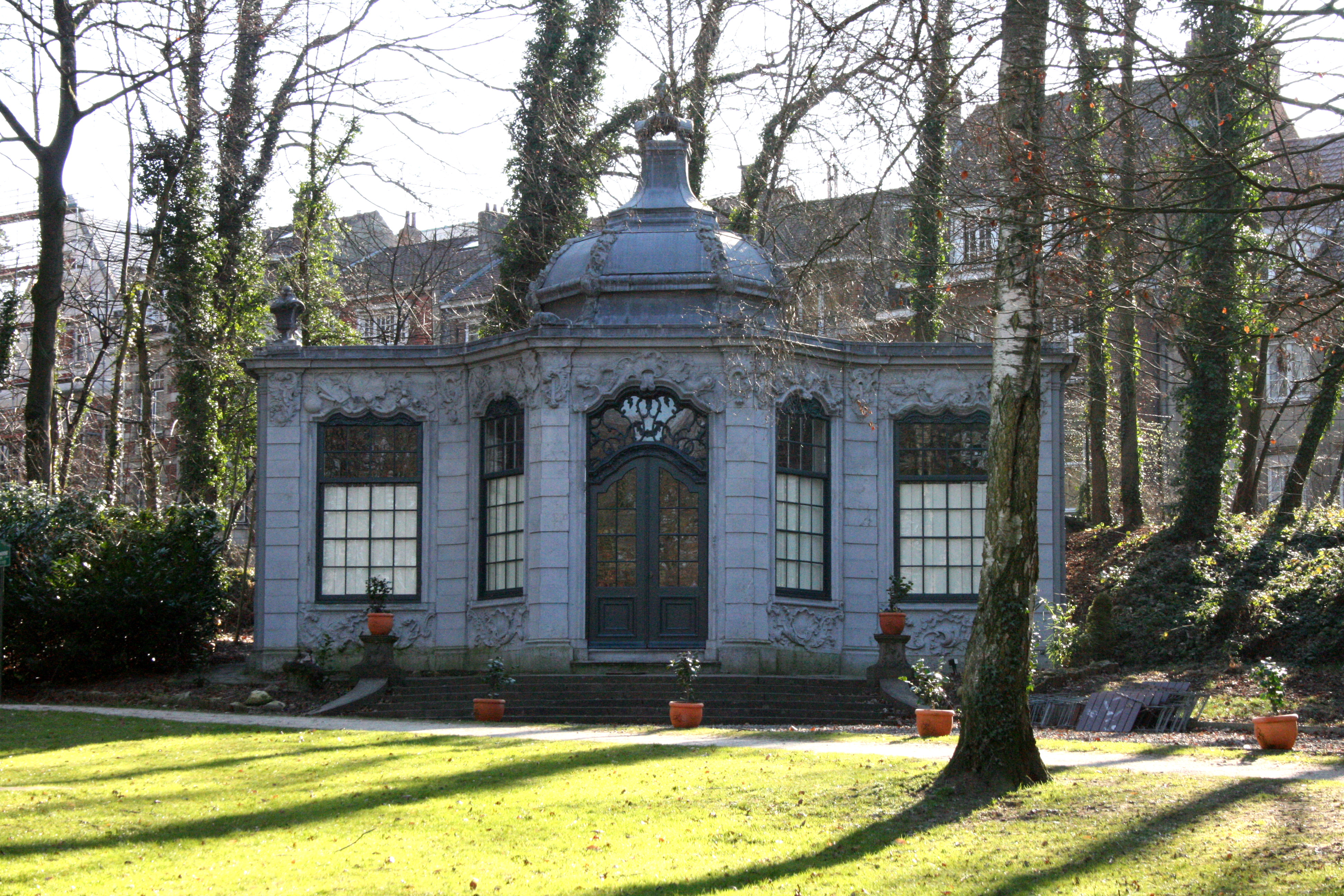
Louis XV pavilion

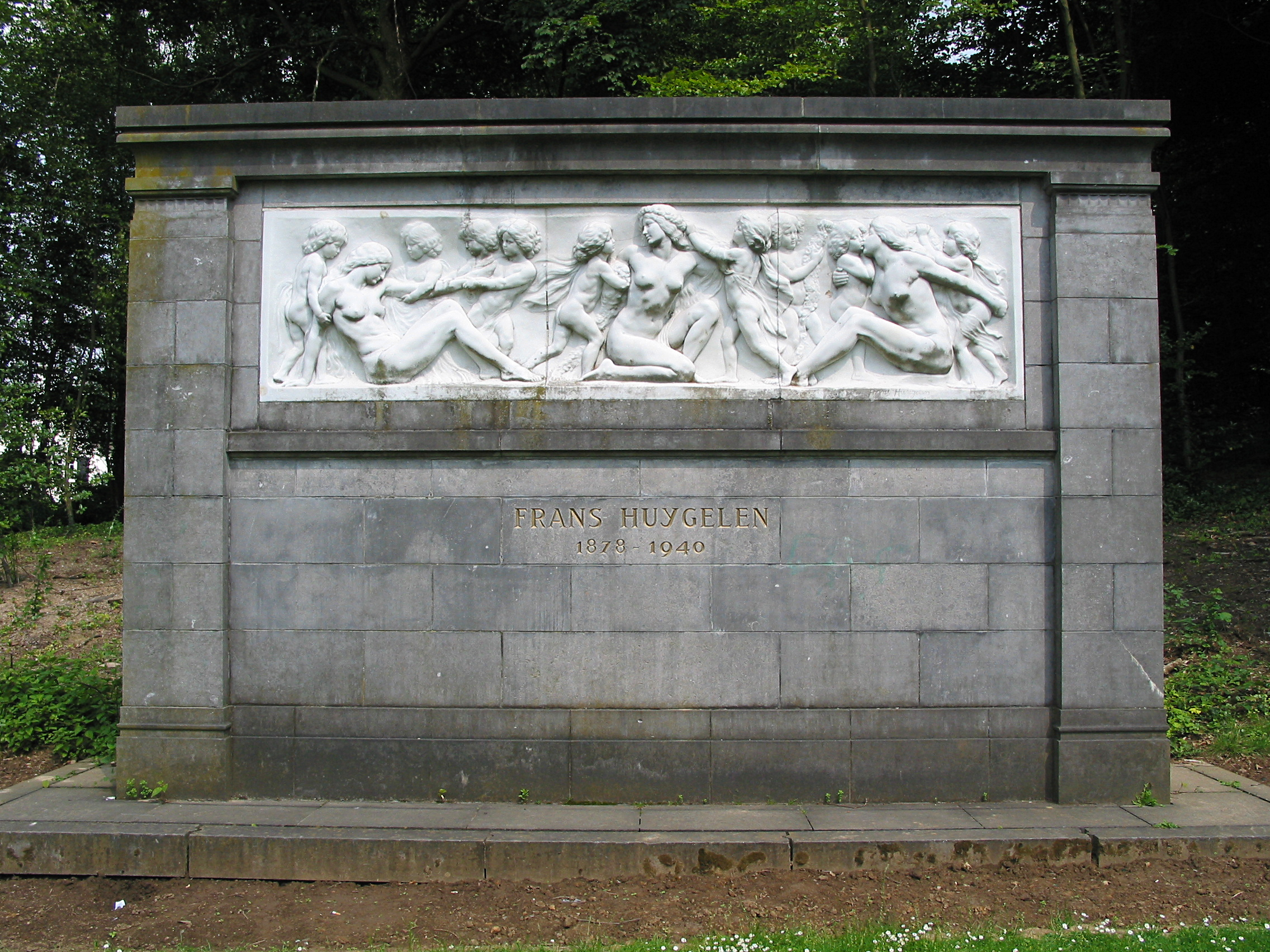
The Allegory of Spring by Frans Huygelen (1924)

== See also ==
- List of parks and gardens in Brussels
- History of Brussels
- Belgium in the long nineteenth century
