= Meunier Museum =

Art museum in Brussels, Belgium

- Musée Meunier (French); Meunier Museum (Dutch)
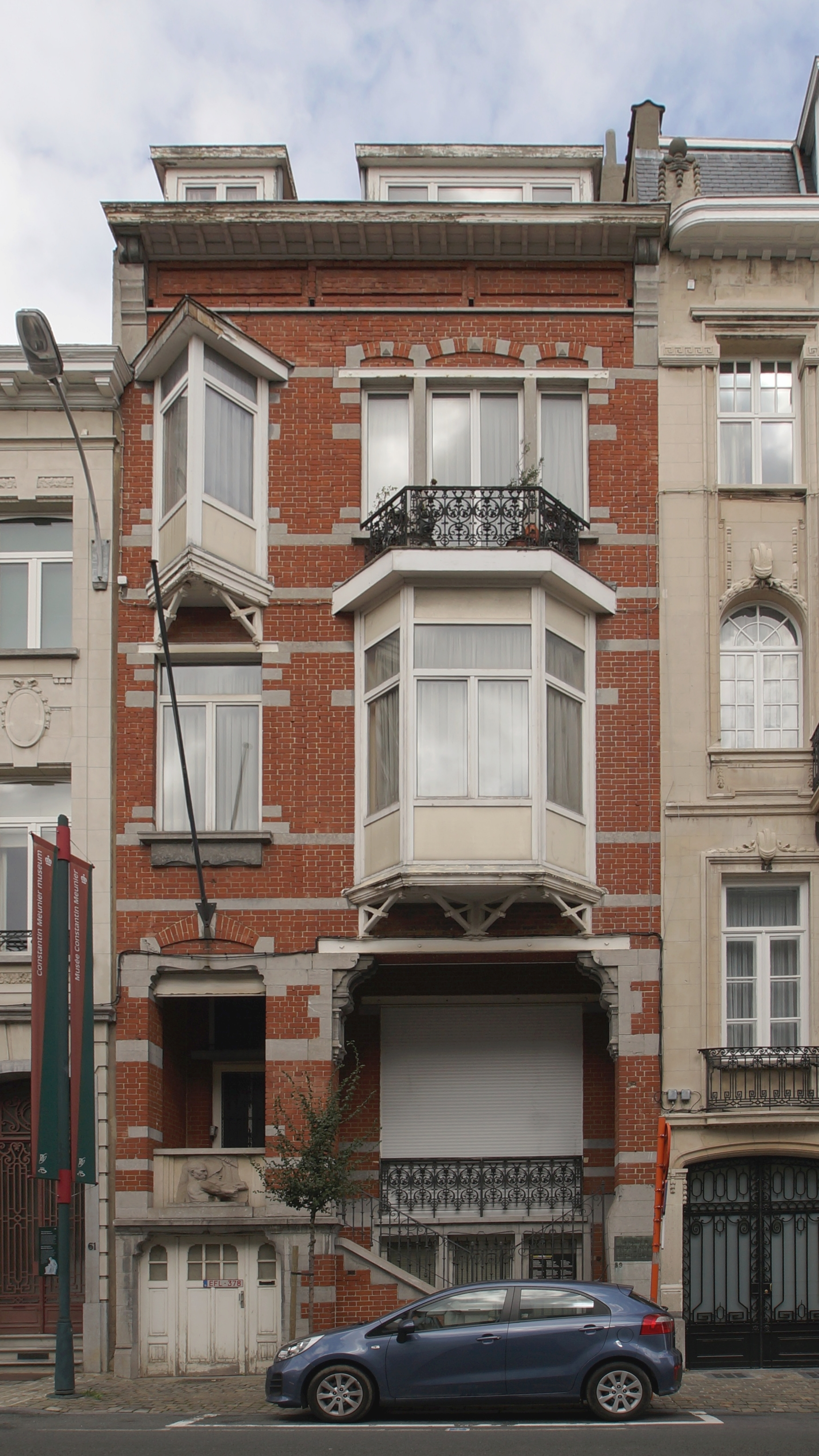
- Exterior of the museum
- Interactive fullscreen map
- Former name: Constantin Meunier Museum
- Location: Rue de l'Abbaye / Abdijstraat 59, 1050 Ixelles, Brussels-Capital Region, Belgium
- Coordinates: 50°49′09″N 4°22′02″E
- Type: Art museum
- Website: www.fine-arts-museum.be/en/museums/musee-meunier-museum

The Meunier Museum (French: Musée Meunier; Dutch: Meunier Museum), formerly the Constantin Meunier Museum (French: Musée Constantin Meunier; Dutch: Constantin Meunier Museum), is an art museum in Ixelles, a municipality of Brussels, Belgium, dedicated to the work of the realist painter and sculptor Constantin Meunier. It is one of the constituent museums of the Royal Museums of Fine Arts of Belgium.

The museum is located at 59, rue de l'Abbaye/Abdijstraat, in the house where Meunier lived and worked for the last five years of his life, between 1900 and 1905.

== History ==
The Meunier Museum is located in Constantin Meunier's former house and workshop at 59, rue de l'Abbaye/Abdijstraat, in the southern municipality of Ixelles. Meunier had the house-studio built towards the end of his life. The house was acquired by the Belgian state in 1936 and opened to the public in 1939. Since 1986, it has been attached to the Royal Museums of Fine Arts of Belgium, and subsequently renovated.

== Collection ==
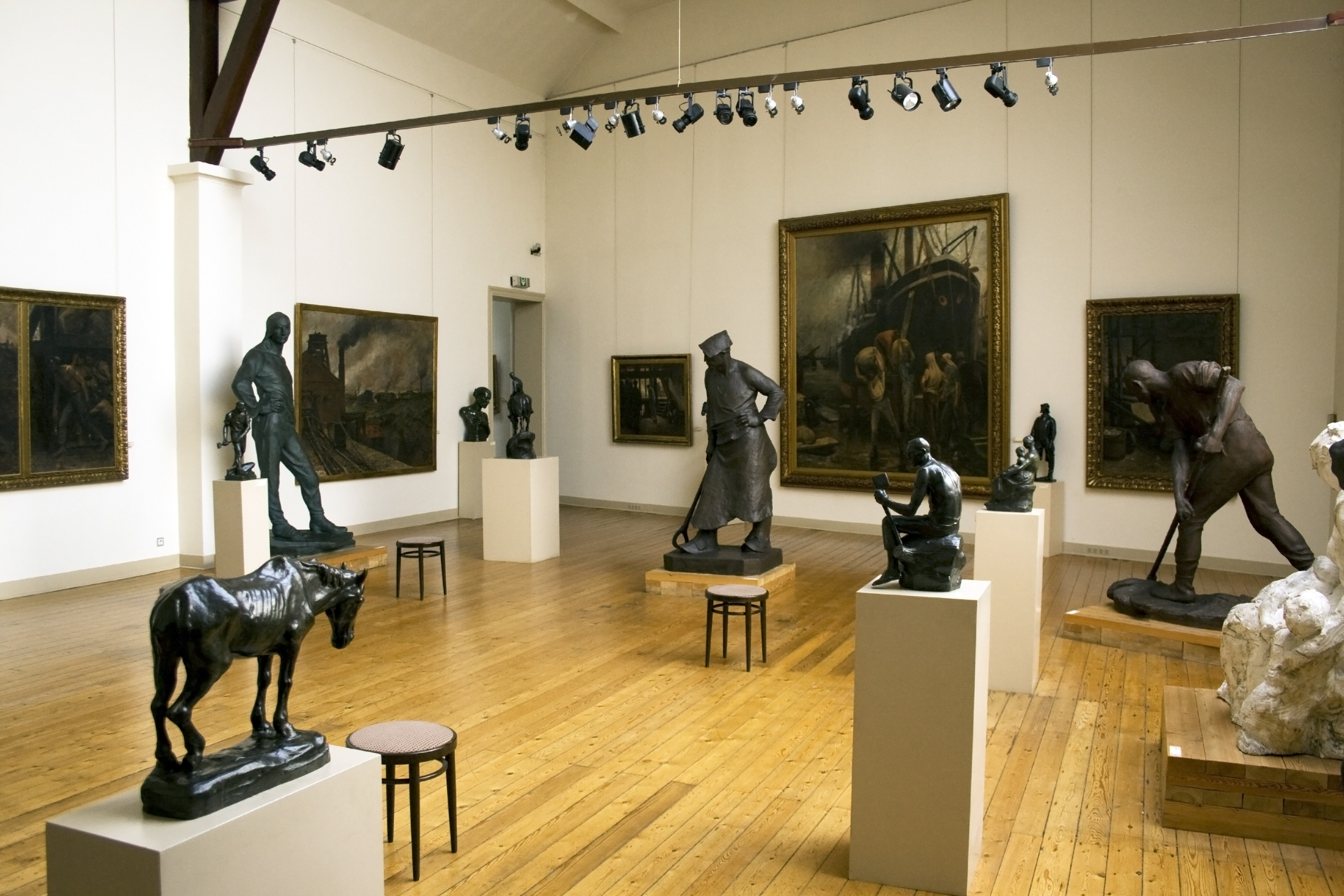
Main hall

The museum houses some 700 works and documents by Meunier, of which 150 are on display, including paintings like Removal of a Broken Crucible and sculptures like The Hammerer. The collection focuses particularly on the realist artist's output between 1875 and 1905, during which time his work focused on Belgium's industrial, political and social aspects.

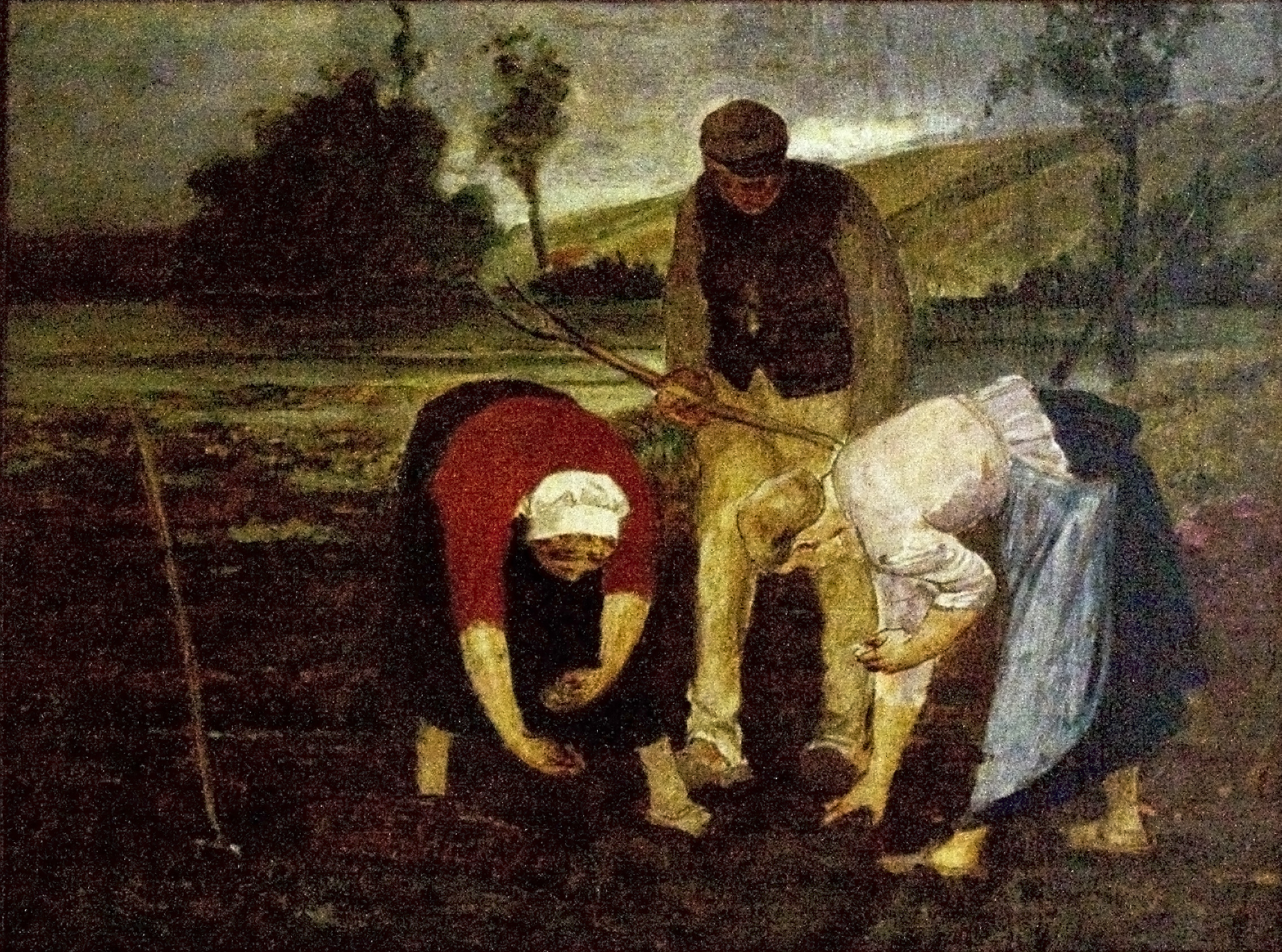
Potato Diggers

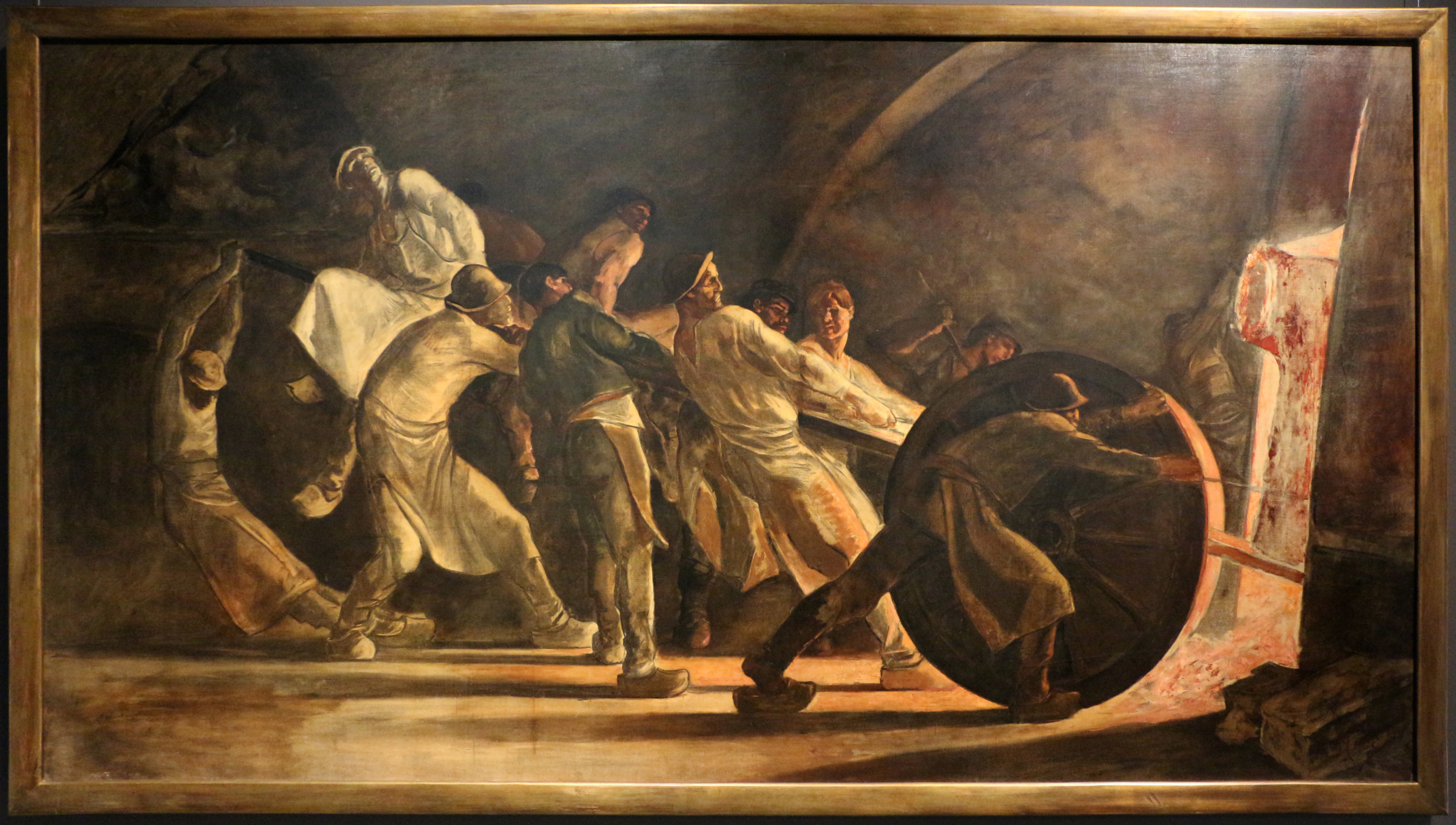
Removal of a Broken Crucible

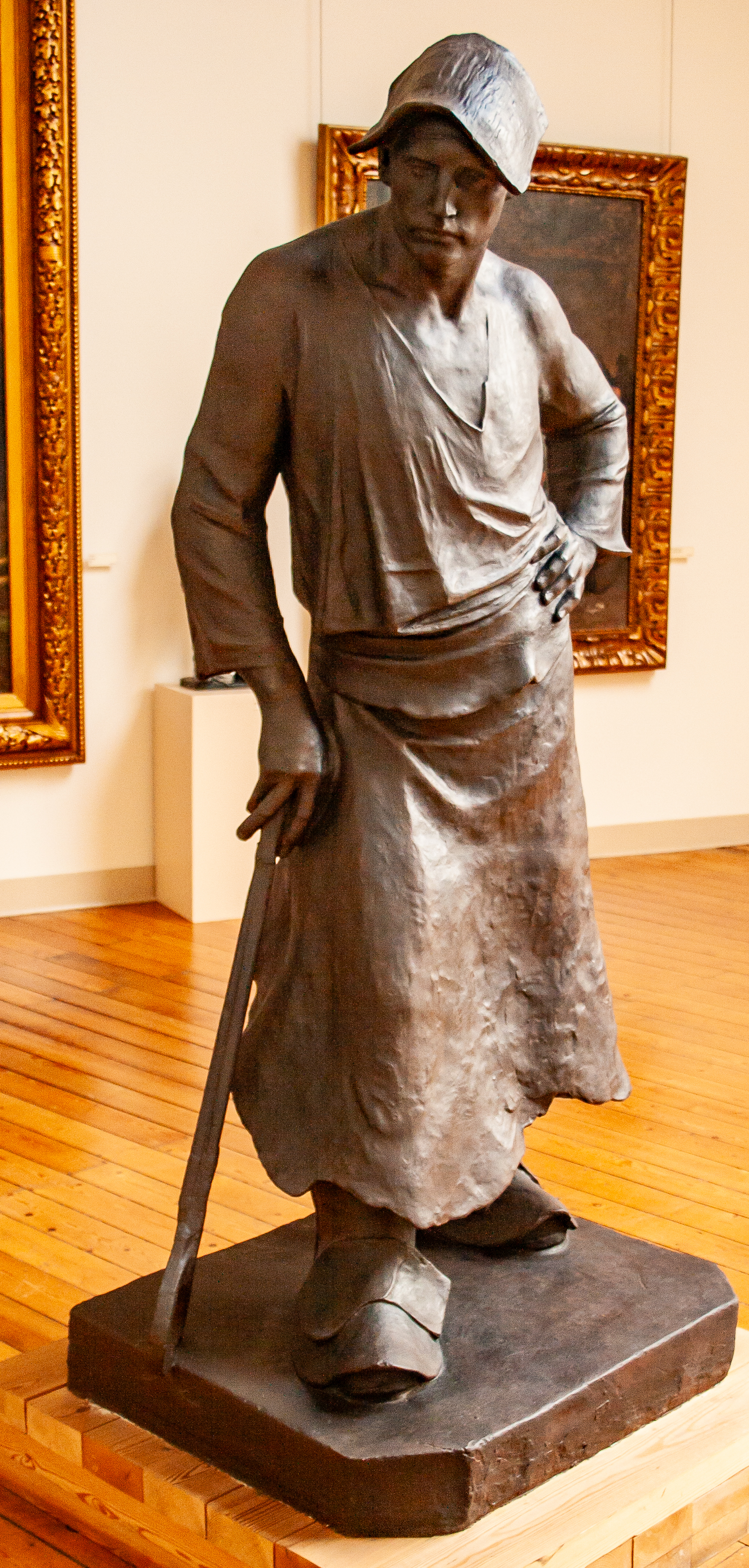
The Hammerer

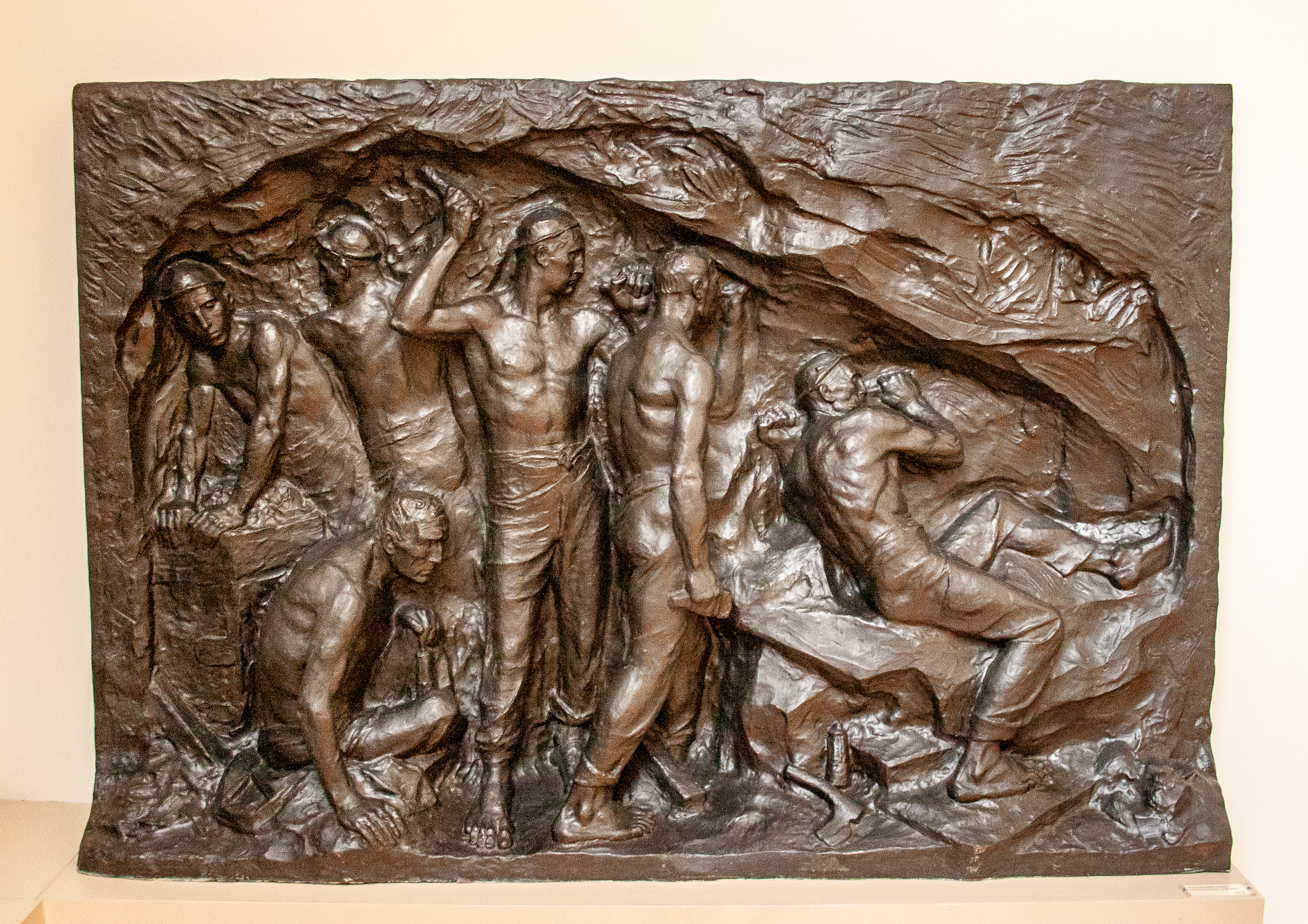
The Mine (or Monument to Work)

== See also ==
- List of museums in Brussels
- List of single-artist museums
- Culture of Belgium
- Belgium in the long nineteenth century
