= Chaussée de Charleroi =

Thoroughfare in Brussels, Belgium

Chaussée de Charleroi (French); Charleroisesteenweg (Dutch)
- Charleroise Steenweg (Dutch)
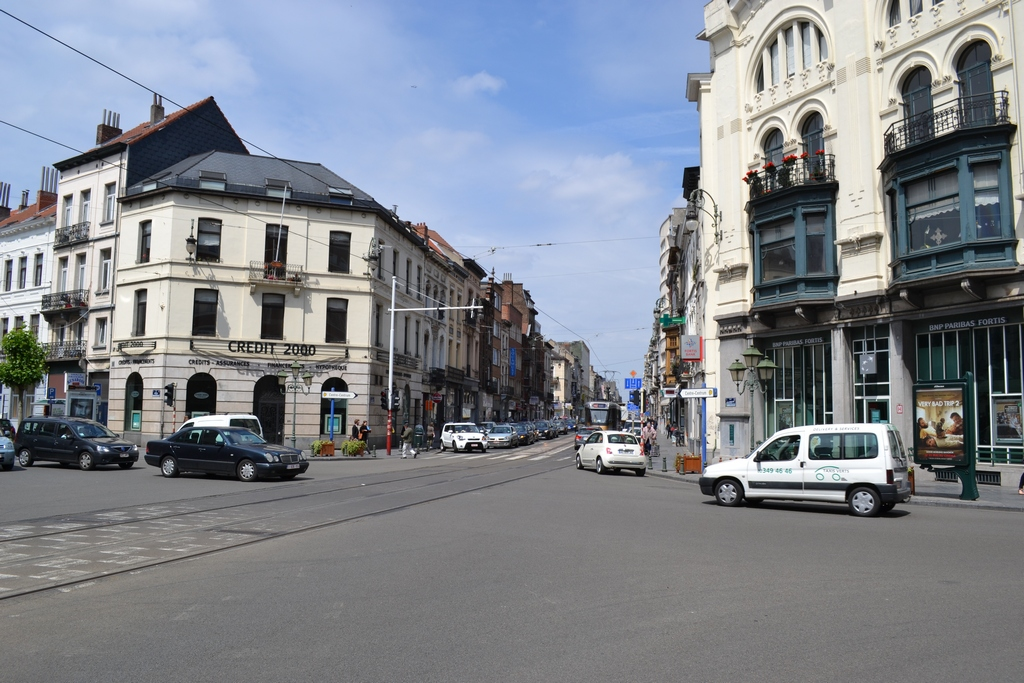
- View of the Ma Campagne crossroad with the Chaussée de Charleroi/Charleroisesteenweg

- Location within Brussels Location within Belgium
- Namesake: Charleroi
- Type: Chaussee
- Location: City of Brussels and Saint-Gilles, Brussels-Capital Region, Belgium
- Postal code: 1000, 1060
- Coordinates: 50°49′43″N 4°21′20″E

The Chaussée de Charleroi (French, pronounced [ʃo.se d(ə) ʃaʁ.lə.ʁwa]) or Charleroisesteenweg (Dutch, pronounced [ʃɑr.lə.rwaː.səˌsteːn.ʋɛx]) is a major street in Brussels, Belgium, running through the municipalities of Saint-Gilles and the City of Brussels. It connects the Place Stéphanie/Stefanieplein in the City of Brussels to the Ma Campagne crossroad in Saint-Gilles. It forms the N261 road with the Avenue Brugmann/Brugmannlaan, the Rue de Stalle/Stallestraat and the Rue Prolongée de Stalle/Verlengde Stallestraat. It is named after the city of Charleroi (Wallonia).

Many bars, restaurants, hotels and shops are located on the Chaussée de Charleroi. The Brussels tram routes 92 and 97 also run on this street.

== See also ==
- List of streets in Brussels
- History of Brussels
- Belgium in the long nineteenth century
