= Josaphat Park =

Park in Schaerbeek, Belgium

- Parc Josaphat (French); Josaphatpark (Dutch)
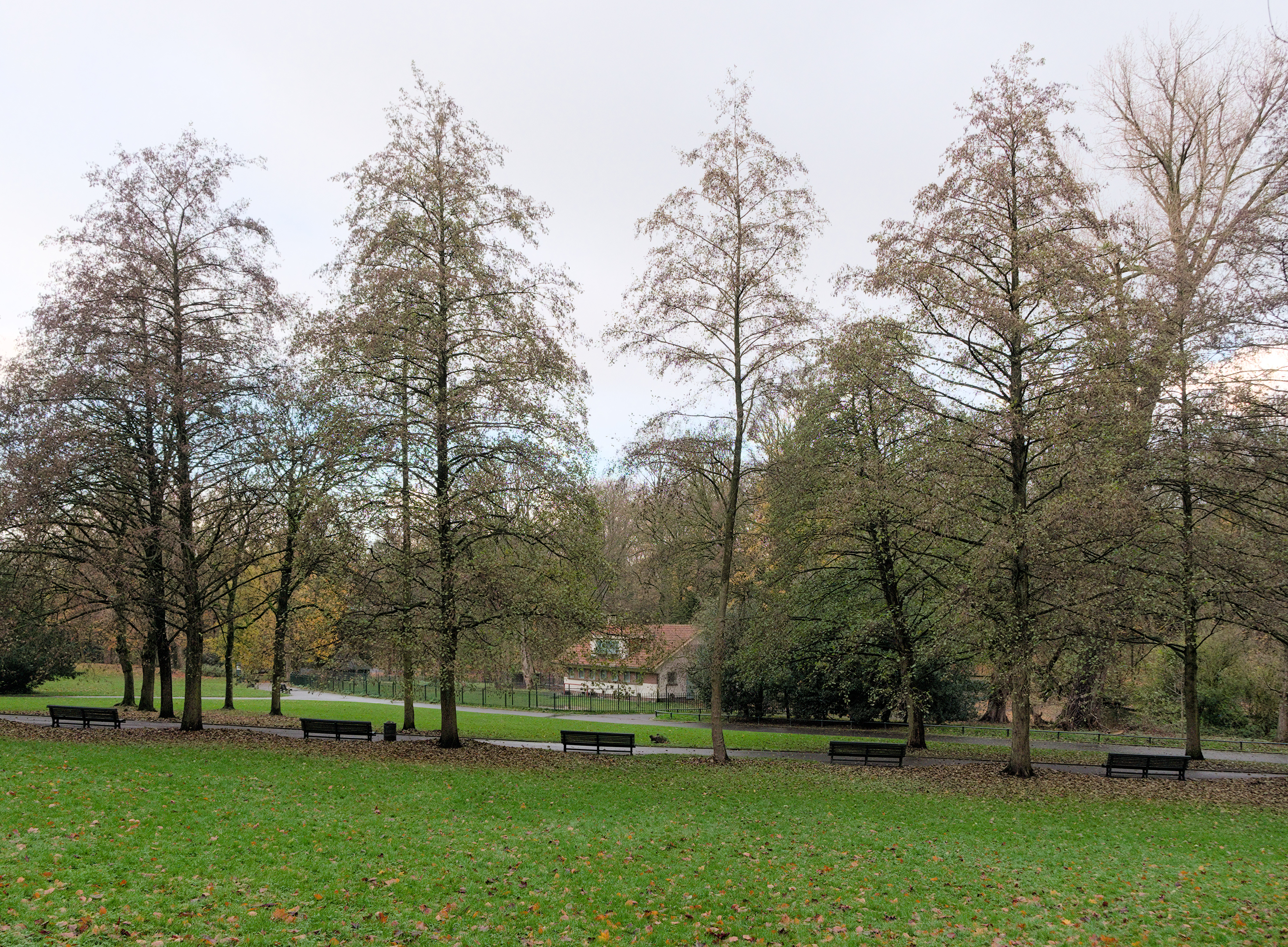
- A view of Josaphat Park
- Interactive map of Josaphat Park
- Type: Public park
- Location: Schaerbeek, Brussels-Capital Region, Belgium
- Coordinates: 50°51′44″N 4°23′06″E
- Area: 20 ha (49 acres)
- Created: 1901–1904
- Status: Open year-round

Josaphat Park (French: Parc Josaphat, pronounced [paʁk ʒozafa]; Dutch: Josaphatpark, pronounced [ˈjoːsafa(t)ˌpɑr(ə)k]) is an urban public park of 20 ha (49 acres) in the municipality of Schaerbeek in Brussels, Belgium. The hilly English-style park was designed between 1901 and 1904 by the landscape architect Edmond Galoppin, as part of an urban project including the Teniers-Josaphat district.

The park's outstanding feature is its string of ponds, fed by the Josaphat stream. Many rare trees (remnants of a botanical garden) and animals thrive in this urban environment. The municipal stadium that was formerly used by the football club K.V.V. Crossing Elewijt lies in the park's north-western corner. There is also a primary school (Chazal School), a tennis club (R.T.C. Lambermont), the municipal greenhouses, a petting zoo, two playgrounds, a minigolf course, an archery range, three guinguettes (La Laiterie, La Buvette Saint-Sebastiaan, and La Guinguette Populeir), a bandstand, a food kiosk (Josaphine's), and many sculptures adorn the park.

== History ==
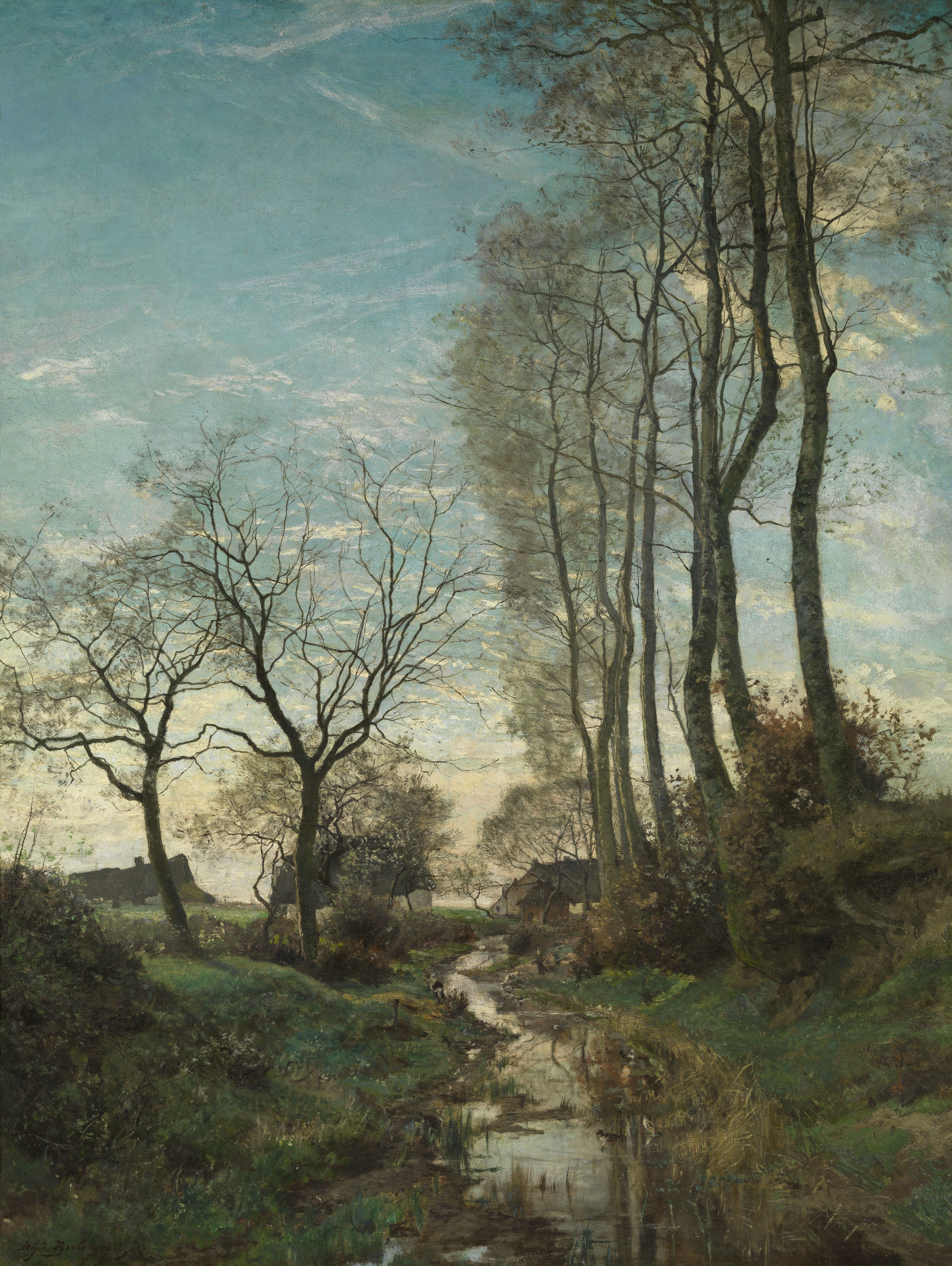
Josaphat Valley at Schaarbeek, Hippolyte Boulenger, 1868

The origin of Josaphat Park lies in the valley carved out by a tributary of the Maelbeek, the Josaphat stream, formerly known as the Roodebeek or Roodenbeek. The stream was fed by several springs, the most famous of which is still known today as the Fontaine d'Amour or Minnebron (see below). According to tradition, the park's current name comes from the striking resemblance between this valley and the Valley of Josaphat in the Holy Land, noted by a pilgrim returning from Palestine in 1574. (Note: The waterfall that fed a mill and nine ponds reminded him of the Kidron torrent in the Garden of Olives.) On a hill near the valley, nicknamed Heyligenbergh, he had a votive column erected as a memento of his journey and his discovery, with a Latin inscription inviting passers-by to meditate on this similarity. The column was restored in 1666, when a Flemish text was added to it, but it was destroyed around 1792–93 by French revolutionaries known as the sans-culottes.

By the 19th century, the Josaphat Valley had become a popular recreational area for Brussels' inhabitants, a remnant of the old Linthout forest that ran along the Chaussée de Louvain/Leuvensesteenweg and extended to the borders of the current municipality of Auderghem. From 1898, the municipality of Schaerbeek expressed its intention to create a park there and set about buying back the plots from 197 owners by mutual agreement. At that time, the valley consisted of private properties and estates, the largest of which belonged to the widow Martha, who owned land, fields and a mansion there. She put many of the trees up for sale with a commitment to cut them down, in order to have the land deforested and re-parcelled. King Leopold II, however, sensitive to the valley's aesthetic appeal, purchased the trees without cutting them down and donated them to Schaerbeek's municipal authorities. The widow Martha refused to budge and demanded that the felling clause be applied. Only an expropriation procedure overcame her resistance.

The park's creation was finally decreed during the municipal council of 6 August 1901. Its development was entrusted to the landscape architect Edmond Galoppin of Melsbroek and the municipal engineer Gaston Bertrand. Galoppin strove to give the park a picturesque appearance by creating a rockery in its lower part and irregular paths winding around a string of ponds. On 26 June 1904, the park was inaugurated in the presence of Leopold II. At its opening, it covered an area of 4 ha (9.9 acres), which was gradually increased to 20 ha (49 acres) through new acquisitions. In 1910, Middelborch Castle was demolished, which would later make way for an archery range. Over time, the park was enriched with new equipment and facilities. In 1914, a sports and games area was inaugurated; two archery clubs (Saint-Sebastiaan and Monplaisir) were set up there in 1919 and 1921 respectively. In 1923, an open-air school was founded near the park so local schoolchildren could learn lessons from observing nature. In 1954, a miniature golf course was laid out by the landscape architect René Pechère.

The park was designated through a royal decree issued on 31 December 1974. It underwent a major restoration between 2006 and 2011.

== Location and layout ==
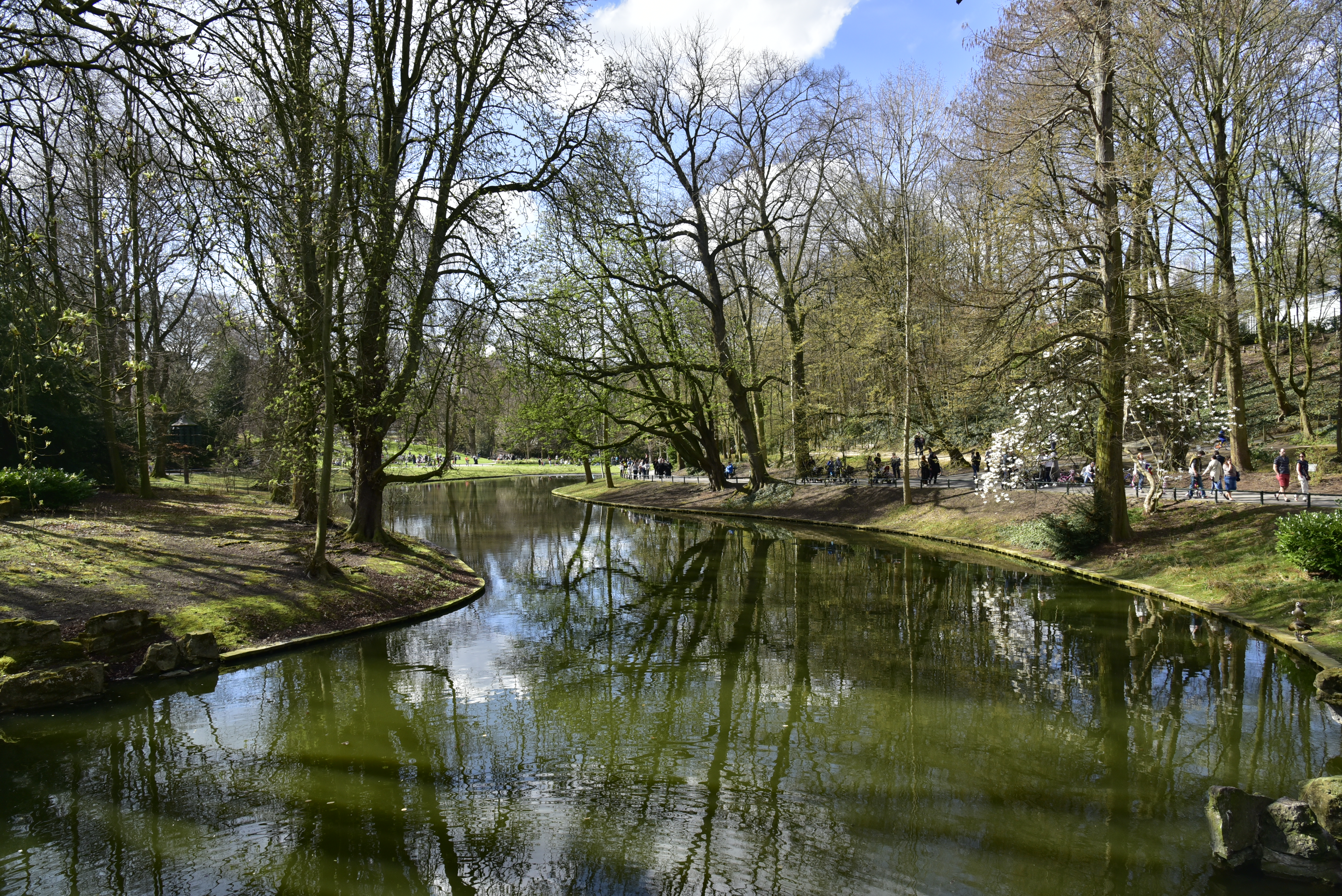
Larger pond

Josaphat Park is located at the centre of Schaerbeek, between the Chaussée de Haecht/Haachtsesteenweg to the north and the Avenue Chazal/Chazallaan to the south. It is bordered to the east by the Boulevard Lambermont/Lambermontlaan, and to the west by the Avenue Ernest Renan/Ernest Renanlaan, the Avenue du Suffrage Universel/Algemeen Stemrechtlaan, the Avenue Voltaire/Voltairelaan, the Avenue des Azalées/Azalealaan and the Avenue Général Eisenhower/Generaal Eisenhowerlaan. The park is also crossed by the Avenue Louis Bertrand/Louis Bertrandlaan and the Avenue Ambassadeur Van Vollenhoven/Ambassadeur Van Vollenhovenlaan, as well as by the ring-road railway line.

The park does not have a homogeneous appearance. Cut by several roads and the railway line, its 20 ha (49 acres) are divided into three distinct zones. To the north, between the Boulevard Lambermont on the one hand, and the Avenue Louis Bertrand and the Avenue du Suffrage Universel on the other, the area is mainly devoted to sports and games. Further south is the large archery lawn, the park's most popular part. The hilly central part, laid out as an English-style public promenade, has undoubtedly remained the most picturesque. At the far end are three ponds in a row, the third of which ends in a rocky landscape with a cascading stream.

== Flora and fauna ==
=== Botanical and zoological garden ===
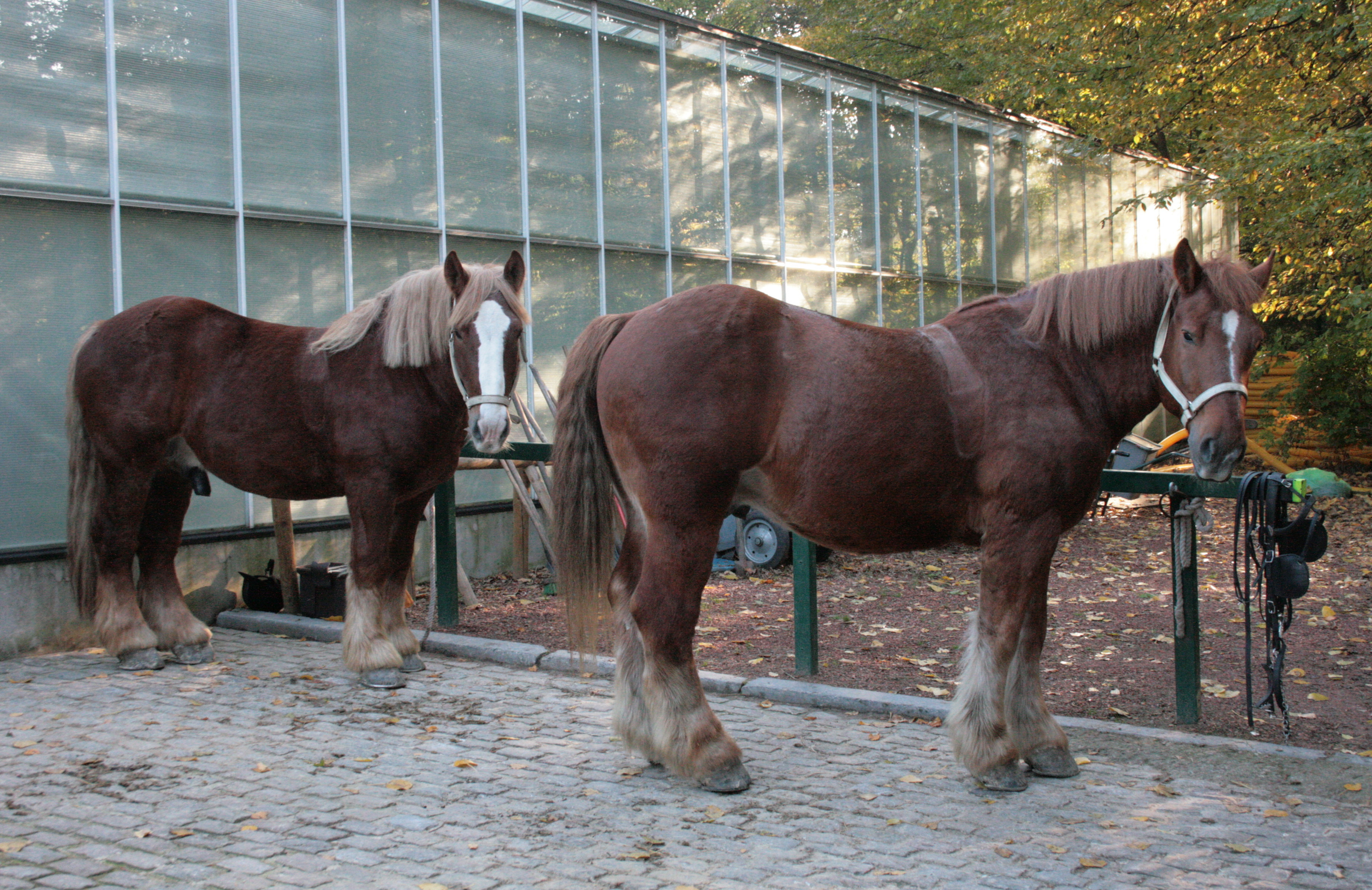
Ardennais horses

In keeping with the encyclopaedic spirit of the 19th century, Josaphat Park was conceived as a botanical and zoological garden. It has remained a botanical garden thanks partially to the variety of species it contains (e.g. lime trees, beeches, maples, oaks, ash trees, birches, plane trees, magnolias, catalpas, hawthorns, elms, chestnut trees, Canadian poplars, etc.) and partially to the presence of rarer specimens such as bald cypresses, tulip trees, Caucasian wingnuts and Ginkgo bilobas. A large plane tree is also listed among the most remarkable trees in Belgium. All that remains of the zoological garden is a small petting zoo, which includes a poultry yard (with ducks, peacocks, geese, waterhens, guinea fowl, etc.), a dovecote, as well as a donkey and horse enclosure. Traditional donkey rides in the park take place on weekends during the summer months.

=== Municipal greenhouses ===
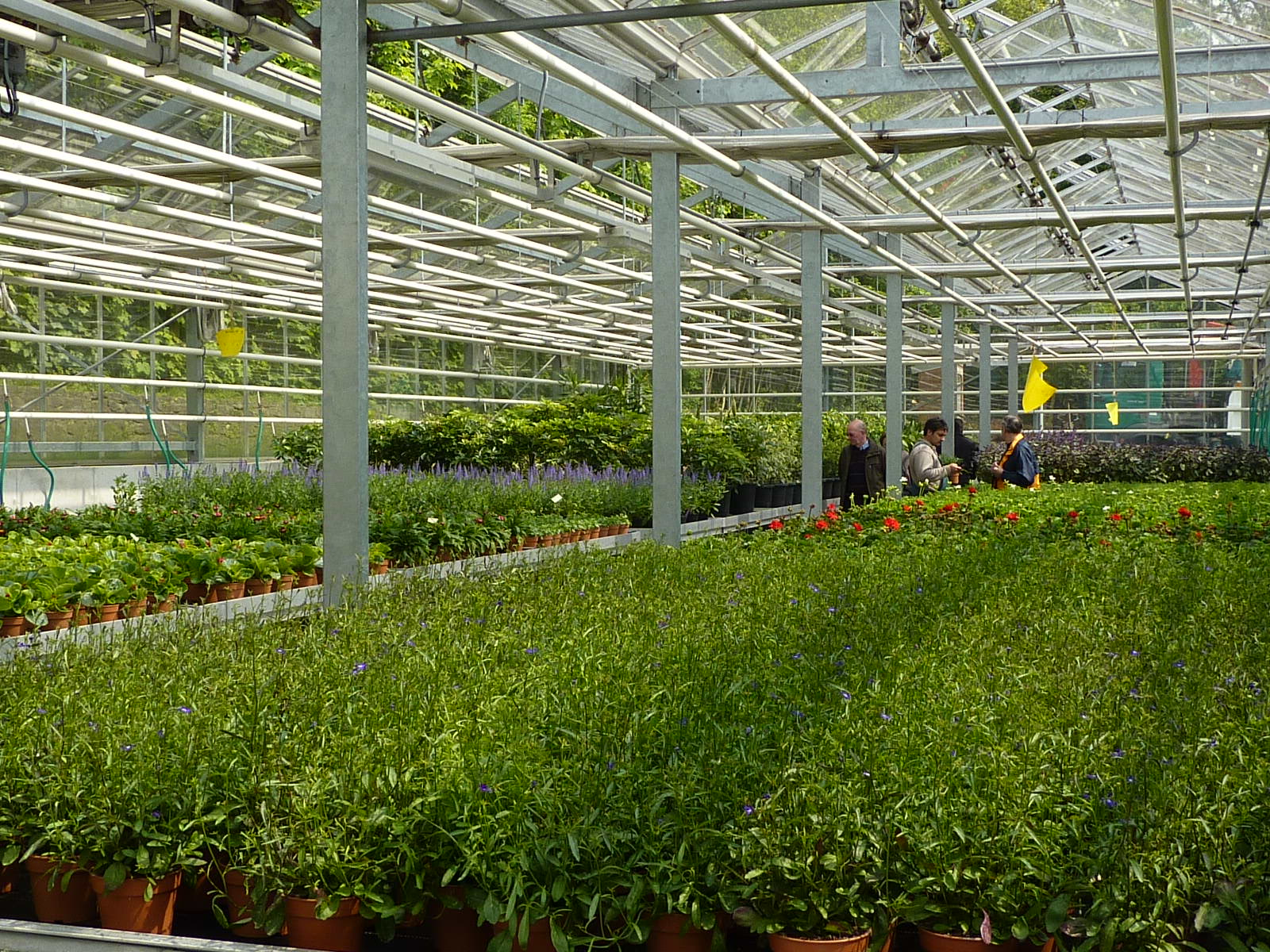
Municipal greenhouses

The municipal greenhouses are located at no. 411 boulevard Lambermont. Since 1909, municipal workers have grown more than 6,500 plants and flowers there. The current greenhouses were built in 2001 to replace old, non-automated greenhouses. These greenhouses are used to grow plants that serve either to embellish public spaces (e.g. flowerbeds, tubs, etc.) or to decorate the interiors of buildings for major municipal events (e.g. at the Municipal Hall, in schools, etc.). In addition to the cultivation areas, there is also an educational garden and a municipal vegetable garden on the greenhouses' site.

== Sports and recreation ==
=== Minigolf ===
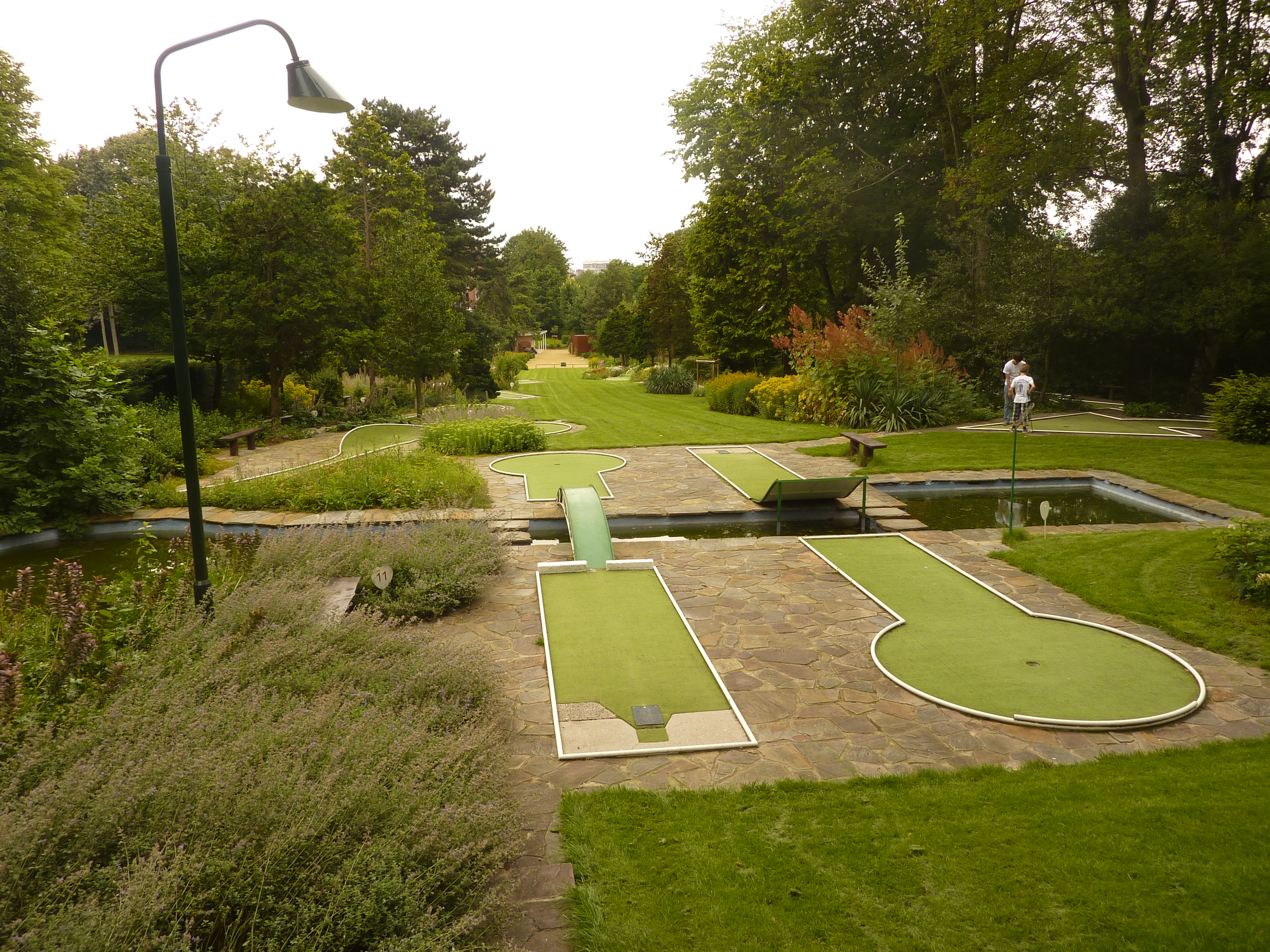
Schaerbeek's minigolf

On the western side of Josaphat Park, between the railway line and the Avenue Ambassadeur Van Vollenhoven, lies Schaerbeek's miniature golf course. It was built in the early 1950s and has eighteen holes. In 1952, the footballer Robert Gérard proposed to build a minigolf course on the piece of land along the railway line, where there were several vegetable gardens. The municipal council supported this idea. The minigolf course was designed by the landscape architect René Pechère and has been in operation since 1954. It was completely renovated after the summer of 2008. The grounds contain many plants, coniferous trees and flowering shrubs.

=== Municipal stadium ===
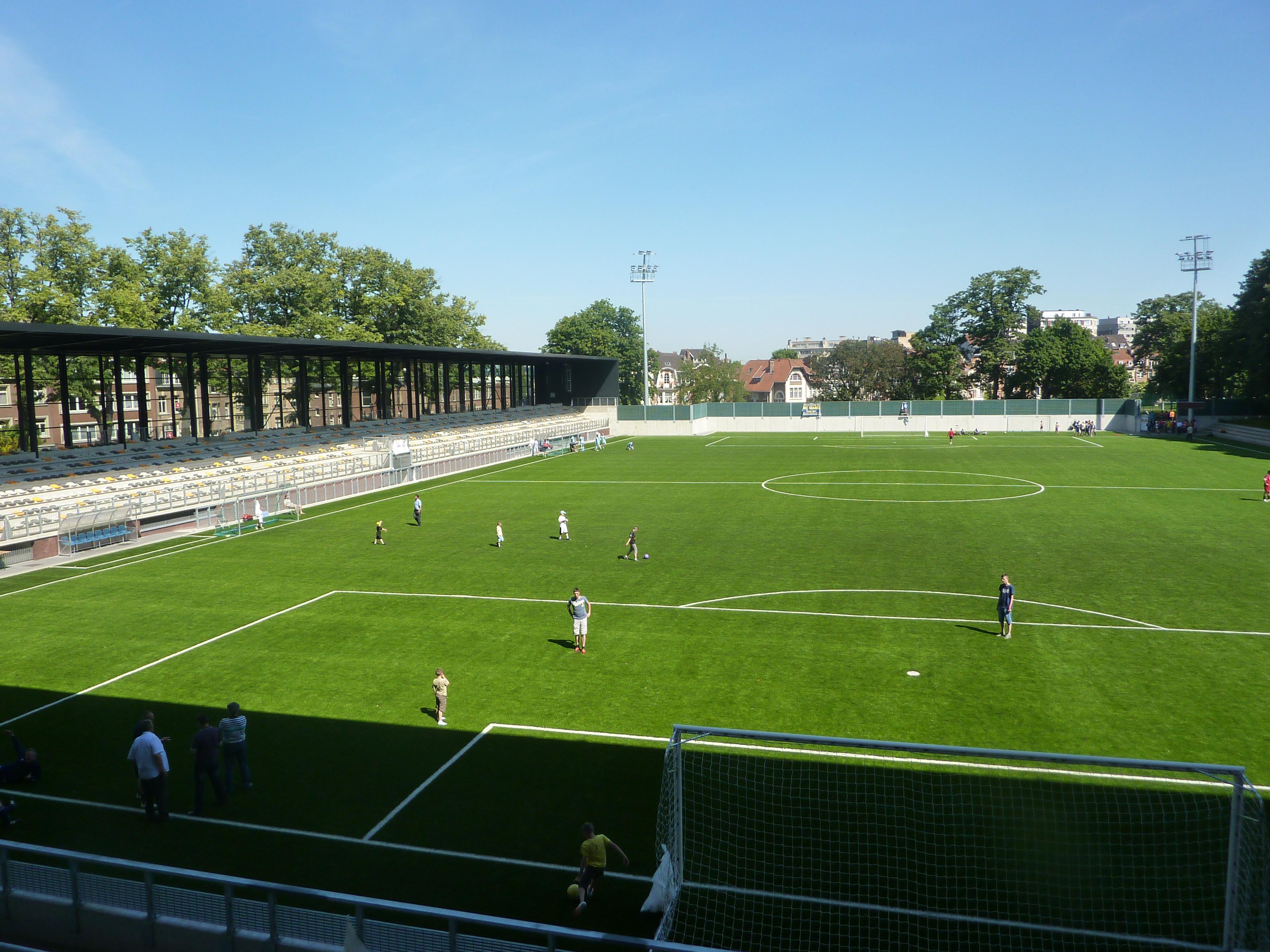
Municipal stadium

The park houses a multi-purpose stadium, formerly called the Crossing Stadium, in its north-western corner. Until 1969, this stadium hosted the matches of Royal Cercle Sportif (R. CS.) de Schaerbeek. The local football club then merged with Crossing de Molenbeek and took the name R. Crossing Club Schaerbeek. This club played until 1983 in the stadium to which it gave its name. The venue, with its large stand recognised as a listed monument, fell into disrepair and became a blight on the surrounding area. In 2013, the renovation and modernisation of the site was finally completed. Since then, the stadium has been home to Crossing Schaerbeek-Evere. In 1991, the club merged with V.V. Elewijt to form K.V.V. Crossing Elewijt.

=== Other activities ===
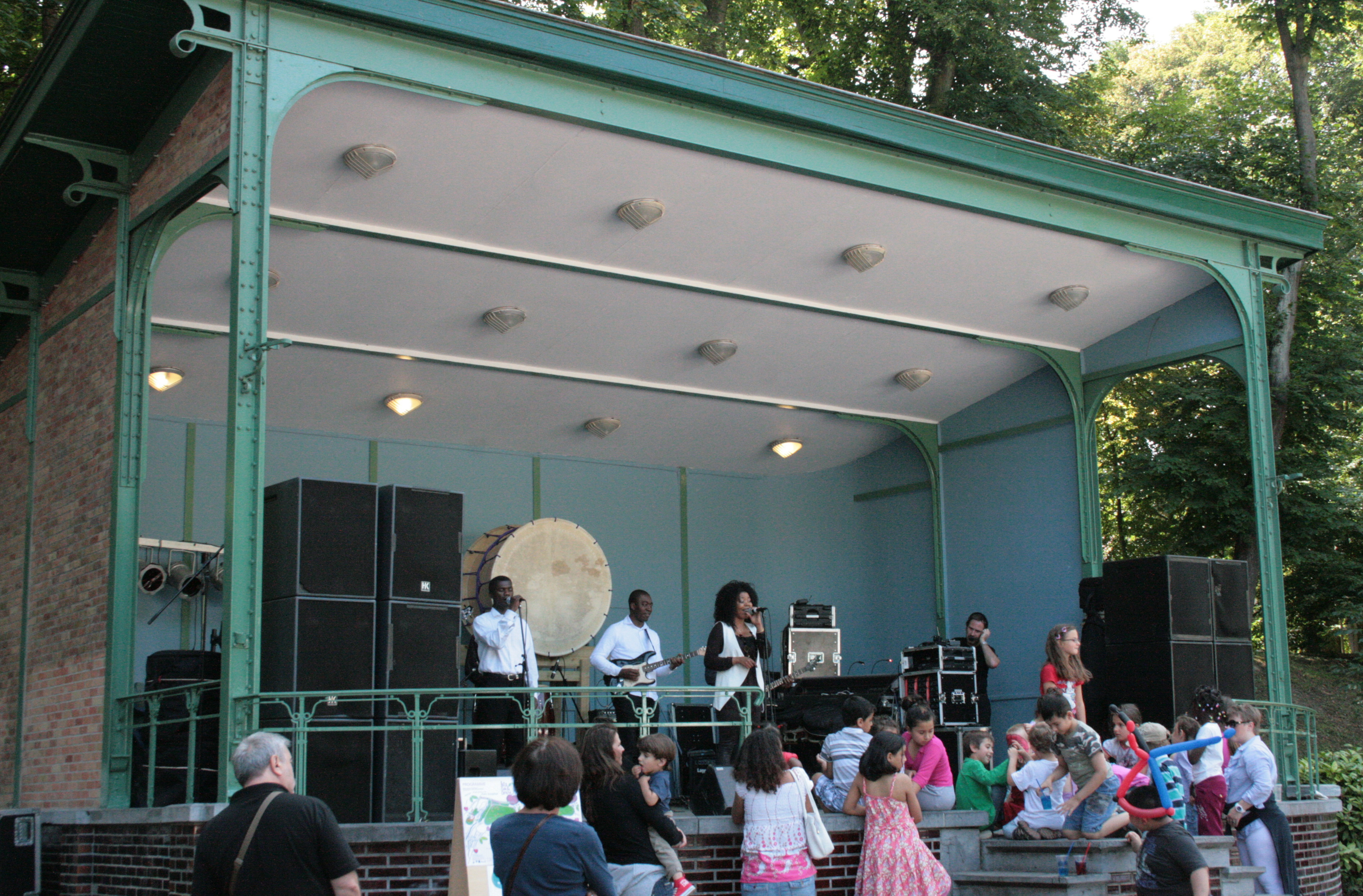
Bandstand

The large, walkable lawns are regularly used for archery training and competitions. An archery guild also has its facilities there. A pétanque court, skateboarding area, multi-sports ground and fitness trail are accessible to the public, while the football pitch, athletics track, as well as the tennis courts of the Royal Tennis Club (R.T.C.) Lambermont, are mainly reserved for clubs and schools. A large sandpit and a circular shelter welcome children and are a reminder that the Schaerbeek "beach" used to be there—a body of water surrounded by sandy banks.

The park's main bandstand stands on the site of the stables of the widow Martha's old château. Concerts are held there on Sundays in the summer and during festivals. La Laiterie, a guinguette (i.e. small tavern) in the heart of the park, offers live jazz concerts every Friday evening and jam sessions every Wednesday from 6 p.m. The Buvette Sint-Sebastiaan and La Guinguette Populeir offer a culinary break for visitors during their walks. In addition, the food kiosk Josaphine's provides a selection of savoury snacks, drinks and sweet treats, as well as picnic baskets.

== Buildings ==
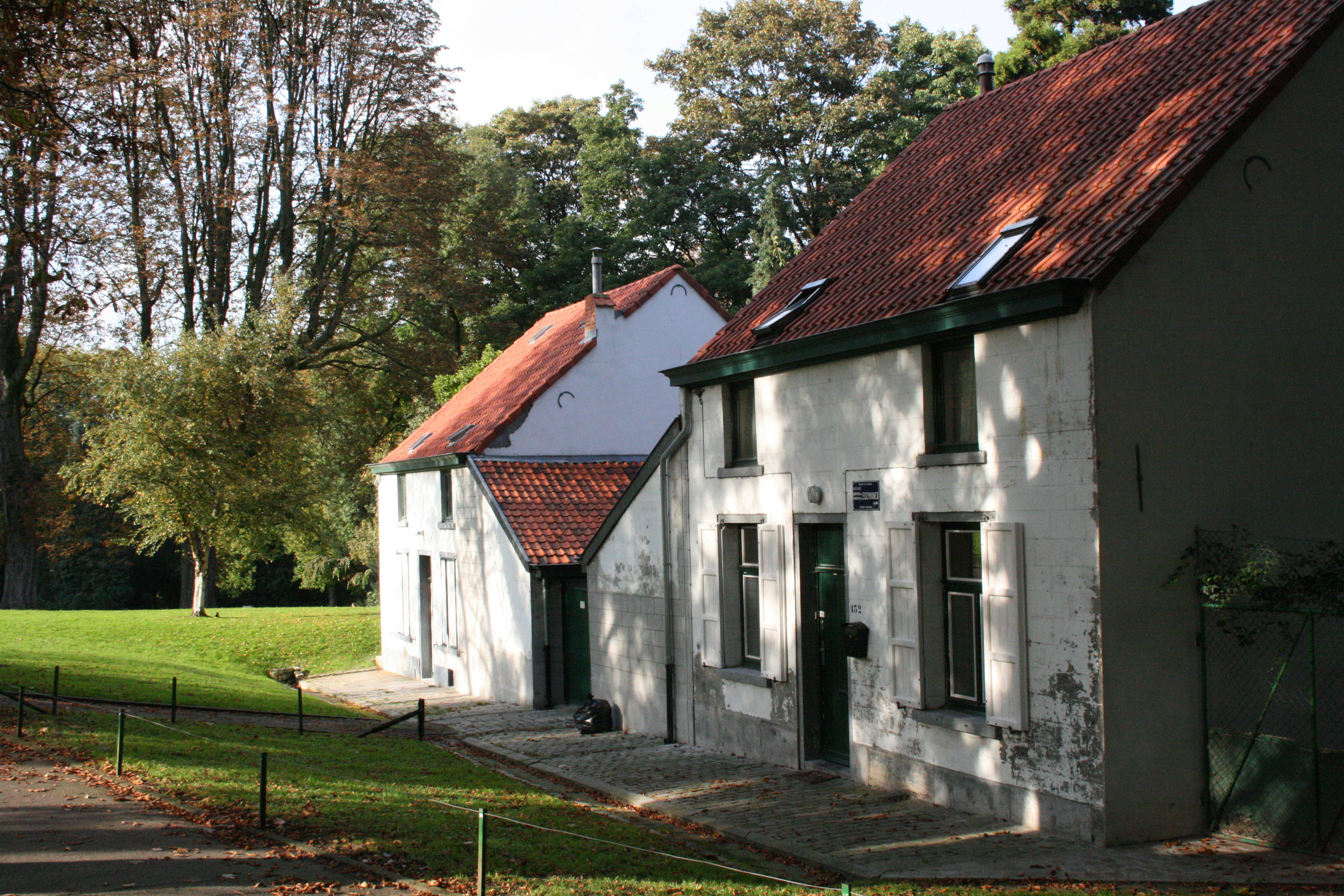
Schampaert houses

Three residential buildings are located in Josaphat Park, at nos. 130 and 132 avenue Général-Eisenhower and at no. 409 boulevard Lambermont. The first two, the Schampaert houses, are similar, mirrored neoclassical houses, probably built around 1880. Witnesses to the municipality's past, they now house the park's caretaker's lodge.

The park is also home to Chazal School, a primary special education school with around 140 pupils distributed across 12 classes. The infrastructure allows for courses and specific projects such as reading workshops, theatre, puppetry, mime, craft workshops, educational visits, speech therapy and psychomotor education workshops.

== Sculptures ==
Josaphat Park boasts a large collection of sculptures, including works by sculptors Jules Lagae, Victor Rousseau, Albert Desenfans, Edmond Lefever, Joseph Van Hamme, Eugène Canneel, Maurice De Korte, Jacques Nisot, and Jean Lecroart. Among the twenty or so sculptures that line its winding paths, there are effigies and busts of the poets Émile Verhaeren and Albert Giraud, the writers Hubert Krains and Georges Eekhoud, the composer Henri Wetz, the playwright Nestor Detière, and the painters Léon Frédéric and Oswald Poreau. The sculptural collection also includes several bronzes such as The Pruner (1895) and Eve and the Serpent (1890) by Desenfans, Cinderella by Lefever (1881), Boreas by Van Hamme (1904), Tijl Uylenspiegel and Cariatide by Canneel, Maternity by De Korte (1949), the Monument to Philippe Baucq by Nisot (1974), as well as the Monument to Edmond Galoppin by Lecroart (1921), erected in memory of the park's creator.

Josaphat Park's sculptures

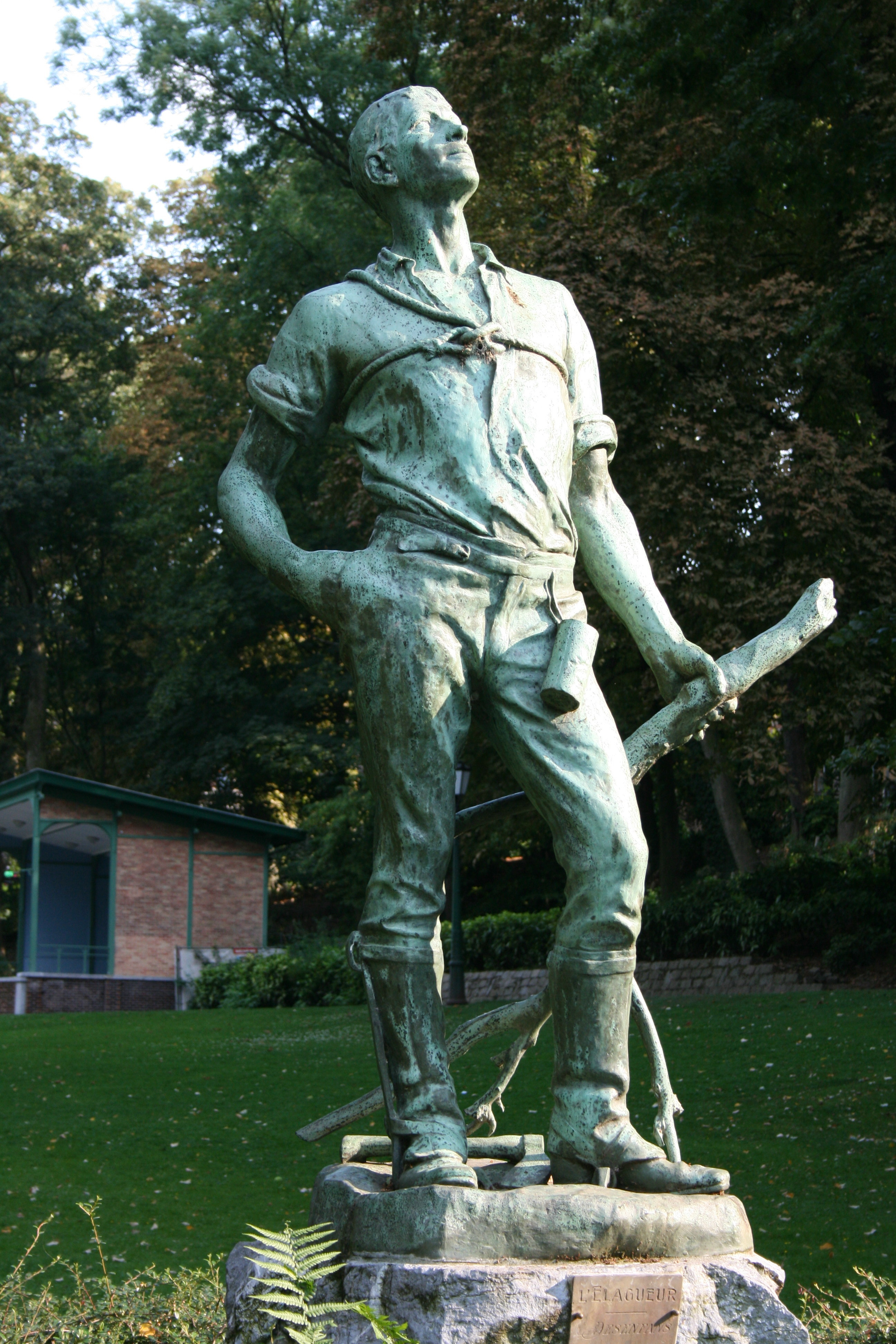
The Pruner by Albert Desenfans (1895)

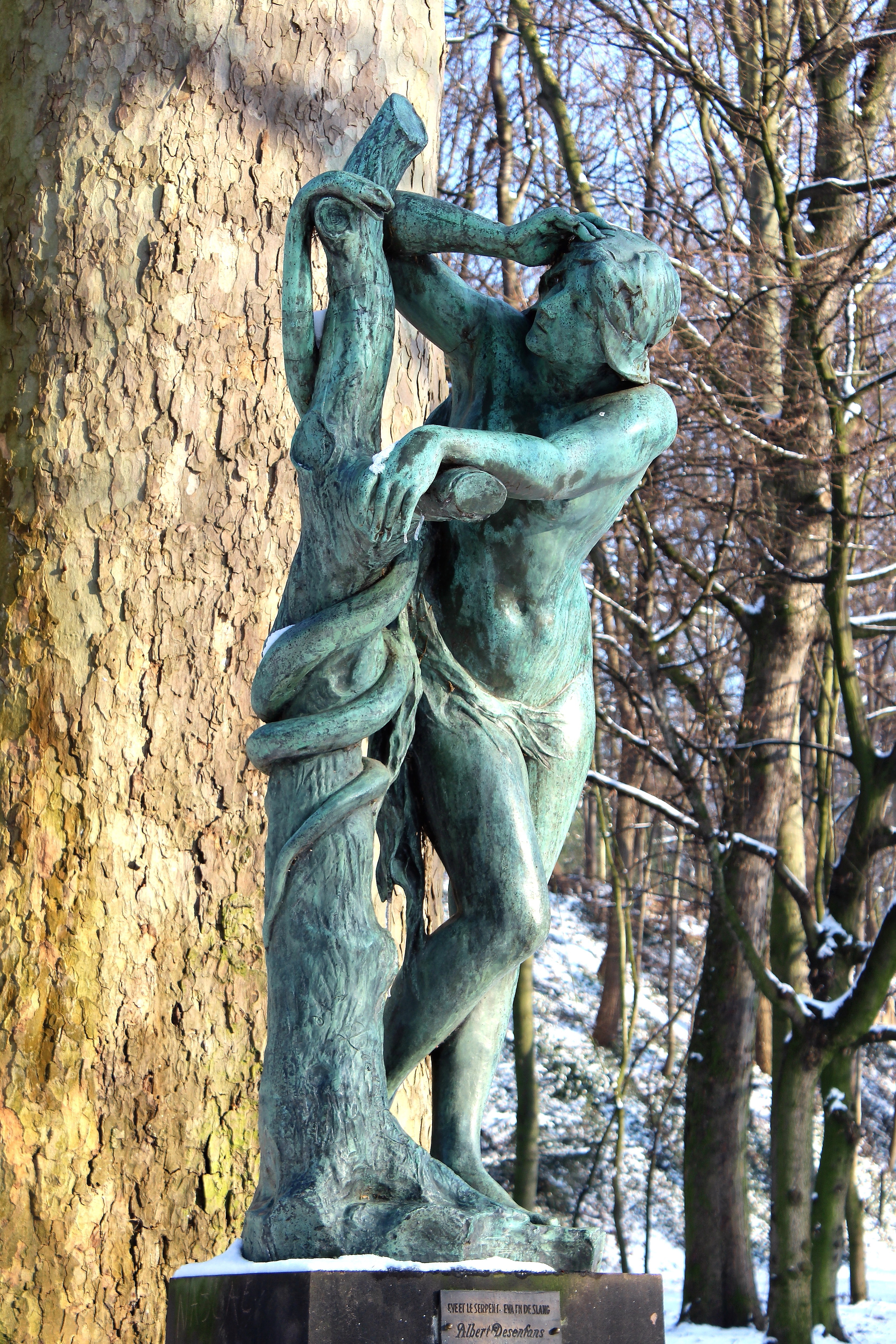
Eve and the Serpent by Desenfans (1890)

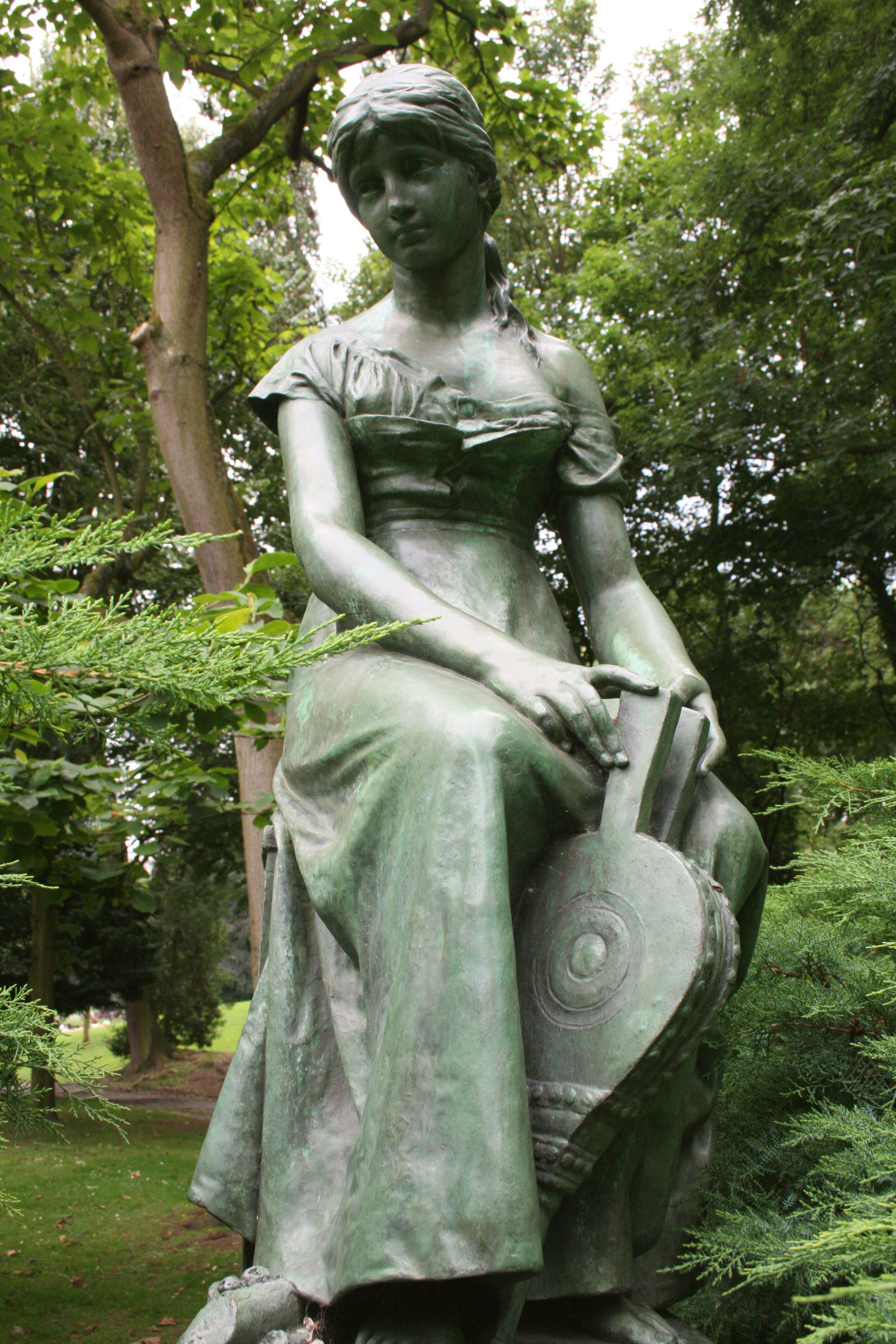
Cinderella by Edmond Lefever (1881)

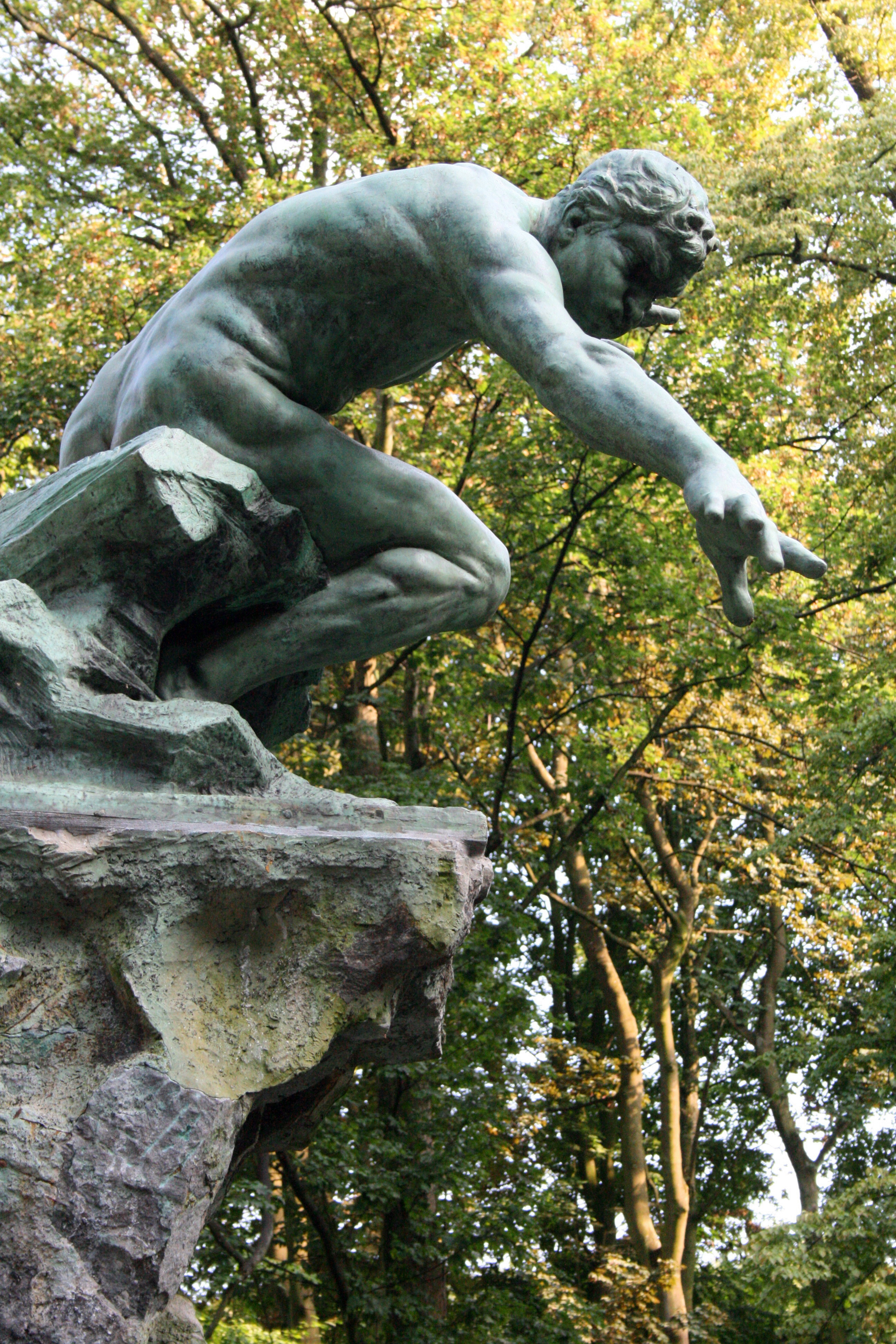
Boreas by Joseph Van Hamme (1904)

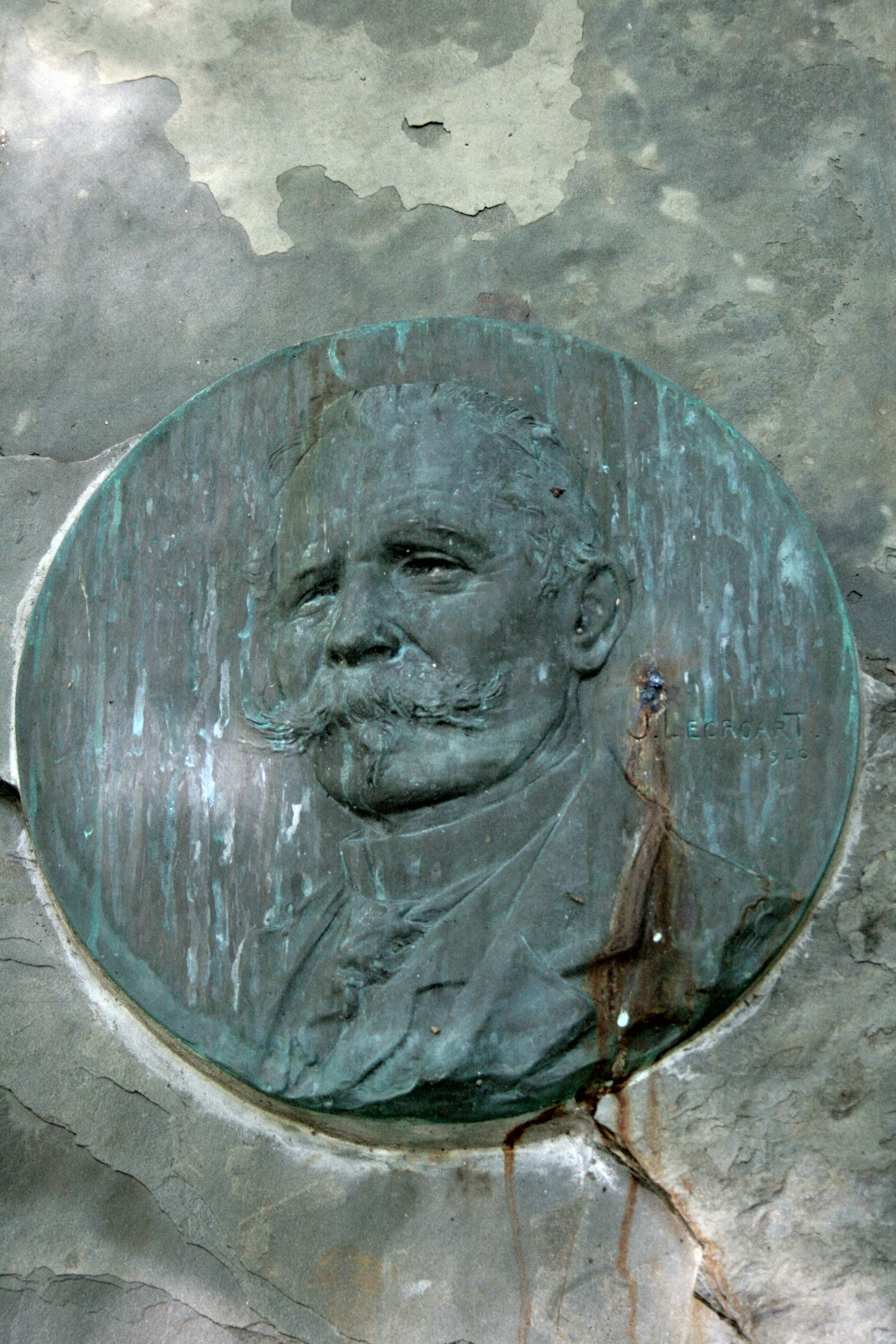
Bronze medallion with Edmond Galoppin's effigy by Jean Lecroart

== Legends of the Minnebron ==
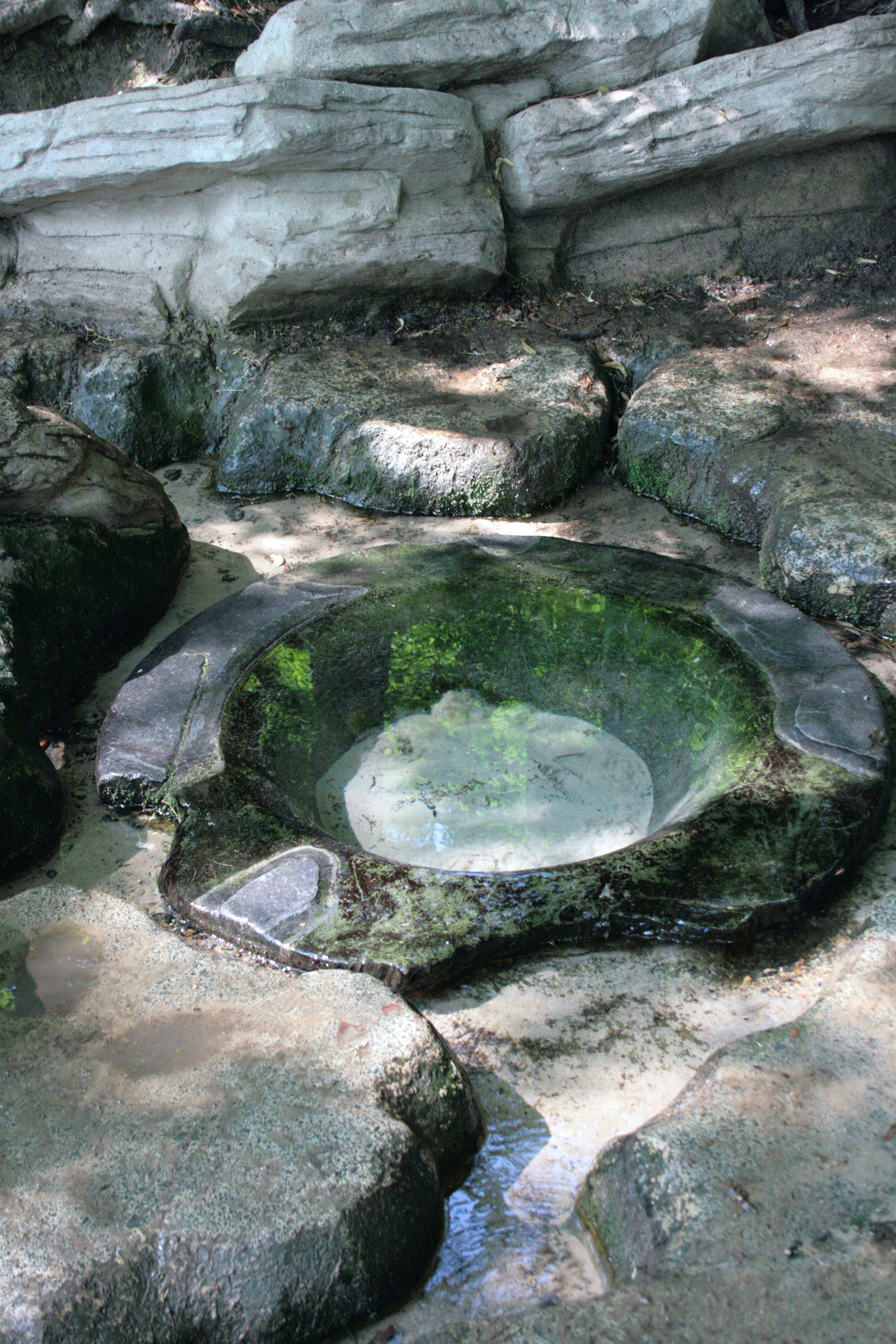
The Fontaine d'Amour or Minnebron

The Fontaine d'Amour or Minnebron, a spring in the Josaphat Valley, derives its name from several local legends. The most famous tells of a young peasant who, spurned by his fiancée, cried for days on end and ultimately went blind. He recovered his sight by wetting his eyes with water from the spring. The young girl then reappeared and pledged her fidelity to him once again. Another legend features a young noblewoman named Herlinde who resided in a castle on a nearby hill. One evening, she encountered and fell in love with a knight named Theobald. They secretly met every day at the spring. When Theobald was summoned to war, he vowed to return to Herlinde. Despite her hopes and nightly visits to the spring, Theobald never returned. Heartbroken, Herlinde eventually drowned herself in the spring. In a gesture of compassion, neighbours installed a reservoir-shaped memorial with an inscription that served as a poignant reminder of the event. In 1943, Fr De Roy bequeathed a sum of money for the construction of a monument associated with the legend, but it was not until 1986 that the sculptor De Rijk immortalised, in a block of Carrara marble, Herlinde throwing herself into the fountain. Even today, it is believed that if two lovers drink from the spring together, they will be united before the year's end.

== See also ==
- List of parks and gardens in Brussels
- History of Brussels
- Belgium in the long nineteenth century
