= Schaerbeek =

Municipality of the Brussels-Capital Region, Belgium

Schaerbeek: Schaerbeek (French); Schaarbeek (Dutch)
- Municipality
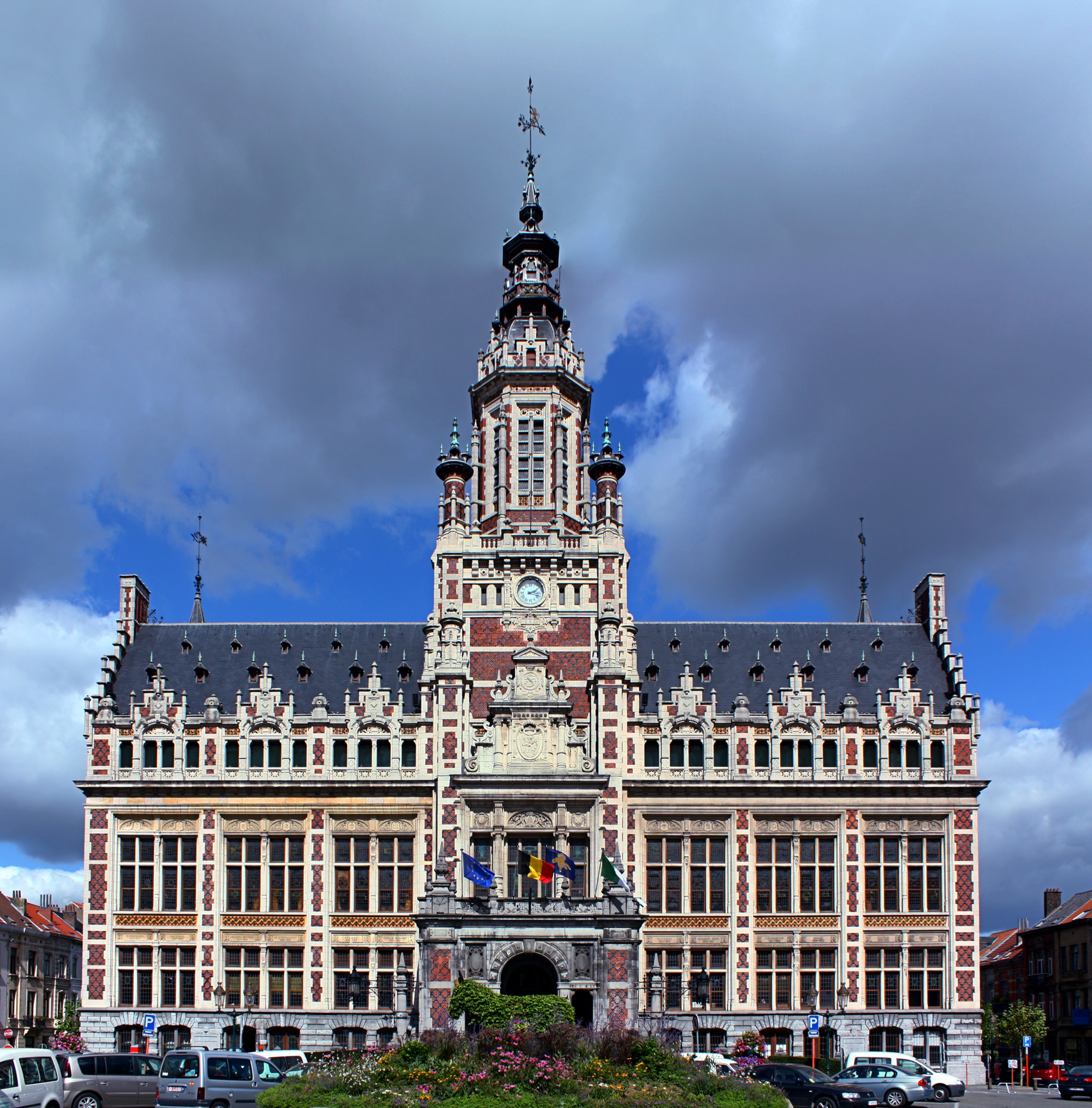
- Schaerbeek's Municipal Hall seen from the Place Colignon/Colignonplein

- Flag Coat of arms

- Schaerbeek municipality in the Brussels-Capital Region
- Interactive map of Schaerbeek
- Location in Belgium
- Coordinates: 50°52′03″N 04°22′25″E
- Country: Belgium
- Community: Flemish Community; French Community
- Region: Brussels-Capital
- Arrondissement: Brussels-Capital

Government
  - Mayor: Audrey Henry (MR)
  - Governing party: LB-Ecolo

Area
  - Total: 7.9 km^{2} (3.1 sq mi)

Population (2020-01-01)
  - Total: 132,799
  - Density: 17,000/km^{2} (44,000/sq mi)
- Postal codes: 1030
- NIS code: 21015
- Area codes: 02
- Website: 1030.be/fr (in French); 1030.be/nl (in Dutch)

Schaerbeek (French, pronounced [skaʁbek, -bɛk]; (Note: The name Schaerbeek comes from Dutch, so its French pronunciation does not (exactly) match the French orthography. See also Koekelberg.) former Dutch spelling) or Schaarbeek (modern Dutch, pronounced [ˈsxaːrbeːk]) is one of the 19 municipalities of the Brussels-Capital Region, Belgium. Located in the north-eastern part of the region, it is bordered by the City of Brussels, Etterbeek, Evere and Saint-Josse-ten-Noode. Like all municipalities in Brussels, it is officially bilingual (French–Dutch).

Schaerbeek has a multicultural identity stemming from its diverse population. As of 1 January 2022, the municipality had a population of 130,690 inhabitants. The total area is 7.9 km^{2} (3.1 sq mi), which gives a population density of 16,540/km^{2} (42,800/sq mi), twice the average of Brussels.

== Toponymy ==
The first mention of Schaerbeek's name was Scarenbecca, recorded in a document from the Bishop of Cambrai in 1120. The origin of the name may come from the Franconian (Old Dutch) words schaer ("notch", "score") and beek ("creek", "beck").

Schaerbeek is nicknamed "the city of donkeys" (French: la cité des ânes, Dutch: de ezelsgemeente). This name is reminiscent of times when people of Schaerbeek, who were cultivators of sour cherries primarily for Kriek production, would arrive at the Brussels marketplace with donkeys laden with sour cherries. Donkeys are still kept in Josaphat Park, and sour cherry trees line the streets of the Diamant Quarter of Schaerbeek (the Avenue Milcamps/Milcampslaan, the Avenue Émile Max/Émile Maxlaan, and the Avenue Opale/Opaallaan). The Square des Griottiers/Morelleboomsquare is named after these trees.

== History ==
=== Antiquity and Middle Ages ===
The period at which human activity started in Schaerbeek can be inferred from the Stone Age flint tools that were recovered in the Josaphat valley. Tombs and coins dating from the reign of Roman Emperor Hadrian (2nd century AD) were also found near the old Roman roads that crossed Schaerbeek's territory.

The first mention of the town's name appears in a legal document dated 1120, whereby the Bishop of Cambrai granted the administration of the churches of Scarenbecca and Everna (today's neighbouring Evere) to the canons of Soignies, located in modern-day Hainaut, Belgium. Politically, the town was part of the Duchy of Brabant. In 1301, John II, Duke of Brabant, had the town administered by the schepen (aldermen) of Brussels. A new church dedicated to Saint Servatius was built around that same time, at the same location as the old church.

At the end of the 14th century, the lands of Schaerbeek that belonged to the Lords of Kraainem were sold and reconverted into a hunting ground. The official entry of the visiting Dukes of Burgundy into Brussels, their second capital, was also through Schaerbeek, where they had to swear to uphold the city's privileges. The game reservation and the rural character of the village lasted until the end of the 18th century. The areas not covered by woods were used to cultivate vegetables and grow vines. In 1540, Schaerbeek counted 112 houses and 600 inhabitants.

=== 16th–19th centuries ===
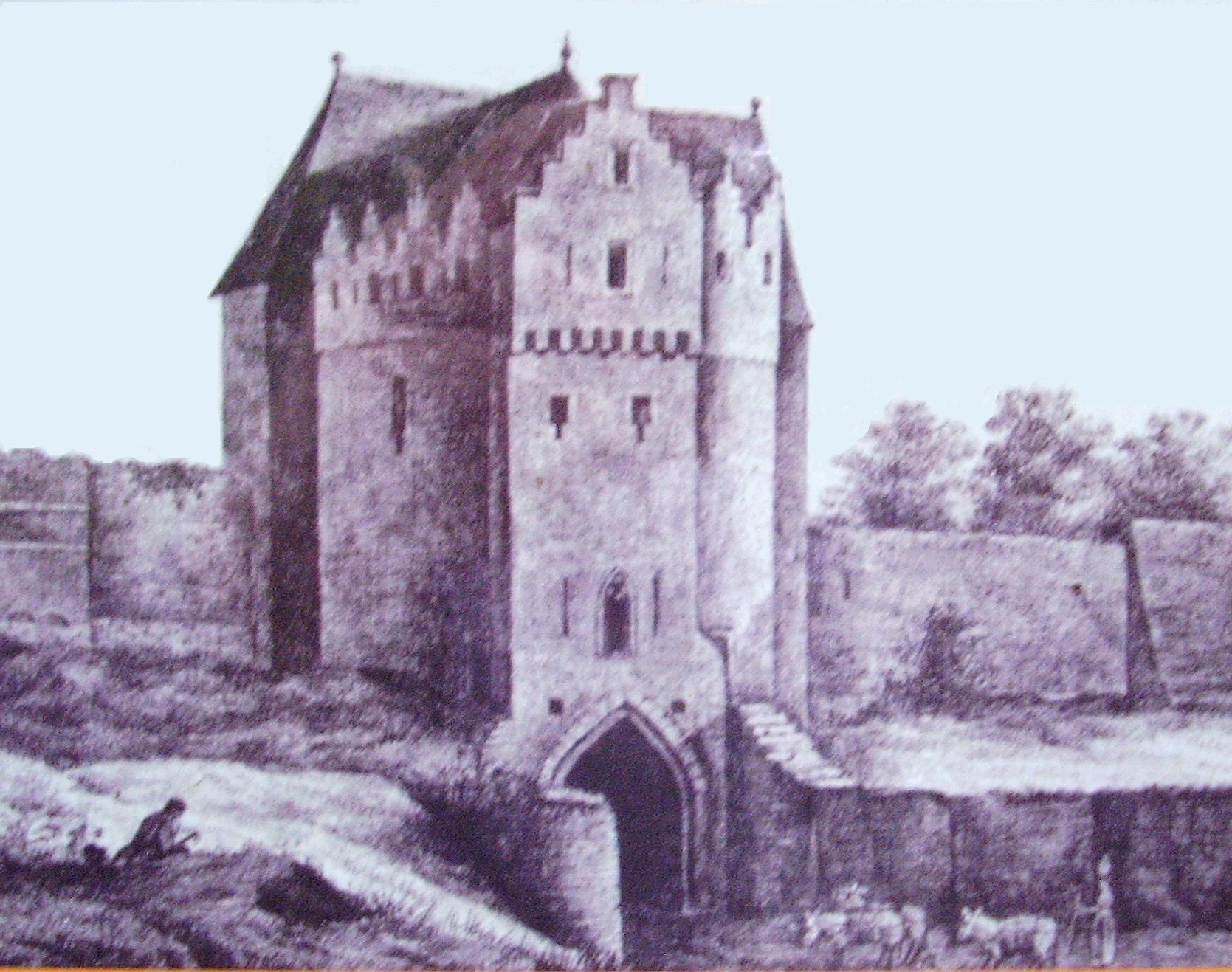
The Schaerbeek Gate in 1612

Until the 16th century, the village had lived in relative peace. This would change in the middle of the 16th century as the Reformation set in. Schaerbeek suffered through ravages and destruction about a dozen times over the following two centuries, starting in the 1570s with William the Silent's mercenary troops fighting the Catholic Duke of Alba. Spanish, French, British, and Bavarian troops all came through Schaerbeek, with the usual exactions and requisitions inflicted on the population.

After the French Revolution, it was decreed that Schaerbeek would be taken away from Brussels and proclaimed an independent municipality, with its own mayor, schepen, and municipal assembly. On 27 September 1830, during the Belgian Revolution, some fighting occurred in the Josaphat valley between the revolutionary troops and the retreating Dutch troops. In 1879, a more modern Church of St. Servatius was built near the old one, which was eventually demolished in 1905. The Municipal Hall and Schaerbeek railway station were built in 1887 and 1902, respectively. In 1889, the shooting range known as the Tir national was established.

At the end of the 19th and in the early 20th centuries, Schaerbeek became home to the gentry. The Avenue Louis Bertrand/Louis Bertrandlaan was laid out to herald a new, tree-filled residential district for the city's burgeoning middle classes, many of whom employed the period's best architects to design their new homes. Gustave Strauven, Franz Hemelsoet and Henri Jacobs were just three of the architects who reinvented family houses, apartment buildings and educational buildings in the Art Nouveau style.

=== 20th and 21st centuries ===
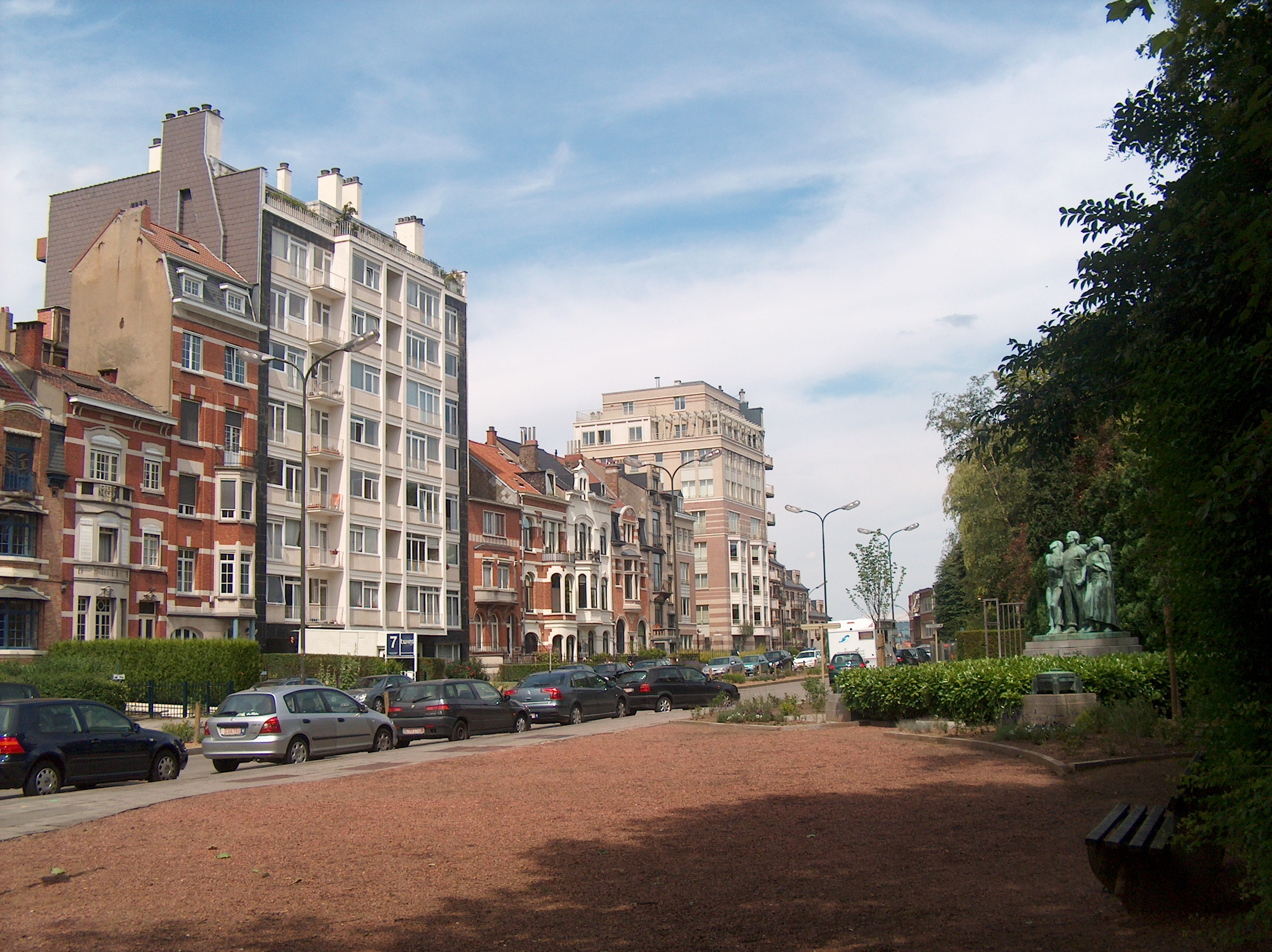
Place des Carabiniers/Karabiniersplein

At the turn of the 20th century, Schaerbeek was a booming suburb which attracted a large middle-class population. In 1904, the newly landscaped Josaphat Park was inaugurated. One year later, the old St. Servatius' Church, the last witness to Schaerbeek's medieval past, was demolished. In 1915, the British nurse Edith Cavell was executed by an occupying German Army firing squad at the Tir national. Dwight D. Eisenhower came to visit the municipality at the close of World War II. Five years later, the population of Schaerbeek peaked at 125,000 inhabitants.

==== 2016 terrorist attacks ====
On the morning of 22 March 2016, three coordinated bombings occurred in Belgium in which the Islamic State of Iraq and the Levant (ISIL) claimed responsibility. In these attacks, at least 31 victims and two suicide bombers were killed, and 300 other people were injured. Hours after the attacks, police were pointed to a home in Schaerbeek by the taxi driver who drove the suspects to Brussels Airport. They raided the home and found a nail bomb, 15 kg (33 lb) of acetone peroxide, hydrogen peroxide, and an ISIL flag. Inside a waste container near the house, they also found a computer belonging to Ibrahim El Bakraoui who is believed to have carried out suicide bombings during the attacks along with his brother.

Nearly seven months later, on 5 October, three police officers were attacked by a man with a camping knife in Schaerbeek. Two of them suffered stab wounds, while the third was physically assaulted but otherwise uninjured. The assailant was then shot in the leg, subdued, and taken to hospital for medical treatment. He was charged with attempted terrorism-related murder but the court did not see these charges proven. He was convicted to a nine-year prison sentence for assault and battery.

== Districts ==
There are two distinct parts of Schaerbeek; an eastern part and a western part. The eastern part (the area that includes the Square Vergote/Vergoteplein, the Boulevard Lambermont/Lambermontlaan, the Flowers Quarter, the Place de Jamblinne de Meux/De Jamblinne de Meuxplein, the Diamant Quarter and Josaphat Park) is an affluent area noted for its architecture and its convenient location (close to the EU institutions and the financial heart of the city, as well as NATO's headquarters).

The western part (the area near Brussels-North railway station, the Chaussée de Haecht/Haachtsesteenweg and the Van Praet bridge) is home to Brussels' large Belgian Turkish community. The area around St. Mary's Royal Church is dubbed the "Little Anatolia" (French: la petite Anatolie, Dutch: het Klein Anatolië) because of all the Turkish restaurants and shops on the Chaussée de Haecht. The area is also home to a significant Belgian Moroccan population and other immigrant communities such as Spanish, Congolese, and Asian immigrants. However, the district offers a social mix because of the numerous schools like the Hogeschool Sint-Lukas Brussel, the municipal administrations and the proximity of the Rue Royale/Koningsstraat.

== Main sights ==
Schaerbeek has a rich cultural and architectural heritage. Some of the main points of interest include:

- The Municipal Hall of Schaerbeek, designed in neo-Flemish Renaissance style by the architect Jules-Jacques Van Ysendyck, was inaugurated by King Leopold II in 1887.
- Josaphat Park, also inaugurated by King Leopold II (in 1904), provides a haven of quiet in the heart of the city. It is bordered by the Brusilia Residence, the tallest residential building in Belgium.
- Schaerbeek railway station, where the national railway museum of Belgium, Train World, opened in 2015.
- St. Mary's Royal Church, an eclectic Roman Catholic church built between 1845 and 1888, which has been listed as a protected monument since 1976.
- The Clockarium, a museum devoted to Art Deco ceramic clocks. There is also a beer museum and a mechanical organ museum nearby.
- Schaerbeek counts a number of Art Deco and Art Nouveau houses, including the Autrique House, the first house built by Victor Horta in the Brussels area.

Schaerbeek Cemetery, despite its name, is actually located in Evere.

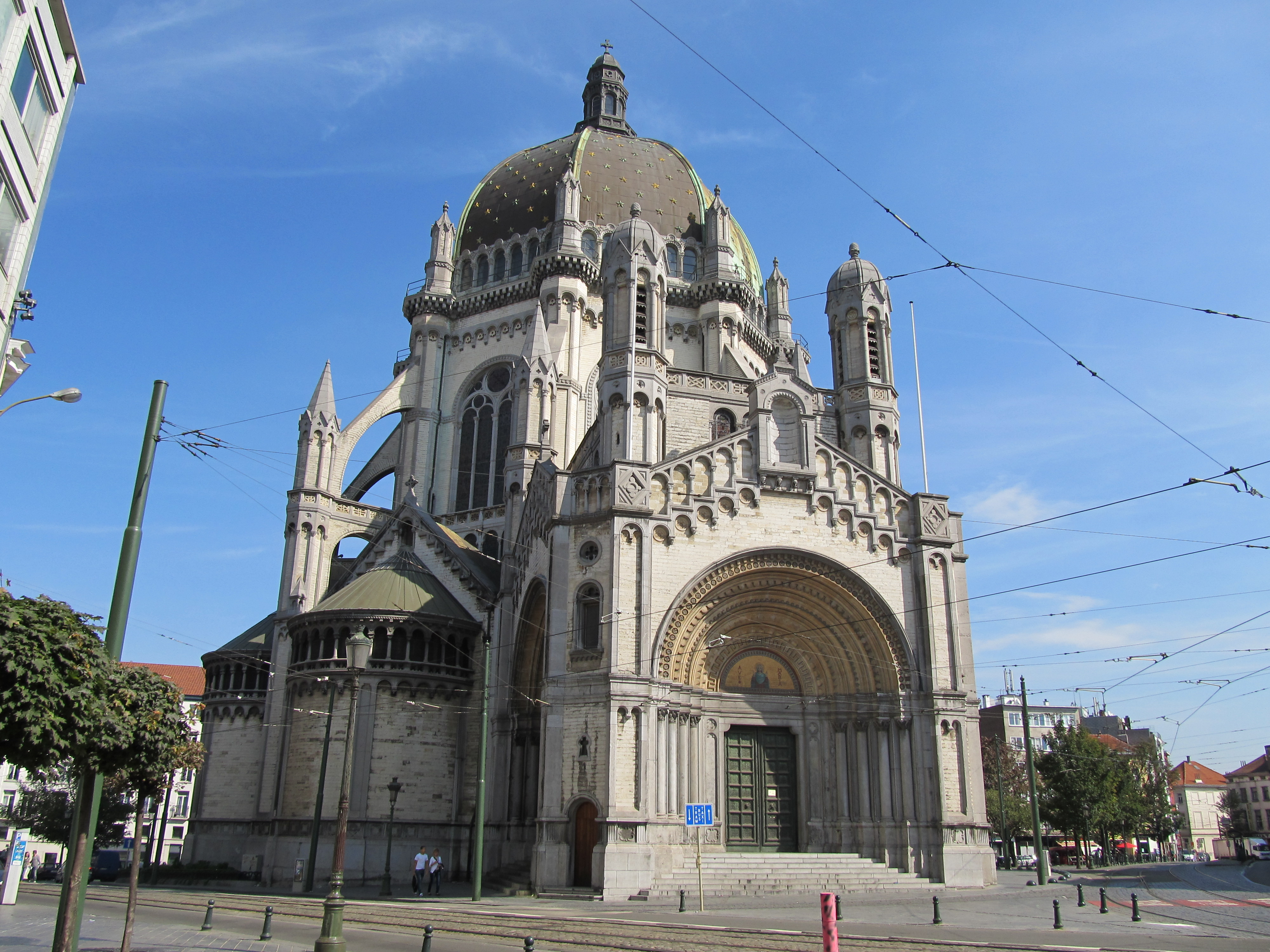
St. Mary's Royal Church

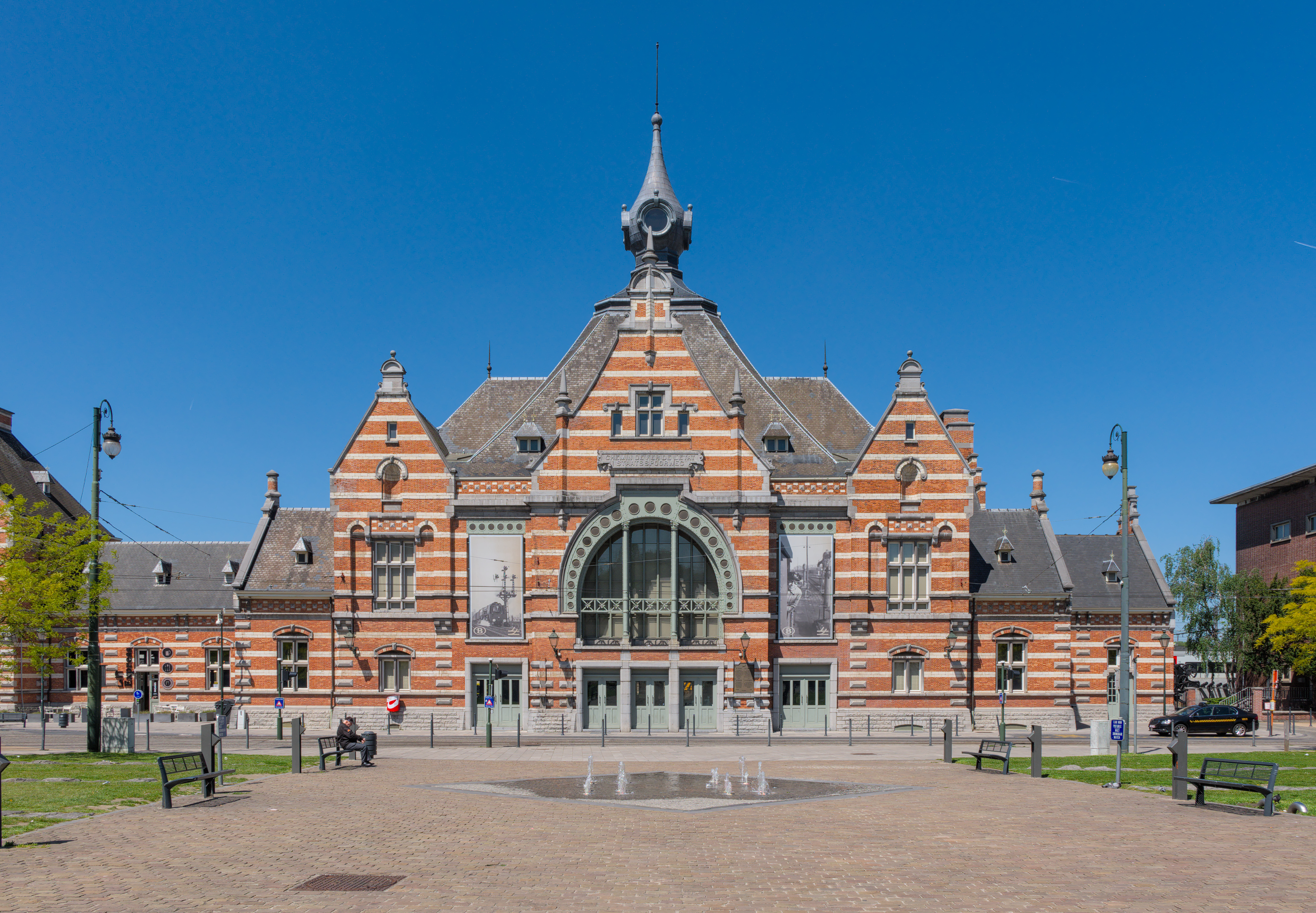
Schaerbeek railway station

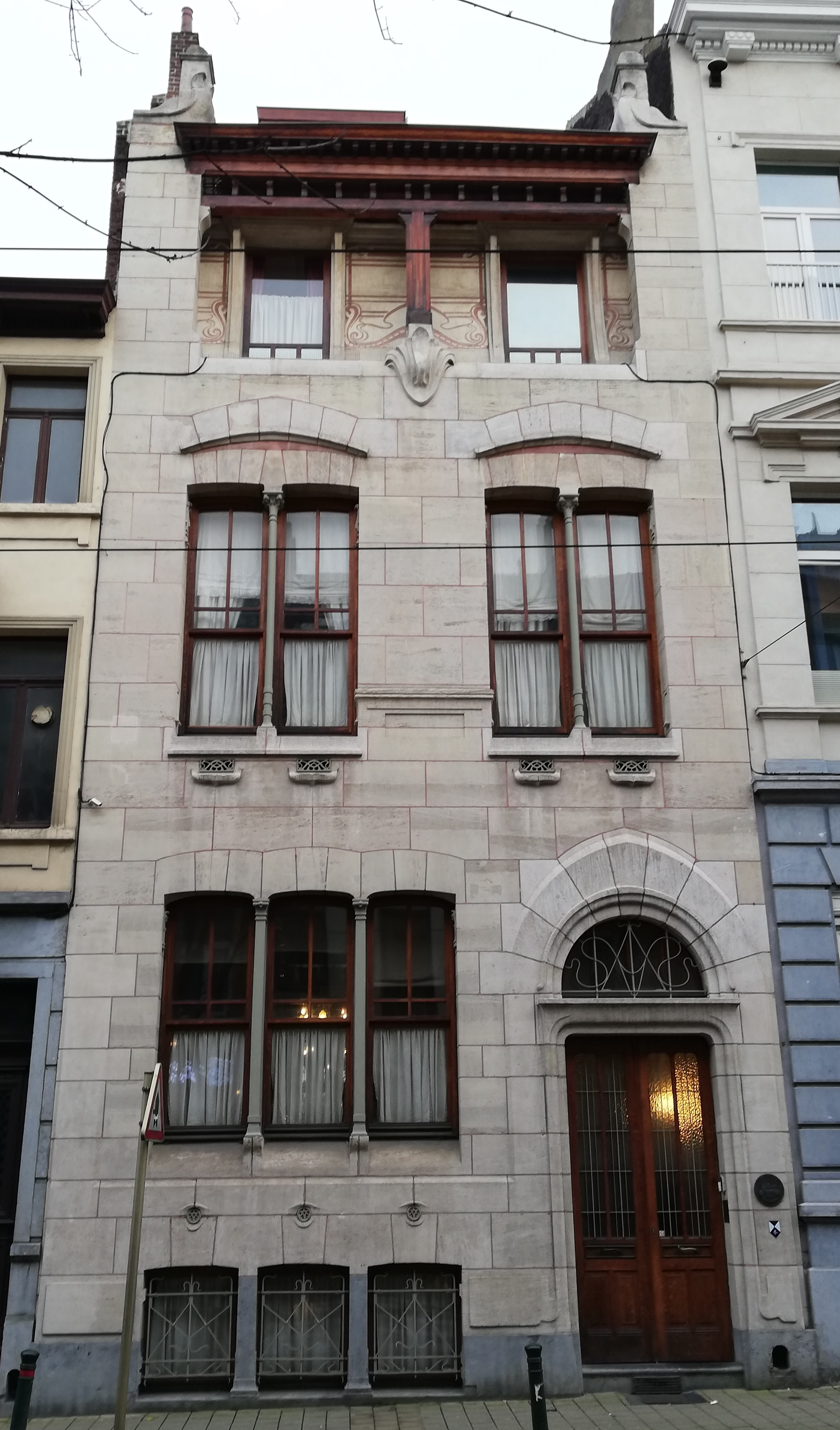
Autrique House

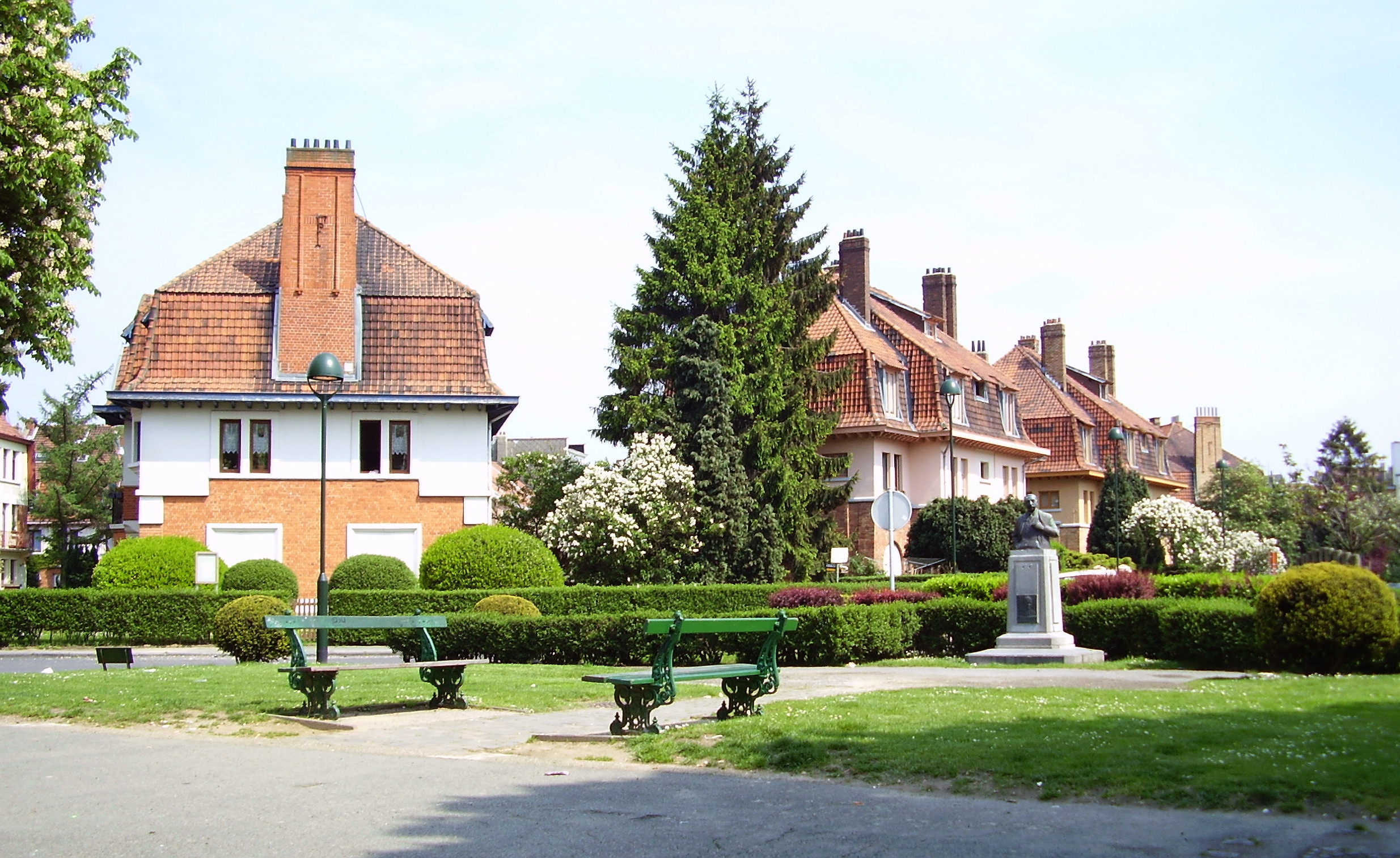
Terdelt garden city

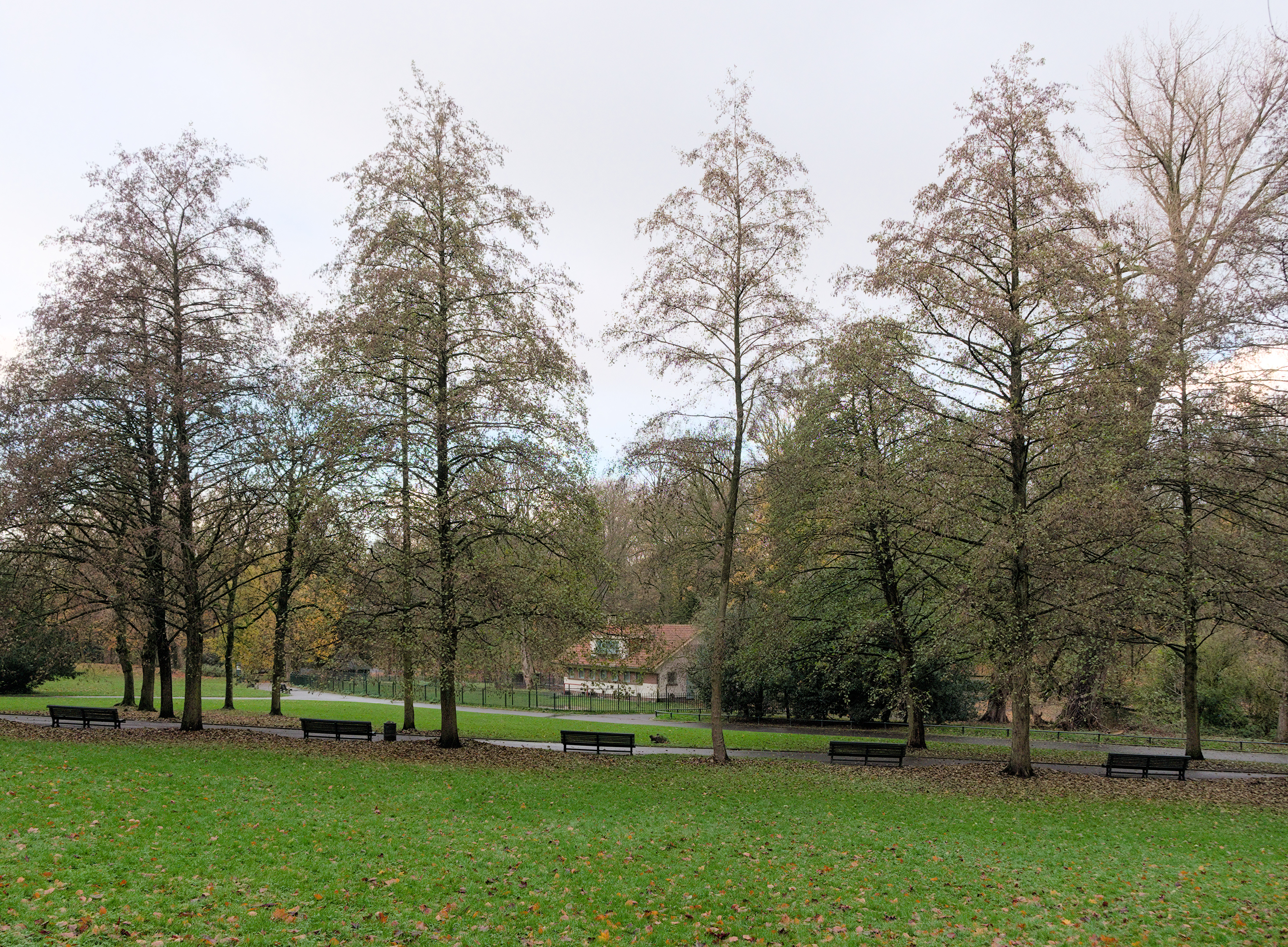
Josaphat Park

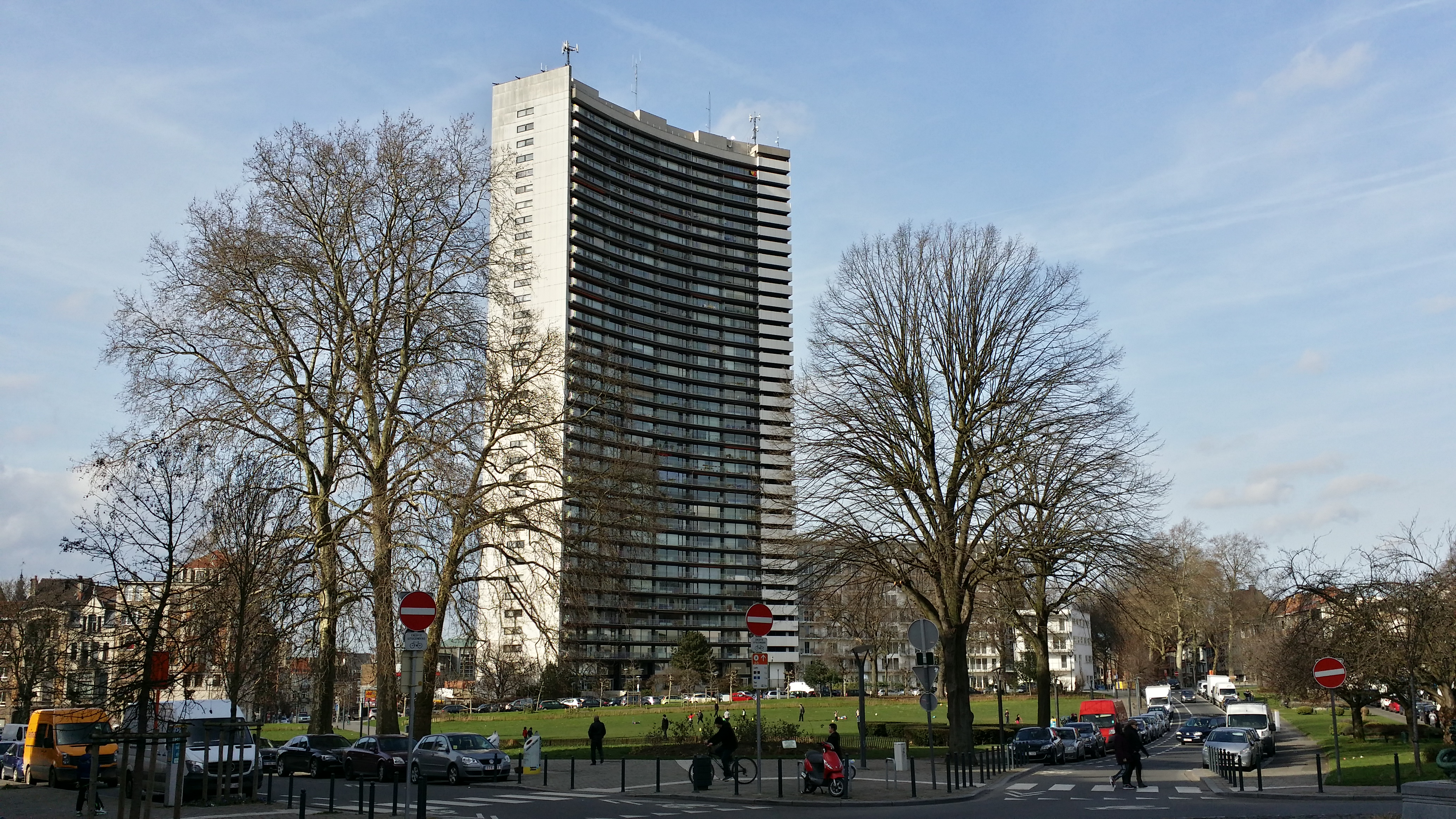
Brusilia Residence

== Demographics ==
=== Foreign population ===
Schaerbeek has a large concentration of immigrants from other countries, and their children, including many of Turkish ancestry, a significant part of which originates from Afyon or Emirdağ, Turkey.

Similar to Molenbeek, Schaerbeek has a large Muslim population. As of 2016, the largest share of Muslims in Schaerbeek is of Moroccan origin, but there are also significant communities of Turks and Albanians. That year, the mayor of Schaerbeek Bernard Clerfayt (DéFI) argued that the diversity in the foreign population means there is a lack of a ghetto effect, and Molenbeek's then-mayor Françoise Schepmans (MR) stated that the foreign population in Schaerbeek was more diverse than that of Molenbeek. 22% of young people in Schaerbeek are unemployed. The municipality lies in a semi-circle of neighbourhoods in Brussels often referred to as the "poor croissant". In 2022, Schaerbeek started offering official government services in English as well as the official Dutch or French options.

As of 2023, taking into account the nationality of birth of the parents, 52.78% of Schaerbeek's population is of non-European origin (predominantly Moroccan and Turkish), 21.13% of European origin other than Belgian (mainly Bulgarian, Romanian, French, Spanish, and Polish), while 18.46% is solely of native Belgian ancestry.

Migrant communities in Schaerbeek with over 1,000 people as of 1 January 2020:

Bulgaria	5,728
Romania	5,072
Morocco	4,463
France	4,275
Turkey	3,266
Spain	3,041
Poland	2,781
Italy	2,850
Syria	1,754
Portugal	1,435
Guinea	1,325

Group of origin	Year	
Group of origin	2023	
Group of origin	Number	%
Belgians with Belgian background	24,145	18.46%
Belgians with foreign background	56,626	43.3%
Neighbouring country	3,233	2.47%
EU27 (excluding neighbouring country)	5,244	4.01%
Outside EU 27	48,149	36.82%
Non-Belgians	50,004	38.24%
Neighbouring country	6,735	5.15%
EU27 (excluding neighbouring country)	22,393	17.12%
Outside EU 27	20,876	15.96%
Total	130,775	100%

== Politics ==
The current city council was elected in the October 2018 elections. The current mayor of Schaerbeek is Bernard Clerfayt, a member of DéFl, who is in coalition on the municipal council with Ecolo.

Schaerbeek local election – 14 October 2018
Party
Party	Votes	%	Swing (pp)	Elected 2018	Change
DéFI	16,887	31.97	▼0.77	17 / 47 (36%)	▼1
Ecolo - Groen	10,241	19.39	▲5.96	10 / 47 (21%)	▲3
PS - sp.a	9,557	18.09	▼6.98	9 / 47 (19%)	▼4
PVDA-PTB	6,688	12.66	▲9.31	6 / 47 (13%)	▲5
cdH - CD&V	3,814	7.22	▼1.83	5 / 47 (11%)	▼1
MR - Open Vld	3,291	6.23	▼3.34	3 / 47 (6%)	▼2
N-VA	1,444	2.73	▲0.49	0 / 47 (0%)	-
Vlaams Belang	620	1.17	▲0.28	0 / 47 (0%)	-
Citoyens d'Europe M3E	285	0.54	new	0 / 47 (0%)	-

=== 2003 election incident ===
During the Belgian federal election of 18 May 2003, a candidate received 4,096 unexplained extra votes. After an inquiry, the anomaly was attributed to a single-event upset in an electronic voting machine, likely to have been caused by an ionising particle.

== Education ==
Public communal French-language secondary schools include:

- Athénée Fernand Blum, a traditional gateway to the Université libre de Bruxelles (ULB)
- Institut communal d'enseignement technique Frans Fischer
- Lycée Emile Max

French-language subsidised religious secondary schools include:

- Centre scolaire Sainte-Marie La Sagesse
- Collège Roi Baudouin
- Institut de la Saint-Famille d'Helmet
- Collège Roi Baudouin Enseignement technique et professionnel
- Institut Technique Cardinal Mercié-Notre-Dame du Sacré-Coeur
- Institut Saint-Dominique
- Institut de la Vierge Fidèle

Koninklijk Atheneum Emmanuel Hiel serves as the public Dutch-language secondary school in Schaerbeek, operated by the Flemish Community.

== Notable inhabitants ==
- Todor Angelov (1900–1943), Bulgarian member of the Resistance during World War II
- Jacques Brel (1929–1978), singer-songwriter and actor
- Roger Camille, also known as Kiko (1936–2006), cartoonist
- Nicolas Colsaerts (born 1982), European Tour professional golfer
- Claude Coppens (born 1936), pianist and composer
- Monique de Bissy (1923–2009), French-Belgian member of the Resistance during World War II
- Michel de Ghelderode (1898–1962), avant-garde dramatist, employed at the Municipal Hall from 1923 to 1946
- Andrée de Jongh (1916–2007), member of the Resistance during World War II, leader of the Comet Line
- Paul Deschanel (1855–1922), French statesman and President of France
- Daniel Ducarme (1954–2010), politician and Minister-President of the Brussels-Capital Region
- Georges Eekhoud (1854–1927), novelist
- Virginie Efira (born 1977), actress and television presenter
- Jan Ferguut (1835–1902), writer and poet
- Emilio Ferrera (born 1967), football player and coach
- Agustín Goovaerts (1885–1939), architect
- Georges Grun (born 1962), football player
- Franz Hemelsoet (1875–1947), Art Nouveau architect
- Jan Cornelis Hofman (1889–1966), Dutch post-impressionist painter, died there.
- Alain Hutchinson (born 1949), politician and MEP
- Henri Jacobs (1864–1935), Art Nouveau architect
- Camille Jenatzy (1868–1913), racing driver
- Henry Le Bœuf (1874–1935), banker and patron of the arts
- René Magritte (1898–1967), surrealist painter
- Maurane (1960–2018), singer and actress
- Anca Parghel (1957–2008), Romanian jazz singer, lived on the Avenue Paul Deschanel/Paul Deschanellaan.
- Rob Redding (born 1976), American media proprietor and abstract artist
- Jean Roba (1930–2006), comic book author, creator of Boule et Bill
- François Schuiten (born 1956), comic book artist
- Roger Somville (1923–2014), painter
- Paul-Henri Spaak (1899–1972), politician, statesman, Prime Minister, Secretary General of NATO, and one of the Founding fathers of the European Union
- Gustave Strauven (1878–1919), Art Nouveau architect
- Raymond van het Groenewoud (born 1950), musician and singer

== International relations ==
=== Twin towns and sister cities ===
Schaerbeek is twinned with:

- Houffalize, Belgium
- Al-Hoceima, Morocco
- Nablus, Palestine
- Beyoğlu, Turkey
- Prairie Village, Kansas, United States
- Dardania, Pristina, Kosovo
- Quebec City, Canada
- Vicovu de Sus, Romania
- Anyang, China
