= Académie royale de langue et de littérature françaises de Belgique =

- Formation: 1920
- Headquarters: Brussels, Belgium
- Members: Elected
- Website: www.arllfb.be

The Académie royale de langue et de littérature françaises de Belgique (French pronunciation: [akademi ʁwajal də lɑ̃ɡ e d(ə) liteʁatyʁ fʁɑ̃sɛːz də bɛlʒik]; 'Royal Academy of French Language and Literature of Belgium') or ARLLFB is a Belgian institution which brings together personalities who, through their works, writings, lectures or speeches, have contributed most eminently to the illustration of the French language, either by studying its origins and its evolution, or by publishing works of imagination or criticism. It includes both Belgian and foreign members.

The Royal Academy of French Language and Literature of Belgium, also named the "Destréenne", was founded in 1920 by King Albert I of Belgium, at the suggestion of Jules Destrée, minister in charge of Science and Arts. It should not be confused with the Royal Academy of Belgium, the "Teresian", founded in 1772 by Empress Maria Theresa of Austria.

== Founding principles ==
There are three founding principles:

- It will bring together imaginative writers, novelists, playwrights, poets and philologists, in a broad sense, specialists of ancient texts, grammarians, linguists and historians of literature. Principle justified in the following terms: "The total meaning of a language is revealed only in terms of its constant transformation."
- The second: the academy should elect foreign members not only from France, but also from Canada, French-speaking Switzerland, Italy, Romania, Czechoslovakia, from all countries where the French language is "spoken, honored, cultivated, and which are like the intellectual provinces of French civilization".
- Third: the academy should include female members: "women of letters gave too many unquestionable proofs of talent to think of removing them from a literary society".

== History and composition ==
The initial nucleus of the academy named ten writers: Henri Carton de Wiart, Georges Eekhoud, Iwan Gilkin, Albert Giraud, Hubert Krains, Maurice Maeterlinck, Albert Mockel, fr:Fernand Séverin, Paul Spaak, fr:Gustave Vanzype. And for the philological section, its first four members were representatives of the Liège school of philology: fr:Maurice Wilmotte, fr:Auguste Doutrepont, Jules Feller and Jean Haust.

The autonomy of the academy is assured by the recommendation that the elections take place by co-optation. Its composition is defined as follows: thirty members of Belgian origin, including twenty literary writers and ten philologists; Ten foreign members, including six writers and four philologists for a total of forty members.

In the year following creation, the newly invited members included Anna de Noailles, Gabriele D'Annunzio, Swiss novelist fr:Benjamin Vallotton and the French grammarian Ferdinand Brunot.

From its foundation to the present day, the academy has counted one hundred and twenty-four Belgian members, of whom eleven were women, and forty-nine foreign members from either France, Switzerland, Italy, the United States, Romania, Quebec, Great Britain, China, Denmark, Spain, Finland, Israel, The Netherlands, Peru or Sweden.

== Prizes ==
The Royal Academy of French Language and Literature of Belgium also awards literary prizes.
