= Hubert Krains =

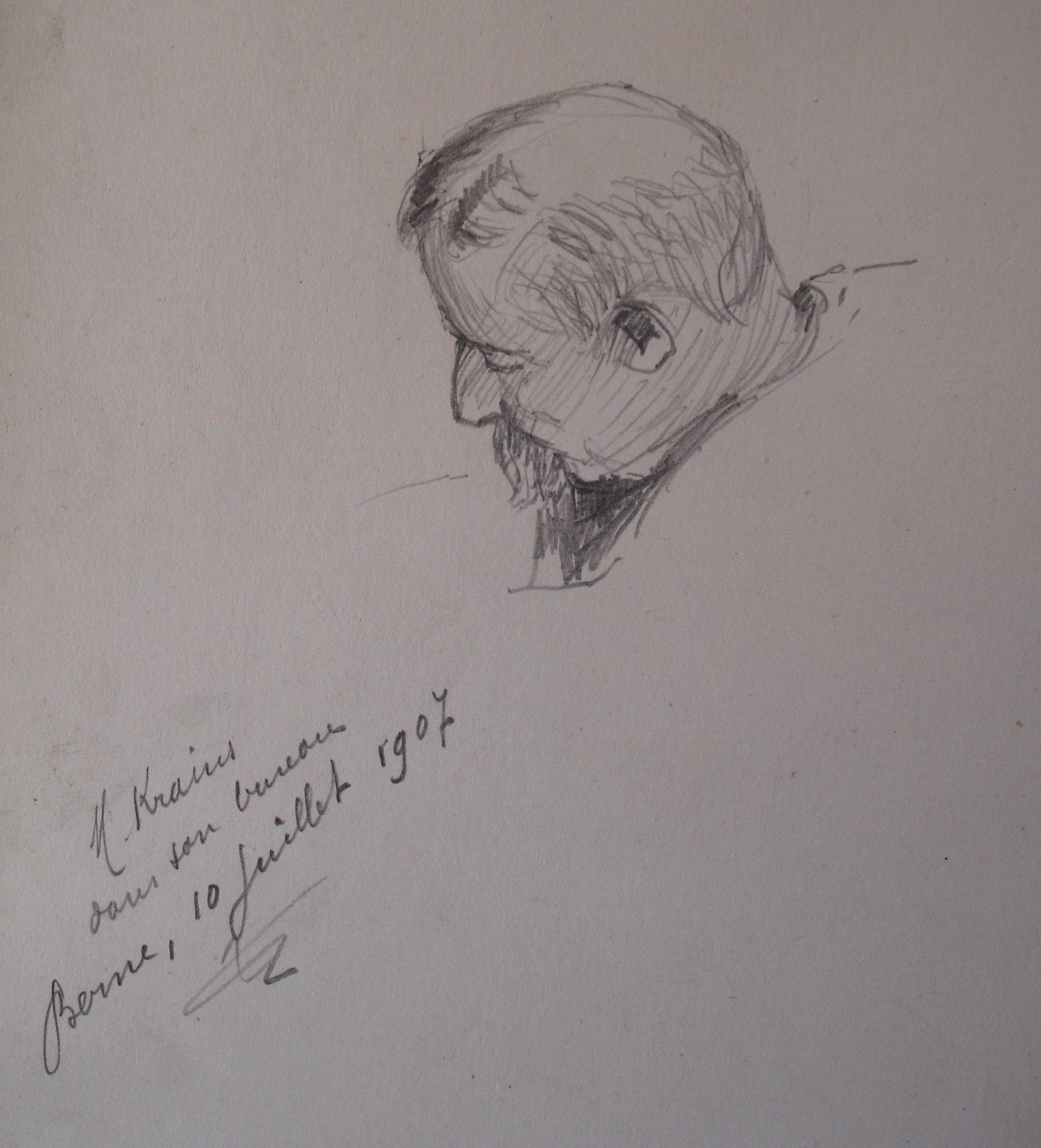

Hubert Krains (1862–1934) was a Belgian author who wrote two novels, five short-story collections and a collection of essays. His fiction focuses on peasant life, employs a simple and direct style, and is predominantly tragic in tone.

== Life ==
Born in Brussels, Krains became a member of the Académie royale de langue et de littérature françaises de Belgique. He wrote essays and became famous with Portraits d'écrivains belges (1930), a collection of essays on Belgian writers. Krains died in a train accident. A prize is named in his honour.

== Works ==
- "Le pain noir" – short story anthologized in À la gloire de la Belgique, edited by Jan Greshoff (1915), pp. 237–241. (Available on dbnl.org)

== Honours ==
- 1924: Commander in the Order of the Crown.
