= Maelbeek =

- Maalbeek, stream
- Maelbeek/Maalbeek metro station, a subway station
