= Edelheere Altarpiece (Descent from the cross) =

Copy of a painting Rogier van der Weyden

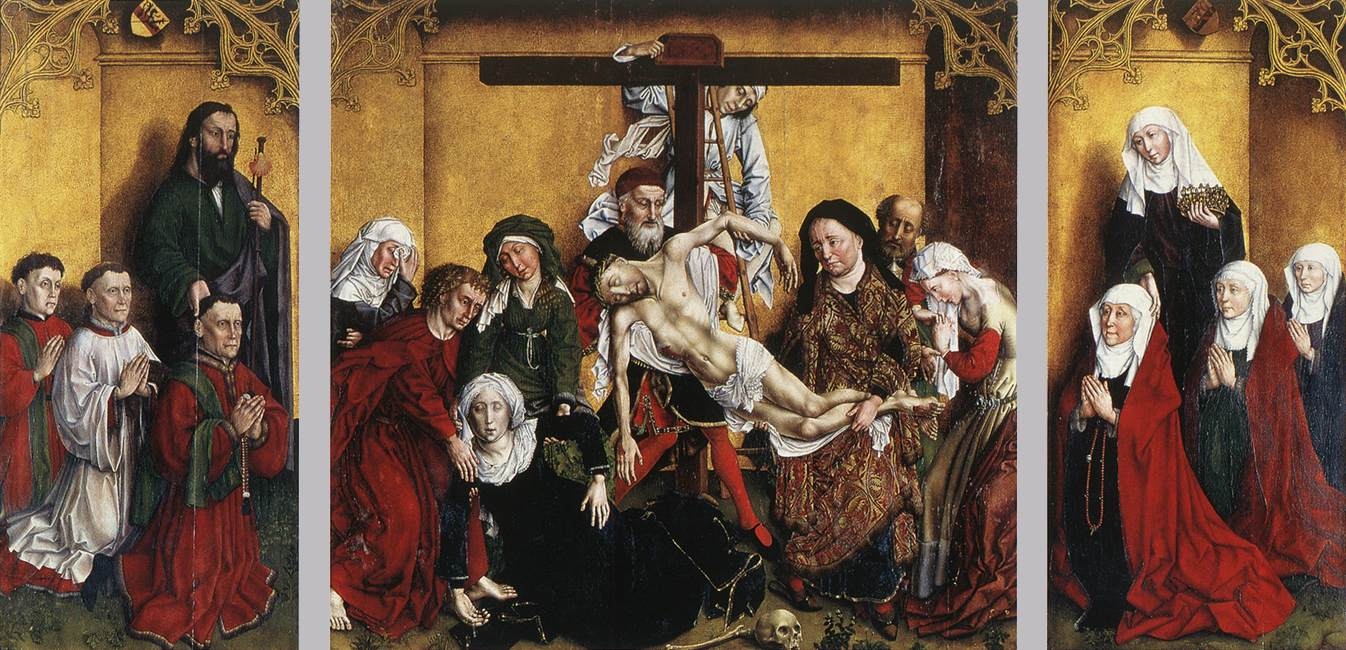
Edelheere Altarpiece, unknown artist after Rogier van der Weyden

The Edelheere Altarpiece is the first of many copies of the Descent from the Cross painted by Rogier van der Weyden around 1435. A total of fifty copies of Van de Weyden's work are known. The Edelheere triptych was made in 1443 for the St. Peter's Church in Leuven by an unknown artist, and it was commissioned by Willem Edelheere from Leuven.

== Journey of the Triptych ==
That the altarpiece was not always appreciated shows: it was moved in the course of the eighteenth century to the dressing room of the canons, where it served as a coat rack. Radiographic recordings show holes that were made by clothing hooks. In 1801 the panels were moved to the attic of the St. Peter's Church, until they were offered for sale at a flea market in 1825 together with a lot of wooden planks. This was discovered by the director of the Leuven Academy of Fine Arts, and the panels were placed back in the church. Once back in the church the panels were restorated. With the arrival of the Second World War, the triptych was kept in the vaults of the National Bank in Brussels. Today the art piece can be seen again in the St. Peter's Church.

== Picture ==
The triptych was placed as a sort of memorial table on the family altar in St. Peter's Church. On the left side panel, Willem Edelheere (who died in 1439) and his sons, Willem and Jacob are kneeling down. Saint James the Greater stands next to them. Mirrored on the right-hand side panel are his wife Aleydis Cappuyns and their daughters, Aleydis and Catharina, standing next to Saint Aleydis. In addition, the coats of the arms of both spouses are depicted centrally on the respective panels.

The Trinity, although badly damaged, is depicted on the left outer hatch. God the Father holds the dead body of his son before him; Christ shows the wound in his side with his right hand. A dove is visible between God the Father and Christ, representing the Holy Spirit. The outer right-hand side represents Saint John the Evangelist, who supports Mary who is swooned.

The fainting Madonna, the Holy Spirit and Saint James refer to the altar of the Edelheere's Chapel, since it is also dedicated to the three of them.
