= Boniface of Brussels =

Bishop of Lausanne and saint

Saint Boniface
- Bishop of Lausanne
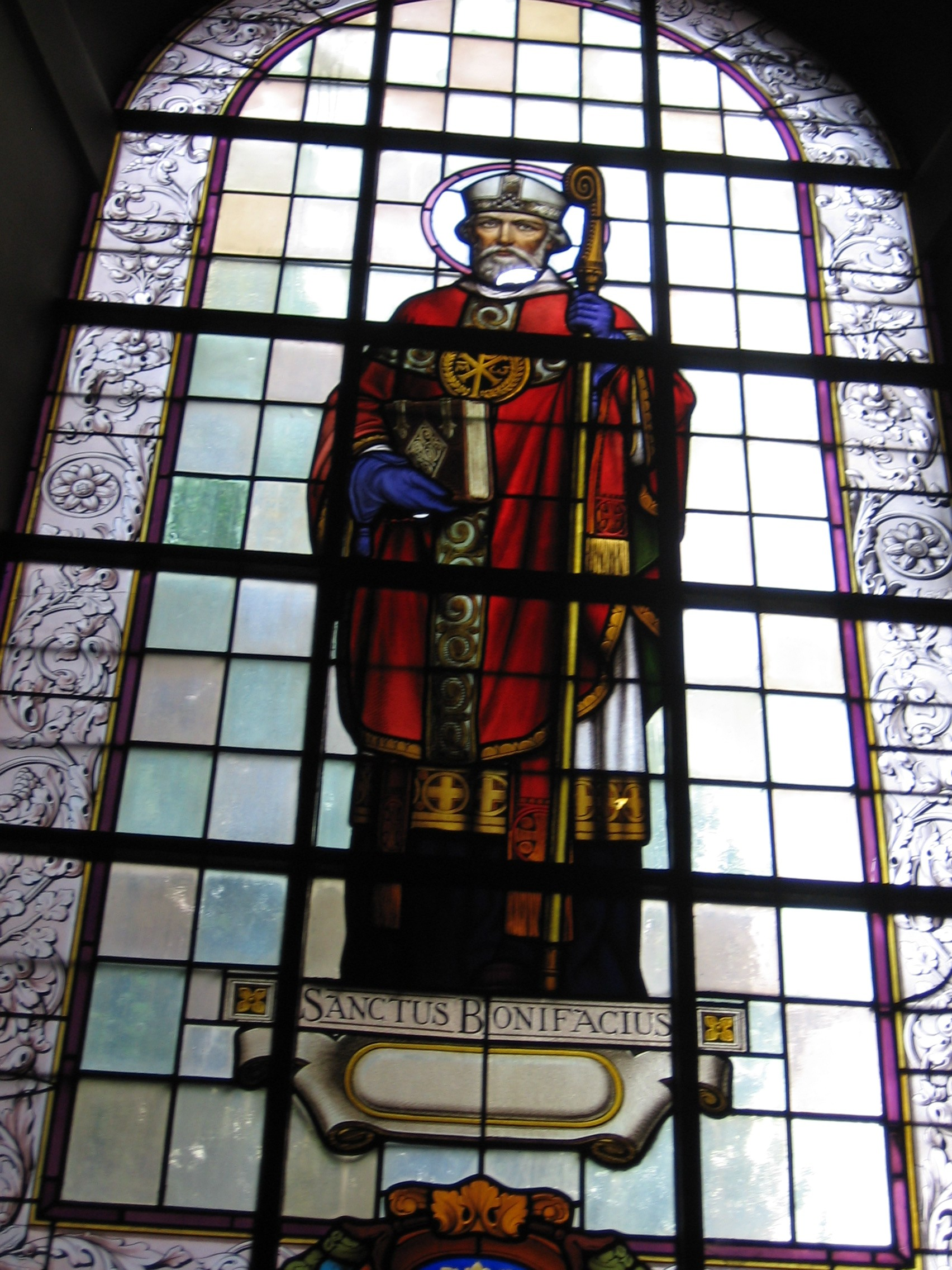
- Stained-glass window in St. Peter's Church, Brussels
- Church: Catholic Church
- Diocese: Lausanne
- See: Lausanne
- Appointed: 1231
- Installed: March 1231
- Term ended: 1239
- Predecessor: Guillaume di Cenblens
- Successor: Jean di Cossonay

Orders
- Consecration: c. 1231
- Rank: Bishop

Personal details
- Born: Boniface; 1183 Brussels, Belgium
- Died: 19 February 1265 La Cambre

Sainthood
- Feast day: 19 February
- Venerated in: Catholic Church
- Beatified: 1603 by Pope Clement VIII
- Canonized: 1702; Saint Peter's Basilica, Papal States by Pope Clement XI
- Attributes: Episcopal attire

Boniface of Brussels (1183 – 19 February 1260) was a Catholic prelate who served as the Bishop of Lausanne from circa 1231 until 1239 when he resigned after agents of Holy Roman Emperor Frederick II assaulted him. His relics are housed at the Kapellekerk, and at La Cambre where he died.

== Biography ==
Boniface was born in what is today Belgium in 1183. A Cistercian monk of the Abbey of Cambre, near Brussels, he left in 1200 left to study at University of Paris.

Distinguished for his learning, he taught dogma and became a popular lecturer. He was ordained to the priesthood while in France and from 1222 until 1229 taught at the college. But there soon became a bitter dispute between the teachers and students which prompted him to leave and find work elsewhere. He then taught, until 1231, in Cologne at the cathedral school.

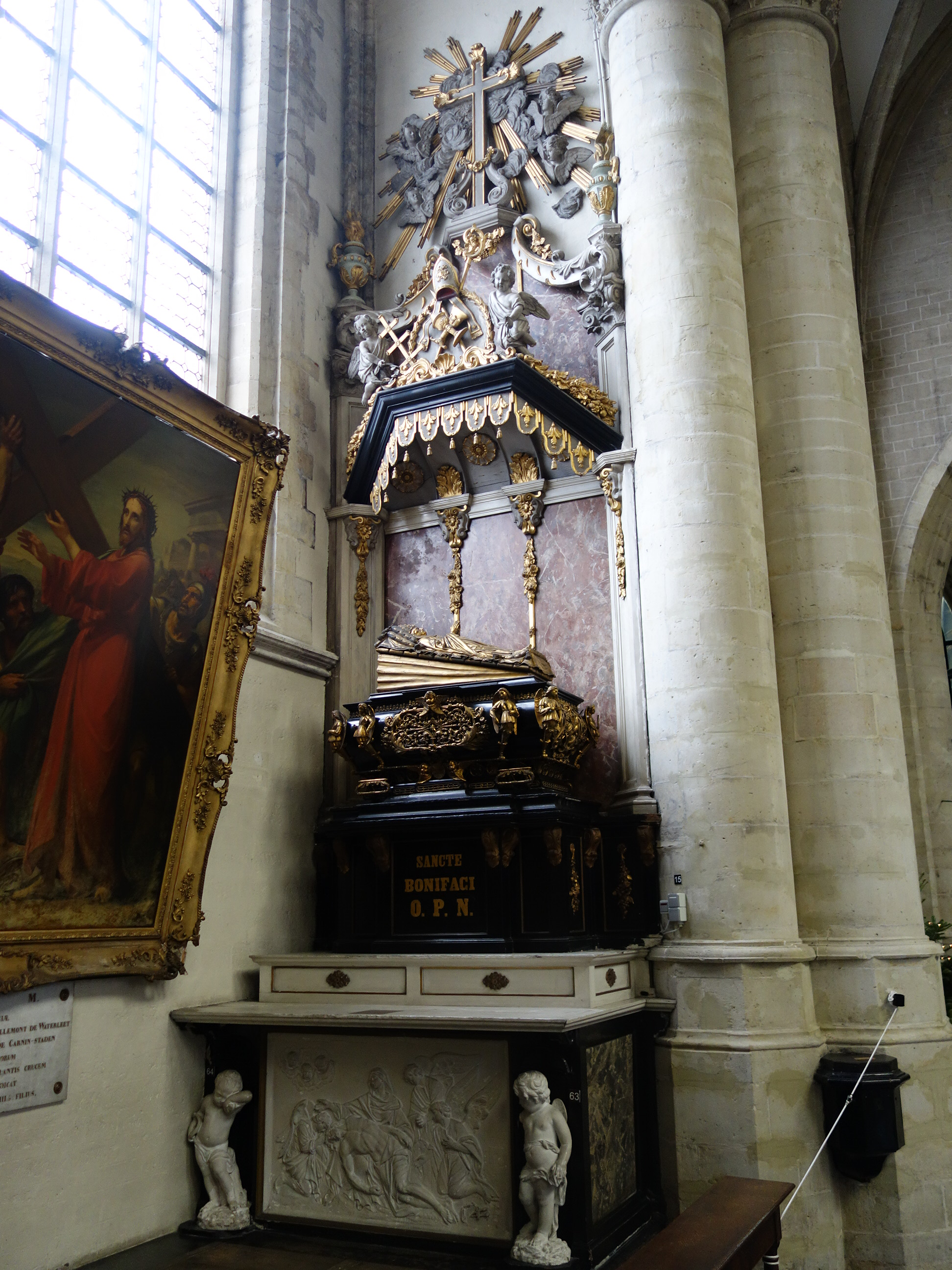
Tomb inside the Chapel Church, Brussels

He became the Bishop of Lausanne in 1231 and was enthroned in his new see in March 1231 after receiving his episcopal consecration. He was enthusiastic about this appointment but was faced with corrupt priests which he condemned in a pulpit address while also singling out King Frederick II. The king sent his agents to attack Boniface who sustained serious injuries but managed to escape. In 1239, he travelled to Rome and secured permission from a reluctant Pope Gregory IX to resign. He later served as an auxiliary bishop in Brabant.

In 1245 he attended the First Council of Lyon which Pope Innocent IV had convoked, and later retired to La Cambre Abbey. Boniface died in 1265.

== See also ==
- List of Catholic saints

== Sources ==
- Bollandus, Joannes; Henschenius, Godefridus (edd). Acta sanctorum ... Februarius. (in Latin). Volume 3 Antwerp: apud Jacobum Meursium, 1658. pp. 149–159.
- Eubel, Conradus, ed. (1913). Hierarchia catholica (in Latin). Vol. 1 (Tomus I) (second ed.). Münster: Libreria Regensbergiana. p. 296 with note 1.
- Rattinger, D. "Der hl. Bonifaz, Universitätsprofessor zu Paris, Domscholaster zu Köln, Bischof von Lausanne, Weihbischof in Brabant und den Niederlanden," in: Stimmen aus Maria-Laach, (in German), vol. 50 (Fribourg, 1896), 10-23, 139-157.
- Schmitt, Martin (1858). Mémoires historiques sur le Diocèse de Lausanne, (in French), Fribourg: Impr. J.-L. Piller 1858), Volume 2, pp. 1–15.
