= La Cambre Abbey =

Former abbey in Brussels, Belgium

- Abbaye de La Cambre (French); Abdij Ter Kameren (Dutch)
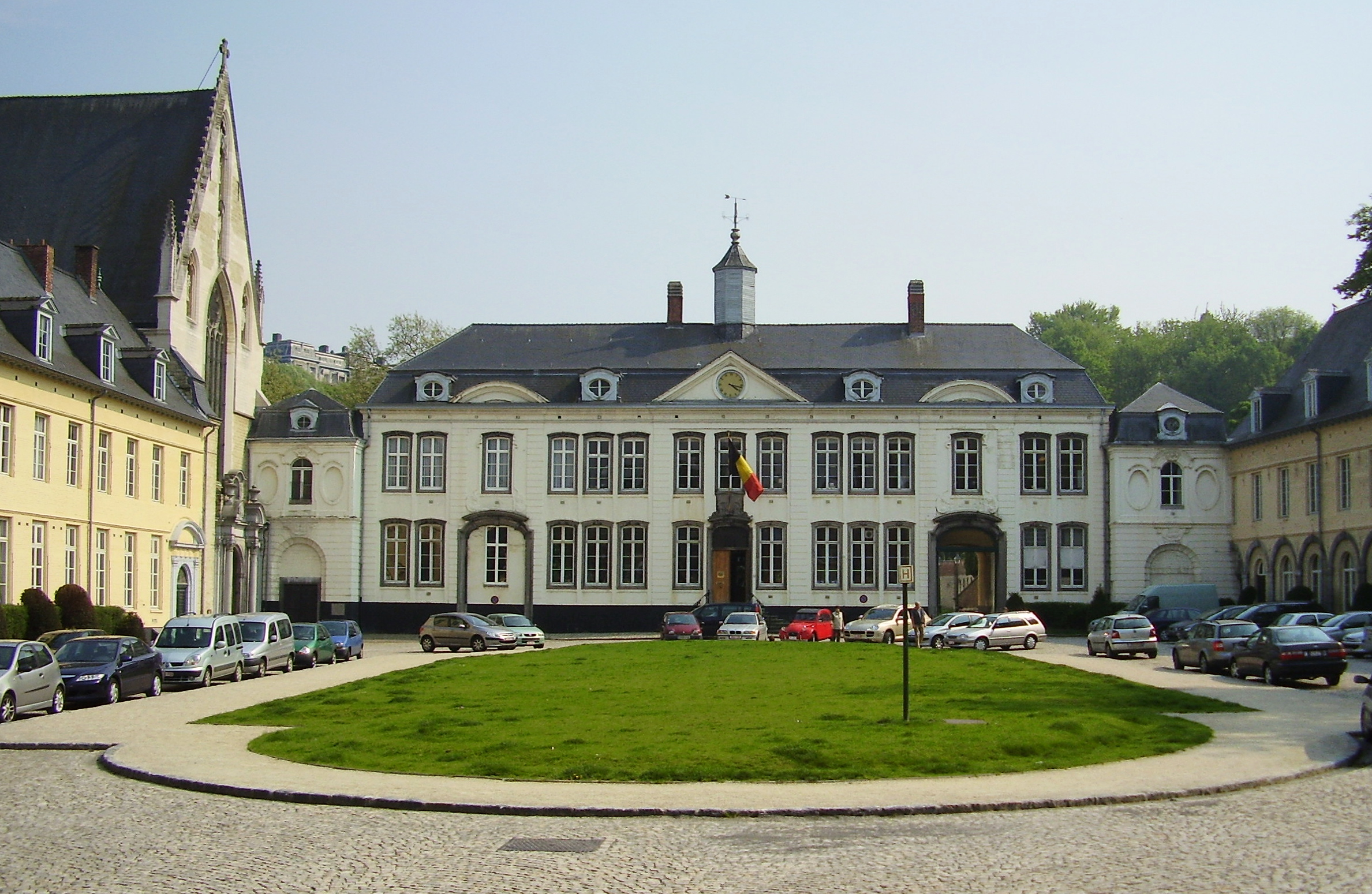
- View from the cour d'honneur (main courtyard)
- Interactive map of the La Cambre Abbey area

General information
- Type: Abbey
- Architectural style: Gothic; Neoclassical
- Location: City of Brussels, Brussels-Capital Region, Belgium
- Coordinates: 50°49′08″N 4°22′27″E
- Construction started: 1201
- Closed: Deconsecrated in 1796

Design and construction
- Designations: Protected (30/06/1953)

Website
- www.premontres-lacambre.be

La Cambre Abbey (French: Abbaye de La Cambre, pronounced [a.be.i d(ə) la kɑ̃bʁ]) or Ter Kameren Abbey (Dutch: Abdij Ter Kameren) is a former Cistercian abbey in the City of Brussels, Belgium. It is located in the Maelbeek valley between the Bois de la Cambre/Ter Kamerenbos and the Ixelles Ponds. The abbey church is a Catholic parish of the Archdiocese of Mechelen–Brussels and home to a community of Norbertine canons, while other parts of the monastery house the headquarters of the Belgian National Geographic Institute (NGI) and La Cambre, a prestigious visual arts school.

The abbey was founded around 1196 and reached its apogee in the 13th century. It was suppressed during the French Revolution and abolished in 1796. Most of today's buildings date from the 18th century; only the church, the refectory and the wing of the capitular hall maintain their medieval character. The simple abbey church houses Albert Bouts' early 16th-century oil painting The Mocking of Christ.

== History ==
=== Early history ===
The abbey was founded around 1196 by its patroness Gisèle, a noble lady from Brussels, with the support of the monastic community of Villers Abbey (in present-day Walloon Brabant), one of the most important Cistercian communities at the time. (Note: The Cistercian order reached its apogee in the early 13th century, not only in Brabant, but also in Flanders and the principality of Liège. During the Middle Ages, some 85 abbeys of Cistercian nuns were founded in the former Netherlands.) Duke Henry I of Brabant donated the Ixelles Ponds, a water mill, and the monastery's domain, which remained under the spiritual guidance of Villers. The abbey was named Camera Beatae Mariae, or Abbaye de la Chambre de Notre-Dame ("Abbey of the Chamber of Our Lady"), probably in reference to the room in Nazareth where the Virgin Mary lived, (Note: In fact, all Cistercian foundations were dedicated to the Mother of God.) which eventually became La Cambre in short form.

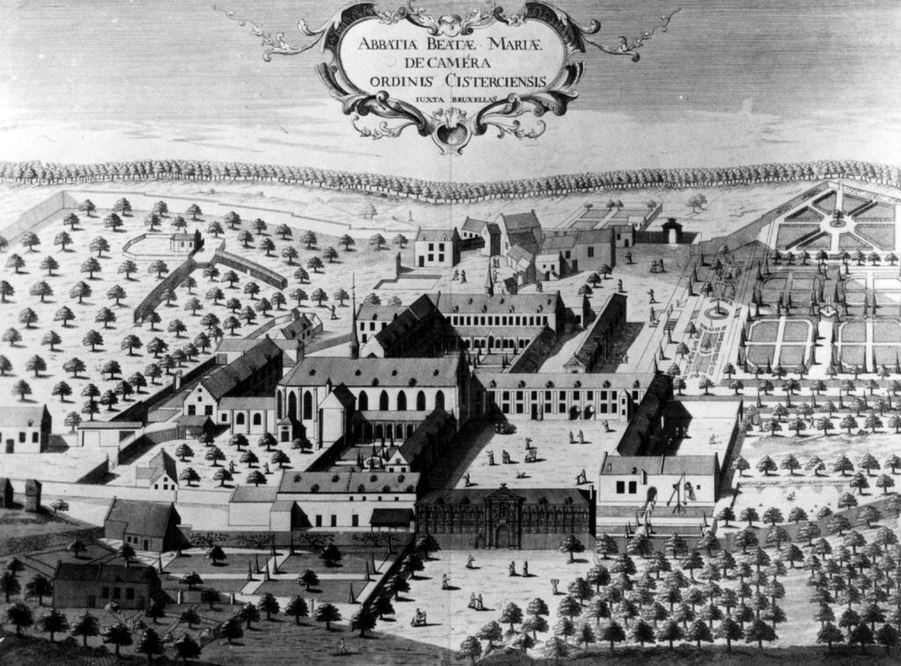
La Cambre Abbey in the early 18th century

The 13th century was a period of great spiritual influence for La Cambre Abbey: Saint Boniface of Brussels (1182–1260), a native of Ixelles, canon of the Collegiate Church of St. Michael and St. Gudula (future cathedral of Brussels), who taught theology at the University of Paris and was made bishop of Lausanne, Switzerland, in 1231, spent the last eighteen years of his life in the abbey and is interred in the church. Saint Alix, a young leper and mystic, also lived in the community from 1232 until her death in 1249. The 14th century was a difficult period for the abbey: located close to the City of Brussels, but outside its walls and therefore unprotected, it often fell victim to looting. In 1381, a fire caused by looters destroyed most of the buildings. In 1400, the abbey church was built, which still exists today. Gothic in style, it nevertheless retains the mark of Cistercian sobriety.

In the 16th century, some important events took place in the abbey. In 1559, Maximilien de Berghes was consecrated bishop of Cambrai. On 28 June 1568, it was also there that the widow of Lamoral, Count of Egmont (with her eleven children) took refuge after the execution of her husband. During the numerous wars of religion of the 16th and 17th centuries, the abbey was once again largely destroyed, namely by Calvinists in 1581 and again during the French invasions around 1672, but it was rebuilt in the 18th century in the French form it largely retains. In the 17th century, a brewery, mill, barn, pig farm and housing for the servants were built, and in the 18th century, the abbot's house.

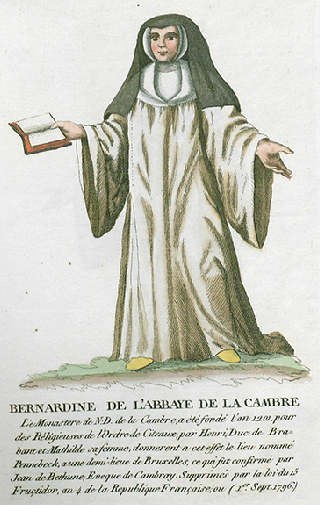
Typical Cistercian nun (or Bernardine) of La Cambre

=== Closure and subsequent usage ===
La Cambre Abbey was suppressed during the French Revolution and the monastery was closed in 1796, but it escaped complete dismantling. The landholding of 550 hectares (1,400 acres) was sold as national property on 7 April 1797. The buyer was Michel Simons, son of the coachbuilder Jean Simons, supplier to the courts and nobility of Europe. After the abbey closed as a monastic community, most of its buildings were demolished; the remaining ones were used successively as a military hospital during the Revolution, a cotton manufacture for five years, and after being purchased by the (then Napoleonic) government in 1810, they became a poor house, where the sick, the infirm, the mentally insane and even delinquents were brought together.

Between 1874 and 1908, the Belgian Royal Military Academy occupied the entire site, installing a gymnasium and a games room in the former abbey church. The former cloister became a refectory and its gallery a courtyard, while the main courtyard became an outdoor riding school and the terraced garden an exercise ground. In 1909, the former abbey church became a parish church, dedicated to Saint Philip Neri. The Belgian National Geographic Institute (NGI), and before it its predecessors the Military Cartographic Institute and the Military Geographic Institute, occupied the premises of the former abbey palace from 1871 to 2020.

During the First World War, the premises were occupied by German troops. After their passage, the site was left in ruins. In 1921, under the impetus of Guillaume Des Marez, archivist for the City of Brussels, and Abbot Maxime-Antoine Carton de Wiart, parish priest of Our Lady of the Cambre and Saint Philip Neri, the League of Friends of La Cambre moved into the former abbey to preserve it. The architects Émar Collès and Guillaume-Chrétien Veraart, with the help of Des Marez, were responsible for the restoration. Starting in 1924, the terraced garden and formal clipped bosquets were restored in the 18th-century manner. In 1927, the architect Henry Van de Velde obtained authorisation to open a Higher Institute of Decorative Arts in the former abbey grounds (today and since 1980 the École nationale supérieure des arts visuels de La Cambre (ENSAV), also simply known as La Cambre, one of the leading visual arts and design schools in Belgium). The former abbey was designated a historic site on 30 June 1953.

In October 2013, the Premonstratensian canons of Leffe Abbey restored religious life at La Cambre Abbey, at the call of the Archdiocese of Mechelen–Brussels: two canons, established as priory, lead the Christian community there and assumed responsibility for the parish. However, on 1 April 2020, in a joint press release, the Abbot of Leffe and the archdiocese announced the priory's closure by the end of summer.

== Architecture and landscape ==
=== Entrances ===
On the Ixelles Ponds' side, La Cambre Abbey has two entrances, which provide access to the church square, the basin where the Maelbeek stream is born, the terraced gardens, the main courtyard, the abbesses' residence, the abbey church, the cloister, the chapter house, the dormitory, the infirmary and a pavilion. The first entrance is a three-arch portico supported by eight pillars. The other entrance is a monumental 18th-century portal, characterised by its attic. The doorway is arched with bands, flanked by two Doric columns and topped by a broken triangular pediment. The pediment features the coat of arms of the 41st and last abbess, Séraphine Snoy, which can also be found in many places on the site.

=== Main courtyard ===
The cour d'honneur (main courtyard), transformed into a car park, is striking for the symmetry and regularity of the neoclassical buildings that surround it, including the presbytery and the common areas. The main courtyard ends to the north with a hemicycle including the entrance door from 1780. While the creation of this courtyard is attributable to the Abbess Louis Delliano y Velasco (1718–1735), it was completed by her successors.

=== Abbey church ===
The Church of Our Lady of the Cambre is located in the south-east corner of the main courtyard. Architecturally, it illustrates the transitional period between the primitive Gothic and the Flamboyant Gothic styles. The north aisle dates from the 15th century, whilst the south aisle has retained its original vault and two early 14th-century windows. It comprises a single nave 54 metres (177 ft) long and 11 metres (36 ft) wide, covered with a shingled vault erected in 1603 and polychromed in 1610. The nave is flanked by a rib-vaulted choir dating from 1657 and lit by five windows, as well as two chapels forming an asymmetrical transept with similar vaulting.

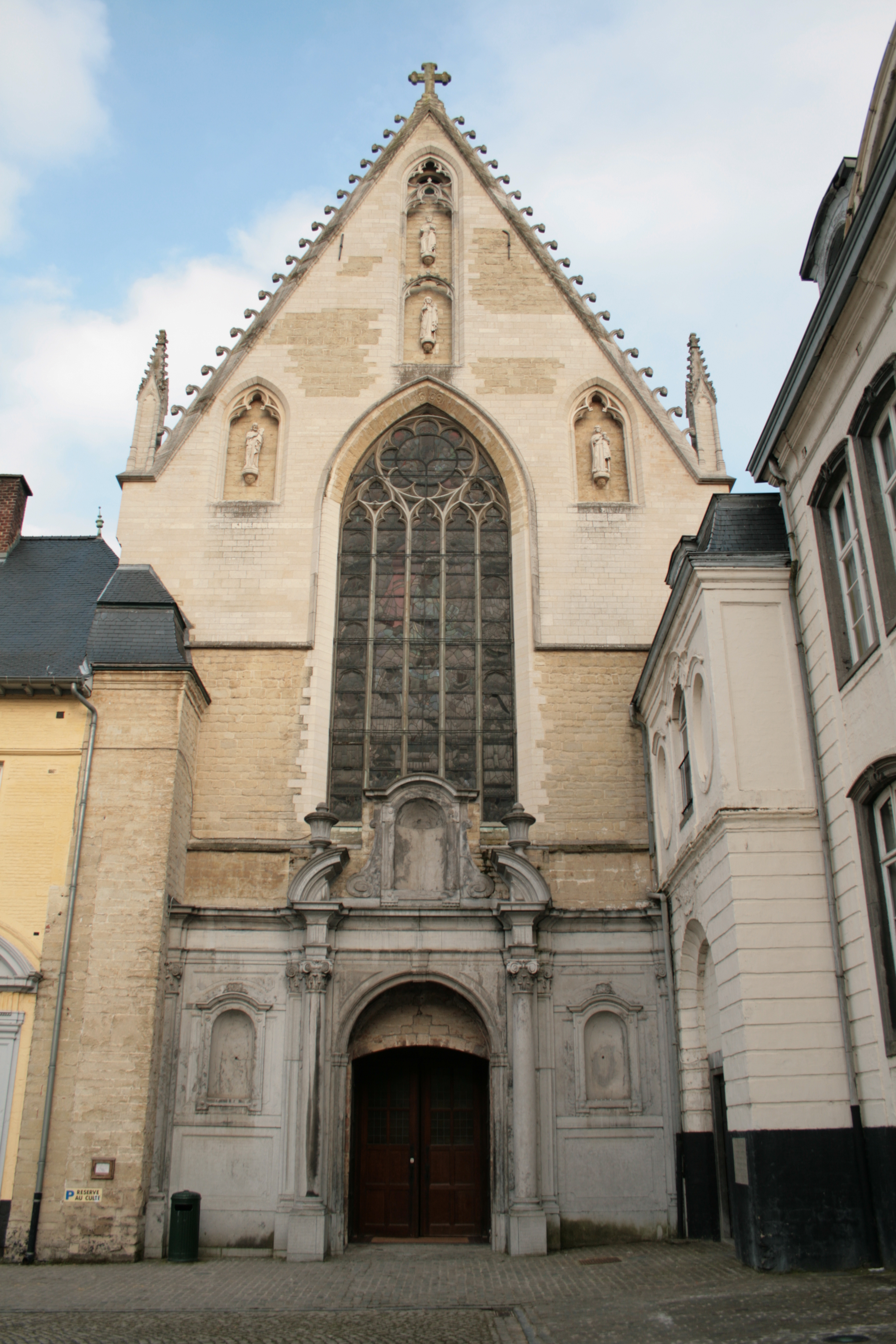
The abbey church's main façade and portal (14th–16th centuries)

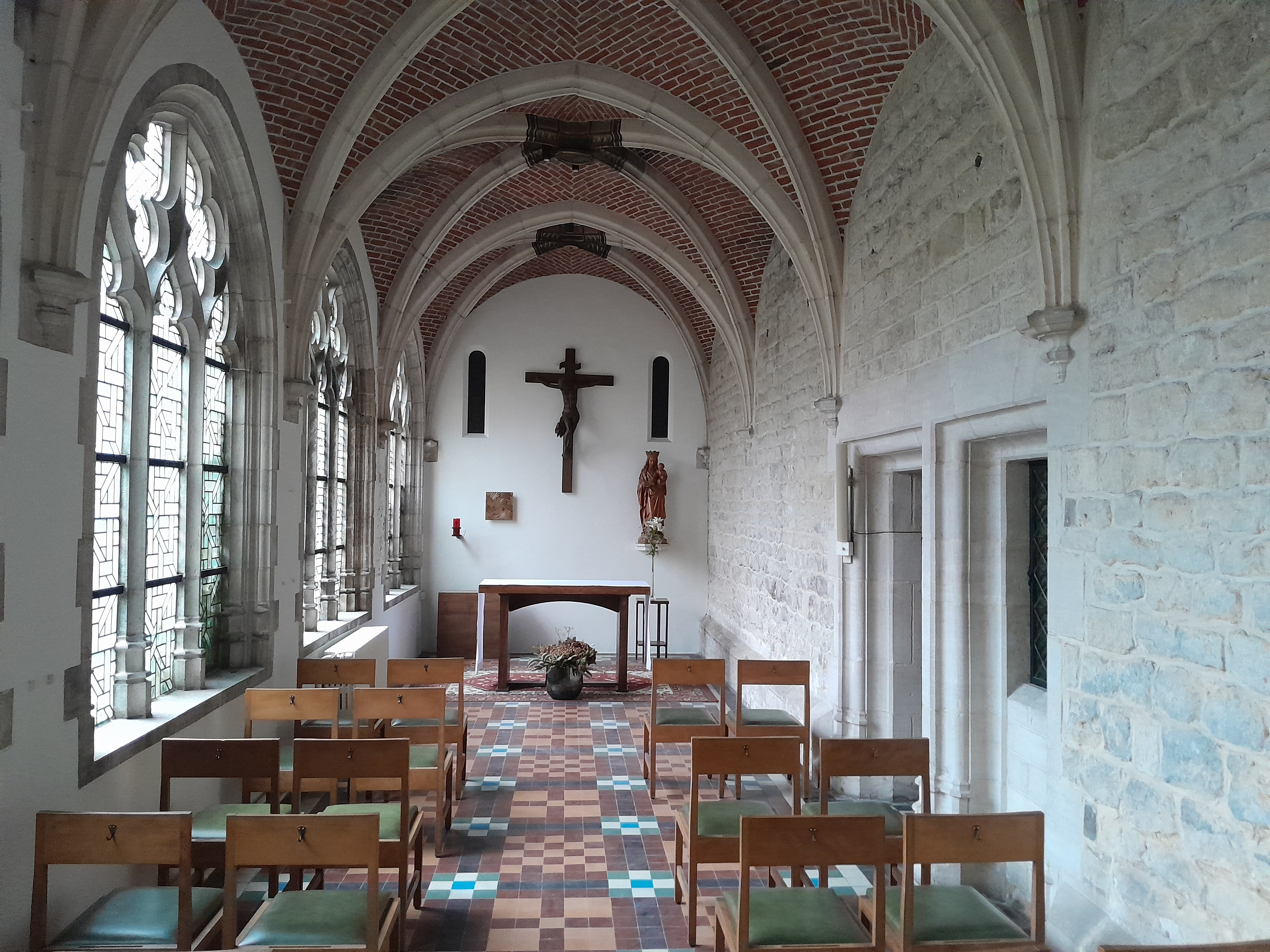
The small, heavily restored 15th-century cloister, converted into a chapel in the mid-20th century

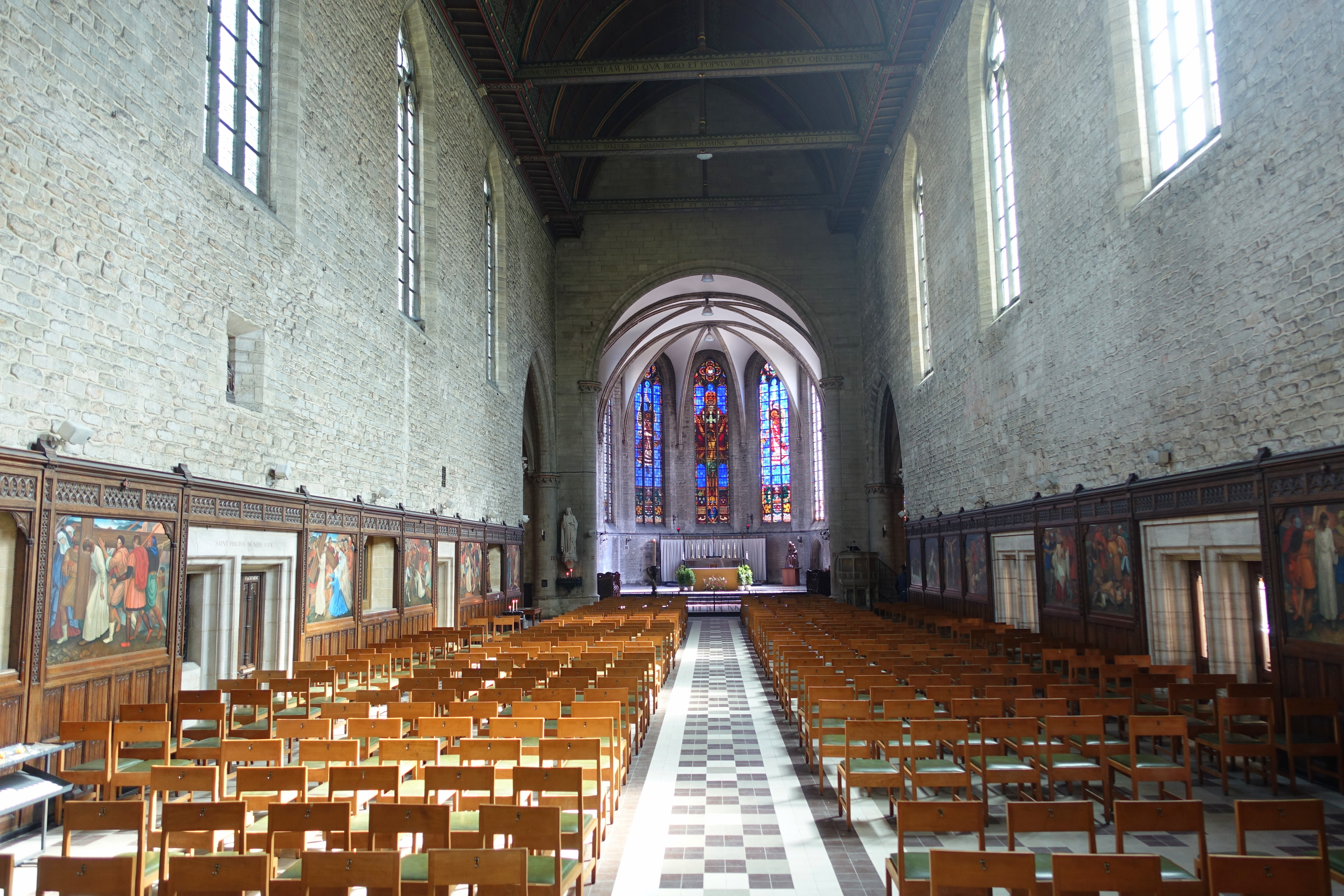
The central nave, and on the right, the actual (main) cloister to the south of the church

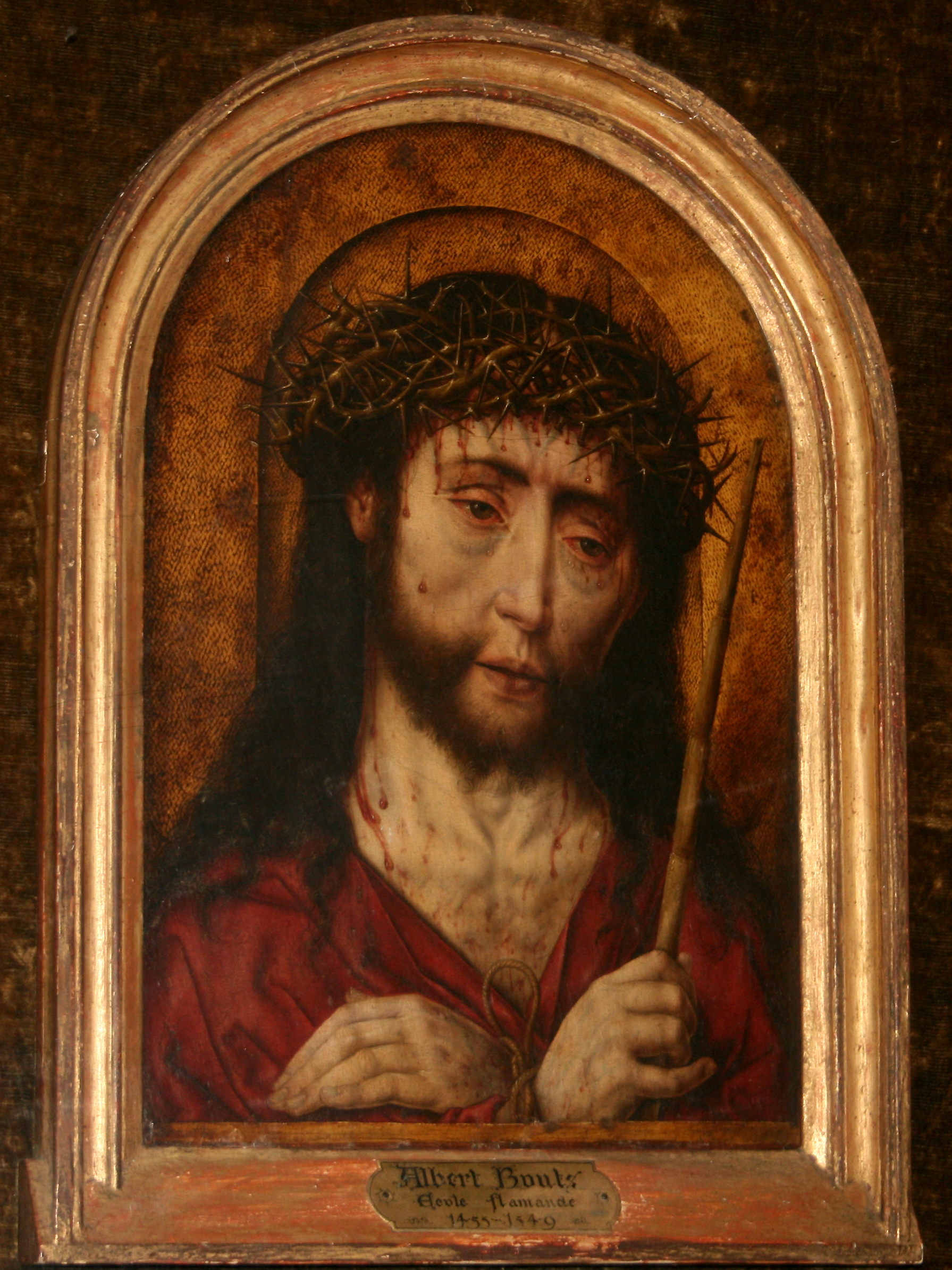
The Mocking of Christ (Bouts, early 16th century)

=== Cloister ===
The cloister is located to the south of the abbey church, as required by Cistercian rule, as well as the refectory, which it adjoins. It was rebuilt in 1599. According to Émile Poumon, it was rebuilt in the second half of the 17th century, and largely rebuilt once more in 1932–1934. The gallery windows feature stained glass with the coats of arms of the abbesses or of some noble nuns.

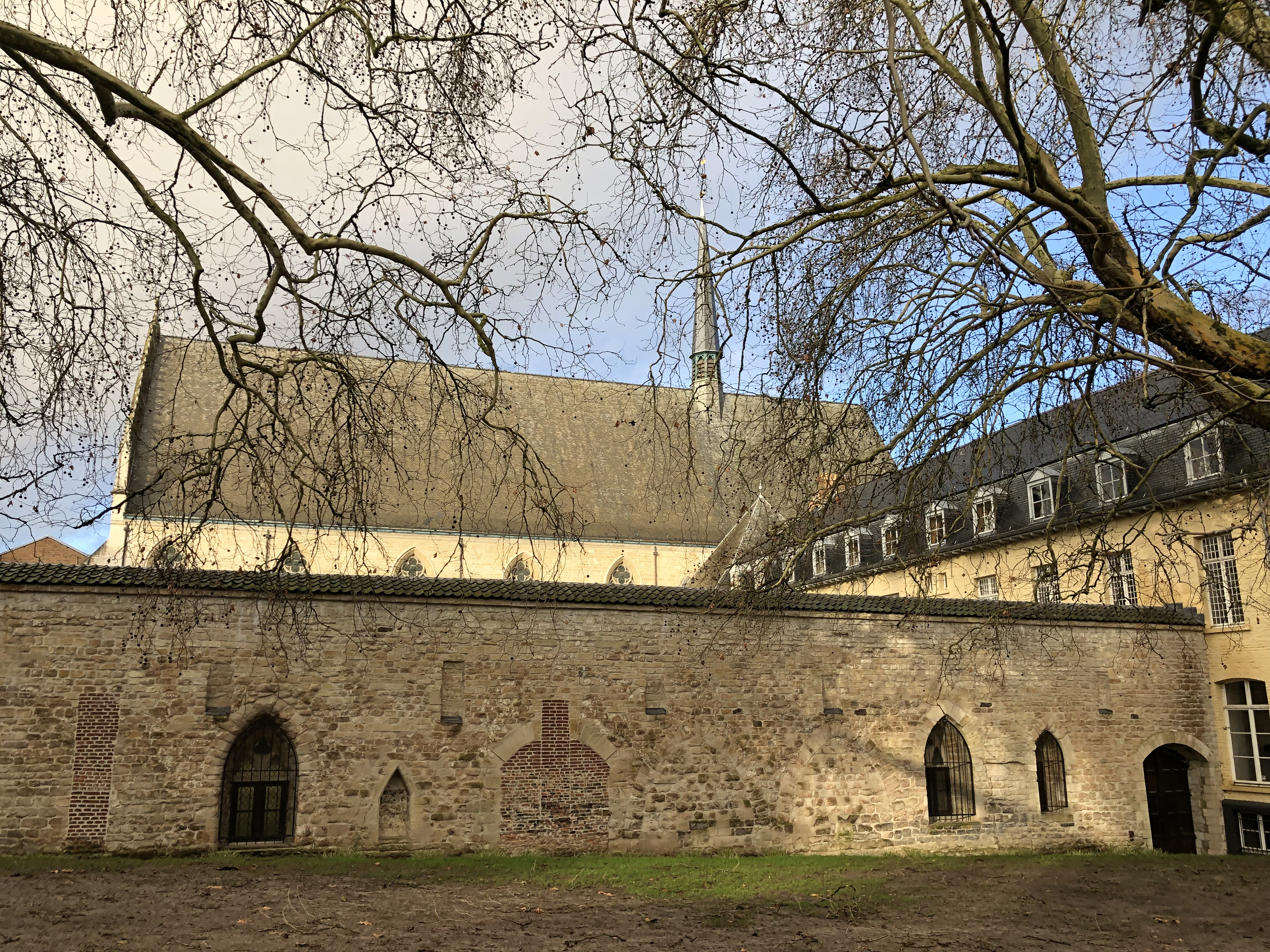
The cloister's south wall still features 13th-century blind windows and arches.

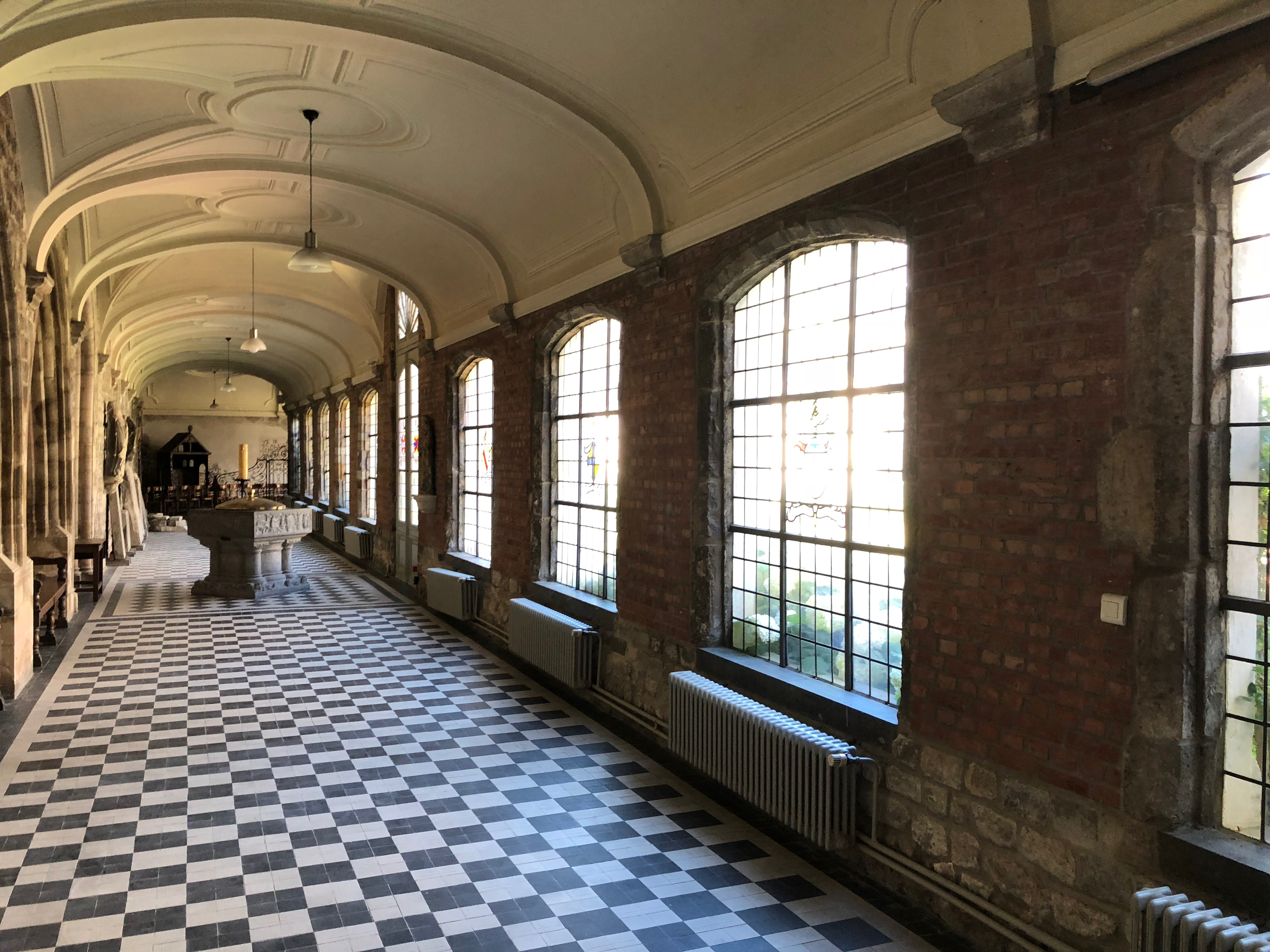
Inside view of the cloister including the baptismal font

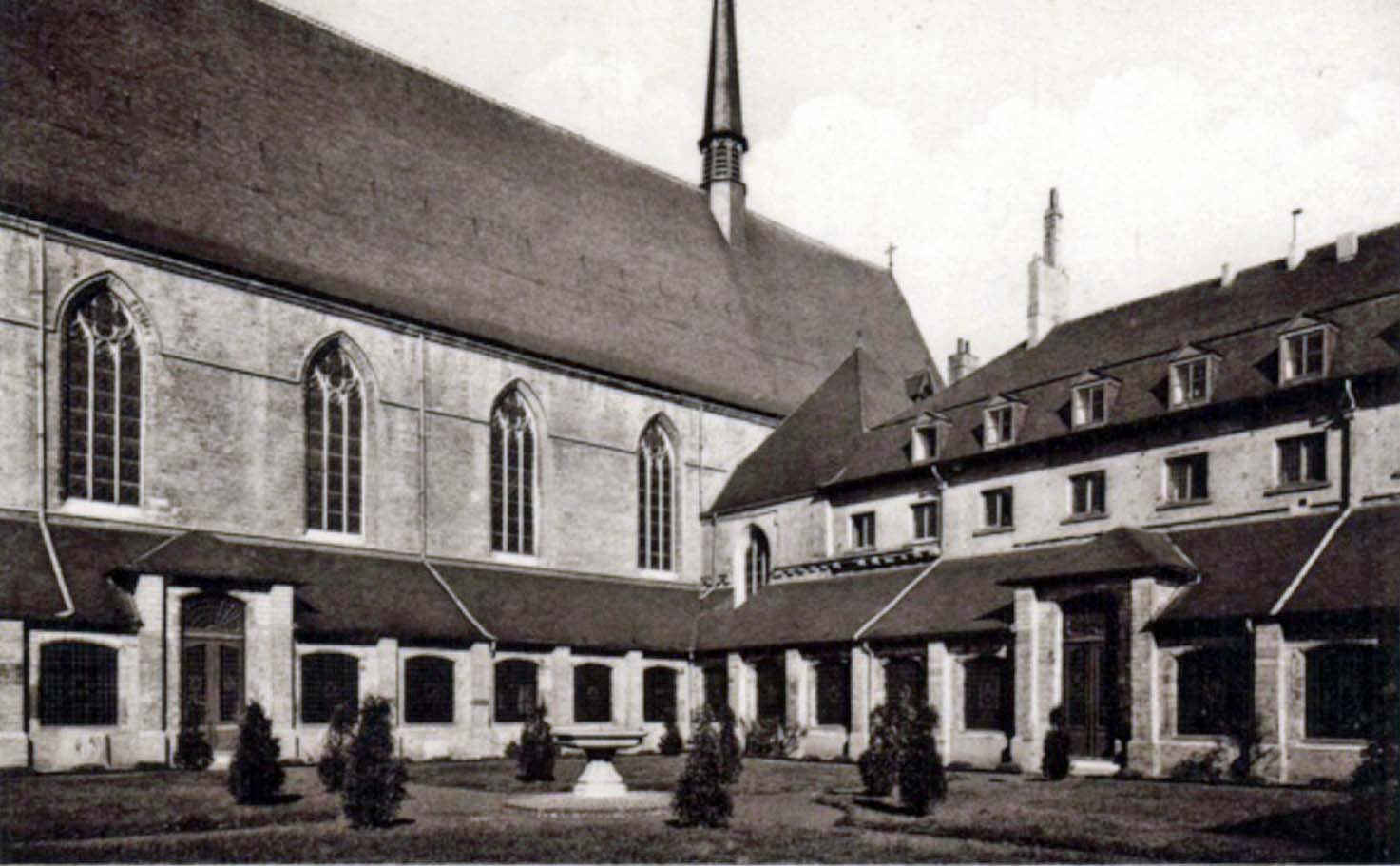
The cloister's garden

=== Abbesses' residence ===
The 18th-century abbesses' residence, in the background, is in the Louis XV style. It is divided into three parts: the central part with a triangular pediment preceded by an eight-step staircase, and the two lateral parts, perpendicular wings with carriage entrance and circular pediment. The roof has four dormer windows. To the right and left, the palace is flanked by a lower, projecting pavilion with a false door on the first floor and two false oval windows on the upper floor. The right pavilion opens onto the rear terraced gardens. On the pavilion's façade, a plaque has been placed in homage to Guillaume Des Marez (1870–1931), one of the leading figures in La Cambre's restoration.

=== Other buildings ===
While the north gallery of the cloister backs onto the church, the east gallery rests on a building that once housed the chapter house, and upstairs, the dormitory. The refectory that supported the south gallery has disappeared. Leaving the church along the dormitory, a second group of 18th-century buildings can be seen further south, including the infirmary (1740 door with coat of arms) and former outbuildings, including the stables. A Louis XV-style pavilion (1760) also stands out.

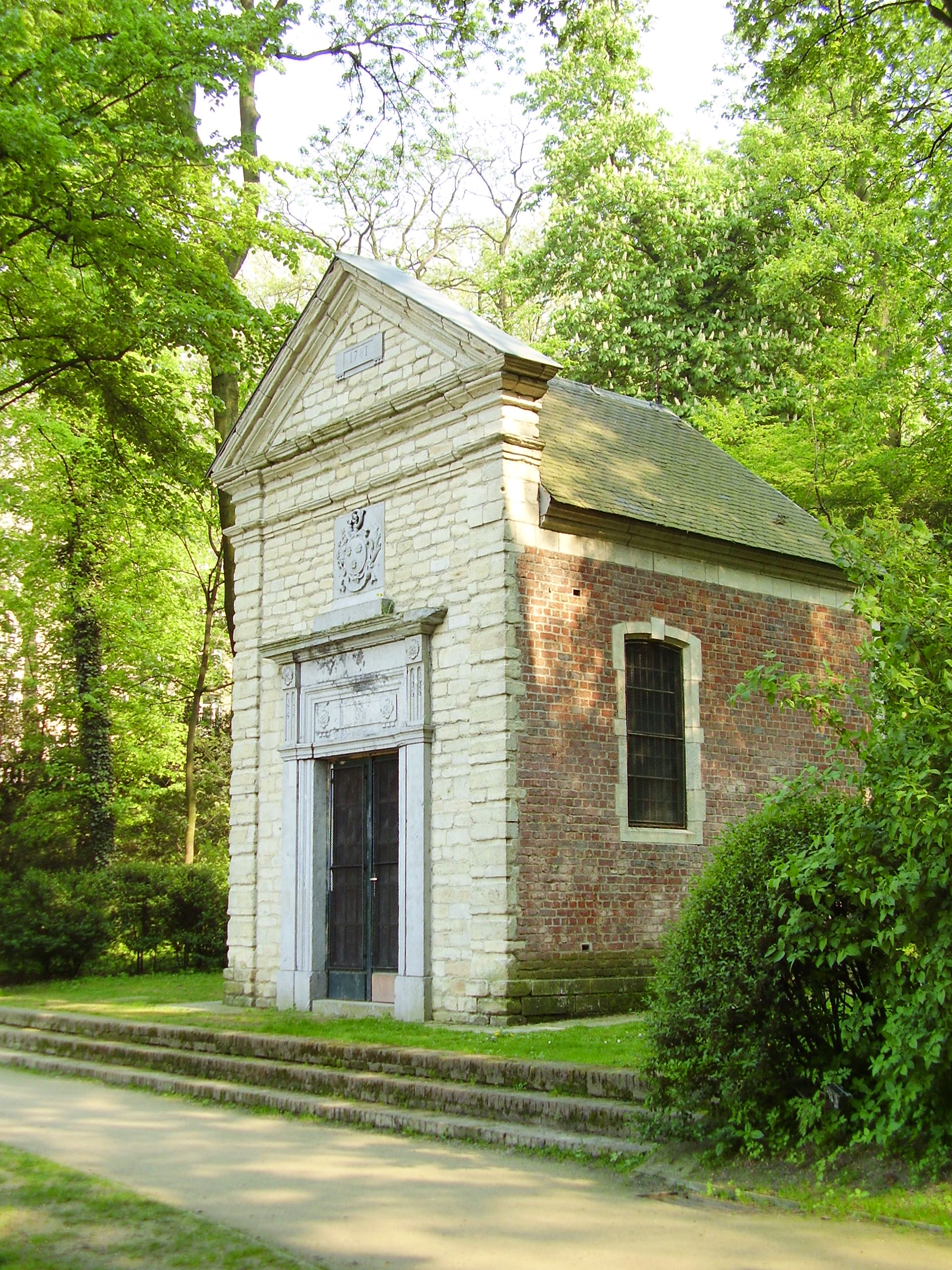
St. Boniface's Chapel

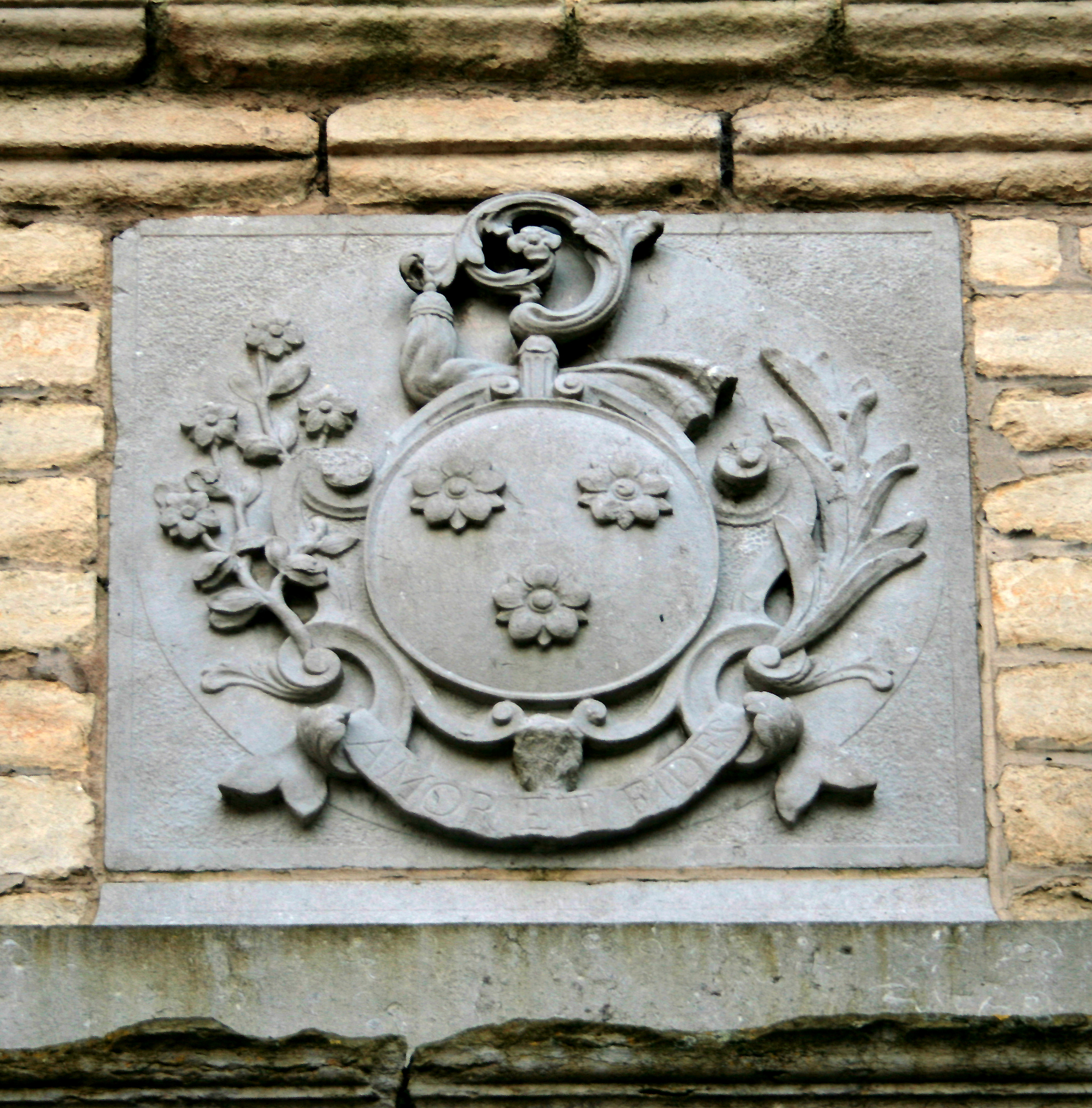
Closeup of the coat of arms of Abbess Séraphine Snoy

=== Gardens ===
The French formal gardens were created around 1725 by the Abbess Delliano y Velasco, whose coat of arms appears on the wall of the access staircase. They consist of five successive terraces. They were restored to their original state in 1924. The monumental staircase features two enormous bossed pillars, flanked by volutes and topped by vases. These gardens have been classified as protected heritage by the Brussels-Capital Region since 30 March 1989.

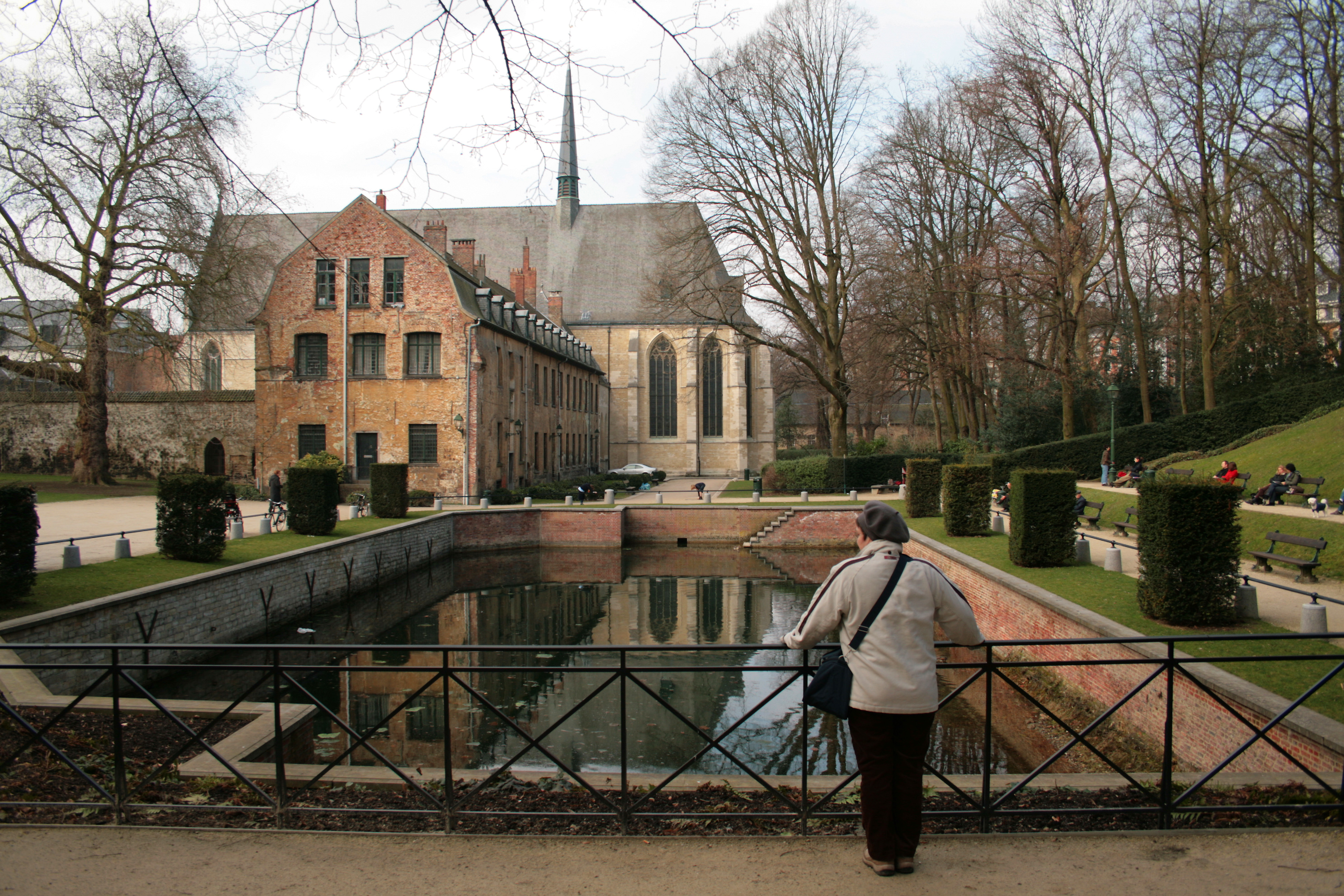
In the garden, there is a basin with one of the sources of the Maelbeek

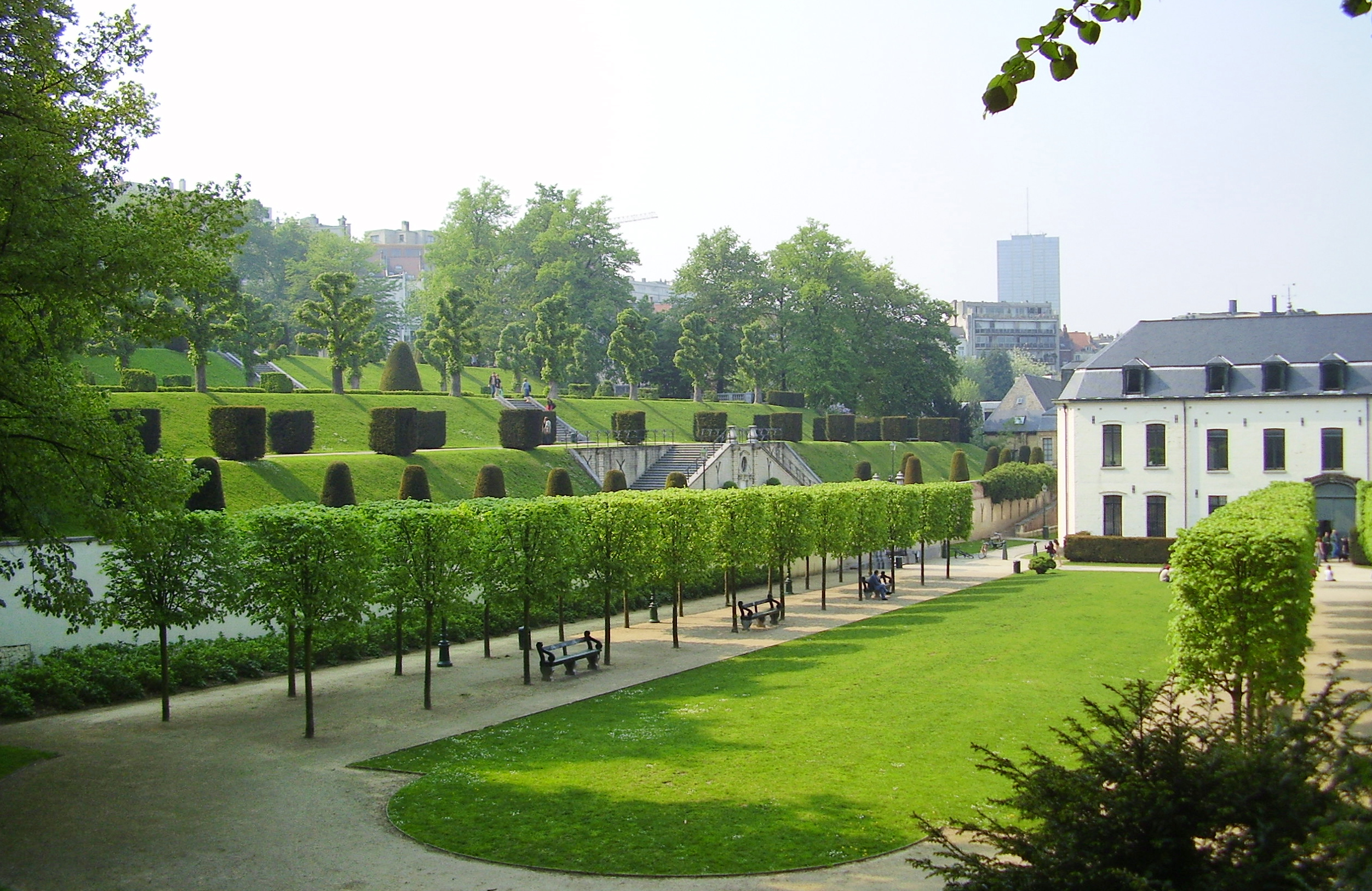
Clipped trees in a formal bosquet form the Promenade des abbesses

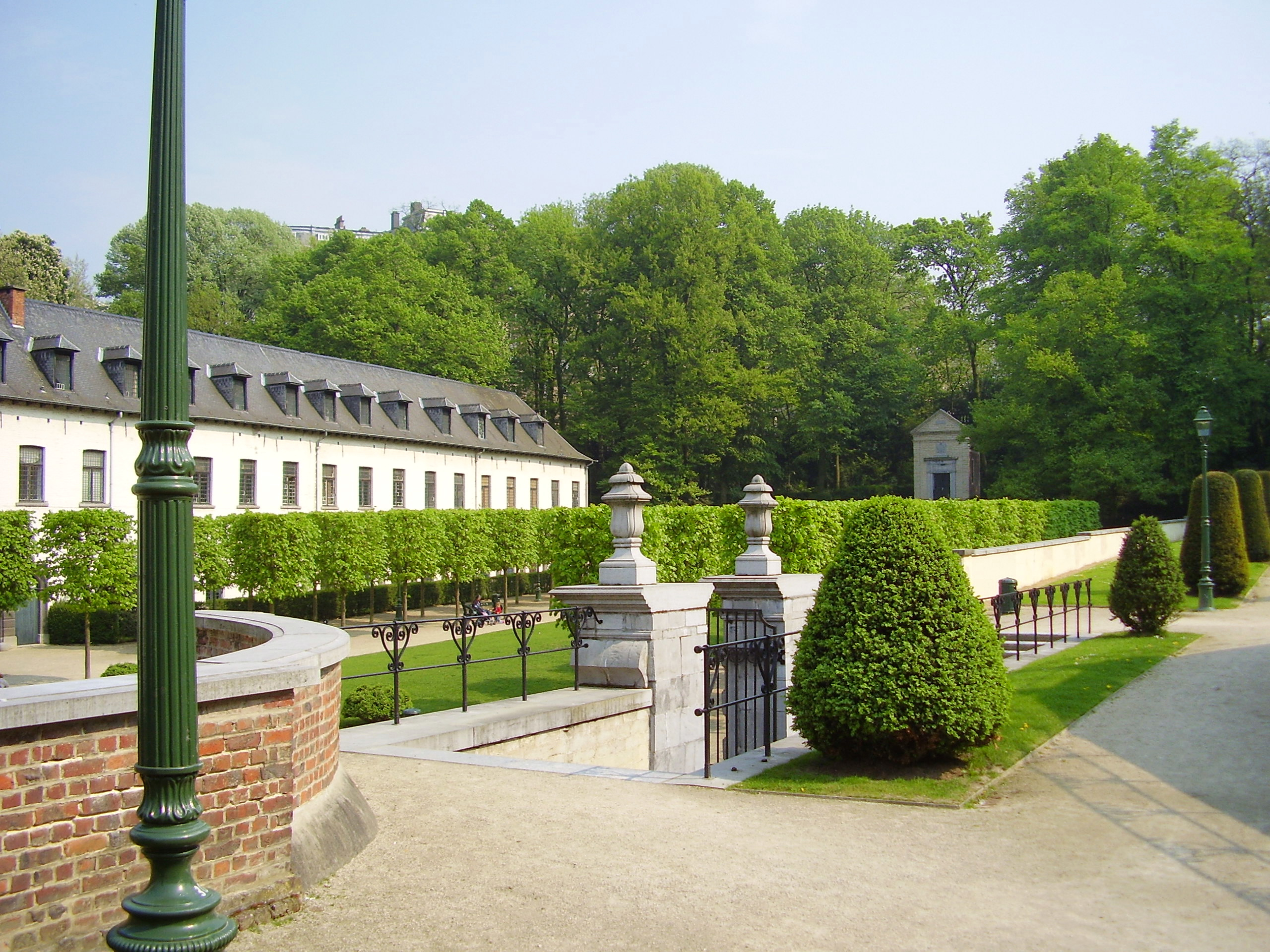
View of the gardens

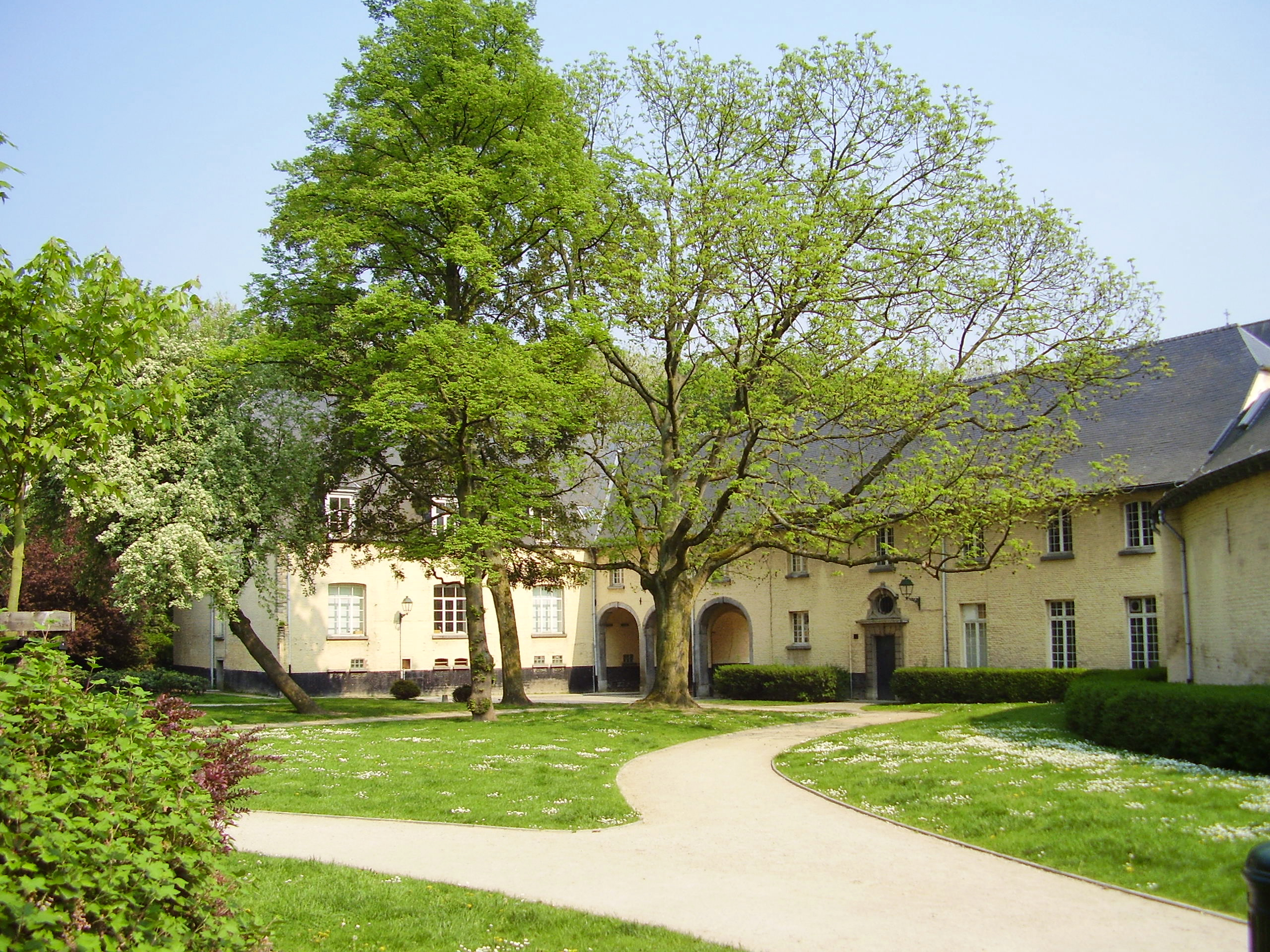
Another view of the gardens

== Residents ==
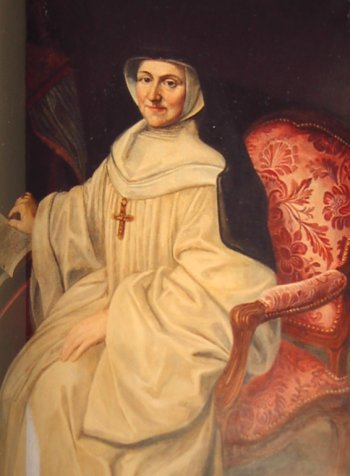
Marie-Alexandrine Snoy

=== Commendatory Abbesses ===
- Régine, Lady of Beauffort
- Marie, Lady of Egmont
- Catherine de t'Serclaes
- Catherine Taye
- Marie, Countess vander Noot
- 1627–1709: Isabelle Claire Eugénie Schetz, elected on 6 March 1683, daughter of Anthonie II Schetz, Count of Grobbendonk
- 1757–1794: Marie Alexandrine Snoy, last abbess, named Dame Séraphine

=== Bernardine Nuns ===
Most of the residing nuns were daughters of important Noble Houses and the abbesses were usually members of wealthy families. The sisters were named Bernardines of La Cambre.

- Saint Alice of Schaerbeek (1204–1250)
- Constantia Rubens, daughter of Peter Paul Rubens
- Catherine d'Ittre

== See also ==
- Roman Catholicism in Belgium
- Neoclassical architecture in Belgium
- History of Brussels
- Culture of Belgium
- Belgium in the long nineteenth century
