= Maalbeek =

Stream in Brussels, Belgium

Maelbeek (French); Maalbeek (Dutch)
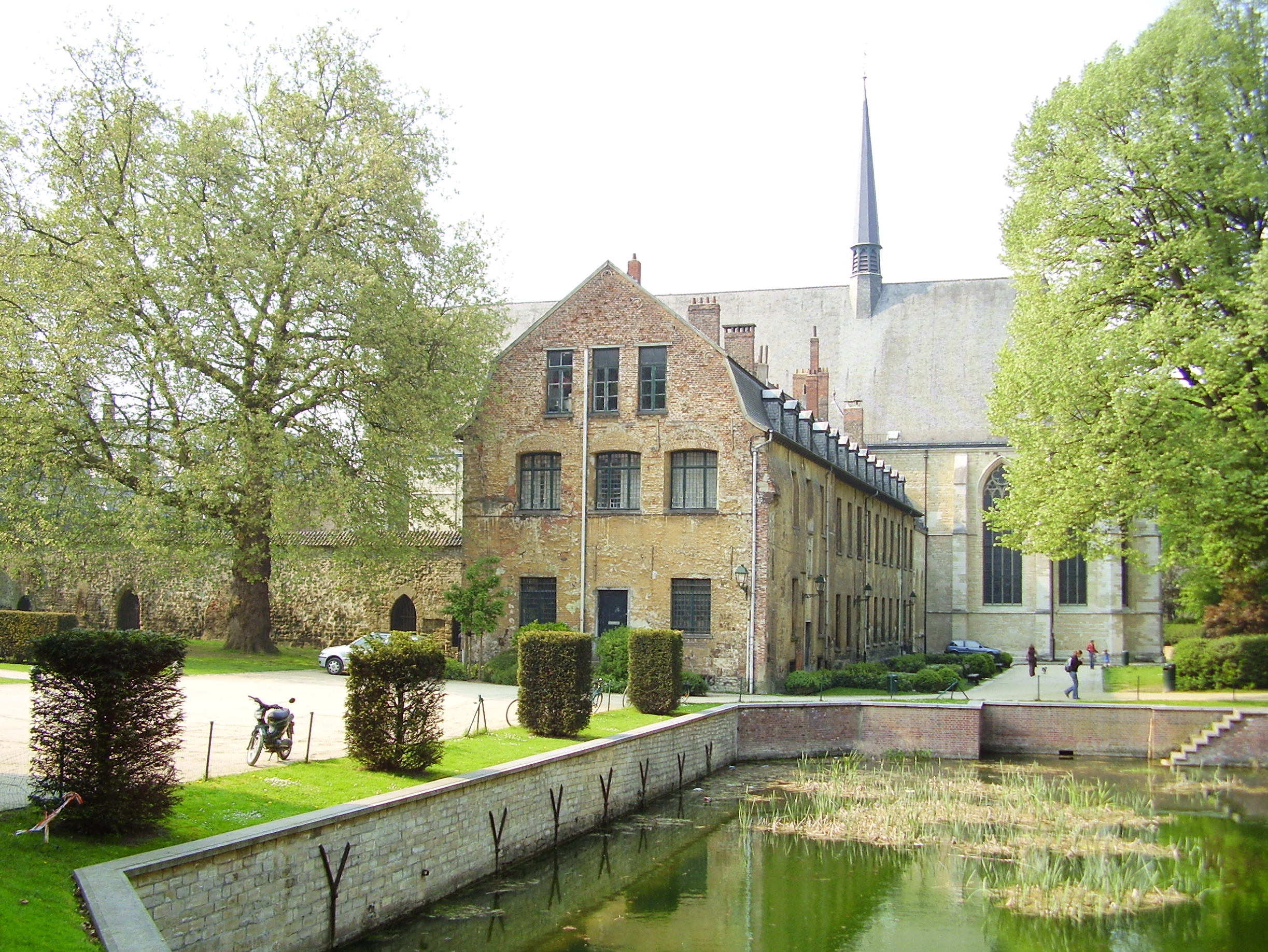
- The source of the Maelbeek at La Cambre Abbey in Brussels

Location
- Country: Belgium

Physical characteristics
- Mouth: Senne
  - coordinates: 50.838°N 4.3796°E

Basin features
- Progression: Senne→ Dyle→ Rupel→ Scheldt→ North Sea

The Maelbeek (French, pronounced [malbek, -bɛk]; former Dutch spelling) or Maalbeek (modern Dutch, pronounced [ˈmaːlbeːk]) is a stream that flows through several municipalities in Brussels, Belgium, including Etterbeek, Ixelles, Saint-Josse-ten-Noode, Schaerbeek. It is a tributary of the Senne, which it joins up in Schaerbeek, from its source located to the south near La Cambre Abbey. Maelbeek/Maalbeek metro station is located in the central area of this Maalbeek valley.

The name Maalbeek, meaning "mill brook", comes from the Dutch words beek (meaning "brook") and maal (meaning "to mill"). Molenbeek has a similar derivation. The stream was vaulted in 1872, at which time there were 58 ponds along it. Nowadays, only six are left: the ponds of La Cambre Abbey; of Ixelles (two); of Leopold Park; of Marie-Louise Square; and of Josaphat Park.

There is another stream in the vicinity named Maalbeek, also a tributary to the Senne, in Grimbergen, and two other streams named Molenbeek, found in Beersel and in Laeken. The Woluwe river also has a tributary named the Kleine (little) Maalbeek, in Kraainem.

== See also ==
- Maelbeek Valley Garden
- List of rivers of Belgium
