= Alice of Schaerbeek =

Cistercian lay sister and saint

Saint Alice of Schaerbeek O.Cist
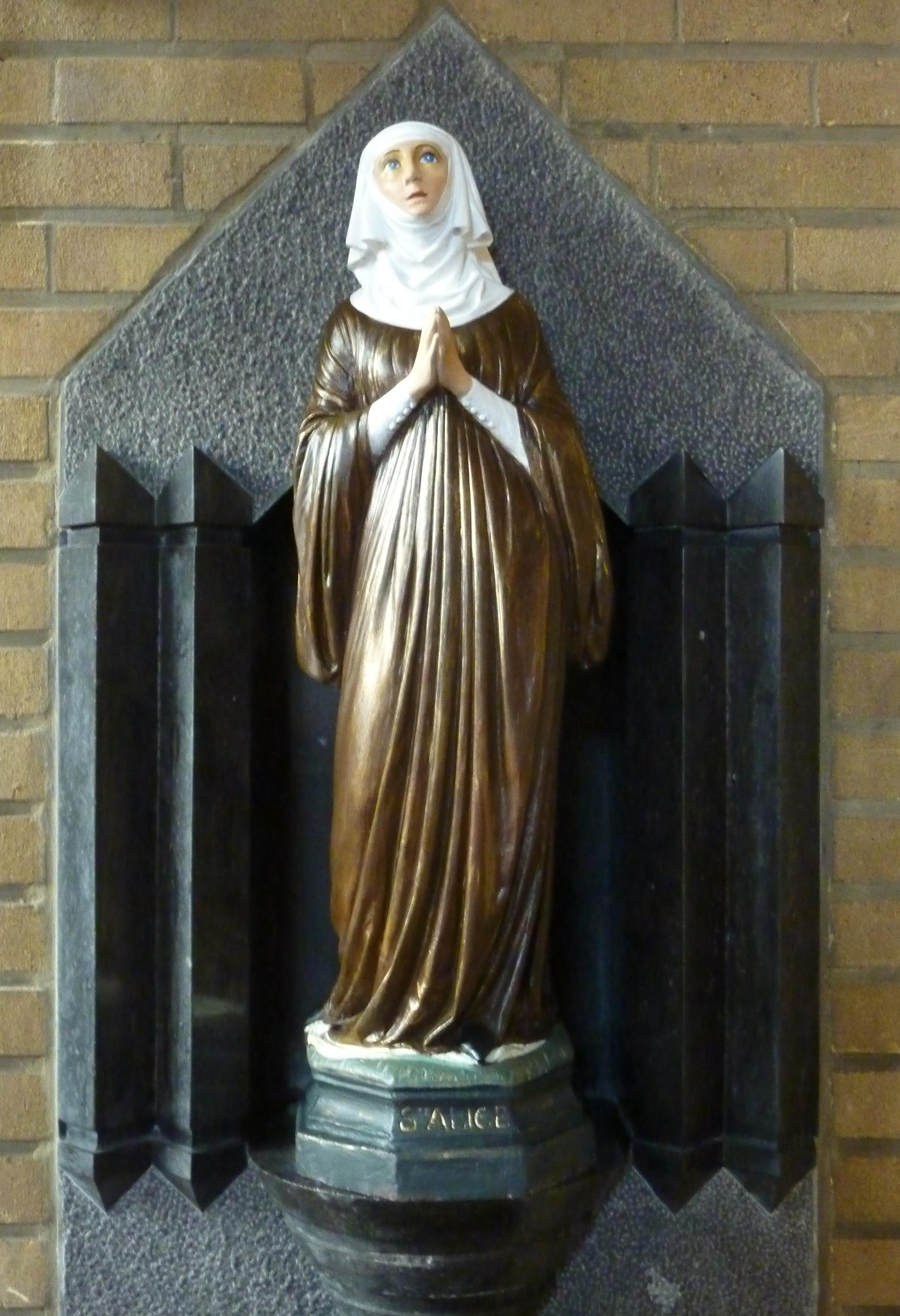

Virgin and lay sister
- Born: c. 1220; Schaerbeek, Duchy of Brabant, Holy Roman Empire
- Died: 11 June 1250; La Cambre Abbey, Ixelles, Duchy of Brabant, Holy Roman Empire
- Venerated in: Catholic Church
- Canonized: Cultus confirmed 1907
- Feast: 15 June
- Patronage: The Blind, the Paralyzed

Alice of Schaerbeek (or Adelaide or Aleydis) (also known as Alice the Leper) (Dutch: Sint Aleydis, French: Sainte Alix), (c. 1220–1250) was a Cistercian lay sister who is venerated as the patron saint of the blind and paralyzed. Her feast day is 15 June.

== Life ==
Alice was born at Schaerbeek, near Brussels, then in the Duchy of Brabant. A frail child, she was sent at the age of seven to be boarded and educated at the Cistercian La Cambre Abbey, where she remained for the rest of her life. The name of the abbey is derived from the Latin: Camera Sanctae Mariae (Chamber of Our Lady) and is recalled in the park southeast of Brussels called "Ter Kamerenbos / Bois de la Cambre" ("Chamber Woods").

Alice was a very pretty girl and a lovable child, and soon showed great intelligence and a deep love for God. She became a laysister at the abbey. However, at some 20 years of age (c. 1240), she contracted leprosy and had to be isolated in a small hut. The disease caused her intense suffering, which she offered for the salvation of sinners and the souls in purgatory.

Eventually, she became paralyzed and afflicted with blindness. Her greatest consolation came from the reception of the Holy Eucharist, although she was not allowed to drink from the chalice because of the presumed danger of contamination. However, it is said that the Lord appeared to her with assurance that He was in both the consecrated bread and the wine. She died in 1250, at the age of c. 30.

The little we know about Alice's life comes from a Latin biography, composed c. 1260–1275. Authorship of the work is unknown. Scholars have typically believed that the author was an anonymous chaplain at La Cambre Abbey. However, Martinus Cawley suggests that Arnulf II of Ghistelles, abbot of Villers Abbey 1270–1276, is its likely author. Alice's biography was also translated into Middle Dutch, as witnessed by one extant manuscript.

By decree of 1 July 1702, Pope Clement XI granted to the monks of the Congregation of St. Bernard Fuliensi the faculty to celebrate the cultus of Alice. Devotion to Alice as a saint was approved in 1907 by Pope Pius X.

== Influence ==
Alice's biography has been upheld as a model of Cistercian spirituality. Writing in 1954, Trappist monk Thomas Merton, for example, called the text "a practical and concise treatise of Cistercian asceticism." Nevertheless, Alice of Schaerbeek was not particularly well known. Chrysogone Waddell, reflecting on his entry into the Cistercian life in the 1950s, remarked on her obscurity, noting that Alice was mostly unknown even in devout Cistercian communities of the time.

In recent years, Alice has become more well known in medieval scholarship as a member of the so-called "Holy Women of Liège" corpus of thirteenth-century Latin biographies. This situates Alice, and her spirituality, in terms of the beguine movement, an innovation in medieval women's piety that saw women taking up an active religious life outside of monastic enclosure.

== Primary sources: Manuscripts ==
Margot H. King and Ludo Jongen detail 5 extant manuscripts of Alice's biography (4 in Latin; 1 in Middle Dutch) These are:

- Brussels, Bibliothèque Royale 4459–70 (3161), ff. 48–57: “Vita sanctimonialis Aleidis de Scarenbeke.” (Cistercian: Villers-la-Ville; Augustinian: Louvain; Val Saint Martin; 14th century; Latin). Also contains a biography of Christina the Astonishing.
- Brussels, Bibliothèque Royale 8609–20 (3206), ff. 139–146: "Vita sanctimonialis Aleidis de Scharenbeka". (Cistercian: Cambre St. Marie; after 1250; Latin). Also includes biographies of Christina the Astonishing and Ida of Nivelles.
- Brussels, Bibliothèque Royale IV. 778, 11 ff.: Vita sanctae Aleydis. (ca. 1500. La Cambre; c. 1500; Latin).
- Vienna, Österreichische Nationalbibliothek 12706–12707, ff. 248–252v: "Vita sanctimonialis Aleidis de Scarenbeke". (Rouge Cloître. Gielemans; 15th century; Latin). Also includes biographies of Marie of Oignies, Ida of Louvain, Ida of Nivelles, Ida of Léau, and Lutgard of Aywières. This manuscript has been digitized and is available to view online.
- 's-Gravenhage, Koninklijke Bibliotheek 71 H 7, ff. 1–8v: "Sinte Aleijdes van Scarembeke leuen". (Brabant; 15th century; Middle Dutch).

== Primary sources: Critical editions ==
- Latin Critical edition: "De B. Aleyde Scharembekana, Sanctimoniali Ordinis Cisterciensis, Camerae Iuxta Bruxellam", in Acta Sanctorum, edited by Godfrey Henschen, 477–83. Paris: Société des Bollandistes, 1688; repr. 1969.
- Modern English translation: Life of St Alice of Schaerbeek. Translated by Martinus Cawley, O.C.S.O. Lafayette, OR: Our Lady of Gaudalupe Abbey, 2000. Excerpts of the translation are available to read online.

== See also ==
- List of Catholic saints
- La Cambre Abbey
- Villers Abbey
- Beguines and Beghards
- Marie of Oignies
- Christina the Astonishing
- Lutgard of Aywières
- Leprosy in the Middle Ages
